= Historiography in the Middle Ages =

Main historiographical aspects in the Middle Ages

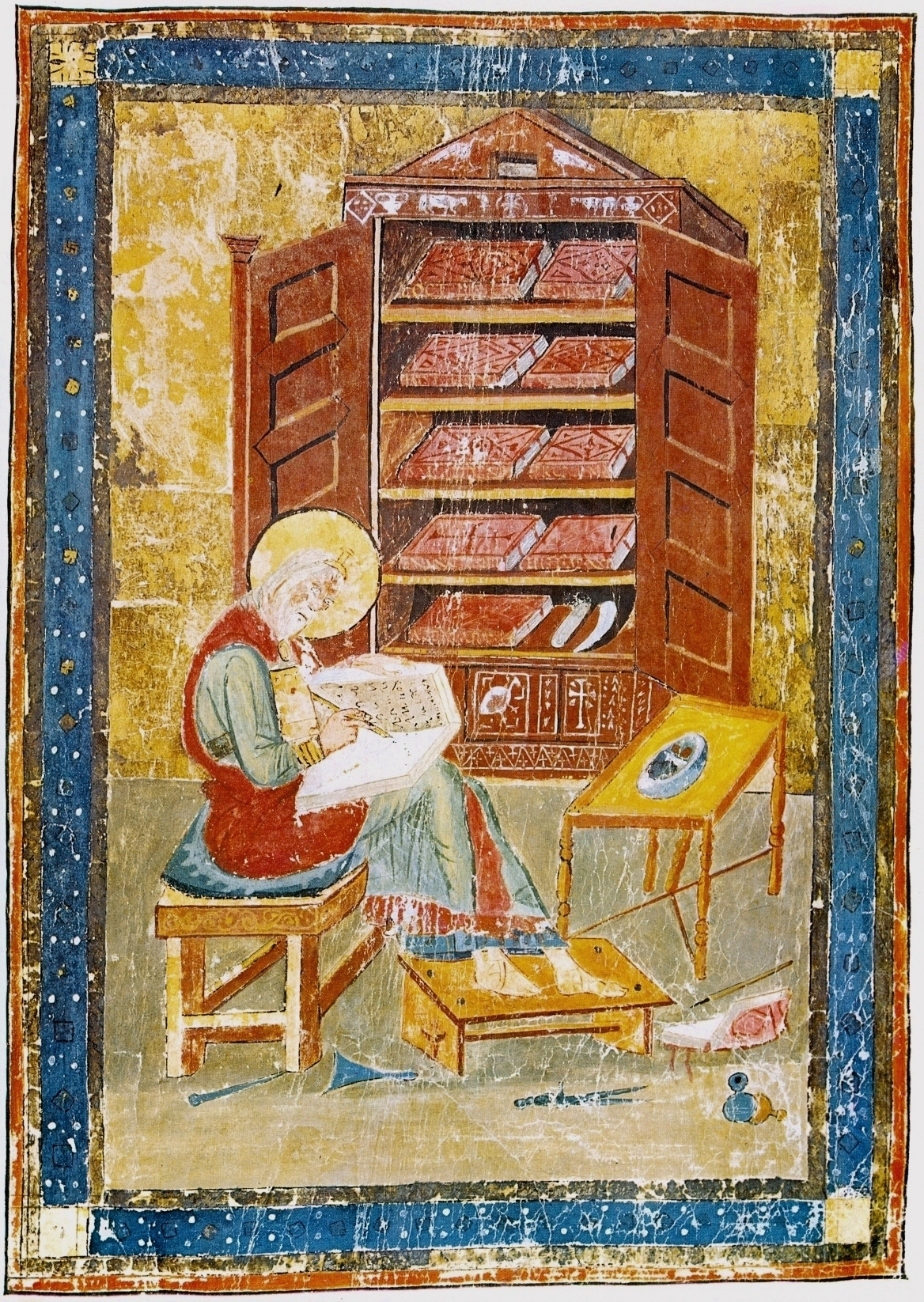
Miniature on l. 5 verso of the Codex Amiatinus, which opens the Old Testament. It shows Ezra as a monastic scribe. Florence, Laurentian Library

Historiography in the Middle Ages (in Russian: Средневековая историография, in German: Mittelalterliche Geschichtsschreibung, in French: Historiographie médiévale) refers to the deliberate preservation of the memory of the past in the historical writings of Western European authors from the 4th to the 15th centuries. As a continuation of Ancient historiography, it diverged by organizing events in strict chronological order rather than by cause-and-effect relationships and tended to be poorly localized geographically. History was not recognized as an independent discipline during the Middle Ages, and there was no professional historian. Nonetheless, authors understood the distinctiveness of the historical genre. Historical writing was primarily the work of the clergy, though it was also undertaken by statesmen, troubadours, minstrels, and members of the bourgeoisie. Most texts were composed in Latin, with vernacular works appearing only from the High Middle Ages onward.

While retaining the rhetorical methods inherited from antiquity, medieval historiography was deeply shaped by Christian concepts, primarily universalism and eschatology. Almost all medieval historians adopted a universalist worldview, seeing history as the unfolding of God's will. As R. Collingwood noted, “history, as the will of God, predetermines itself... even those who think they oppose it actually contribute to its fulfillment.

Medieval historians typically presented past and contemporary events in chronological order, a method that led to the notion of historical development through stages. One early scheme, by Hippolytus of Rome and Julius Africanus, fused the classical idea of the four ages (Golden, Silver, Bronze, Iron) with Christian providentialism, linking each era with a major empire: Chaldean, Persian, Macedonian, and Roman. A later influential model was proposed by Joachim of Fiore in the 12th century, who divided history into three epochs: the Age of the Father (pre-Christian), the Age of the Son (Christian era), and the anticipated Age of the Holy Spirit. Revelation served as the interpretive key to understanding divine acts in history. However, while it revealed God’s plans for the future, the historian's task remained confined to interpreting the past.

== Subject and terminology ==
=== Definition of the "Middle Ages" and its limits ===
French historian Bernard Guenée (1980) famously observed:

Every medievalist today knows that the Middle Ages never existed, and even more so, that the spirit of the Middle Ages never existed. Who would think of lumping together the people and institutions of the seventh, eleventh, and fourteenth centuries? When it comes to periodization, the year 1000 or 1300 has no more or less right than the end of the fifth or the end of the fifteenth century. The truth is that in the complex fabric that is history, the changes that occur in each field and at different levels of each field do not coincide, do not coincide. The more general the periodization, the more controversial it turns.

Despite these challenges, Guenée acknowledged certain unifying features of the era in the Latin West (i.e., Italy, Spain, and lands north of the Alps and Pyrenees), where Latin was the dominant cultural language and the Roman Church held institutional primacy. These elements differentiate the Western Middle Ages from the continuity seen in the Greek-speaking East. The division of history into Antiquity, Middle Ages (medium aevum), and Renaissance originated with Italian humanists. Though the term "Middle Ages" became widely accepted over time, it was rooted in a polemical rejection of the ancient Roman past. As such, it does not easily apply to regions outside the Roman sphere, such as Ireland, where some scholars consider the medieval period to begin with the Anglo-Norman conquest in 1169, or Scandinavia. Applying the term to non-Western civilizations (e.g., Islamic, Chinese, or Japanese histories) is even more contentious. The Routledge Encyclopedic Guide to Historiography (1997) restricts the term to the European context, particularly to areas influenced by the Germanic migrations into the former Roman Empire. It notably excludes the Balkans and Slavic Central Europe, reflecting a historiographical tradition shaped over five centuries. The chronological framework most commonly used—roughly from the 4th to the 15th century—has roots in the Dictionary of the French Academy (1798), which defined the Middle Ages as the period from the reign of Constantine to the literary revival of the 15th century. Similar timeframes have since been adopted in modern Russian and other European historiographies.

=== Medieval historicism and rhetoric ===
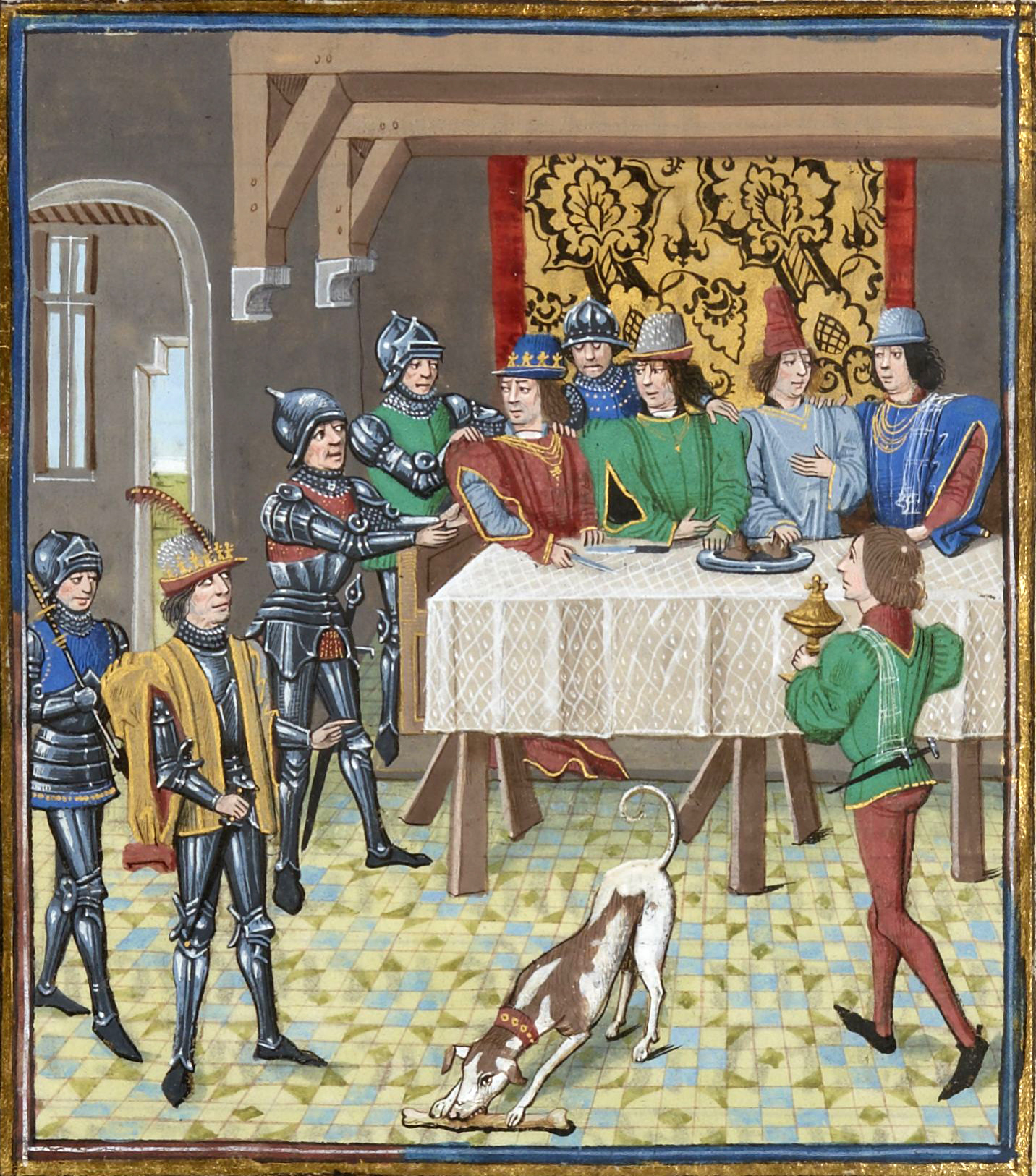
John II of France orders the arrest of Charles II of Navarre. Miniature from the manuscript of the Chronicles of Froissart. XIV century

Medieval historiography, shaped by Christian and Jewish traditions, was inherently historical in character. As noted by D. Deliannis, both religions were founded on texts with historical and biographical content, at least in part. Medieval authors inherited ancient traditions of biography and historical writing; however, history was not recognized as an autonomous scientific discipline. Instead, it was typically classified as a branch of grammar or rhetoric. Historians came from various social backgrounds and wrote for diverse audiences, frequently imitating biblical or classical models. In practice, many medieval texts were rewritings or compilations of earlier works, constructed according to established literary clichés. Modern understandings of the Middle Ages often rely heavily on a core set of canonical texts that shape interpretations of specific periods. For example, Gregory of Tours remains the principal source for sixth-century Frankish history, while Jean Froissart serves a similar role for fourteenth-century France and England. These foundational works are crucial for studying their sources, literary models, historical context, intended functions, and target audiences.

In the Middle Ages, the Latin term historia was broadly used to mean "narrative" or "account" and could refer to a wide range of texts, including epic poetry and liturgical prose. Despite this general usage, medieval writers were aware that historical writing was a distinct form of narrative. The first significant attempt to define the historical genre was made by Isidore of Seville in the 7th century, in the opening book of his Etymologiae. Isidore distinguished between fabula (fable) and historia (history). According to him:

History (historia) is a narrative of events (res gestae) by which what happened in the past is made known. The Greeks called history ἁπὸ τοῠ ἱστορεἳν, that is, "from seeing" or from knowledge. For the ancients, no one wrote history unless he was present [at the events being described] and saw for himself what he was writing about. It is better for us to see what is happening with our eyes than to hear it. For what is seen is expressed without deception. This science belongs to grammar, for everything worth remembering is conveyed by means of letters.

Isidore explained that historia was based on eyewitness observation and belonged to grammar, as history was transmitted through written language. He also defined types of historical timekeeping, such as the ephemeris (daily), the calendar (monthly), and the annals (yearly), linking the genre of history to the measurement and recording of time.

The complex relationship between truth and fiction in medieval historiography is exemplified by the works of Bede. In the preface to his Ecclesiastical History of the English People, Bede claimed adherence to the vera lex historiae ("true law of history")—a phrase borrowed from Jerome's preface to the translation of Eusebius's Chronicle. For Bede, historical truth was not strictly literal but was guided by collective memory and the rhetorical imperative to instruct. As historian Roger Ray (1980) argued, Bede followed Augustine's counsel, seeking to extract the underlying moral essence from historical events, presenting them in ways that resonated with the audience's expectations and understanding. This conception of history allowed for considerable narrative freedom. The medieval historian was concerned less with empirical accuracy than with conveying moral or theological meaning. What mattered was not precise detail, but the evocation of typical truths—the presentation of scenes and actions that illustrated eternal principles. Because verification was based on memory, judgment, or reader preference rather than empirical standards, such "fictionalized history" was difficult to falsify by modern criteria.

Cicero's classical rhetorical framework distinguished between historia (truth), argumentum (plausibility), and fabula (fiction). While Isidore and later Vincent of Beauvais were aware of this tripartite classification, medieval authors often adopted a simpler dichotomy between history and fable, typically favoring a literal interpretation of historical narratives. The authority of the historian stemmed from their alignment with religious and moral truths, not from critical investigation of causes or facts. For medieval writers, all events were part of a divine plan, and their causes were to be understood through theological reflection. The study of history made sense only in relation to the providential structure of time and salvation. Biblical exegesis—focused on Hebrew chronology, geography, and genealogy—served as the primary model. The aim of Christian historiography was to determine the role of nations, states, and churches within the sacred history of the Christian world, and to discern the ultimate meaning of events through a theological lens.

== Background of the Middle Ages' historiography (300 - 500) ==
=== Annals ===
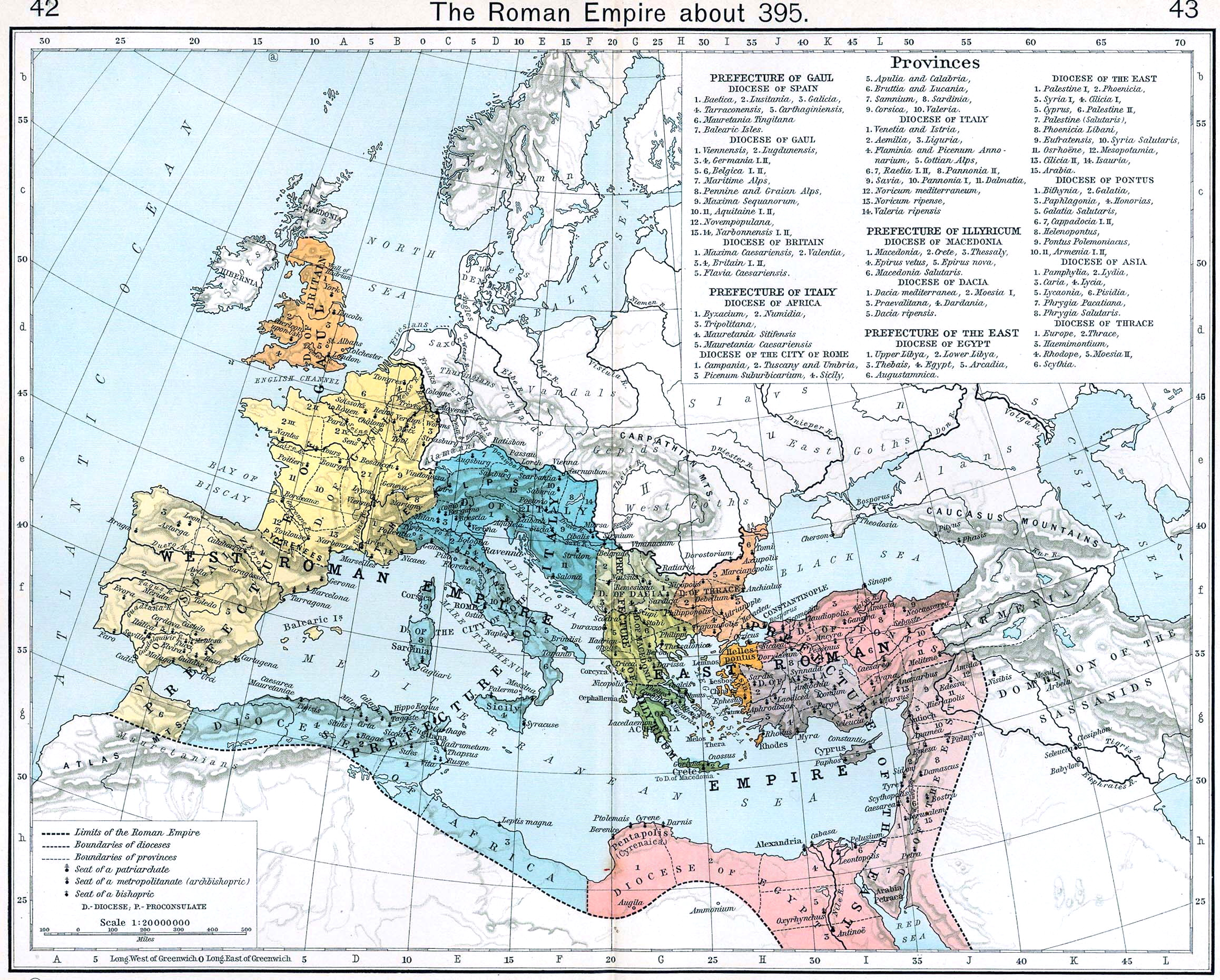
The Roman Empire in 395. Map from: Shepherd, William R.: Historical Atlas. New York: Henry Holt and Company, 1923

The development of Western medieval historiography was shaped by two parallel traditions: the chronicle and the sacred. A key influence on chronicle writing was the official Fasti consulares or Consularia, compiled regularly in Rome, Constantinople, and Ravenna until the late 6th century. These lists, compiled in 445, 456, 493, 526, and 572, recorded major events of each year and served as the foundation for historical works from the 4th to 6th centuries. With the decline of the Western Roman Empire, similar consular lists appeared in breakaway provinces. Gregory of Tours, for instance, used the now-lost Annals of Arles and Angers. The Consular Fasti also gave rise to collections like the Chronograph of 354, preserved in a 17th-century copy of an incomplete Carolingian manuscript. Theodor Mommsen attempted to reconstruct the original using related 5th-century texts. The Chronograph of 354 consisted of eight parts:

1. Calendar with emperors’ birthdays, senate sessions, and public games;
2. Consular Fasti (to 354);
3. Easter calendars (312–412);
4. List of Roman prefects (254–354);
5. List of popes (to 352);
6. A brief topography of Rome;
7. Chronographus, a world chronicle to 354;
8. Roman Chronicle to 354.

In the Latin West, after the Empire's fall, annal writing resumed in monasteries from the 6th century, often as brief notes in the Paschalia linked to specific years. Not every year was recorded. As entries accumulated, they were copied into dedicated manuscripts, none of which survive in their original form. From the late 7th century, systematic annal keeping spread in major abbeys, with monasteries exchanging documents to verify and expand their records. These could also serve as sources for the annals of newly founded monastic communities.

=== The Sacred History of Eusebius-Jerome ===
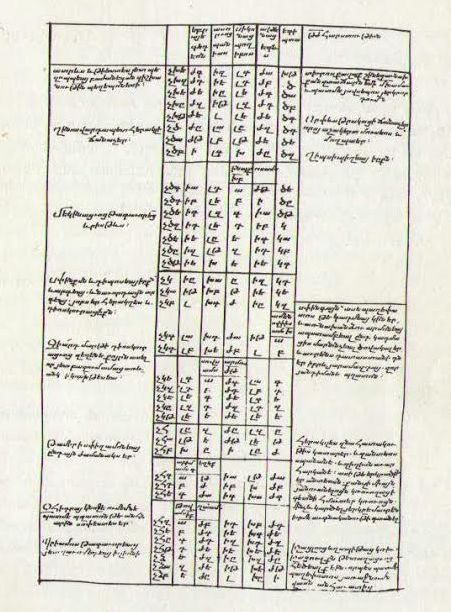
Page of the Armenian translation of Chronicle by Eusebius of Caesarea. 13rd century manuscript.

In the 4th century, a new type of historical writing emerged that profoundly influenced medieval historiography: the Christian world chronicle. This form arose in a context where the traditional Roman concept of history, centered on the Eternal City, had declined in importance. After Diocletian's reforms and the division of the empire, Rome lost its central status, and Roman history came to be seen as part of a broader historical framework. It was increasingly replaced by Historia sacra, the sacred history of the Jews and the Christian Church, encompassing the Mediterranean and the Middle East. The earliest example of this new historiographical model was the Chronicle of Julius Africanus, completed around 234.

The basic chronological structure had earlier been outlined by Hippolytus of Rome in his commentary on the Book of Daniel. He proposed that world history spanned 7,000 years, drawing on biblical texts such as Psalm 89:4 and 2 Peter 3:8. The six days of creation were equated with 6,000 years of history, followed by a final 1,000-year "Sabbath." According to this scheme, Christ's birth occurred 5,500 years after creation, with the Crucifixion marking the midpoint of history. Hippolytus dated his own time to the year 5,738 from creation, integrating sacred chronology into historical time and discouraging apocalyptic expectations.

Eusebius of Caesarea expanded and systematized this approach in his Chronicle, later translated into Latin by Jerome of Stridon—forming what is known as the Eusebius–Jerome tradition. Eusebius’ work had two parts: an introduction summarizing the histories of various nations and a Chronological Canon, which presented synchronistic tables from the creation of the world to 324 CE. Jerome translated only the tables, extending them to 378, while the introduction survives only in Armenian. Eusebius aligned biblical events with secular history—for example, equating the era of Samson with the Trojan War, and dating the start of Christ's ministry to the 15th year of Tiberius and the 4th year of the 201st Olympiad. He placed Christ's birth in the year 5199 from creation, though he did not use this event as the starting point of his chronology. Eusebius departed from the rhetorical traditions of ancient historiography, which included invented speeches, and instead based his work on documentary sources. This method served both apologetic and anti-heretical aims and helped establish the chronicle, centered on apostolic succession, as the core form of Christian historical writing.

Jerome adapted Eusebius’ system for a Roman audience, maintaining its theological framework while ending his chronicle with the Gothic invasion and the death of the Arian emperor Valens at Hadrianople. This event renewed apocalyptic concerns. Jerome also outlined ways to extend the chronicle, and later continuations, such as the Chronicle of 452, followed his model. Other chroniclers in this tradition included Rufinus, Sulpicius Severus, Cassiodorus, Orosius, Prosper of Aquitaine, and Marius of Avenches, continuing the narrative to as late as 581. Each work offered distinct content and varied in popularity. For example, Sulpicius Severus' Chronicle from the Beginning of the World survives in a single manuscript, while Orosius’ Seven Books Against the Pagans circulated widely in over 200 copies. Sulpicius Severus, who extended his Sacred History to 403, emphasized the continuity of divine revelation and integrated the prophetic timeline into world history. He advanced the concept of four world ages—Babylon (gold), Persia (silver), Macedonia (bronze), and Rome (iron)—interpreting Rome as renewed through the Church, founded by the Apostle Peter ("the rock"). Though he focused on the Old Testament and avoided allegorical exegesis, Sulpicius was more critical of its chronology than Eusebius. He employed a literal reading and wrote in polished Latin, following classical models such as Sallust, Caesar, Livy, and Tacitus. According to M. Leistner, he produced "the best historical account of the fifth century".

=== Paul Orosius and Augustine of Hippo ===
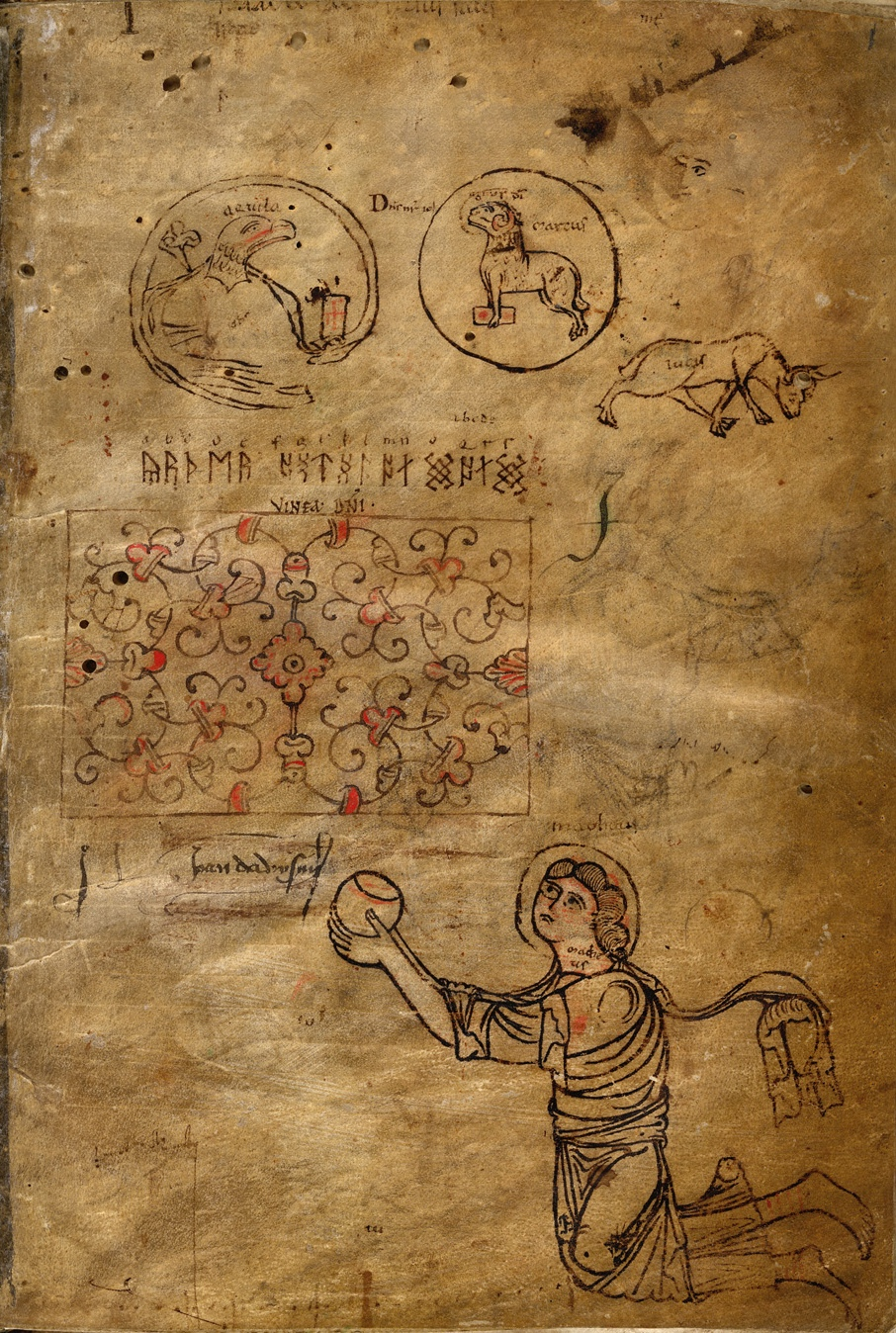
Orosia Tollemache manuscript (BL MS Add 47967) folio 1 recto with astrological and evangelical symbols and runic alphabet with Latin equivalents. Between 892 and 925, British Library

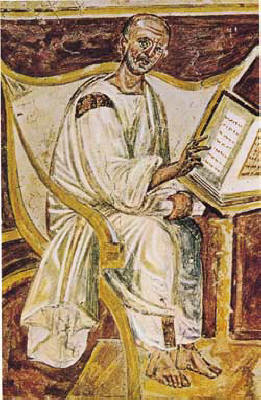
St. Augustine. Fresco of the Sancta Sanctorum Chapel in Lateran. VI century

The Spanish priest Paul Orosius and Augustine of Hippo are frequently linked by scholars. Fleeing to North Africa after the Gothic sack of Rome in 410, Orosius became Augustine's disciple. Deeply affected by the fall of Rome, both sought to defend Christianity against pagan accusations that the catastrophe was divine punishment for abandoning the traditional gods. Augustine commissioned Orosius to write an apologetic historical work, completed around 417. However, Theodor Mommsen demonstrated that Orosius' History Against the Pagans was largely based on the Eusebius–Jerome tradition. Orosius was not highly educated, and his work, a compilation of Jerome, Sulpicius Severus, and some pagan authors, was seen by Augustine as unsatisfactory. He often included legendary and unreliable material and interpreted pre-Christian history as a period dominated by punishment for original sin. Petrarch later called him “the collector of all the troubles of the world.” As a result, Orosius viewed the barbarian invasions not as extraordinary calamities but as relatively mild in comparison to earlier disasters. This view was shaped by his anti-Roman sentiment and his aim to demonstrate that history improved following the rise of the Church under Constantine. For instance, he claimed that while plagues and locusts once caused immense devastation, such events became less destructive after the Incarnation. Orosius preserved the Eusebius–Jerome scheme of four successive kingdoms (Babylonian, Persian, Macedonian, Roman) but introduced a numerological framework based on the number seven. Each kingdom lasted 700 years, and key events, such as the great fire of Rome, were interpreted in multiples of seven. Although Augustine regarded the chronicle as a historical background to his own City of God, he did not mention Orosius by name. Nevertheless, their works were seen as complementary, and Orosius remained influential until the Renaissance. His chronicle is also a crucial source for the early history of the Visigothic Kingdom.

Augustine, in contrast, developed a far more complex and theologically grounded view of history, the state, and civil society, particularly in Books XIV–XVIII of De civitate Dei. His City of God was not identical with the institutional Church but was conceived as a spiritual community of the righteous, stretching from the patriarchs and prophets of the Old Testament to all Christians after Christ. In this vision, earthly cities, especially Rome, are transient and corrupted by pride and violence. Augustine compared Rome's founders, Romulus and Cain, as archetypes of fratricidal ambition. While condemning Rome's injustices, Augustine left open the possibility of its renewal, contingent on divine will. Unlike the Manichaeans, whose sect he once followed, Augustine did not view the material world as intrinsically evil but as estranged from God. The City of God could also be interpreted in monastic terms—as a spiritual withdrawal from the sinful world. In Book XVIII, he discussed periodization, briefly adopting the Eusebian-Jerome division into the eras before and after Christ, and mentioned only Assyria and Rome among the kingdoms. Augustine offered his fullest theory of historical periods in his anti-Manichaean exegesis of the six days of creation. Rejecting millenarian interpretations, he proposed a symbolic scheme aligning historical epochs with the stages of human life (borrowed from Cicero):

1. Infancy (infantia) — from Adam to Noah;
2. Childhood (pueritia) — from Noah to Abraham;
3. Adolescence (adolescentia) — from Abraham to David;
4. Youth (iuventus) — from David to the Babylonian captivity;
5. Maturity (gravitas) — the Babylonian captivity;
6. Old age (senectus) — the preaching of Christ.

A seventh, future age corresponds to the end of history. Augustine warned against speculating on its timing, emphasizing that believers already participate in the City of God through spiritual rebirth and faith. This eschatological framework became foundational to the medieval concept of universal history.

== Early Middle Ages (500—1000) ==
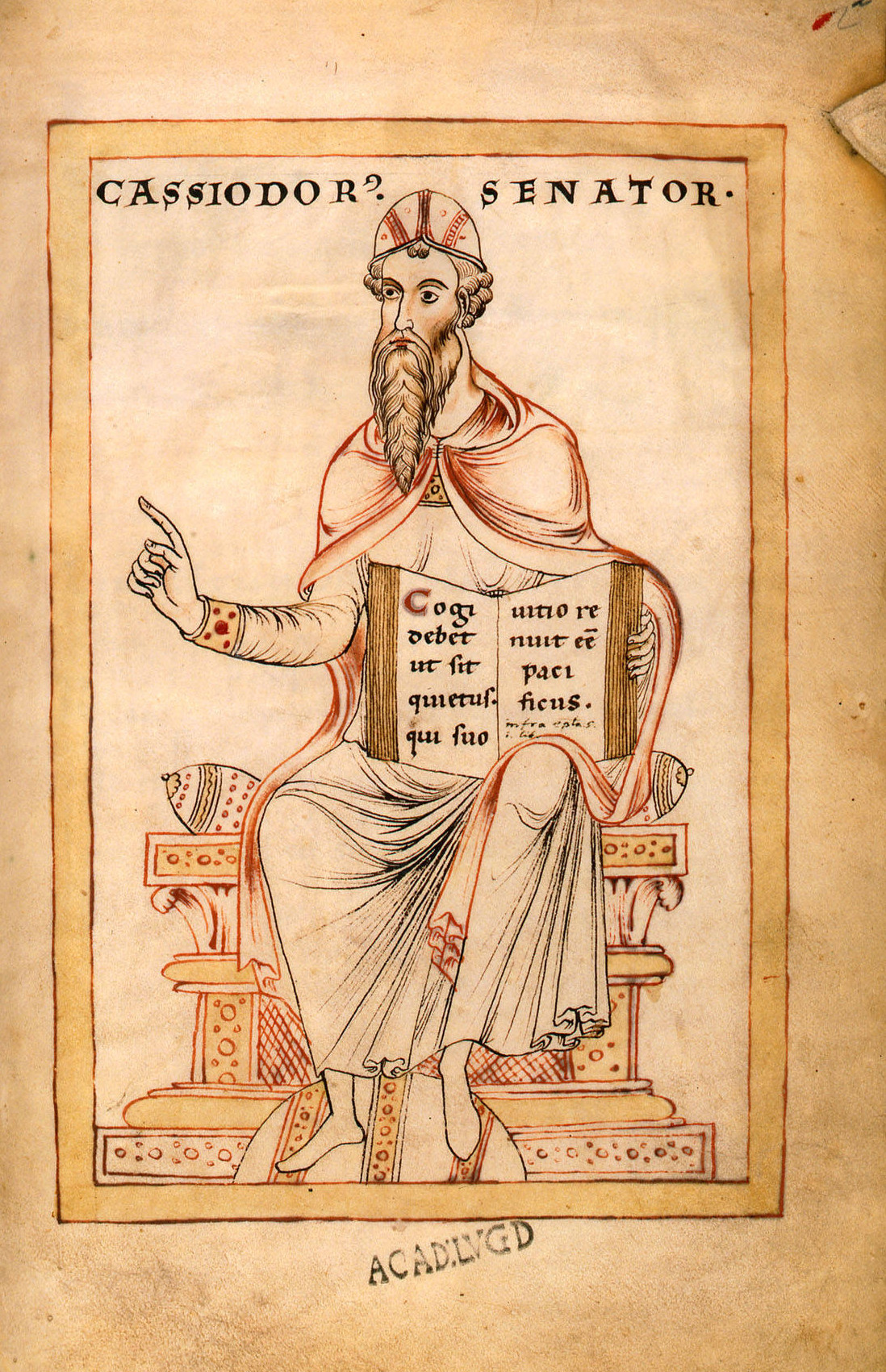
Depiction of Cassiodorus in the manuscript of the Gesta Theodorici. 1170s, Fulda Abbey

Although Augustine's concept of the two cities and two ages was not intended as a historical theory and did not imply linear development, it exerted considerable influence on universal historical constructions in the 7th and 8th centuries, particularly in the works of Isidore of Seville and Bede the Venerable. It also contributed to the eventual emergence of the medieval chronicle genre, which appeared later. Unlike Augustine, who wrote in a polemical context, Isidore and Bede did not need to defend the faith against active opposition or refute rival doctrines. Medieval historical writing functioned primarily as a product of the universal institution of the Church and only secondarily as a record of local communities, kingdoms, or peoples. Historical narratives were largely derived from earlier texts, with authors deliberately continuing the works of their predecessors to maintain a sense of unbroken tradition, reflecting the medieval worldview of historical continuity.

In early medieval historiography, entire nations often served as the protagonists. Cassiodorus and Jordanes focused on the Goths; Isidore on the Visigoths; Gregory of Tours on the Franks; Paul the Deacon on the Lombards; and Gildas on the Britons. The structure of these histories followed the model of Paul Orosius: ancient peoples, including Greeks and Romans, lived in ignorance of God and were thus punished through calamity and conquest. Although God no longer intervened directly as in the Old Testament, He remained active in history, rewarding righteousness and punishing sin. This framework explained historical change through the moral condition of peoples—whether they were sinful or righteous. Gildas, for instance, interpreted the Anglo-Saxon conquest of Britain as divine punishment for the Britons’ sins. Christian historians acknowledged a divine plan but emphasized human agency and collective responsibility; both individuals and nations could be subject to divine retribution. Gregory of Tours, for example, contrasted the fates of Clovis and Alaric to illustrate the blessings given to orthodox Christians and the misfortunes of heretics. The notion of a "new chosen people" gained particular importance in the historiography of the Germanic kingdoms. Just as God had once guided the Jews, He was now understood to be leading the Christian peoples. Following the fall of the Roman Empire, some historians identified this divine election with their own nations’ emerging statehood. This idea found its clearest expression in the Ecclesiastical History of Bede the Venerable, who interpreted the English as a people chosen by God in the Christian era.

=== The reception of antiquity in Italy: Cassiodorus ===
Flavius Magnus Aurelius Cassiodorus Senator came from a noble Syrian family that served the Roman Empire throughout the 5th century and was related to Boethius. As a very young man, Cassiodorus began his court career under the Ostrogothic king Theodoric. His career developed successfully: in 514 he was appointed consul, and between 523 and 527, succeeding the executed Boethius as magister officiorum, he was involved in the accounting of documents and the compilation of official letters. In 519 he completed his Chronicle, timed to coincide with the brief Byzantine-Gothic alliance. In terms of content, Cassiodorus' work reproduced the standard consular annals, in the traditional fastiae genre, beginning with Lucius Junius Brutus, but inscribed in Eusebius' concept of ecclesiastical chronography: the first ruler to unite temporal and spiritual power is named Ninus, after whom 25 Assyrian kings who reigned for 852 years are enumerated, then the succession of power passes to Latinus and Aeneas, who transfer it to Roman kings from Romulus to Lucius Tarquinius Superbus. It was only then when the consular succession as such began.

The propagandistic orientation of the Chronicle is obvious: the fact that the heir to the Gothic throne —Eutharic— became a Roman consul is presented as the beginning of a new stage in world history, that is, the Goths were transferred by Cassiodorus from the category of "barbarians" to the category of "historical peoples", which before him in ancient historiography were only Greeks and Romans. The propagandistic orientation of the Chronicle led to various distortions: in 402, when the war between the Goths and Stilicho is described, the victory is attributed to the Goths; when it comes to the sack of Rome by the Goths in 410, the "mercy" of Alaric is almost exclusively described. Describing the Battle of the Catalaunian Plains, Cassiodorus wrote that the Goths fought with Aetius against the Huns, without specifying that they were Visigoths, and that Theodoric's father Theodemir and all his tribesmen were only on Attila's side.

At about the same time, Cassiodorus undertook the writing of the History of the Goths in 12 books, which was also commissioned by Theodoric, who wanted to "make the history of the Goths a Roman history". Judging by the range of authors cited, his material was used by Jordanes in his small work The Origin and Deeds of the Getae. Cassiodorus' History of the Goths is the first history of a barbarian people written by a Roman, precisely for the purpose of including the history of the Goths in the universal process. The same means that Theodoric, as a barbarian ruler who assimilated Roman traditions, perfectly understood the role of history and books in general in political propaganda. Later, Gregory of Tours, in his History of the Franks, expressed the same idea: it is the description of a "new" historical people, which in the ancient past was classified as barbarian. Cassiodorus' work on the Goths has not survived, perhaps it was destroyed after the fall of the Ostgothic kingdom and the Senator's move to Constantinople. Later, having founded one of the first European scriptoriums, the Vivarium, Cassiodorus made great efforts to preserve and disseminate the ancient book heritage, including historical works. In his treatise Institutions, Cassiodorus listed a number of historical texts that he considered fundamental, which were then considered normative and spread throughout the libraries of the Latin West. These included Josephus Flavius' Antiquities of the Jews and The Jewish War (he was perceived as an ecclesiastical historian); Eusebius of Caesarea's Ecclesiastical History translated by Rufinus; and its sequel, Cassiodorus' own History in Three Parts; History against the Gentiles by Paul Orosius, the surviving history books of Ammianus Marcellinus, the Chronicle of Prosper of Aquitaine, and the two works On Eminent Husbands by Jerome and Gennadius. These works were available in practically all large monastic libraries. According to B. Gene, "Cassiodorus' choice determined Western historical culture for a thousand years to come": the same set of texts was in the possession of William of Malmesbury in the twelfth century and Hartmann Schedel in the fifteenth. It was these works that the first printers began to publish before 1500.

=== The reception of antiquity in Spain and Britain ===
==== Isidore of Seville ====
Isidore of Seville, a key intellectual figure of the Visigothic Kingdom, embodied the classical belief that human nature was oriented toward both contemplation and action, with self-knowledge as a central goal. For Isidore, history was not only a means of understanding divine providence but also a domain of human agency. This perspective aligned with the ambitions of the ruling elites of the post-Roman barbarian kingdoms, who sought to integrate themselves into the Roman cultural and political legacy through a Christianized restoration of Roman unity. Accordingly, historical writing served to legitimize and clarify the origins and establishment of the Gothic people.

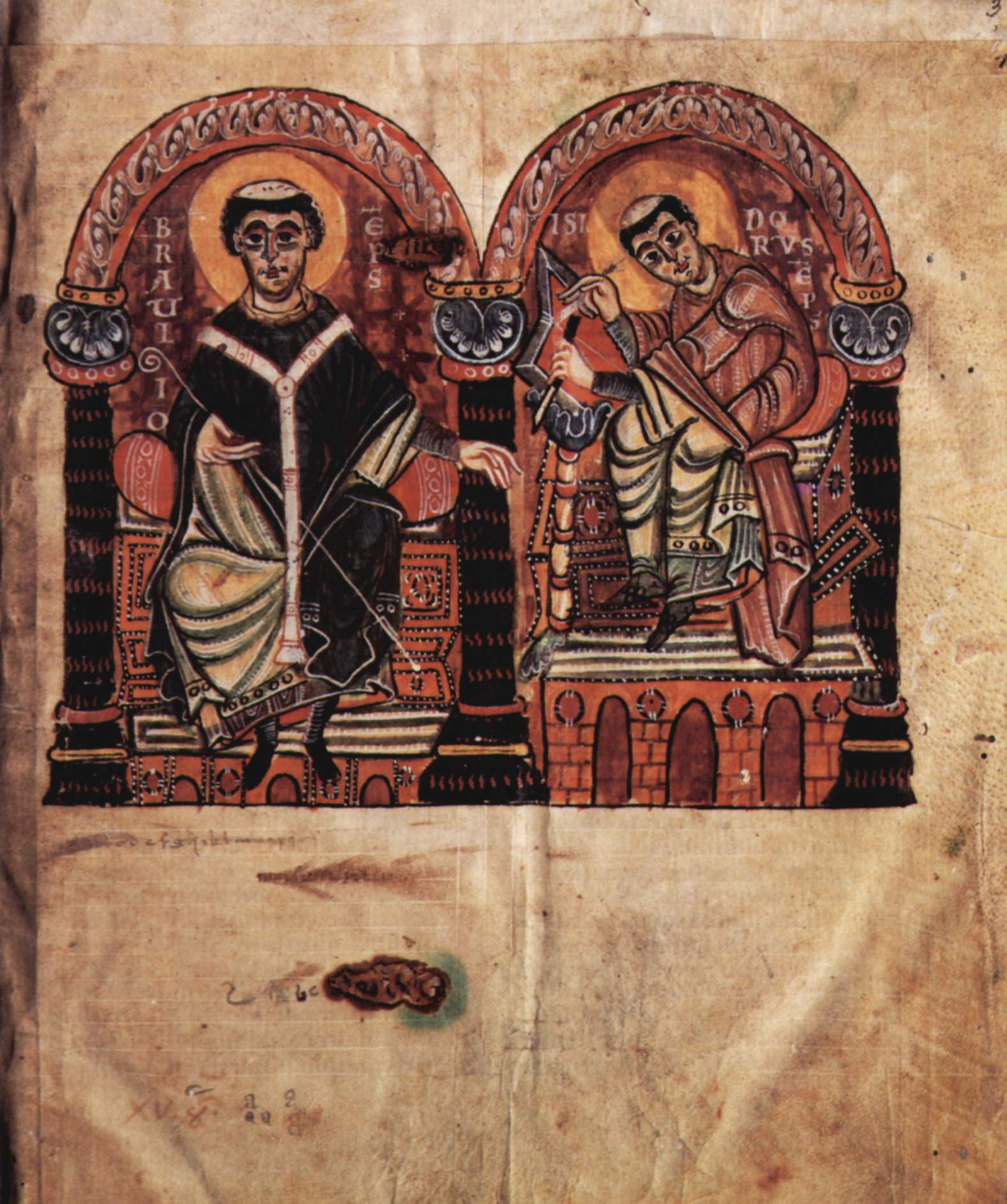
Image of Bishop Braulio of Zaragoza and Isidore of Seville from a 10th-century manuscript

Isidore's historical framework was rooted in the Spanish Era calendar, beginning in 38 BCE. Unlike Augustine's speculative and theological reflections on the direction and meaning of history, Isidore accepted and elaborated the standard Christian historiographical model without deviation. Following Augustine, he divided history into seven ages:

1. Infancy — from Adam to Noah (10 generations);
2. Childhood — from Noah to Abraham (10 generations);
3. Adolescence — from Abraham to David (40 generations);
4. Youth — from David to the Babylonian captivity (40 generations);
5. Maturity — from the Babylonian captivity to the birth of Christ (40 generations);
6. The beginning of sunset and old age — from the preaching of the gospel to the end of the world (as many generations as from Adam to the last);
7. The seventh day is the end of time and history, the Kingdom of God on earth.

In his History of the Goths, Isidore did not distinguish clearly between Ostrogoths and the Visigoths, though he addressed the history of both. His narrative emphasized the emergence of a strong, divinely sanctioned state under capable kings who established and defended the true faith. Particular praise is given to rulers like Reccared and Sisebut, who promoted peace and unity between Visigoths and Spanish-Romans. A defining feature of Isidore's worldview is the disappearance of the ideological divide between Romans and barbarians that had characterized earlier centuries. In his historical vision, Goths and Hispano-Romans shared a unified homeland and future. This vision was reinforced through a favorable portrayal of Spain in contrast to the rest of the world. Isidore's antipathy toward the Franks is subtly conveyed: although he was well-versed in Latin literature and frequently cited Spanish and Italian authors, he pointedly avoided quoting any authors from Roman or Frankish Gaul, even those widely respected in the West. He also used the ethnonym Francus to evoke the Latin ferocia (“savagery”), highlighting his disdain. Similarly, Isidore showed hostility toward the Byzantine East, stemming from both political rivalry and theological suspicion. As an orthodox Catholic, he viewed the Eastern Churches, which did not fully accept Roman papal authority, as heretical. This reinforced his preference for a Western, Visigothic-centered Christian identity.

==== Bede the Venerable ====
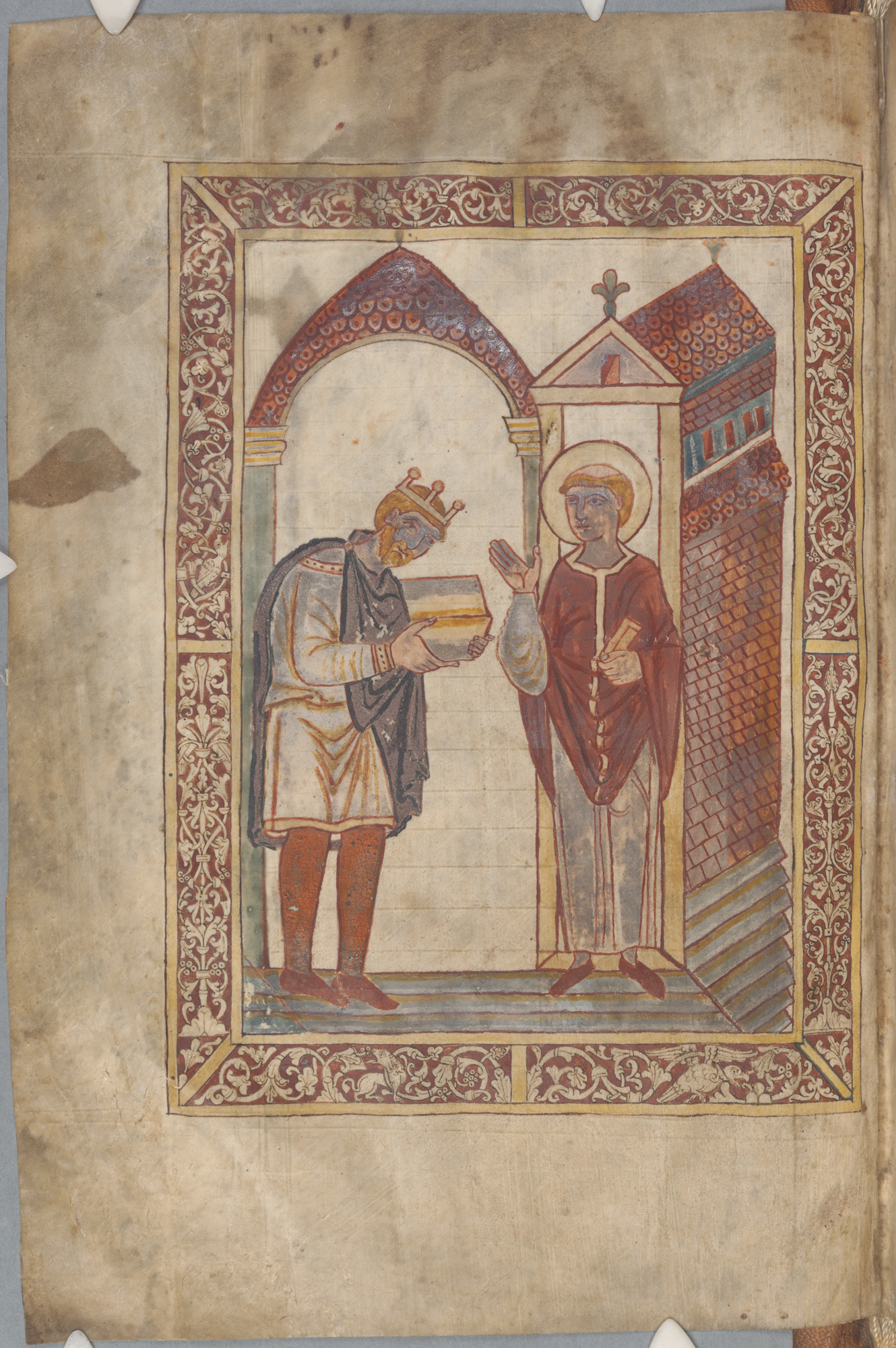
King Athelstan presents the Gospel to St. Cuthbert, who died two centuries earlier. Miniature of the Life of St. Cuthbert (Cambridge, Corpus Christi College, manuscript MS 183, fol. 1v), ca. 930

Bede the Venerable received the finest education available in Anglo-Saxon Britain. Fluent in Latin and Greek, he spent most of his life teaching at the monastery of Wearmouth-Jarrow, leaving it only twice. Through his work on calculating Easter and reconciling Jewish, Roman, and Anglo-Saxon calendars, Bede developed a method adopted by the Catholic Church for centuries. He also addressed broader questions of historical time, forming a distinctive philosophy of history. Bede viewed time as linear—created by God, moving from past to future, and oriented toward its consummation. Yet, his allegorical reading of Scripture led him to see time as symmetrical, centered on the Incarnation of Christ. All events were thus interpreted in relation to this turning point, with "before" and "after" reflecting one another. This approach allowed parallels between the Old and New Testaments and permitted the Anglo-Saxons to be seen as a new chosen people.

Drawing on Augustine's the City of God and Isidore of Seville's Chronicles, Bede adopted a six-period framework for human history, corresponding to the ages of man and the days of creation. He believed the world had entered its old age with the Nativity:

1. Adam to Noah (infancy): 10 generations, 1,656 years; ended with the Flood;
2. Noah to Abraham (childhood): 10 generations, 292 years; marked by the creation of Hebrew;
3. Abraham to David (youth): 14 generations, 942 years; begins Christ's genealogy.
4. David to Babylonian Captivity (maturity): 473 years; era of kings.
5. Captivity to Nativity (old age): 589 years; a time of moral decline.
6. Birth of Christ to 725: a pre-mortal state, not limited by generations, ending with the Last Judgment.

Bede's chronology includes inconsistencies, as he used both the Septuagint and the Hebrew Bible. In On the Calculation of Times, chapters 67 and 69, he introduces two additional epochs. The seventh—animarum Sabbatum or "Sabbath of souls"—runs parallel to the sixth, describing the souls of saints resting with Christ until the resurrection. The eighth epoch follows the Judgment and marks eternal life. Bede calculated 3,952 years from creation to the Nativity—1,259 fewer than Isidore's count—raising questions about the duration of the final age. If each age paralleled a millennium, then at least 2,000 years would separate the Incarnation and the Judgment, a longer span than earlier theologians proposed. Still, Bede emphasized that attempts to date the Judgment contradicted Christian doctrine; believers must always be prepared.

Bede was among the first medieval authors to articulate a cohesive historical vision. His Ecclesiastical History of the English People, spanning from the Roman conquest in 55 B.C. to 731, followed the chronicle style of his time. He stressed the unity of the Church and its continuity with Rome. The Roman conquest, in Bede's view, was part of divine providence, enabling the spread of Christianity. He even suggested that the Anglo-Saxon Church, as foreseen in God's plan, existed spiritually before missionaries arrived in Britain. His work illustrates how historical texts could shape collective identity among their readers.

=== Carolingian period ===
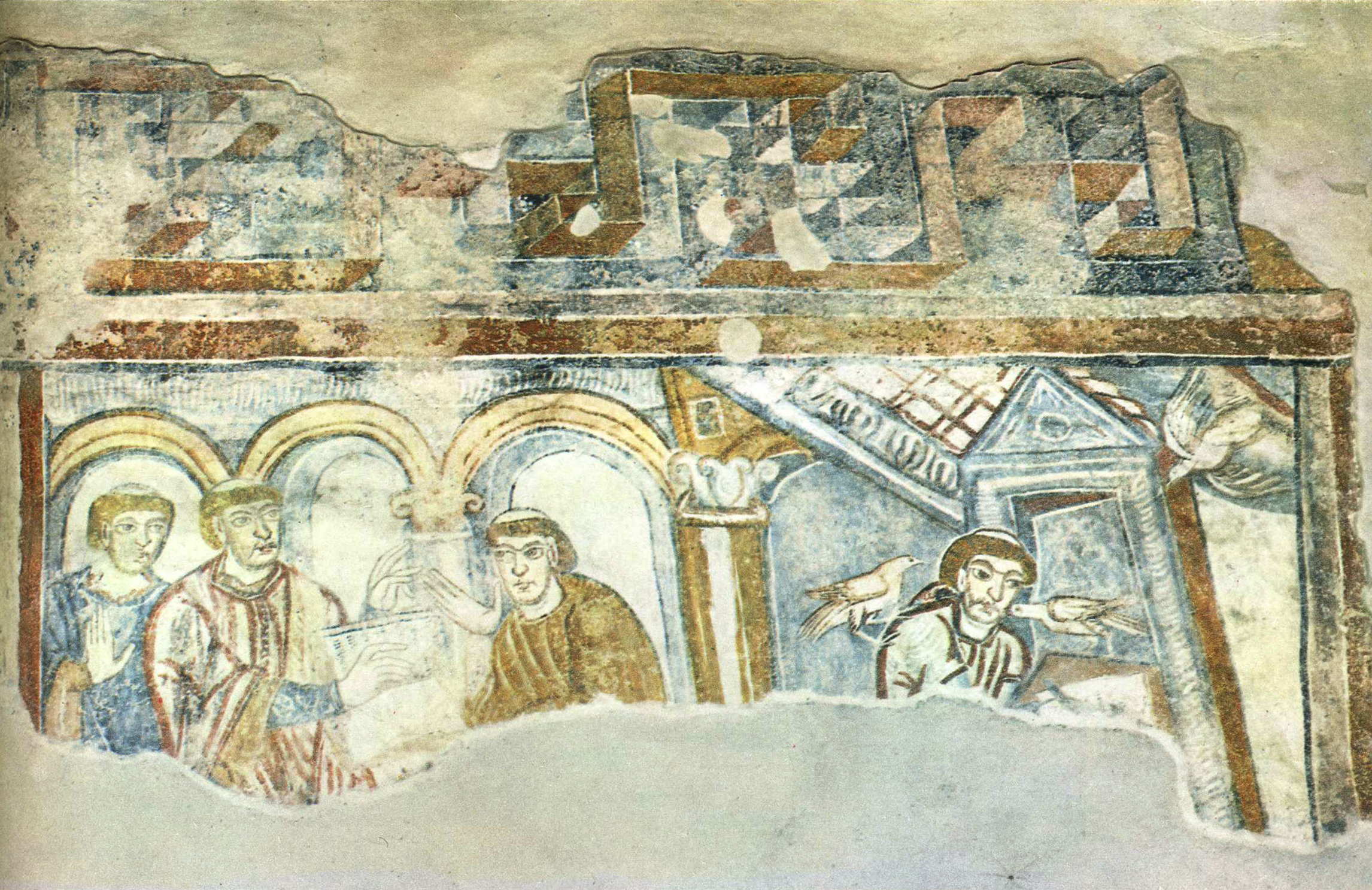
Deeds of the Saints. Remains of a Carolingian fresco from the church of St. Benedict in Malsa. Italy, ca. 825

The creation of the Carolingian Empire, understood by contemporaries as a "restoration" of Rome, significantly revived interest in antiquity in the Latin West. The earliest surviving manuscripts of classical authors such as Caesar, Suetonius, and Tacitus were produced in monastic scriptoria during the late eighth and ninth centuries. Historical themes—especially those of Orosius—gained prominence; the throne room of the imperial palace at Ingelheim was decorated with frescoes inspired by his works. According to Ermoldus Nigellus, these depicted figures such as Cyrus, Ninus, Romulus and Remus, Hannibal of Carthage, Alexander the Great, and the Roman emperors Augustus, Constantine, and Theodosius. Each figure was portrayed at two events, in accordance with the plots of Orosius. Alcuin introduced Bede's Ecclesiastical History of the English People to the Carolingian court, where it was transcribed around 800 in the palace scriptorium. Bede's work soon surpassed all other national histories, including that of Isidore of Seville, in popularity. А. I. Sidorov observed that Carolingian intellectuals focused on both ecclesiastical history and the intertwined destinies of the Trojans, Jews, and Romans, aligning these narratives with the mythic origins of the Franks. Einhardt noted that Charlemagne enjoyed listening to accounts of ancient deeds during meals and leisure, a habit that likely influenced the tastes of the elite. In his Vita Karoli Magni, Einhard adopted the stylistic model of ancient hagiographies, particularly those of Suetonius, whose texts were preserved at Fulda. He regretted the absence of information about Charlemagne's youth—a gap that, as Sidorov suggests, might have been filled differently had Einhard been educated at Lorsch or Reichenau, where other literary traditions prevailed.

During the Carolingian period, the practice of dating events ab Incarnatione Domini ("from the Incarnation of the Lord") became widespread. Although concerns about the "millennial problem" had emerged in some Christian circles two centuries earlier, by the late ninth century, Incarnation-based chronology had largely supplanted earlier systems—even in royal chancelleries.

==== Freculf's universal chronicle ====
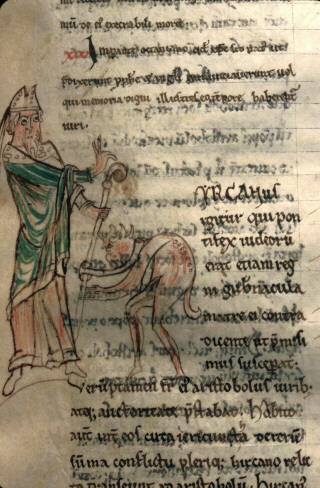
A page from the manuscript of Freculf's history. 9th century

Freculf of Lisieux, a Carolingian polymath and member of Charlemagne's scholarly court, died around 850. His History in twelve books, a universal chronicle, was dedicated in two parts: the first to Empress Judith of Bavaria and the second to Charles the Bald. According to Michael Allen, the work represents the culmination of a historiographical tradition rooted in Eusebius and Augustine. In the Patrologia Latina edition by Migne, the text spans 340 large-format pages.

Structured as a universal chronicle up to the year 827 and the career of the iconoclast Claudius of Turin, Freculf's work divides humanity's history into two overarching epochs: before (seven books) and after the Incarnation (five books). The temple—Jewish, pagan, and Christian—serves as the central symbolic axis of the narrative. Freculf presents the first two ages of mankind as preparatory for the Augustinian opposition of the Earthly and Heavenly Cities, addressing his subsequent narrative to future citizens of the City of God. Freculf also introduced the Trojan origin myth of the Franks, though he elsewhere suggests a Scandinavian origin. He is notable as the first Latin author to recognize his own era as fundamentally distinct from earlier times. Michael Allen describes temples as the "topos and punctuation" of Freculf's chronicle. The conversion of the Roman Pantheon into a Christian church symbolized for him the historical shift by which the Franks and Lombards replaced the Romans and Goths as rulers of Gaul and Italy. Freculf explicitly addressed the Carolingian elite, presenting history as a "mirror" through which the reader could locate themselves within the City of God by contemplating the Empire's deeds, saints, teachings, and triumphs. He reinterpreted the traditional Eusebius-Jerome schema of historical ages: after Adam came the post-Flood age, followed by epochs designated as Abraham, Exodus, First Temple, Second Temple, and the Nativity. For the sixth and seventh ages, he relied on Bede. Though he extensively used Orosius’ History Against the Pagans, Freculf removed all references to the four kingdoms motif, replacing them with new rhetorical forms suited to a distinct historical consciousness—yet still within the framework of divine providence.

=== Carolingian annals ===
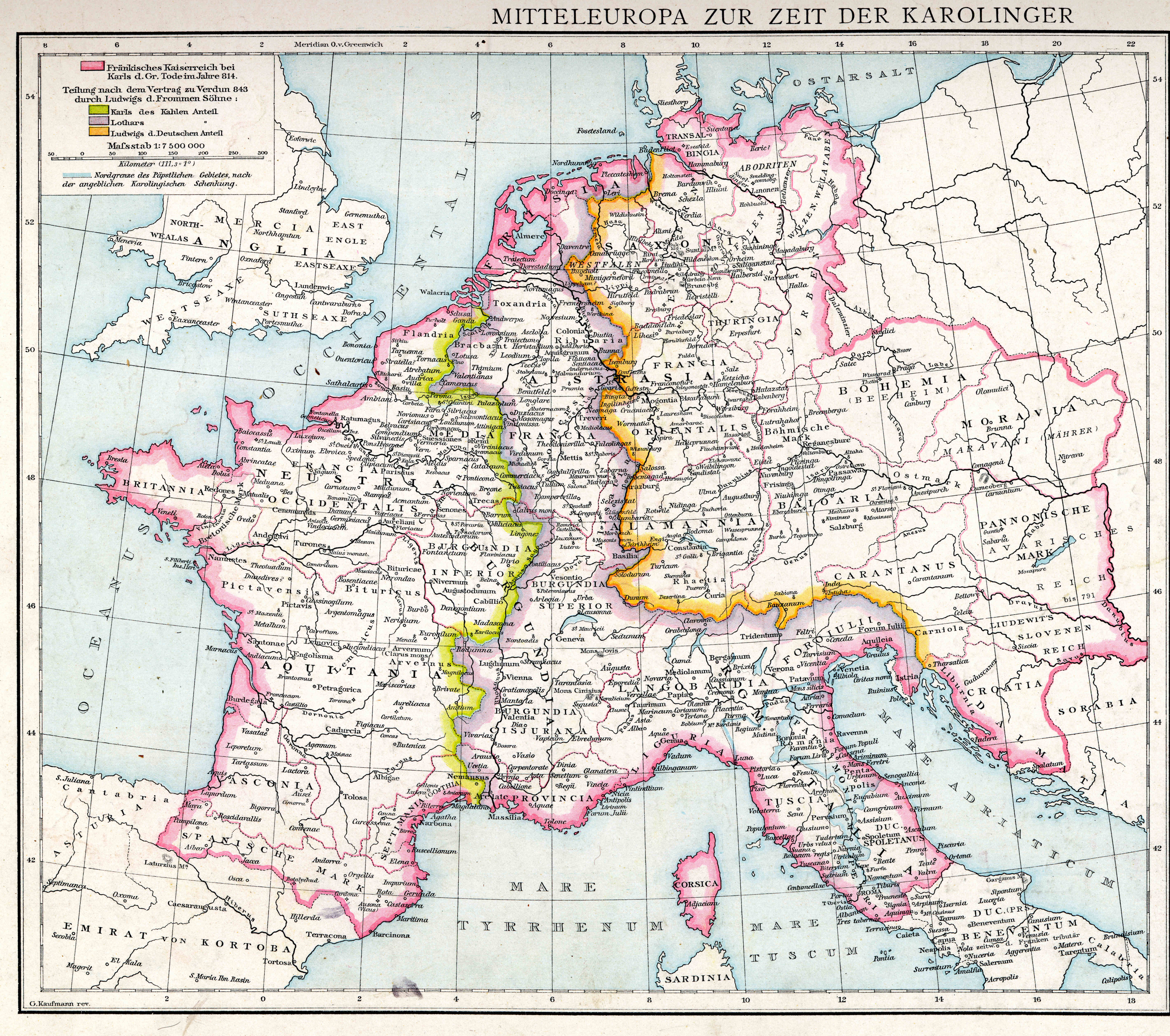
The Carolingian Empire and its partition in 843. Map from: Professor J. G. Droysens Allgemeiner historischer Handatlas, 1886

The leading intellectuals of Alcuin's circle—such as his disciple Rabanus Maurus, Rabanus's student Lupus of Ferrières, and Lupus's disciple Heiric of Auxerre—did not produce original historical works or commentaries. The ancient and early medieval manuscripts they used circulated between the imperial court and a few major monasteries. Consequently, Carolingian historiography appeared largely self-contained and independent, with minimal reliance on earlier historical traditions. Knowledge of previous historiography was highly uneven—geographically, socially, and culturally—resulting in limited influence on Carolingian writers. The most notable outcomes of this independent effort were numerous monastic chronicles and brief court annals of an official nature. Some Gallic monasteries attempted to compile composite annals, but an official chronicle of the Frankish monarchy emerged only at the end of the eighth century. The earliest version of this chronicle was likely composed in 795 and expanded until 829. Known as the Annales laureshamenses (from Lorsch), the manuscript reflected both the erudition and the ideological bias of its compilers, serving as an apologia for the ruling dynasty. After the Treaty of Verdun in 843, official historiography split regionally: the Annales Bertiniani for the West, the Annales Fuldenses and the Annales Xantenses for the East. The Annales Vedastini, focused on the northern and northeastern West Frankish realm, continued the Annales Bertiniani. Official annals declined by the late ninth century. In 882, Hincmar of Reims, the final compiler of the Annales Bertiniani, used the chronicle to enhance his own reputation and discredit his rivals. The Vedastine Annals conclude in 900, and the Fuldenses in 901. Freculf's Chronicle served as a model for Regino of Prüm, whose work begins with the Nativity and extends to 907. Regino summarized recent decades briefly and cautiously, often employing ambiguous language. His approach marked a shift toward restraint in recounting contemporary events.

A unique contribution to Carolingian historiography is Count Nithgard's On the Dissension of the Sons of Louis the Pious, which offers a somber contrast between Charlemagne's prosperous reign and the subsequent decline. It is also a critical source, preserving the Old French and Old High German texts of the Oaths of Strasbourg of 842 and a rare account of the Saxon Stelling rebellion—blamed on Charles the Bald's intrigues.

In addition to universal chronicles commissioned by secular rulers, several other annalistic traditions persisted. The Liber Pontificalis, initiated in sixth-century Rome and falsely attributed to Pope Damasus, catalogued papal biographies from Peter to Pope Martin V (d. 1431). Similar ecclesiastical traditions include the Gesta Episcoporum and Gesta Abbatum—chronicles of bishops and abbots that flourished especially during the Carolingian period. This genre originated with Gregory of Tours, who appended a list of the bishops of Tours to his History of the Franks, modeled after the Liber Pontificalis. Each entry included biographical details, ecclesiastical foundations, decrees, tenure, and burial. Though this tradition lapsed after the eighth century, it was revived under the Carolingians by Bishop Angilramn of Metz, who commissioned Paul the Deacon to write the Gesta Episcoporum Mettensium. The chronicle opened with a symbolic account of the Ascension and Pentecost, traced episcopal succession from St. Clement—appointed by Peter—to Arnulf, forefather of the Carolingians, and concluded with Chrodegang, who restored liturgical unity between the Frankish and Roman Churches. Monastic chronicles also emphasized dynastic ties. The Annals of Fontenelle, for instance, linked their founder, St. Wandregisel, to Bishop Arnulf. The Annals of St. Gall, written by the monk Rutpert, asserted the abbey's blood relation to the imperial house to protect its rights against the Bishop of Constance. Meanwhile, the episcopal chronicles of Ravenna and Naples maintained a tradition independent of Carolingian influence.

=== The Otto's age ===
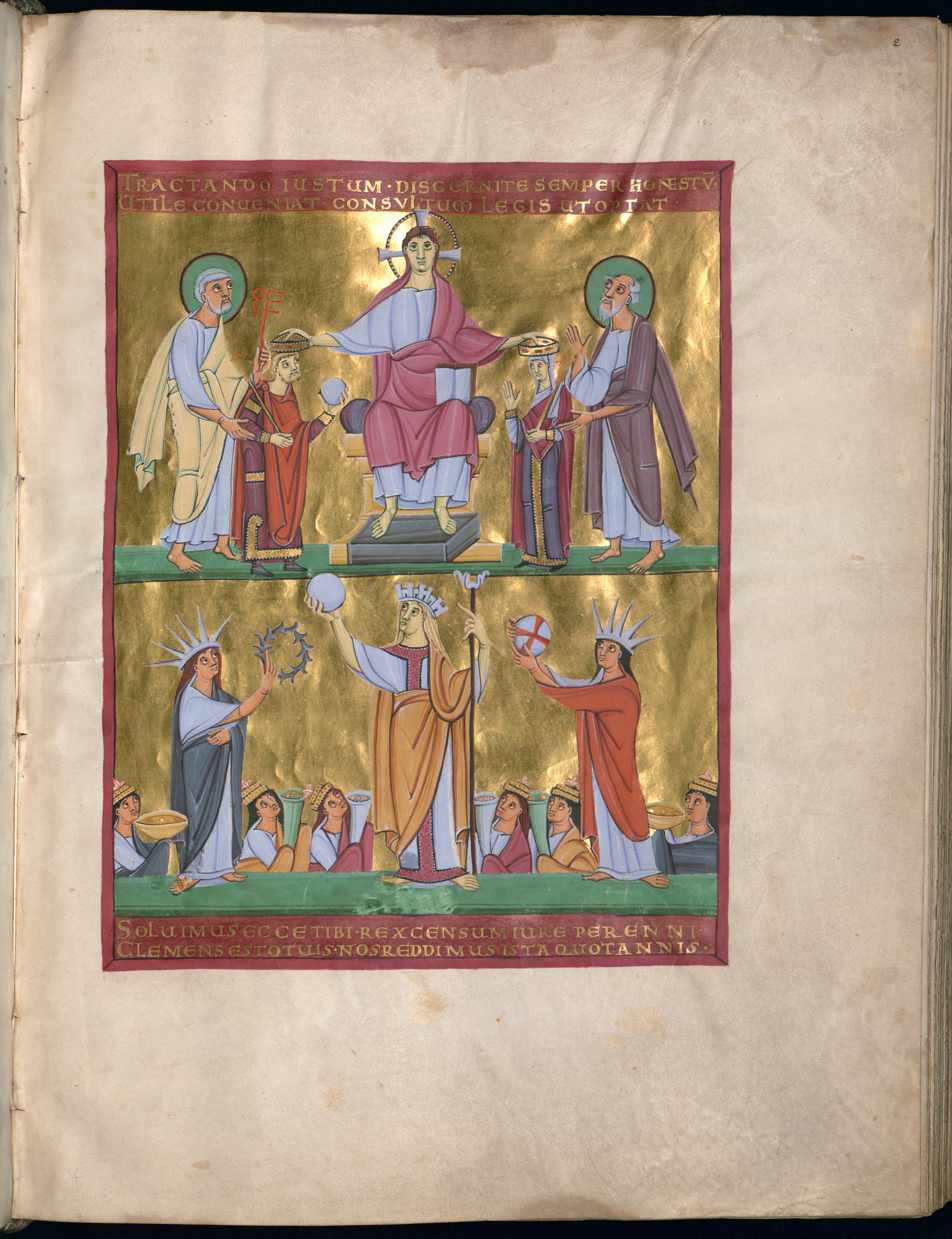
Emperor Henry II the Holy and his wife Kunigunda, crowned by Christ, and supported by the Apostles Peter and Paul. Below are allegories of Germany, Gaul, and Rome. Manuscript Bayrische Staatsbibliothek, CIm 4452, Fol. 2r. Transcribed and illuminated in Reichenau between 1007 and 1012

Historians generally agree that after the 840s, courtly and ecclesiastical-feudal culture entered a period of decline, significantly affecting historiography. The number of educated scribes diminished, the quality of Latin writing deteriorated, and knowledge of classical culture became increasingly rare. O. L. Weinstein identified only four notable historians from the entire tenth century: Flodoard and Richer in France, Widukind of Corvey in Saxony, and Liutprand in Italy. At this time, the episcopal see of Reims served as France's leading intellectual center, while royal courts retained this function in Germany and Italy. Richer, a student of Herbert, abbot of Saint-Remi in Reims, authored four books of history covering 884–998. He is notable as an early representative of French national historiography, sometimes called "the first French nationalist." However, political allegiance was then defined not by national identity but by loyalty to either the Carolingians or the Ottonians. Richer, descended from direct Carolingian vassals, favored the Carolingian cause. A skilled classicist, he emulated Sallust, employed elaborate rhetorical techniques, and inserted fictional speeches into his narrative. He also had a keen interest in medicine, often describing the illnesses and deaths of political figures in vivid, naturalistic detail.

Liutprand of Cremona, educated in Pavia and fluent in Greek and Latin—a rare accomplishment—served as a diplomat under Kings Hugh of Provence and Berengar II. After a failed embassy to Constantinople (949–950), he joined the court of Otto I and composed several historical works, including the History of Otto. His writings are highly personal and subjective, often approaching memoir. As one of the few medieval authors to embrace the classical historian's role as an eyewitness, he expressed strong loyalties: a Lombard and Germanic patriot, he favored Goths, Franks, Vandals, and Lombards over Romans and Greeks, and held open contempt for Bulgarians, Magyars, and Slavs. Appointed Bishop of Cremona, he defended imperial authority in Church affairs while sharply criticizing Byzantine opposition to the papacy. His accounts include detailed, often scandalous descriptions of the Roman Church during the so-called "pornocracy," particularly the papacy of John XII.

Widukind of Corvey, in contrast, remained in his Saxon monastery throughout his life. Though a monk, his writings were secular in focus, with special attention to the Saxon wars against the Slavs (Lutici), whom he did not portray with hostility. In chronicling the Saxon dynasty, he asserted that God had assigned the kings three tasks: to glorify their people, expand the realm, and secure peace—understood as the subjugation of neighboring tribes. His biographies of Henry I and Otto the Great were modeled on Einhard's Life of Charlemagne, while accounts of rebellion drew on Sallust's Conspiracy of Catiline. Otto's speech before the Battle of Lechfeld in 955 closely follows Sallust's version of Catiline's address. Among contemporaries and successors, Hrotsvitha of Gandersheim stands out with her poetic hagiography of Otto, in which she stated that “the description of wars is left to men.” Later, Bishop Thietmar of Merseburg compiled a vast chronicle centered on the reign of Henry II. Though traces of Carolingian influence remain in his work, the classical ideals of style and structure had largely faded. By the end of the tenth century, the cultural achievements of the Carolingian Renaissance had been definitively eclipsed.

== High Middle Ages (1000—1300) ==
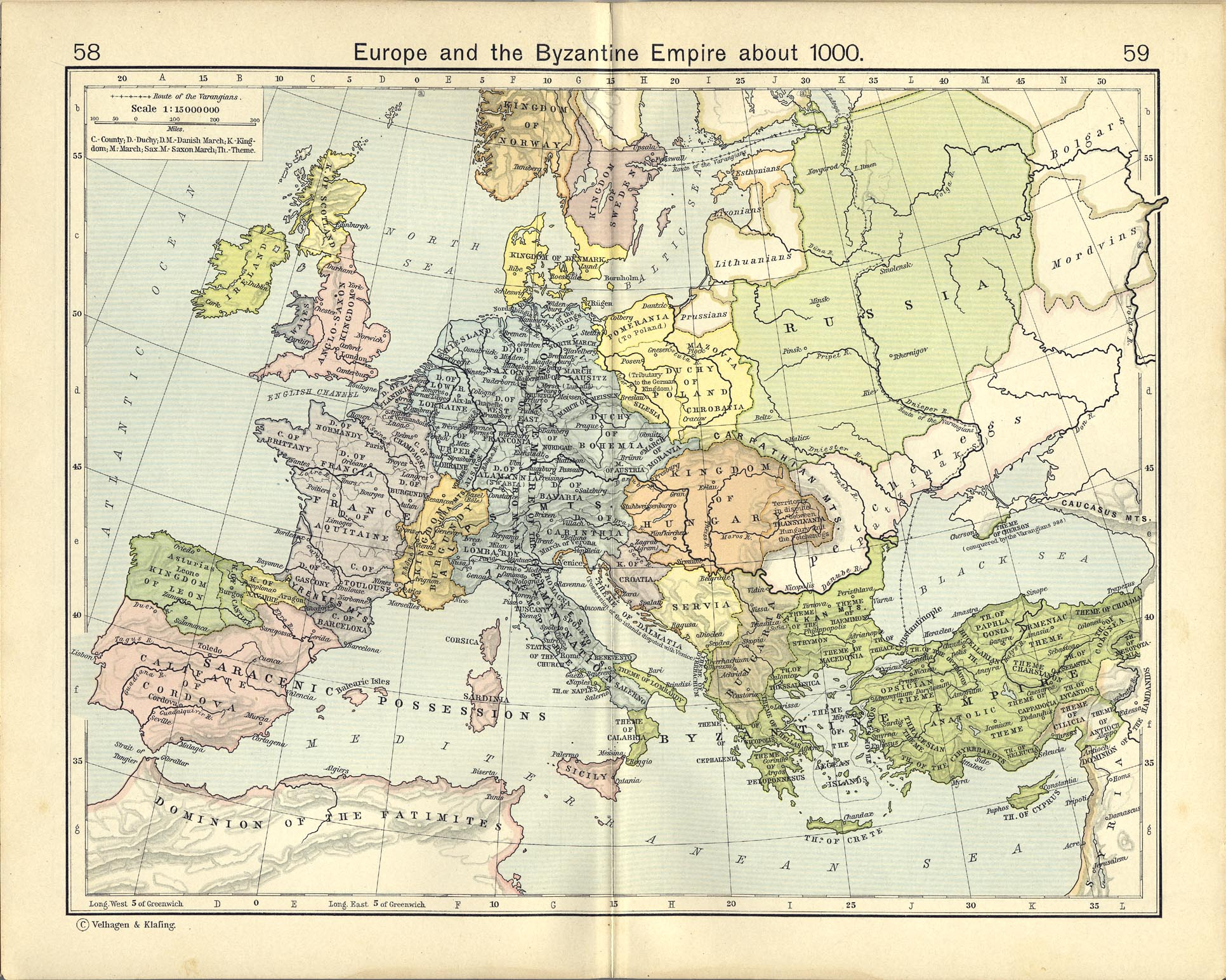
Europe in 1000. Map from: Shepherd, William R.: Historical Atlas. New York: Henry Holt and Company, 1923

According to O. Weinstein, European historiography entered a period of decline after the 840s, lasting until approximately 1075. Chronicles continued to be written, but were often characterized by incoherent content and obscure Latin, sometimes rendering passages incomprehensible. Radulf Glaber's Chronicle exemplifies this trend. Adémar of Chabannes’ Chronicle of Aquitaine was largely derivative, relying heavily on the Chronicle of the Frankish Kings and the Annales laureshamenses, while its original material was provincial in scope, though rich in unique detail. Dudo of Saint-Quentin's work lacked written sources and was composed in a mix of prose and verse, its Latin so poor as to be nearly unreadable. This literary decline was especially pronounced in Germany and Italy. The Quedlinburg Annals, (c. 1025) are noted for their barbarous Latin. The Chronicle of Benedict of St. Andrew's Monastery in Italy was so linguistically poor that its editor, L. Baldeschi, referred to it as a “monstrosity.” By contrast, England preserved a higher historiographical standard in the Anglo-Saxon Chronicle, the oldest extant historical narrative written in a living vernacular European language.

=== Renaissance of the 12th century and universal history ===
By the mid-11th century, Europe entered a transformative phase often referred to as the "feudal revolution", which laid the groundwork for the economic and cultural expansion of the 12th century. The Crusades accelerated these changes by ending the Latin West's cultural isolation and fostering contact with the Byzantine and Islamic worlds. This reawakening included renewed interest in Plato and Aristotle, available through Arabic translations and increasingly in the Greek original. This revival helped initiate the rise of scholastic philosophy, pioneered by figures such as Roscelinus, Peter Abelard, William of Conches, and Gilbert de la Porrée. Interest in classical Latin literature also revived, with the cathedral schools of Chartres and Orléans playing key roles. As Hans Liebeschütz observed, classical antiquity was valued primarily as a repository of useful ideas and forms, rather than as an object of study in itself. The study of Roman law flourished in Bologna, where the first university emerged, and Italy also saw the rise of secular schools. By the late 12th century, universities had been established in Paris, Oxford, and Cambridge. While ancient historians attracted less attention than during the Carolingian period, references to Sallust, Suetonius, Livy, Caesar, and even Tacitus (whose surviving manuscripts largely date to the 11th–12th centuries) reappeared. The volume of historical writing increased significantly. According to the Patrologia Latina compiled by Abbot Migne, of the 217 volumes covering Latin Church Fathers from the 2nd to the 12th century, eight belong to the 10th century, twelve to the 11th, and forty to the 12th—more than any other period. Five times as many historical works were produced in the 12th century as in the 11th. Most of these were chronicles—both local and universal—organized around events from the creation of the world. Universal chronicles typically structured events by papal or imperial reigns, but increasingly included geographical and biographical divisions. These works often had eschatological conclusions, encouraging some authors to develop philosophical reflections on history.

==== Otto of Freising and the Translatio imperii ====
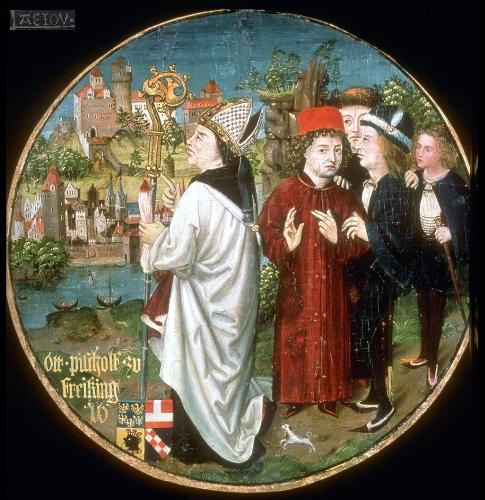
Bishop Otto looking at the cathedral and the city of Freising from the east bank of the Isar River (panel Family Tree of the Babenbergs), between 1489 and 1492

Among 12th-century chroniclers, Otto of Freising stands out. His principal work, On the Two States (De duabus civitatibus), reflects a return to Augustinian historiography, contrasting the City of God with the Earthly City. In a letter to Emperor Frederick Barbarossa, Otto referred to the work as The Book of the Variability of Fortunes, dividing it into eight books: the first seven recount human suffering from Adam onward, and the eighth deals with eschatology—the coming of the Antichrist, the end of the world, and the eternal bliss of the righteous. Less philosophically rigorous than Augustine, Otto wrote with a moral purpose: to exhort readers to renounce earthly pleasures and prepare for divine judgment.

Otto applied Augustine's dichotomy to contemporary institutions, presenting the Apostolic See as the representative of the City of God and the Holy Roman Empire as a temporal counterpart. He made no sharp distinction between the ancient Roman Empire and the Holy Roman Empire, viewing them as historically continuous. He treated barbarian invasions and new kingdoms as comparable to internal Roman rebellions, acknowledging a break in imperial continuity between 476 and 800, which he resolved through the theory of translatio imperii—the transfer of imperial authority. In Book 7, Otto presented a continuous list of Roman rulers and popes, beginning with mythic kings like Janus, Saturn, progressing to Augustus, and culminating in the transfer of the empire from East to West under Pepin the Short. While recognizing that the empire was Roman "in name only," he nonetheless upheld its legitimacy. Otto believed that the temporal power of the empire extended only outside Rome; within the city, the Pope ruled by virtue of the Donation of Constantine. AFor Otto, the true first translatio occurred with the founding of Constantinople. A central moment in his narrative was the papal anointing of Pepin, which legitimized the papal authority to crown or depose kings—a theme Otto developed further in his treatment of the Canossa episode. Otto anticipated the decline of the empire, identifying the fall of the Roman Empire with the approach of the Last Judgment. The earthly kingdom and the world itself, in his view, were nearing their end, to be followed by the eternal Kingdom of God.

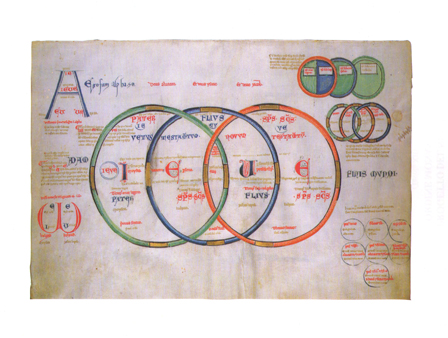
Trinitarian circles. Image from Liber Figurarum. Library of Corpus Christi College (Oxford). Ms. 255А. Fol. 7v

==== Joachim of Fiore's Hiliasism ====
Joachim of Fiore was not a historian but developed his doctrine in theological works such as The Concordance of the Old and New Testaments, Commentary on the Revelation of John, and The Ten String Psalter. His teachings later influenced the Apostolic Brethren, including Segarelli and Dolcino, and had some impact on Reformation leaders.

Joachim's theology was a vision of history shaped by divine design, intended to reveal the nature of the Trinity. Though the Trinity is one God, each Person acts distinctly in history, which Joachim divided into three successive epochs: the Age of the Father, the Age of the Son, and the Age of the Holy Spirit. History, in his view, progressed toward spiritual perfection under the guidance of each divine Person. A follower visualized this doctrine in the Book of Figures using three interlinked circles representing the Trinity. Their intersection signifies both divine unity and the continuity of historical ages. Each age is marked by a theological virtue: green (hope) for the Father, blue (faith) for the Son, and red (love) for the Holy Spirit. The center of the Son's circle marks the boundary between the Old and New Testaments, with Christ as both the awaited and revealed Messiah. Joachim calculated that the transition from the Age of the Son to the Age of the Holy Spirit would occur in 1260. He divided history into three sets of 21 generations: from Adam to Abraham, Abraham to Uzziah, and Uzziah to Christ. Some groups interpreted this date as the end of the institutional Church. Joachim himself believed he lived during the sixth seal of the Apocalypse and that the Antichrist would appear after 1200. He identified seven Antichrist kings—past, present, and future—including Herod, Nero, Muhammad, and Saladin.

=== The emergence of national historiographies ===
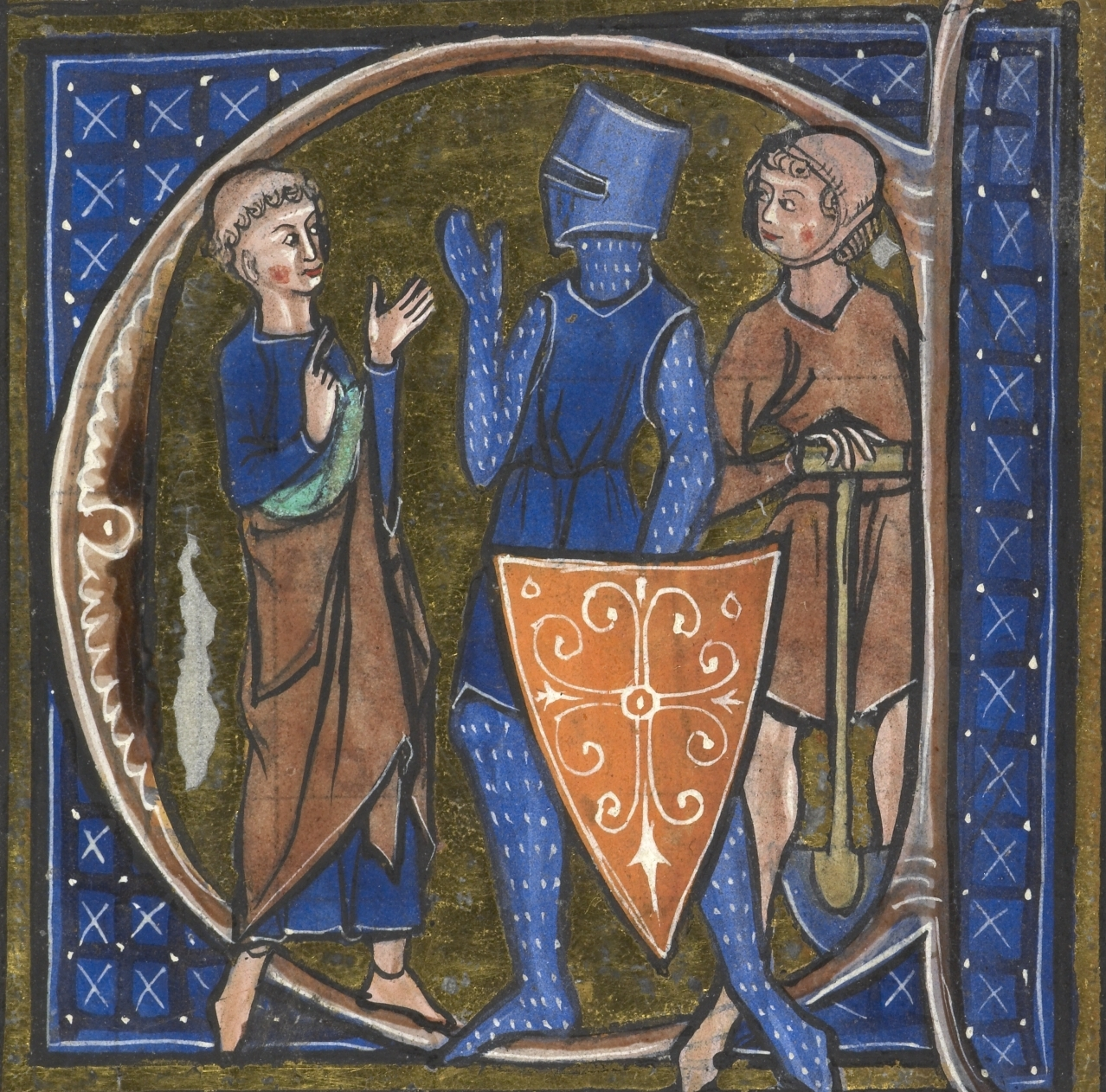
Representatives of the three estates. Initial from the thirteenth-century manuscript Li Livres dou Santé (MS Sloane 2435, folio 85). British Library

According to Norbert Kersken, the development of national historiographies began in the late 12th century and, in its characteristic form, continued until the early 16th century. This process unfolded in four main phases:

1. Second half of the 12th century;
2. 13th century (ca. 1200–1275);
3. 14th century;
4. Second half of the 15th century.

The emergence of national historiographies occurred concurrently across several European regions with classical roots and medieval traditions shaped by the migration period—most notably in France, England, and Spain. Key catalysts included major conquests: the Crusades for France, the Norman Conquest for England, and the Reconquista for Spain. France, often considered the medieval epicenter of feudalism, was especially active, with intellectual centers like Fleury Abbey and Saint-Denis. Hugh of Fleury's Historia modernorum (c. 1118–1135) chronicled the Western Frankish state, while the Gesta gentis Francorum, produced at Saint-Denis by Abbot Suger, laid the foundation for French national historiography. A parallel tradition of universal chronicles also developed, such as Sigebert of Gembloux's Chronographia, which extended Jerome's historical model. Sigebert also authored Liber de scriptoribus ecclesiasticis, listing 174 works including his own. His influence was profound, with 25 later chronicles styled as continuations of his Chronographia. Other notable contributions came from Honorius Augustodunensis and Orderic Vitalis, whose Ecclesiastical History blended Norman identity with universal Christian history.

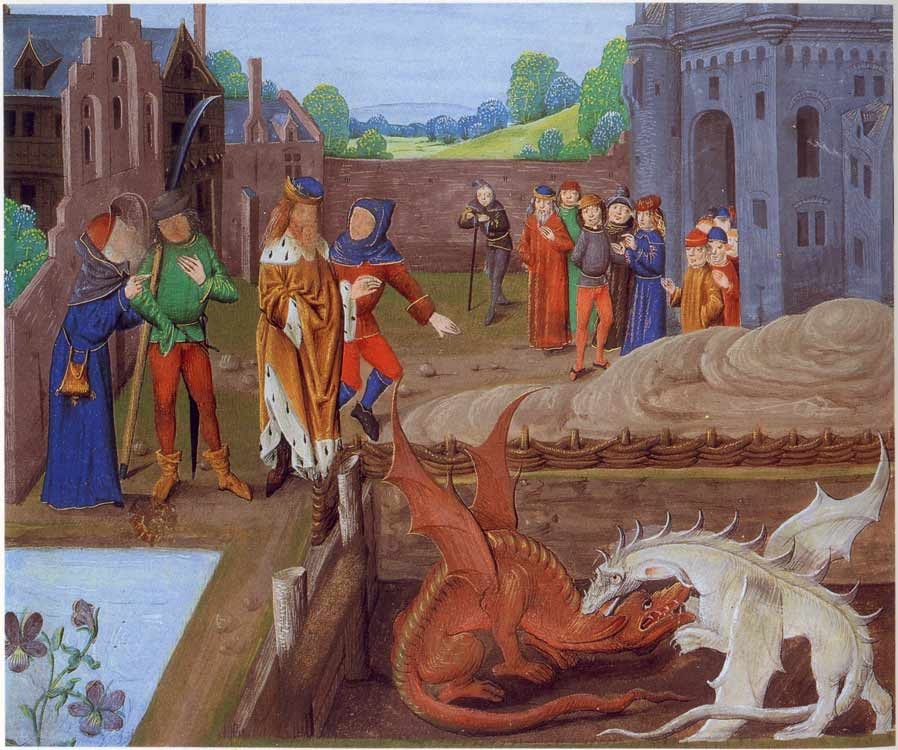
Vortigern and Ambrose watching the battle of the dragons. 15th-century miniature from the Historia Regum Britanniae manuscript

In England, national historiography evolved with distinct features. John of Worcester synthesized Marianus Scotus of Mainz's Universal Chronicle with the Anglo-Saxon Chronicle, continuing Bede's tradition of embedding national history within a universal Christian context. William of Malmesbury, working under royal patronage, wrote the Gesta Regum Anglorum and Gesta Pontificum Anglorum, breaking from simple chronicle form by thematically organizing English history. Henry of Huntingdon’s Historia Anglorum reflected a theological interpretation of national history, emphasizing divine punishment through foreign invasions. He also revived the Brutus legend, later popularized by Geoffrey of Monmouth in his Historia Regum Britanniae.

In Spain, national historiography began with Bishop Pelayo of Oviedo's Corpus Pelagianum, which continued Isidore of Seville’s History of the Goths and sought to establish continuity between the Visigothic kingdom and Castile. The Crónica Najerense, composed in la Rioja in the mid-12th century, extended this tradition.

In the Germanic world, historiography was shaped by two forces: the conflict between the imperial authorities and the Pope, and eastern expansion into Slavic and Baltic lands. Western chroniclers like Lambert of Hersfeld, Frutolf of Michelsberg, Ekkehard of Aura, and Otto of Freising focused on imperial-papal conflicts, while eastern chroniclers such as Adam of Bremen and Arnold of Lübeck documented the expansion eastward. According to R. Sprandel, this dual focus produced both papal and imperial chronicle traditions, characterized by continuity and the accumulation of narratives over time. Some chroniclers extended universal chronicles with local material (e.g., Andreas of Regensburg), while others expanded local chronicles into broader universal narratives (e.g., Johannes of Rothe, Konrad Stoll). Fritzsche Klosener’s Strasbourg Chronicle, although unpublished until the 19th century, represents the mature medieval chronicle form, synthesizing multiple sources and continuing the Latin Saxon Chronicle in vernacular German.

Among Slavic peoples, national historiography emerged with major works such as Chronica Boemorum by Cosmas of Prague, the Primary Chronicle by Nestor the Chronicler, and the Gesta principum Polonorum by Gallus Anonymus, foundational texts for Bohemian, Kievan Rus’, and Polish historical tradition.

=== The historiography of the 13th century ===
==== National traditions development ====
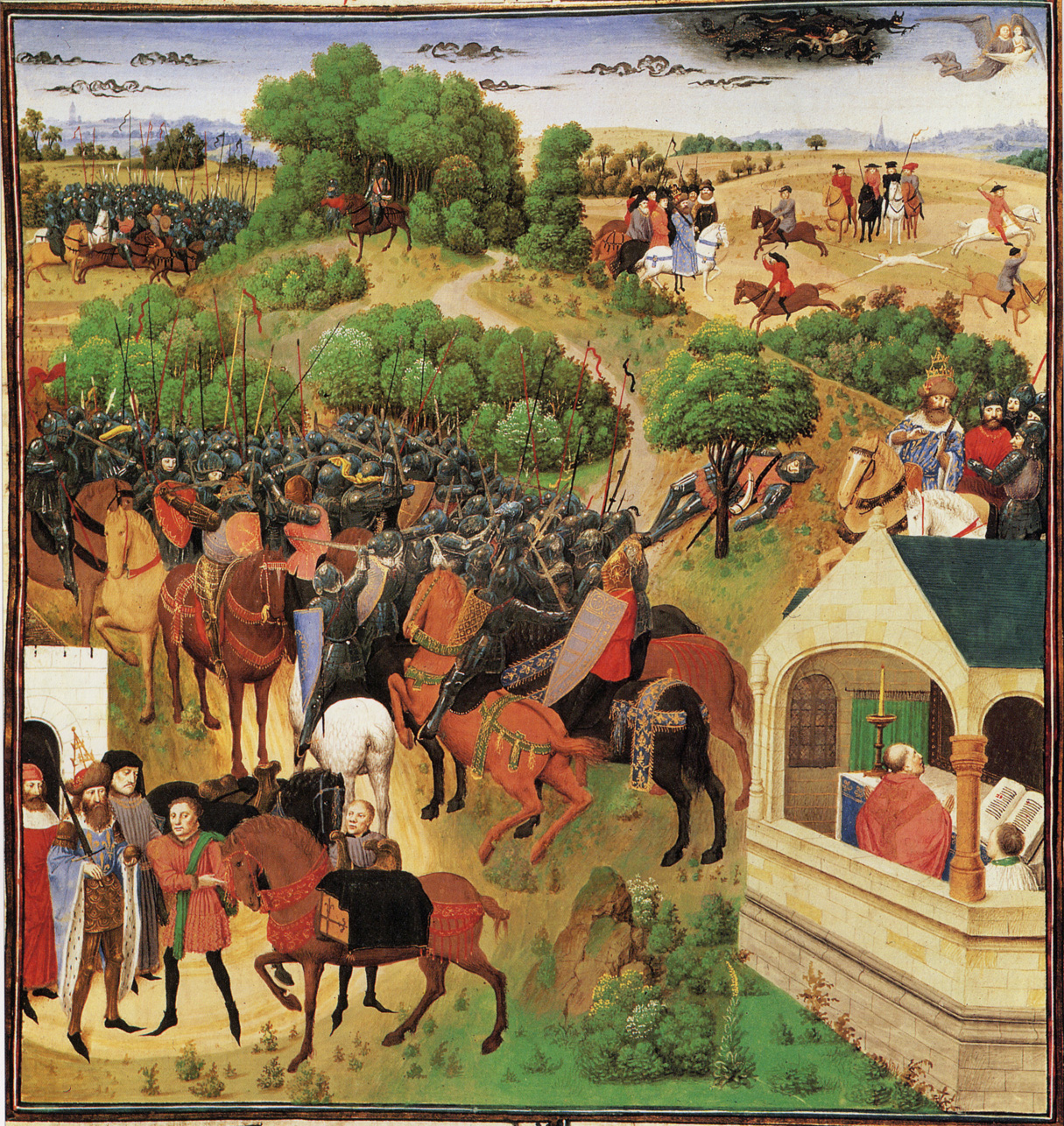
Roland's campaign. Miniature from the Great Chronicles of France. State Hermitage Museum

According to R. Sprandel, national historiography in the 13th century experienced two major periods of growth: around 1200 and after 1275. In France, the most notable historical work was Speculum historiale (Historical Mirror) by Vincent of Beauvais, part of his vast encyclopedia Speculum maius (Great Mirror), which also included sections on natural history and theology. Described by O. Weinstein as a compilation of a highly erudite and industrious monk, the work is remarkable for its scale—estimated at over 1.2 million words. Vincent, serving as court reader to King Louis IX, had access to the royal library and compiled material from hundreds of manuscripts with the help of a team of editors. Following Helinand's example, Vincent systematically cited sources, establishing a method of quotation separation that prefigured the scholarly footnotes and endnotes of Renaissance humanism. The Speculum historiale was later translated into French, Catalan, and Flemish, widely copied, and illustrated. The Basilica of Saint-Denis functioned as a key center of French historiography. In 1274, the monk Primat presented a French translation of Latin chronicles to King Philip III. This formed the basis of the Grandes Chroniques de France, expanded until the 15th century. Among its contributors was Guillaume de Nangis, who drew on Vincent's Mirror. Written in the vernacular, the Grandes Chroniques made national history accessible to a broader educated audience and significantly influenced French historical consciousness.

In England, the Abbey of St. Albans played a parallel role. English historiography retained universalist tendencies, unlike the more nationalized French model. Gervase of Canterbury's Gesta Regum Britanniae traced English kingship from the legendary Brutus to 1210. Ralph de Diceto's Ymagines historiarum focused instead on the history of Anjou and Normandy. Roger of Wendover's Flores Historiarum, revised by his disciple Matthew Paris into the Chronica Majora, offered a detailed narrative of English history within a universal framework. Matthew also compiled condensed versions—Historia Anglorum and Abbreviatio chronicorum Angliae—focused on the Norman period (1067–1255). The Flores began with the Creation, reflecting the enduring universal chronicle tradition.

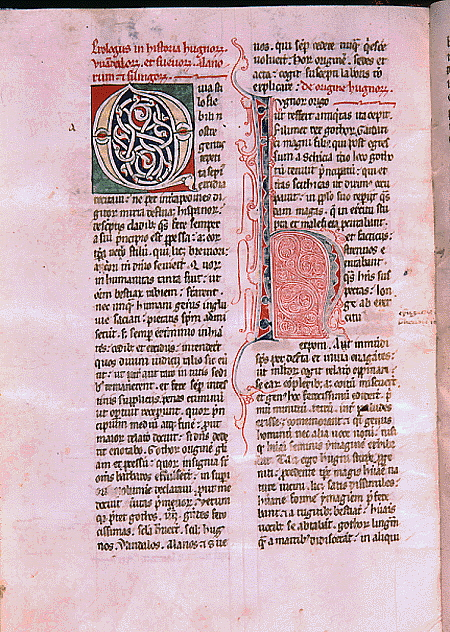
Page from the 13th-century manuscript De rebus Hispaniae

In Castile, the political rise under Ferdinand III spurred the development of national historiography. Bishop Lucas of Tuy authored Chronicon mundi (1236–1239) at Queen Berenguela's request, continuing Isidore of Seville's tradition and culminating in the conquest of Córdoba. Archbishop Rodrigo Jiménez de Rada, a key figure, aimed to create a unified Spanish historical narrative. His Historia Gothica (Historia de rebus Hispanie), dedicated to Ferdinand, integrated Roman, Gothic, and Islamic histories into a cohesive Spanish identity. This inclusive vision shaped later developments under Alfonso X the Wise, whose court produced the Primera Crónica General. Written in Castilian, it marked a departure from Latin and organized history by the succession of dominant peoples (Greeks, Carthaginians, Romans, Germanic tribes, Visigoths). A second book began with Pelayo of Asturias and the Reconquista. The chronicle was revised and expanded until the late 15th century.

In Germany, the collapse of the Hohenstaufen dynasty fragmented historical writing. Latin chronicles remained local and monastic, while vernacular works in regional dialects anticipated a new genre—urban bourgeois historiography—though these had limited broader influence. In Italy, where the chronicle genre had declined, city chronicles became dominant from the 13th century onward, often centered on the Guelphs-Ghibelline conflict. A key example is Liber Chronicorum by Rolandino of Padua, focusing on the tyranny of Ezzelino III da Romano in Treviso. Rolandino idealized Padua as a second Rome, flourishing in freedom until subjected to despotism. His work was publicly read and acclaimed in 1262. Many Italian chronicles incorporated mythological origins. Martino da Canale's Venetian chronicle (1275), written in French, traced Venice's founding to Trojan refugees and was likely intended for international audiences. The first Florentine chronicle (to 1231) was written by an anonymous judge. Tolomeo of Lucca, a student of Thomas Aquinas, attempted a Tuscan-wide chronicle for 1080–1278 but left it unfinished. An exception to the local focus was the Franciscan monk Salimbene of Parma, whose Chronica expressed early pan-Italian patriotism and opposed German imperial authority.

==== Order's Historiography ====
The historiography of the Franciscan and Dominican Orders began to develop in the 13th century. From the foundation of the Franciscan Order, a substantial body of primarily hagiographical literature emerged, focusing on the life of St. Francis and his early followers. In addition to these biographies, the Franciscans produced broader historical works, the most notable being Flores Temporum ("Flowers of Time"), attributed to Martin Minorite or Herman of Genoa. Intended as a resource for Franciscan preachers, this chronicle was structured around the succession of popes and German emperors, with references to saints' lives. Despite limited circulation, it influenced early historiography before being supplanted by a more widely adopted Dominican work. That work was the Chronicon pontificum et imperatorum ("Chronicle of Popes and Emperors") by Martin of Opava, which became a standard reference for jurists, theologians, and inquisitors. It marked the beginning of the chronica martiniana subgenre. The chronicle, organized by papal and imperial successions, compiled extensive material from earlier sources. It was repeatedly copied, expanded, and translated into Czech, German, French, and Italian, remaining in circulation into the 17th century. In the 14th century, Dominican historiography was exemplified by Bernard Gui, a prominent inquisitor. His main work, Flores chronicorum (completed in 1331), followed Martin of Opava's structure but demonstrated more critical engagement with sources, aided by Gui's investigative experience and access to official documents. He also authored local histories of Dominican abbeys in French. B. Ullmann regarded Bernard Gui as a precursor to Italian humanism for his methodological rigor, and Molyneux praised him as a “historian of the first rank” for the accuracy and breadth of his information.

==== Historical writings in new European languages ====
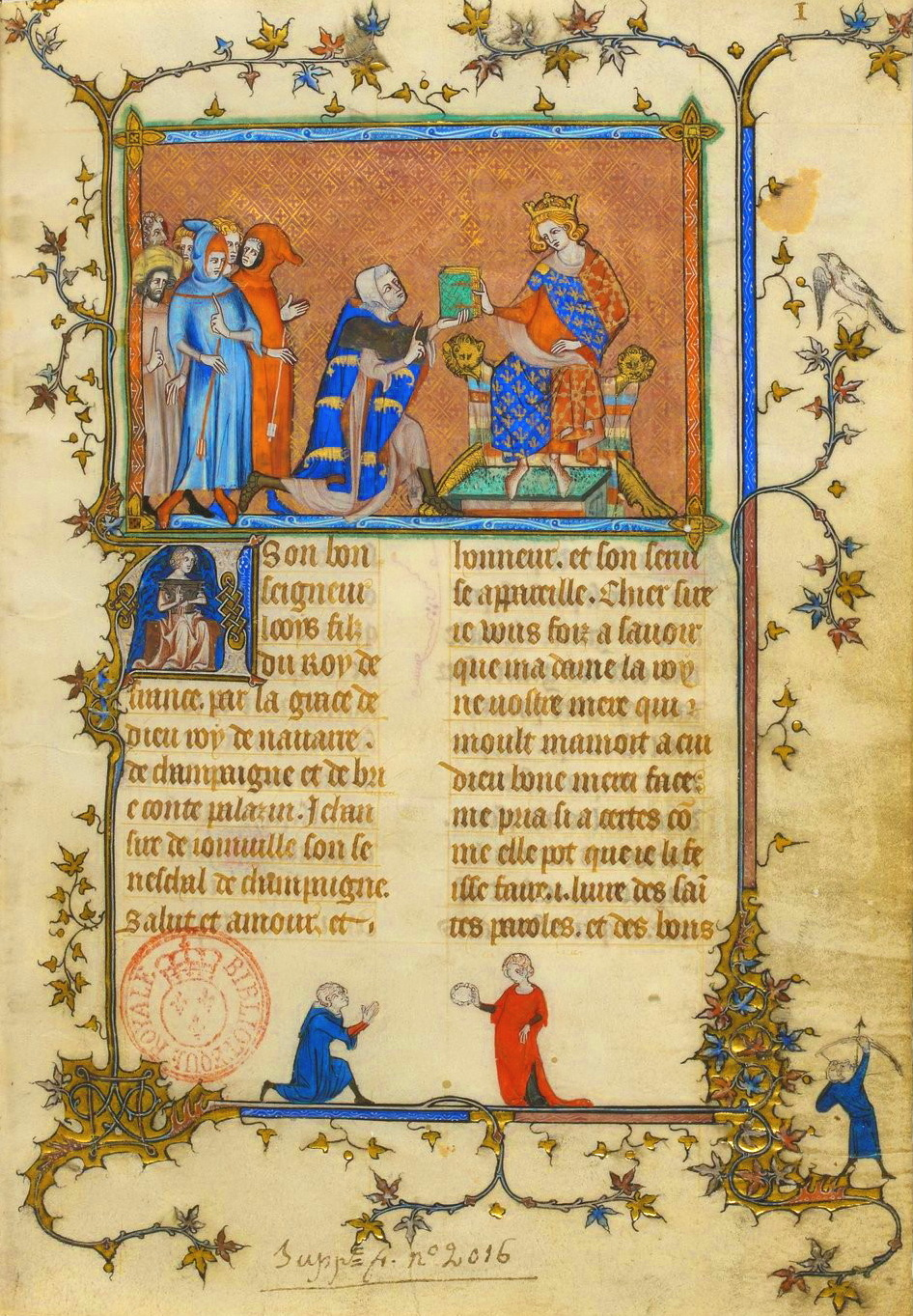
Title page of the Brussels manuscript of Joinville. 1330s-1340s. Bibliothèque nationale de France, manuscrits français 13568, fol. 1

A defining feature of 13th-century historiography was the emergence of historical writing in vernacular languages. This shift expanded the readership beyond the clergy and classically educated nobility, making historical narratives accessible to the broader population. As a result, authors increasingly considered the entertainment value of their works, leading to the inclusion of legends, fables, and anecdotes. This change also encouraged the growth of ethno-geographical literature, which began to appear alongside traditional chronicles. Unlike earlier periods, which relied heavily on classical sources, these new accounts often drew from contemporary pilgrim reports and travel narratives—such as those of John of Plano Carpini, Rubruk, Aszelin, Simon St. Cantensky, Marco Polo, and William of Tripoli. According to I. V. Dubrovsky, historiography during this period became “a sphere of social and cultural reconciliation and national integration.” A new scholarly attitude toward history also emerged, in which the past was valued in its own right, and historical writing became more differentiated and personalized.

A notable development was the rise of verse chronicles composed in the vernacular. While some authors were noble trouvères, others came from the third estate—jugglers, minstrels, and itinerant performers. Although earlier theologians like Otto of Freising had disparaged minstrels, Thomas Aquinas later affirmed their legitimacy, especially when they praised rulers and saints or offered comfort through their songs. This genre flourished in France. One prominent example is the Rhymed Chronicle of Philippe Mousket, a bourgeois from Tournai, comprising 31,000 verses covering French history up to 1241. In the 14th century, Guillaume Guiart, an itinerant minstrel and eyewitness to the Flemish campaigns, composed a similarly lengthy poem extolling French kings from Philip-Augustus to Philip the Fair. Another major work was the Song of the Albigensian Crusade, written in Provençal language. Rhymed chronicles also appeared in German-speaking regions. The Cologne Rhymed Chronicle, commissioned by the city's Small Council and authored by city scribe Gottfried Hagen, functioned as a political defense of the patriciate against both the archbishop and the guilds. The Austrian Chronicle by Ottokar of Styria, composed between 1280 and 1295, is one of the largest vernacular works of the period, spanning 650 chapters and 83,000 verses. It recounts European events through both oral testimony and the author's personal experiences. In England and Italy, authors who avoided Latin often chose to write in French. Brunetto Latini, Dante Alighieri's teacher, composed Li Livres dou Trésor (Book of Treasures) in French, calling it “more agreeable and intelligible.” Dante and the Venetian chronicler Martino da Canale shared this view. The London Chronicle, covering 1259–1343, was also written in French.

Memoirs emerged as a distinct historical genre in the vernacular, especially in France. Sparked by the events of the Fourth Crusade, the earliest example is The Conquest of Constantinople by Geoffrey of Villehardouinn, Marshal of Champagne and one of the crusade's leaders. Other works in this tradition include Overseas Stories by Ernoul and History of the Conquest of Constantinople by Robert de Clari, a Picard knight. Jean de Joinville's memoirs, stemming from his participation in Louis IX's crusade (1248–1254), also belong to this genre. His work later expanded into The Book of the Holy Words and Good Deeds of Saint Louis, incorporating and reworking content from the Grandes Chroniques de France.

== Late Middle Ages (1300—1500) ==
=== National historiographies of the 14th century ===
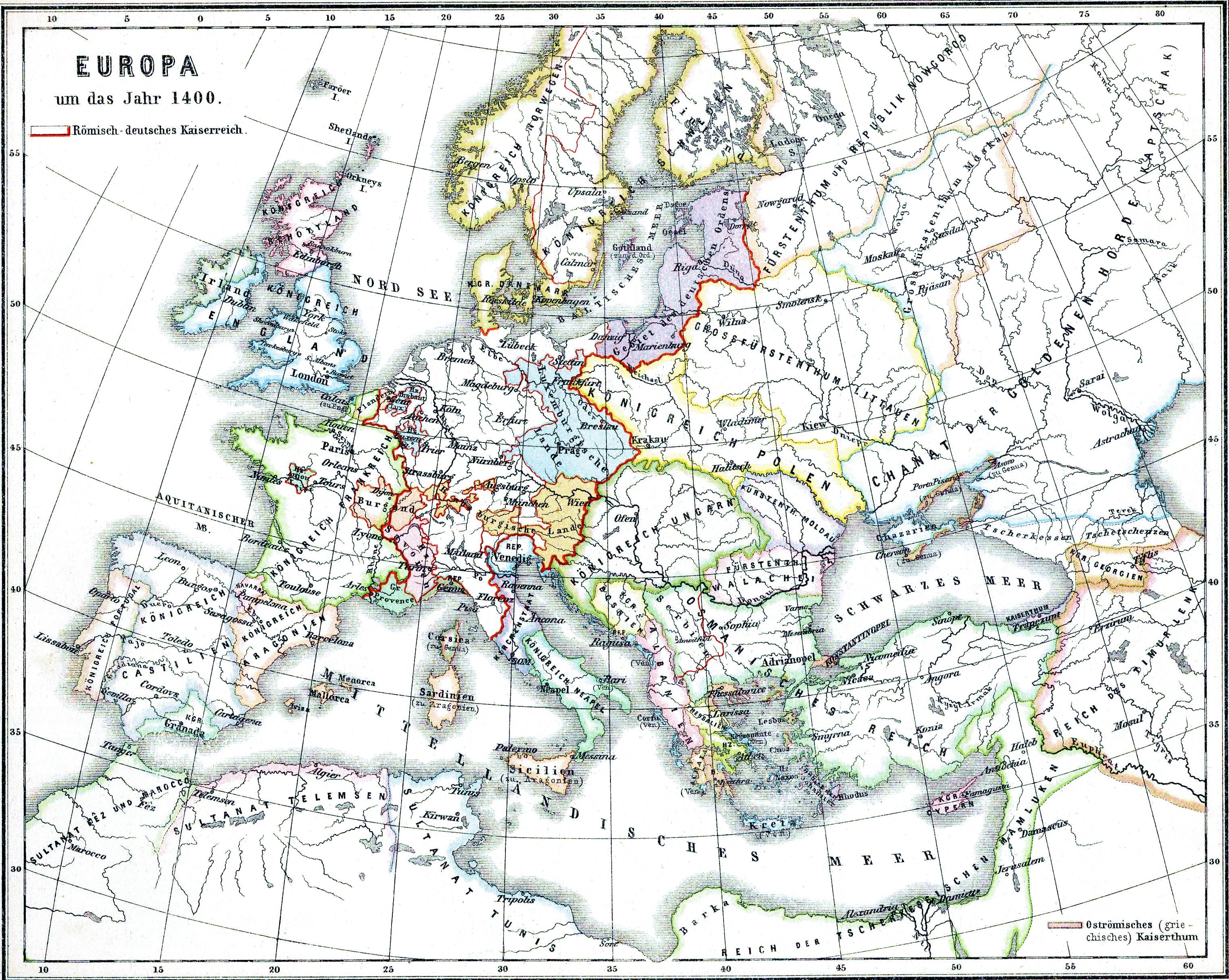
Map of the states of Europe for the year 1400 from H.Kieperts Historischer Schulatlas, 1879

The 14th century was a period of prolonged crisis across Europe, marked by the Hundred Years' War in France, England, and Flanders, and the devastating impact of the Black Death (1348–1350), which returned in later years. The authority of the Catholic Church weakened significantly during the Avignon Papacy, contributing to the rise of various heresies. According to Norbert Kersken, this era brought little innovation in historiography; rather, it was characterized by the consolidation and continuation of 13th-century traditions. A notable development, however, was the emergence of an independent historiographical tradition in Scotland.

In France, the historiographical center remained the Abbey of Saint-Denis, where the Grandes Chroniques de France were continued into the 15th century under Charles VII. The Chronicle became an official royal narrative under Charles V, when Chancellor Pierre d’Augermont assumed editorial responsibility. From that point, the text was composed in French and only later translated into Latin, reflecting the growing prominence of the vernacular.

In Germany, historiography became largely localized. Key chronicles include Peter Dusburg's Chronicle of the Teutonic Order (covering 1190–1326), the Carinthian Chronicle by Johann Wicktring, and the Swabian Chronicle by Johann von Winterthur—both victims of the plague. These were later synthesized in the Bavarian Chronicle by Ulrich Onzorge, completed in 1422. A rare universal chronicle was Werner Rolewink's Fasciculus temporum, written in Cologne and widely disseminated after 1474 through numerous editions and translations.

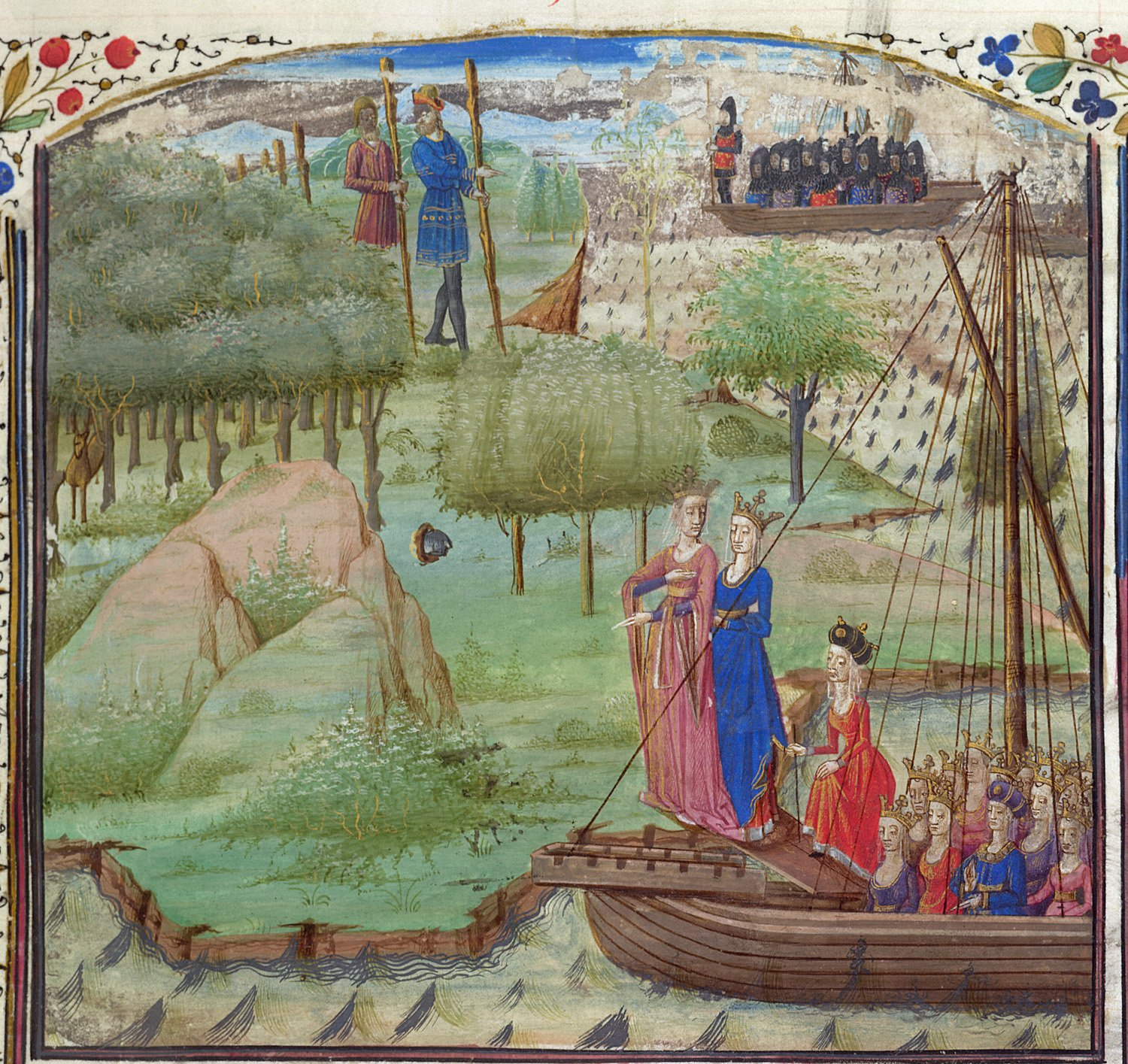
Miniature from the manuscript of Brutus: Brutus of Troy arrives in England, watched by the daughters of Diodysias. BL Royal 19 °C IX, f. 8, British Library

In Spain, two Crónicas Generales (1344 and 1390) followed the tradition of Alfonso X. Alongside these, anonymous works flourished, most notably the Chronicle of San Juan de la Peña, linked to the Aragonese court of Peter IV. Though the original Latin text (1369–1372) is lost, Catalan versions survive. The chronicle presents a legendary history beginning with Antiquity and the Visigoths, tracing the emergence of Aragon from Navarre. A related work, the Navarrese Chronicle, was authored by García de Eugui, bishop of Bayonne. Initially a universal chronicle, it later incorporated Castilian sources and contemporary notes.

In England, the death of Matthew Paris signaled the decline of the St. Albans historiographical tradition, which ceased entirely by 1422. English historiography retained its universal framework, beginning with Brutus of Troy. Latin remained the dominant language, though French was also used. Three Anglo-Norman texts—Brutus, Li Rei de Engleterre, and Le Livere de Reis de Engleterre—span 1270/1272 to 1306, with extensions to 1326. A Middle English verse chronicle, second only to Robert of Gloucester's, recounted events from Brutus to Edward I's death. The rise of vernacular writing corresponded with growing patriotic sentiment during the Hundred Years’ War, expanding historical interest beyond the educated elite. National history came to encompass the entire British Isles, including Wales and Scotland. The Brutus narrative was widely circulated in Middle English, surviving in over 230 manuscripts. In the 1360s, Ranulph Higden, a monk of Chester, compiled the Polychronicon in seven books. He structured English history into three phases—Anglo-Saxon, Danish, and Norman—within a broader sacred and universal historical framework. Notably, Higden emphasized English history over universal concerns, translating even papal reigns into their English counterparts. The Polychronicon became a foundational text of English historiography, translated twice into English and printed by William Caxton.

=== Burgundian School of the 14th–15th centuries ===
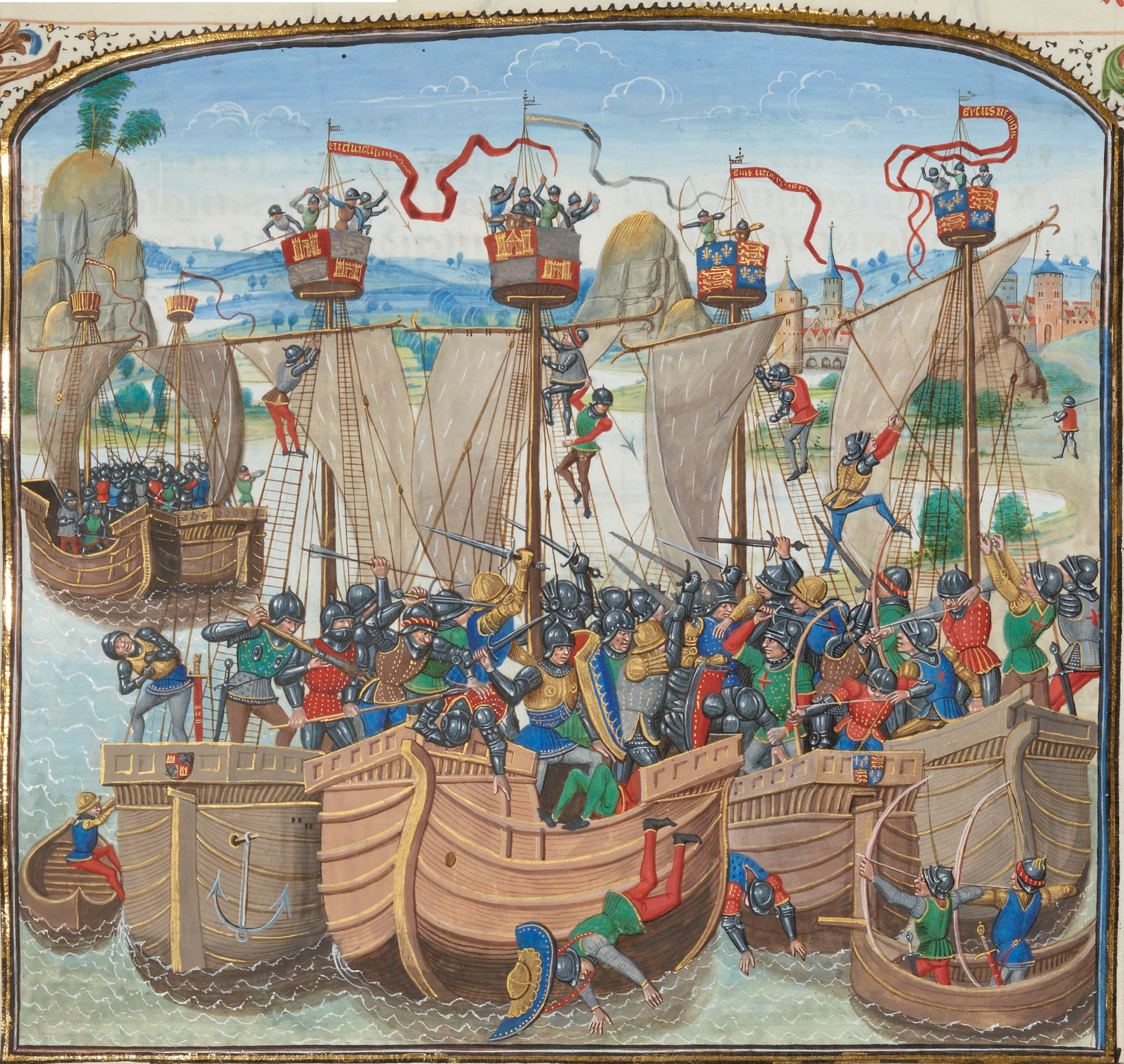
Battle of La Rochelle. Miniature from the manuscript of Froissart Bibliothèque Nationale de France, BNF FR 2643

The "Burgundian School" refers to a group of secular chivalric chroniclers from the territories of the Duchy of Burgundy, particularly Flanders and Artois. At the Burgundian court during the late 14th and early 15th centuries, there was a deliberate cultural revival of chivalric ideals, courtly poetry, and ceremonial life. This intellectual atmosphere fostered a distinct historiographical tradition grounded in the celebration of knighthood and noble valor. A foundational figure of this tradition was Jean Le Bel, canon of Liège, whose True Chronicles marked a turning point in the genre. Writing in French, Le Bel chronicled recent wars and events in France, England, and Flanders from 1326 to 1361, relying on his own experience and the testimony of eyewitnesses. He explicitly opposed the inaccuracies of popular entertainers and strove to present a truthful account, emphasizing battles, feats of arms, and courtly rituals. Despite his pioneering role, Le Bel's work was eventually overshadowed by the more expansive and widely circulated Chronicles of Jean Froissart.

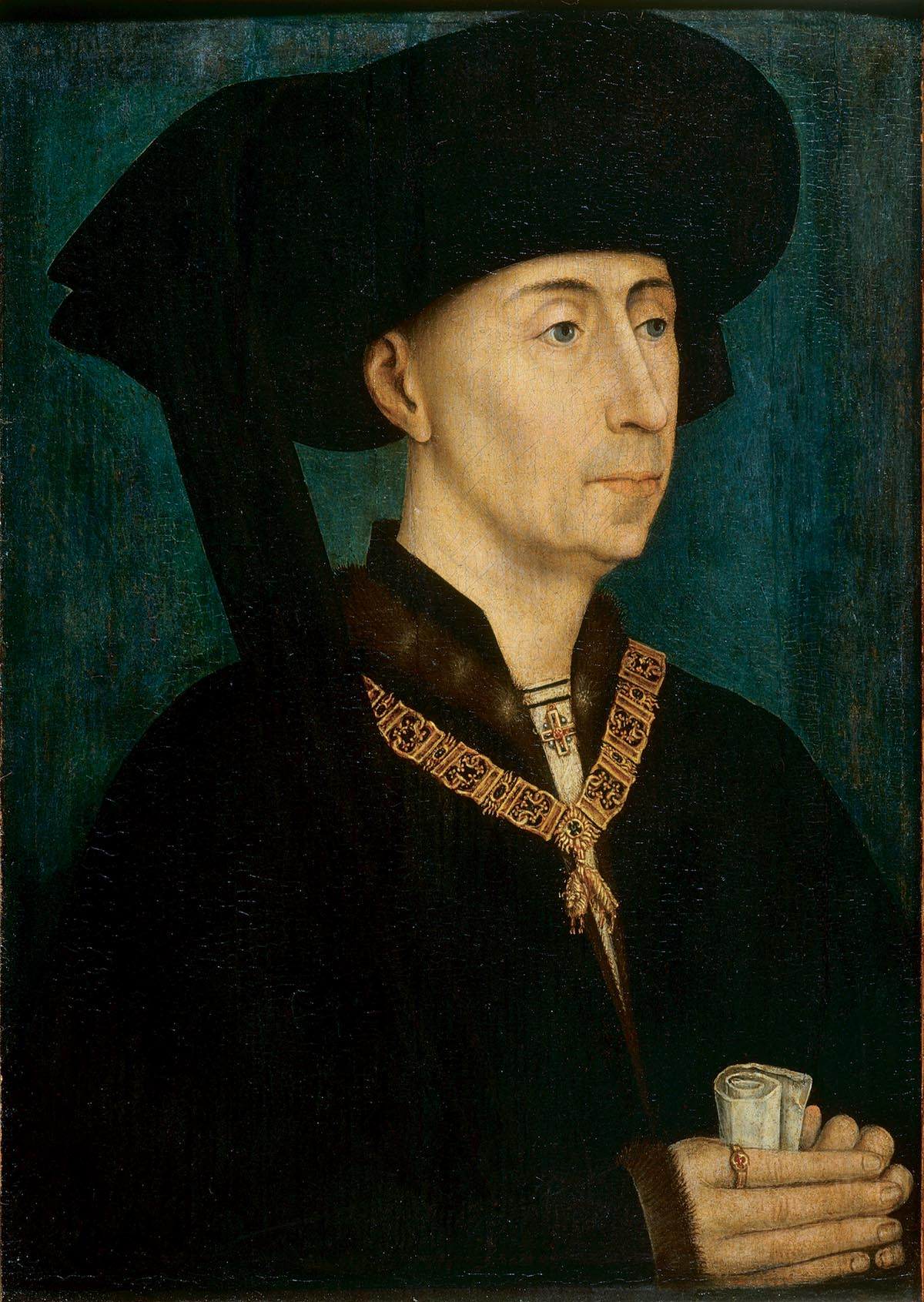
Rogier van der Weyden. Portrait of Duke Philip the Good of Burgundy. About 1450, Musée des Beaux-Arts de Dijon

Froissart, building on Le Bel's foundation, extended his chronicle to the year 1400. He actively sought out news and eyewitnesses, traveling for over four decades among the courts of Europe, where his literary talents were in high demand. His Chronicles exist in three main versions: the first, strongly pro-English (48 manuscripts); the second, revised with a more favorable view of France (2 manuscripts); and the third, composed following English defeats, included praise for French chivalry (surviving in a single manuscript). Froissart's perspective consistently favored the chivalric class, regardless of national affiliation. He held commoners in disdain and characterized various groups with open prejudice: Germans for greed, English for treachery, Scots as thieves, and the Irish as savages. Political loyalties in his work were determined more by allegiance to knightly ideals than by state or nationality. Because of its vivid detail but limited analytical depth, Froissart's Chronicles were long regarded as a primary source rather than as interpretative history. Montaigne described them as a repository of raw material, and Johan Huizinga famously called Froissart's style "journalistic." His writing was admired for its clarity and vividness, though it reduced history to a series of heroic acts and ceremonial events. Froissart recognized heralds and herald-masters as the most reliable witnesses of history, given their expertise in matters of glory and honor. This emphasis aligned with the principles of the Order of the Golden Fleece, which mandated the recording of knightly deeds.

Froissart's chief successor was Enguerrand de Monstrelet, whose chronicle continued the narrative to 1444. His accounts are marked by a florid style and exhaustive descriptions of military campaigns and court events—so much so that his writing became a subject of satire by Rabelais. Monstrelet was present at key historical moments, including the capture of Joan of Arc, and included documents such as a letter from the English king denouncing her as a sorceress and heretic. The most significant Burgundian historian, however, was Georges Chastellain. While he incorporated Monstrelet's chronicle for the period 1419–1444, his later sections were independently written and more analytically ambitious. Chastellain, deeply involved in political affairs, refrained from publishing his work during his lifetime, and surviving manuscripts are incomplete. Although less gifted as a writer than Froissart, Chastellain aspired to identify rational causes behind events. His chronicle, which spans much of Western Europe and resembles a memoir, still reflects a strong chivalric ethos, often describing court ceremonies and tournaments with no clear political rationale. His best-known work, The Mirror of French Chivalry, was widely read. Châtelain's work was the best known. Châtelain's pupil was Jean Lefebvre de Saint-Rémy, Knight of the Golden Fleece and herald of the order. He incorporated Monstrelet's material and enriched it with diplomatic sources. Lefebvre also edited the Chronicle of Jean de Lalaing, a tribute to the ideal of the wandering knight. The death of its protagonist by cannon fire serves as a lament for the passing of traditional chivalry and a condemnation of gunpowder weapons. Chastellain's rival, Olivier de la Marche, was court historian to the Dukes of Burgundy. His Memoirs, covering events up to 1488, focus more on courtly festivities than on statecraft. Also a celebrated poet in the flamboyant style of the time, de la Marche produced anti-French pamphlets and a treatise on the governance of Charles the Bold's realm. The final representative of the Burgundian school was Jean Molinet, court historiographer to Charles the Bold and Philip of Habsburg. Molinet brought Chastellain's chronicle up to 1506, thus carrying the tradition into a new historical era. Historian O. Weinstein criticized Molinet for epitomizing the flaws of the Burgundian style—particularly its excessive use of rhetorical flourish and ornamental language.

=== The emergence of humanist historiography ===
==== The political and rhetorical tradition of Tuscany ====
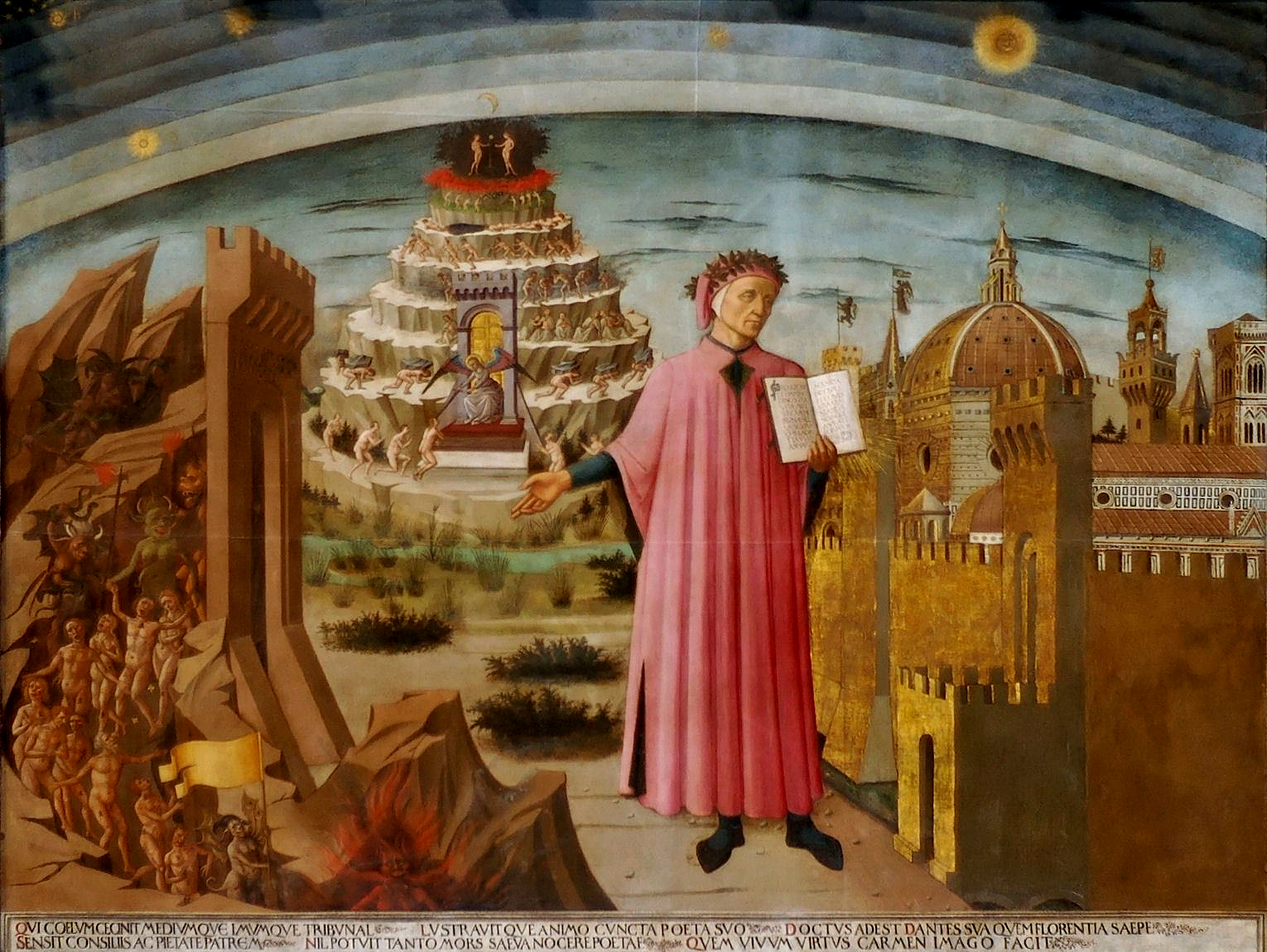
Dante, fresco by Domenico di Michelino 1465, Florence Cathedral

Е. A. Kosminsky dates the emergence of humanist historiography in Tuscany to the 14th century, identifying Petrarch and Boccaccio as its first prominent figures. Their immediate forerunners were the so-called "popular chroniclers"—Albertino Mussato, Dino Compagni, and Dante Alighieri. in his treatise Monarchia, Dante devoted the entire second book to scholastic reasoning based solely on ancient Roman sources. For Dante, the Roman Empire—rather than the medieval Holy Roman Empire—represented the foundation of the ideal polity. Nevertheless, in a typically medieval spirit, he argued that the Empire was a divine miracle and that only God could appoint an emperor over humanity. Dante's political vision was further developed, in varying aspects, by Marsilius of Padua, Petrarch, and Cola di Rienzo. While neither Dante, Petrarch, nor Boccaccio regarded themselves as historians, they each played a crucial role in the formation of a new historical consciousness. Petrarch authored the De viris illustribus ("On Famous Men"), a collection of Latin biographies of twenty-one ancient figures, largely based on Livy but deliberately cleansed of any critical or analytical elements. The work was intended as a moral and cultural contrast between contemporary Italy and its classical past. Boccaccio's contribution came in the form of De claris mulieribus ("On Famous Women"), a treatise composed as a syntagma—a structured compilation of ancient textual fragments on a particular theme.

Leonardo Bruni is widely considered the first true humanist historian. Initially serving as secretary to Pope John XXIII, Bruni settled in Florence after the pope's deposition at the Council of Constance and was later appointed Chancellor of the Florentine Republic in 1427. He began his intellectual career by translating into Latin several classical texts: Plutarch's Life of Cicero, the first two books of Polybius, and Procopius’ Wars with the Goths—the last of which he falsely claimed as his own. His original works include Commentarius rerum suarum ("Commentary on the Events of His Time") and the Historiarum Florentini populi libri XII ("History of the Florentine People in Twelve Books"). Bruni spent 28 years on the History of Florence, which he left unfinished at his death. Its significance lies in Bruni's recognition of the fall of the Roman state as the close of an era, marking the beginning of a distinctly new epoch. In the preface to the History of Florence, Bruni set forth a proto-theoretical framework for the study of history, outlining four primary justifications:

1. To acquire a good style;
2. Considering the Educational Value of History;
3. Because "it is proper for a rational man to know how his native land came into being, how it developed, and what fortunes befell it."
4. The knowledge of history gives the greatest pleasure.

Bruni drew heavily from Giovanni Villani's Chronicle but departed from it by eliminating legendary material and providential interpretations, especially those concerning antiquity. He, and later Guarino da Verona, clearly distinguished between annales—the simple recording of events—and historia—the interpretation of events in the present. Guarino urged the use of Ciceronian principles in historical composition: beginning with intention, proceeding through execution, and concluding with outcomes. He emphasized that beauty of style, clarity of structure, and elegance of expression were essential in lending credibility to historical writing. Bruni's historiographical model was continued by his compatriot Benedetto Accolti, who authored a history of the First Crusade, relying primarily on William of Tyre. Accolti's chronicle would later inspire the plot of Torquato Tasso's Jerusalem Delivered. Another follower, Poggio Bracciolini, completed his own History of Florence in eight books by 1455, which was celebrated for its stylistic excellence. This stylistic standard influenced the Venetian Republic, which commissioned an official history designed to match the literary quality of Bruni and Bracciolini. The task was undertaken by Marcus Antonius Sabellico, a professor of rhetoric, who in 1486 completed the History of Venice from the Founding of the City in 33 books. It was published in Latin in 1487 and translated into Italian the following year. Later, Sabellico composed the Enneades, the first attempt to present universal history from a humanist perspective, consciously rejecting the theological schema of the Four Monarchies.

==== The Roman antiquarian tradition ====
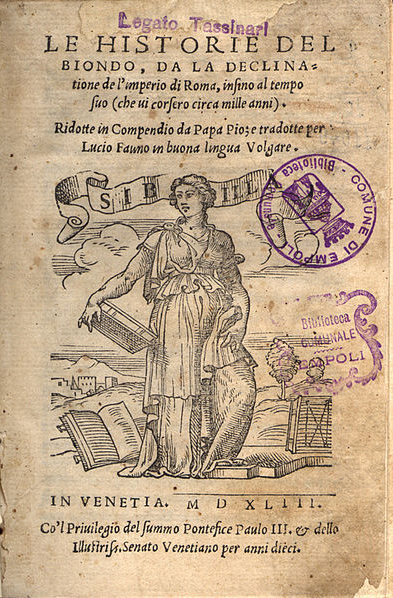
Title page of an Italian edition of Biondo's "Three Decades of Histories from the Fall of the Roman Empire" (1543)

Tuscan humanist historiography may be aptly characterized as political-rhetorical in nature. Its leading representatives often positioned themselves in opposition to the Roman humanist tradition, which laid the groundwork for systematic source criticism and the development of antiquarian scholarship. A key figure in the Roman camp was Flavio Biondo, whose works were not widely esteemed by his contemporaries. His lack of Greek and the perceived deficiency in his Latin style and rhetorical elegance diminished his standing in the eyes of more stylistically oriented humanists. Nevertheless, Biondo's contribution to historiography was foundational. His antiquarian research focused on reconstructing the ancient topography of Rome and the provinces of Italy. His Roma triumphans (1460) was the first systematic treatment of Roman institutions—military, civil, religious, and domestic—as well as Roman customs, dress, and other elements of daily life. According to historian O. Weinstein, Biondo's Historiarum ab inclinatione Romanorum imperii decades (Histories in Three Decades from the Decline of the Roman Empire), spanning the years 412 to 1440, marked a turning point in European historiography. With this work, Biondo became the first European historian to identify and define a historical period resembling what we now consider the Middle Ages. Although Biondo himself did not use the term "Middle Ages," his chronological delineation laid the groundwork for its eventual popularization in the 17th century by Christoph Cellarius. The formal tripartite division of history—ancient, medieval, and modern—was first articulated by Giovanni Andrea Bussi in 1469 in a speech commemorating Nicholas of Cusa. In his explanation of Rome's fall, Biondo remained deeply rooted in the theological worldview of his time. He ascribed the collapse to divine punishment, citing both the persecution of Christians under pagan emperors and the pride of rulers who moved the imperial capital to Constantinople, thus undermining the ancient liberties and civic pride of the Roman people. His historical method remained indebted to medieval compilations, particularly the works of Vincent of Beauvais and Martin of Opava. The Decades was also among the earliest books to be printed in Italy following the advent of movable type. Biondo's antiquarian methodology and critical impulses were further developed by his student, Pomponius Leto, who contributed significantly to the scholarly study of classical antiquity.

Lorenzo Valla, although traditionally celebrated as a classical philologist and the founder of philological criticism, also made significant contributions to historiography. His History of Ferdinand of Aragon included a celebrated demonstration of the falsity of the Donation of Constantine, a text central to papal claims to temporal authority. Although Valla is rarely regarded as a historian in the strict sense, Franco Gaeta has convincingly argued that Valla's philological inquiries were fundamentally historical in nature, in contrast to other humanists who focused primarily on poetry, rhetoric, or philosophy. Julia Smith notes that the principles of rigorous textual criticism established by Valla remained largely unchanged in historical scholarship for the next five centuries. In the preface to his History of Ferdinand, Valla asserted the central importance of history: “From history arises... the knowledge of nature, and the knowledge of human behavior, the greater part of the whole content of science". He was virtually alone among early humanists in attempting to elevate history to the status of a science, insisting that it was the most difficult of all scholarly disciplines. His magnum opus, Elegantiae linguae Latinae (1448), though ostensibly a work of philology, was animated by a historical and cultural agenda: the restoration of Latin to its classical purity was, for Valla, a means of reviving Roman civilization itself. In his view, the Roman Empire may have perished under barbarian invasions, but its culture and language—though corrupted—had survived. Thus, to purify Latin was to revive the very spirit of Rome. Another important figure in early humanist historiography was Aeneas Silvius Piccolomini (later Pope Pius II). After serving for many years in diplomatic and ecclesiastical roles across Switzerland and the German-speaking lands, he became a key figure in the reform of German historiography. His works, including descriptions of Basel and historical accounts of Austria and Bohemia, served as foundational texts for the German humanist historians of the 16th century.

=== National historiographies in the 15th century and humanism ===
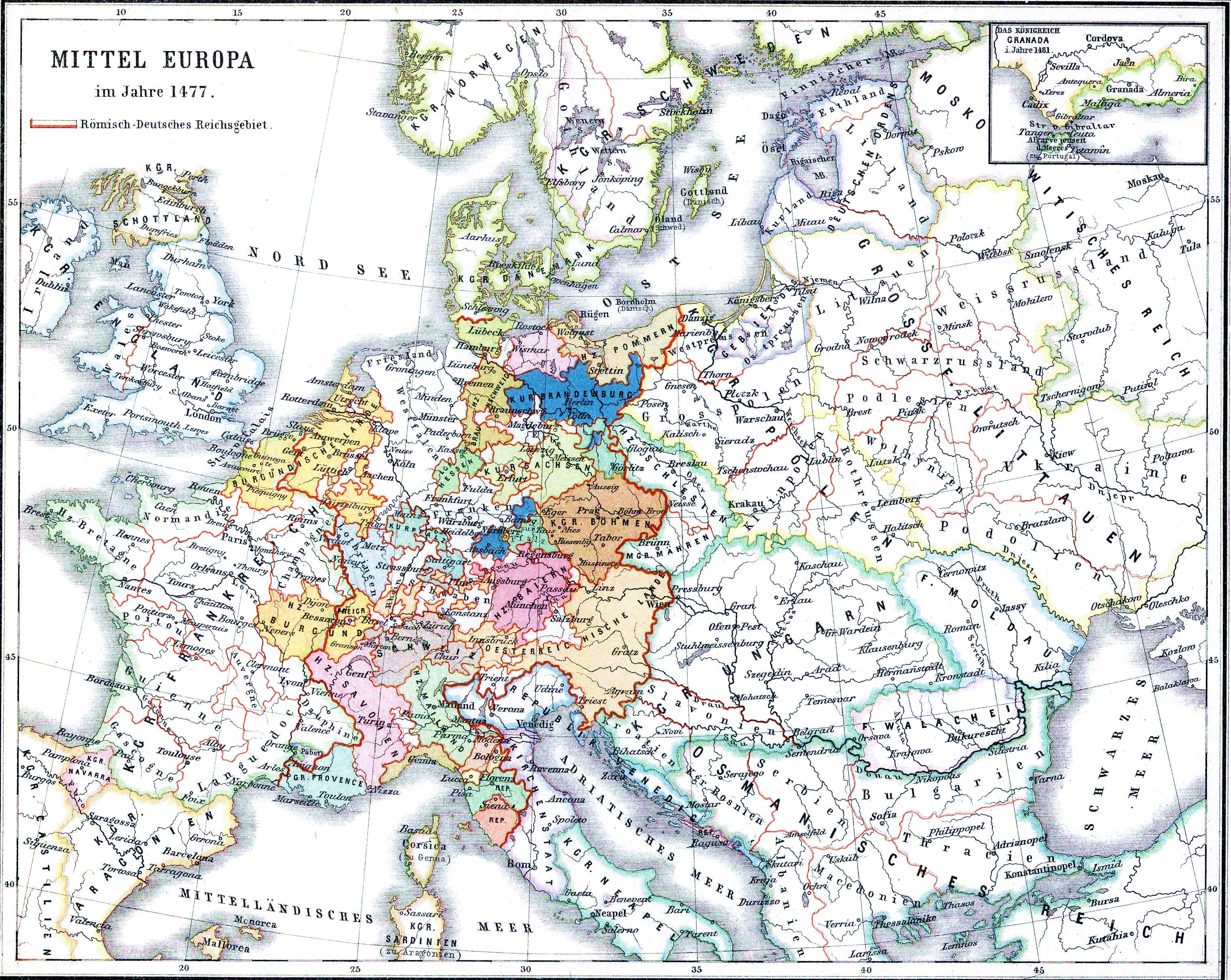
The Holy Roman Empire and Europe for the year 1477. Map from H. Kieperts Historischer Schulatlas, 1879

The fifteenth century saw a surge of interest in national history and the rise of humanist historiography north of the Alps, though established traditions remained intact. The final major wave of chronicle writing in Spain, France, and England occurred in the 1460s and 1470s. In Castile, the Cuarta Crónica General extended the narrative to 1454. Diego de Valera, who served several Castilian monarchs including Queen Isabella, compiled the Abbreviated Chronicle of Spain, blending and challenging earlier traditions. From 1482, Valera's chronicle was repeatedly reprinted and remained Spain's standard history for nearly a century. Humanist influence sometimes provoked conservative reactions; for instance, Alfonso García de Cartagena's 1456 Latin treatise Anacephaloeosis aimed to establish Castile's monarchy as Europe's oldest by affirming Gothic-Spanish continuity. Rodrigo Sánchez de Arévalo pursued a similar goal with his Compendiosa Historia Hispanica, continuing the Fourth General Chronicle.

In 1461, the accession of Louis XI marked a new phase for the Great Chronicles of France, while England saw a continuation of the Brutus chronicle in the same year. Unlike Castile and France, England had no official court chronicle, though additions to the Brutus were likely prepared in Parliament. England's traditional universal chronicles included John Capgrave's Abbreuiacion of Cronicles (c.1462–63), extending to 1417 A.D.

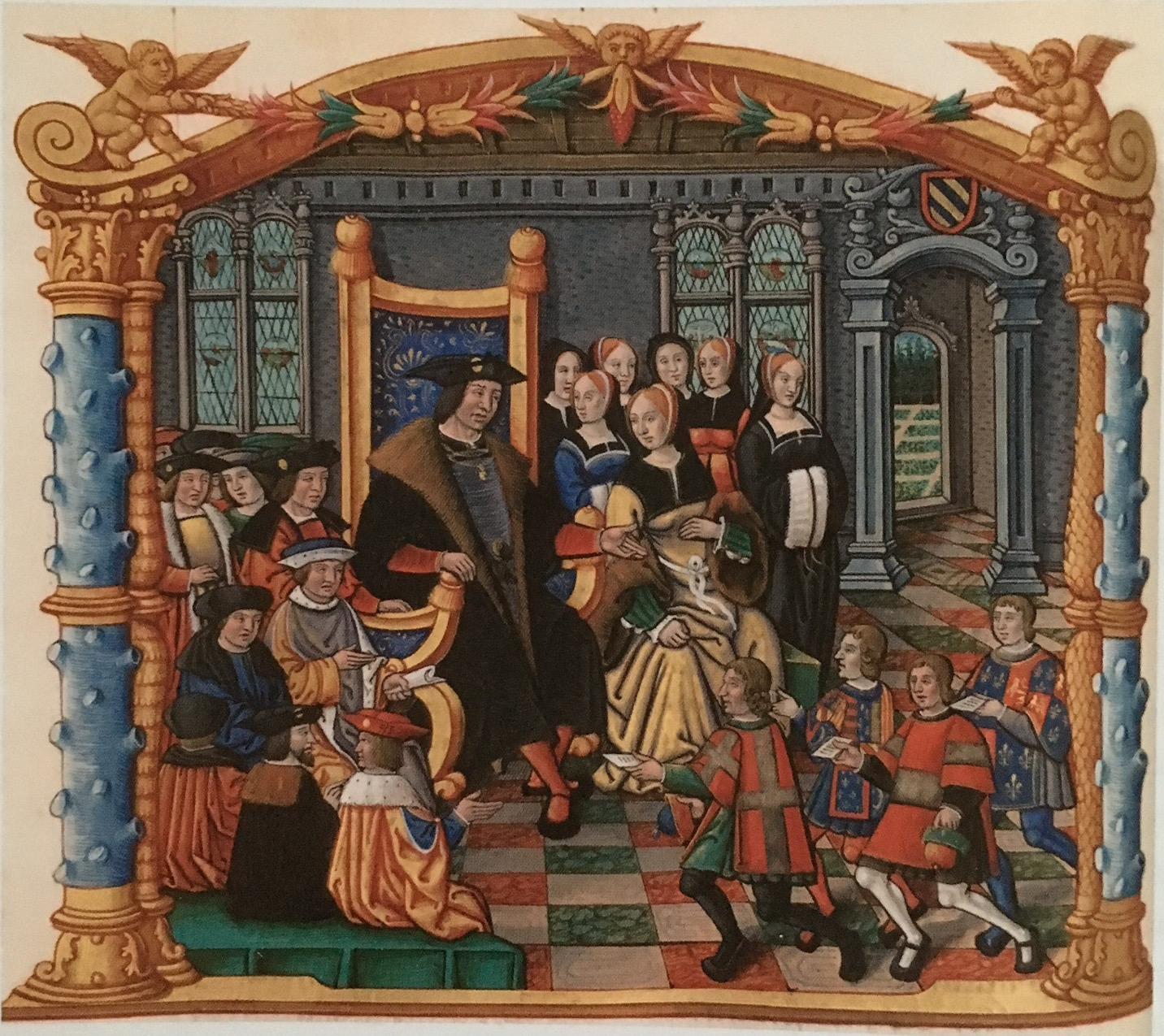
Pretenders to the hand of Mary of Burgundy. Miniature from de Commine's Memoirs, circa 1518–1524. Nantes, Musée du Dobree

Philippe de Commine was pivotal in establishing humanism in French historiography. Educated in the Burgundian tradition, he joined Louis XI's court in 1472. Commynes condemned war and saw Louis as a new ruler type, yet advocated for estates to control monarchy, drawing on English precedents. His political views have led some to consider him a precursor to Machiavelli. His Memoirs served as both political history and a transition to modern historiography, influenced by Augustine.

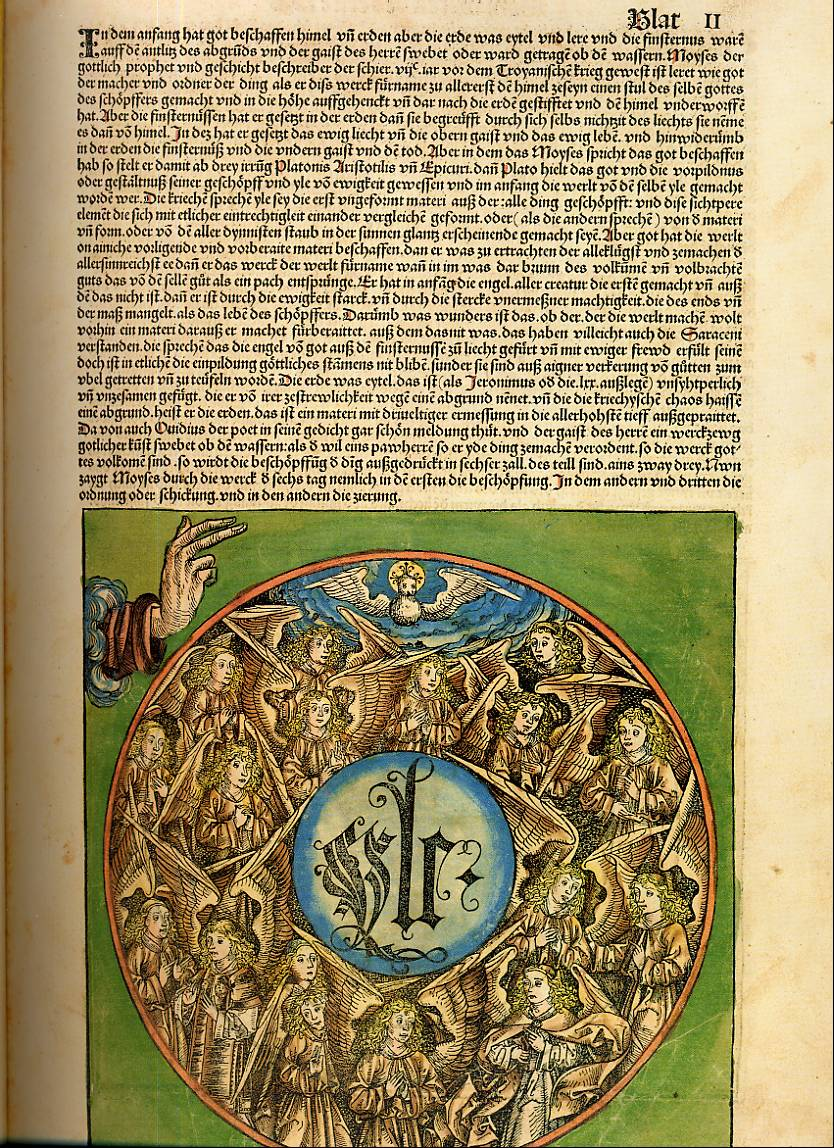
A page from the German edition of the Nuremberg Chronicle. Hand-colored illustration

The first humanist history of France, Compendium de origine et gestis Francorum by Robert Gaguin, appeared in 1495 as a continuation of the Great Chronicles. However, Paolo Emilio, court historian to Charles VIII and Louis XII, is regarded as the true founder of French humanist historiography with his De rebus gestis Francorum. A similar trend emerged in England with Polydore Vergil, active there from 1502.

Since the fourteenth century, German private chronicles were mainly authored by patricians and merchants, such as Ulman Stromer's Book of my Family and Adventures (1371–1407) and Hector Mühlich's Augsburg Chronicle, Jacob Fugger's a chronological archive including tax records and council resolutions. Such chronicles appeared in free imperial cities like Ulm, Regensburg, Cologne, and Frankfurt. The invention of printing helped foster a unified German national history. At Maximilian I's court, the 1470 printing of Tacitus' Germany inspired Alsatian humanists, who recognized the connection between Germanic and Roman worlds but not their identity. The Epitome rerum Germanicarum, begun by Sebastian Mourhaud and completed by Jacob Wimpfeling (published 1505), reflected patriotic and pedagogical aims. The Nuremberg Chronicle by Hartmann Schedel, printed in 1493 with 2,000 illustrations, combined medieval frameworks with Italian humanist influences, presenting world history through four kingdoms and six ages, including a chapter on the Holy Roman Empire and its transformation.

== Medieval historiography studies in history as a discipline ==
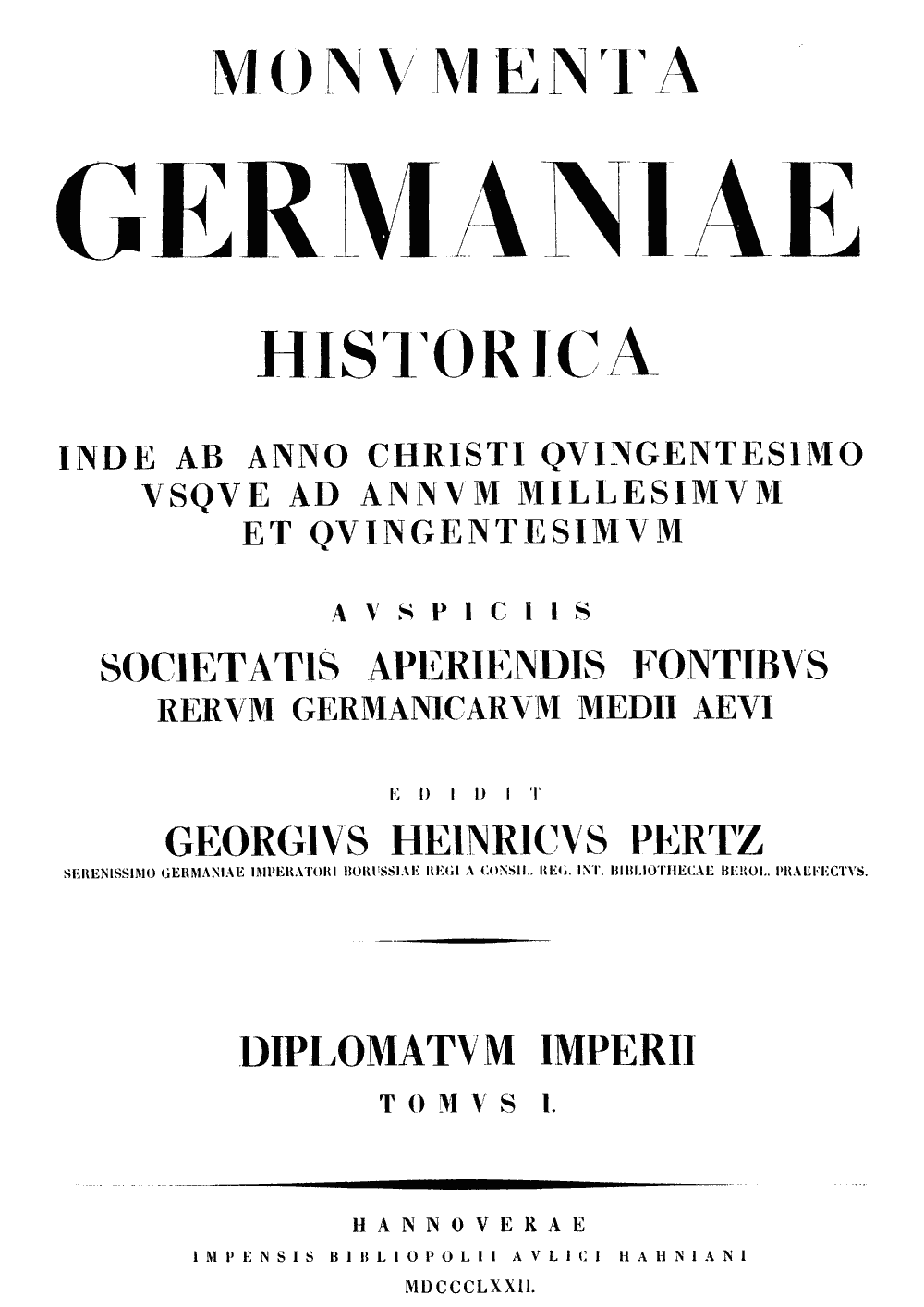
Title page of the first volume of Monumenta Germaniae Historica

Interest in medieval history emerged early in the Renaissance, as its figures sought to define and characterize the preceding era. Initially, this involved the publication of medieval sources, often for political and legal use. With the rise of modern historical science, medievalism became a distinct field, taking shape in national historiographies across Europe by the early 19th century. Each country developed its own specific approach, and the discipline was notably shaped by the historical method of Leopold von Ranke. In 19th-century medieval studies, E. V. Gutnova identified three main directions: political, historical-legal, and positivist. The political approach, led by Ranke, was influential in Germany and Russia. The historical-legal trend was founded by François Guizot, while the positivist approach gained global prominence after the 1850s. Until the 1940s, few scholars focused on medieval historiography as such—that is, on how history was understood and written in the Middle Ages. Specific studies were rare and often limited to genres like general histories (e.g., Büdinger), chronicles and annals (Poole, von Raumer), or individual historians (such as Böhmer's work on Widukind of Corvey). The positivist approach enabled the large-scale publication of historical sources, including Monumenta Germaniae Historica and the Rerum Italicarum Scriptores.

A turning point came with Herbert Grundmann's 1957 study Geschichtsschreibung im Mittelalter: Gattungen, Epochen, Eigenart, which categorized medieval historical texts by genre and tradition. This method allowed for cross-period comparisons and offered insights into the popularity of certain genres. Grundmann's work, focused on German sources, spurred a surge in research—evident, for example, in the extensive bibliography on Gregory of Tours. Roger Ray's Medieval Historiography through the 12th Century (1974) synthesized this growing field and identified key research challenges: genre classification, biblical influence, and the legacy of classical antiquity. By 2003, these concerns had expanded to include issues such as readership, historical consciousness, the concept of truth, narrative structures, literary elements, and gender.

Other significant contributions include Bernard Guenée's History and Historical Culture of the Medieval West (1980) and Franz-Josef Schmale's Introduction to the Functions and Forms of Medieval Historiography (1985). Both works explored medieval historical knowledge, conceptions of time, the role of sacred history, and the functions and audiences of historical writing. A thematic method was adopted to analyze texts, and many studies since have focused on specific genres, regions, periods, or even individual works. Reviews of national historiographies exist for England, Italy, and Spain, while in France a five-volume Typology of Historical Sources of the Western European Middle Ages was published. Critical editions appeared for early medieval annals, world chronicles, hagiographies, episcopal and monastic histories, and private chronicles. As Deliyannis observed, analyzing a single text often proves more manageable than attempting a comprehensive study of medieval history. In 2003, a general study of medieval historiography, edited by D. Deliyannis, was published in Leiden, reflecting the state of the field. Gabrielle Spiegel praised it as both accessible and insightful.

In Soviet historiography, the Marxist approach led to early general studies of medieval Western historiography. O. L. Weinstein's The Historiography of the Middle Ages appeared in 1940 and was reissued in 1964. E. A. Kosminsky's lecture series from 1938 to 1947 was published in 1963 with contributions from scholars including S. D. Skazkin and E. V. Gutnova. A. D. Lublinskaya's on the study of the sources of the history of the Middle Ages was published, 1955 textbook addressed medieval source studies, while Gutnova's handbooks (1974, 1985) explored 19th-century medieval historiography. Since 2000, scholars from the Institute of General History of the Russian Academy of Sciences have continued publishing new monographs, textbooks, and source editions.

== Bibliography ==
- Bentley, Michael, ed. (1997). Companion to historiography. Routledge World Reference. Routledge. ISBN 0-415-03084-6.
- Bobkova, M. S. (2011). Историописание и историческая мысль западноевропейского средневековья: Практикум-хрестоматия [Historiography and historical thought of the Western European Middle Ages: A practical anthology in three volumes] (in Russian). Vol. 1: IV—IX centuries (2nd, corrected and supplemented ed.). St. Petersburg: Nestor-History. ISBN 978-5-98187-792-6.
  - Volume 2: X—XIV centuries ISBN 978-5-98187-793-3
  - Volume 3: XV—XVI centuries ISBN 978-5-98187-794-0
- Cochrane, E. W. (1981). Historians and historiography in the Italian Renaissance. University of Chicago Press. ISBN 0226111520.
- Collingwood, Robin George (1980). Идея истории. Автобиография [The Idea of History. Autobiography]. Monuments of Historical Thought (in Russian). Translated by Aseeva., Yu. A. Мoscow: Nauka.
- Deliyannis, Deborah Mauskopf, ed. (2003). Historiography in the Middle Ages. Leiden: Brill. ISBN 9789004118812.
- Fine, S. Art, history, and the historiography of Judaism in Roman antiquity. — Leiden : Brill, 2014. — xvii, 234 p. — (Brill reference library of Judaism; volume 34). — ISBN 978-90-04-23816-9.
- Gurevich, A. Ya., ed. (2003). Словарь средневековой культуры [Dictionary of Medieval Culture] (in Russian). Moscow: Russian Political Encyclopedia (ROSSPEN). ISBN 5-8243-0410-6.
- Isidore of Seville (2006). The Etymologies of Isidore of Seville. Translated by Barney, Stephen A.; Lewis, W.J.; Beach, J.A.; Berghof, Oliver. Cambridge University Press. ISBN 978-0-521-83749-1.
- Greek and Roman historiography in late antiquity : fourth to sixth century A. D. / edited by Gabriele Marasco. — Leiden; Boston, Mass. : Brill, 2003. — viii, 540 p. — ISBN 90-04-11275-8.
- Medieval Concepts of the Past: Ritual, Memory, Historiography / edited by Gerd Althoff, Johannes Fried, Patrick J. Geary. — Cambridge : Cambridge University Press, 2002. — 353 p. — (Publications of the German Historical Institute). — ISBN 0-521-78066-7.
- Ловягин, А. М. (1894). Историография (in Russian) (V. XIII ed.). СПб: Энциклопедический словарь Брокгауза и Ефрона: 86 volumes. (82 main volumes and 4 additional).
- Баткин, Л. М. (1965). Данте и его время. Научно-популярная серия (in Russian). Наука. p. 200.
- Вайнштейн, О. Л. (1940). Историография средних веков в связи с развитием исторической мысли от начала средних веков до наших дней: Учебник для исторических факультетов государственных университетов и педагогических институтов (in Russian). М.—Л.: Соцэкгиз. p. 366.
- Вайнштейн, О. Л. (1964). Западноевропейская средневековая историография (in Russian). М.—Л.: Наука. p. 463.
- Гене, Б (2002). История и историческая культура Средневекового Запада. Studia historica (in Russian). М.: Языки славянской культуры. p. 496. ISBN 5-94457-023-7.
- Гутнова, Е. В. (1985). Историография истории средних веков : Учебник для студентов, обучающихся по специальности "История". Studia historica (in Russian). М.: Высшая школа. p. 479.
- Зверева, В. В. (2008). "Новое солнце на западе": Беда Достопочтенный и его время. Pax Britannica (in Russian). СПб: Алетейя. p. 248. ISBN 978-5-91419-097-9.
- Севильский, И. (2006). Этимологии, или Начала : in 20 books. Books 1—3. Семь свободных искусств (in Russian). Translated by Харитонова, Л. А. (Евразия ed.). СПб: Алетейя. p. 352. ISBN 5-8071-0171-5.
- Kosminsky, Е. А. (1963). Skazkina, S. D.; Gutnova, E. V.; Levitsky, Ya. A.; Saprykina, Yu. (eds.). Историография средних веков. V в. — середина XIX в. Лекции [Historiography of the Middle Ages. 5th century — mid-19th century. Lectures.] (in Russian). Мoscow: Moscow State University.
- Люблинская, А. Д. (1955). Источниковедение истории средних веков (in Russian). Л.: ЛГУ. p. 373.
- Санников, С. В. (2011). Образы королевской власти эпохи Великого переселения народов в западноевропейской историографии VI века : монография (in Russian). Новосибирск: Изд-во НГТУ. p. 212. ISBN 978-5-7782-1599-3.
- Сидоров, А. И. (2008). Сочинения античных, раннехристианских и "варварских" историков в культурном пространстве Каролингской эпохи // Средние века (PDF) (in Russian). pp. 46–80.
- Словарь средневековой культуры / Под ред. А. Я. Гуревича. — М. : «Российская политическая энциклопедия» (РОССПЭН), 2003. — 632 p. — («Summa culturologiae»). — ISBN 5-8243-0410-6.
- Уколова, В. И. (1989). Античное наследие и культура раннего средневековья (конец V — начало VII века) (in Russian). М.: Наука. p. 320.
- Фокин, А. Р. (2002). Беда Достопочтенный // Православная энциклопедия (in Russian). Vol. IV: Афанасий — Бессмертие. М.: Церковно-научный центр «Православная энциклопедия». pp. 426–432.
