= Annales Laurissenses =

Annales Laurissenses, meaning "annals of Lorsch", may refer to either of two sets of Reichsannalen associated with the Abbey of Lorsch:

- Annales Laurissenses minores (lesser annals of Lorsch), covering the years 680–817 and written at Lorsch
- Annales Laurissenses maiores (greater annals of Lorsch), covering the years 741–801 and discovered at Lorsch

== See also ==
- The Annales Laureshamenses (also meaning "annals of Lorsch"), a distinct set of annals based on a text originally composed at Lorsch (but not discovered there), covering the years 703–803
- The Annales laureshamenses antiquiores covering the years 768–90, but not composed at Lorsch
