= Annales iuvavenses =

Historical record of the Duchy of Bavaria (8th–10th centuries)

The page from the Annales iuvavenses maximi with the annal for 920 referring to the "kingdom of the Germans"

The Annales iuvavenses or Annals of Salzburg (German: Salzburger Annalen) are several series of annals written in Latin covering the 8th through 10th centuries. Their origin lies in Salzburg (the former Roman Iuvavum) in the duchy of Bavaria. They are among the minor Frankish annals. The original version is lost but four derivatives are found in three manuscripts and additional excerpts in a fourth.

== Textual history ==
No copy of the original Annales iuvavenses survives. Its existence is hypothesized from the identical and near identical text of certain annalistic entries in various manuscripts. Harry Bresslau argued that these annals, which he called Annales Iuvavenses antiqui ('Old Salzburg Annals'), originally covered the years 725–829 and were later given continuations down to 842 and 956 (possibly 976). In Bresslau's stemma, they are a sister text of the Annales Xantenses and Annales Maximiniani, being all derived from a compilation of annals that itself made use of the Liber Pontificalis, Annales Petaviani, Annales Regni Francorum and a lost set of annals from Lorsch Abbey. In addition to this source, Bresslau hypothesized an earlier lost set of annals from Salzburg used by the compiler of the A. iuv. antiqui. He called these annals the Annales iuvavenses antiquissimi ('Older Salzburg Annals') and concluded that they covered the years 741–821.

Two series of annal entries found in a single 9th-century manuscript, now Würzburg, Universitätsbibliothek, M.p.th.f. 46, are derived from the A. iuv. antiqui. They were added to the manuscript by Baldo of Salzburg to supplement the Annales qui dicuntur Alcuini. The series called Annales iuvavenses maiores ('Greater Salzburg Annals') covers the years 725–835 and was added to the margins of an Easter table. The other, called Annales iuvavenses minores ('Lesser Salzburg Annals'), covers the years 742–805. Another extract from the A. iuv. antiqui is found in a single 12th-century manuscript, Admont, Bibliothek des Benediktinerstifts, Cod. 718. Known as the Annales iuvavenses maximi ('Greatest Salzburg Annals'), it covers the years 725–956. The Annales sancti Emmerammi Ratisponensis maiores covering the years 748–823 are also derived from A. iuv. antiqui. The manuscript, now Munich, Bavarian State Library, Clm 14456, is from Saint Emmeram's Abbey, but the Vorlage of the text came from Mondsee Abbey and the text itself goes back to the Salzburg annals.

Bresslau, in his edition for the Monumenta Germaniae Historica series, presents the texts of the A. iuv. maximi, A. iuv. maiores, A. iuv. minores and A. s. Emmerammi in four parallel columns across two pages. The incipit (opening text) of the four annals is as follows:

Annales iuvavenses maximi
DCCXXV. Karolus primum in Baworiam venit.
[725. Charles [Martel] first came to Bavaria.]

Annales iuvavenses maiores
DCCXXV. Carolus primum in Baioariam venit.
[725. Charles [Martel] first came to Bavaria.]

Annales iuvavenses minores
Anno nativitatis Domini DCCXLII. Natus est Carolus, qui factus est rex XXVII. anno, imperator anno LX.
[AD 742. Charles [the Great] is born, who became king in his 27th year, emperor in his 60th.]

Annales sancti Emmerammi Ratisponensis maiores
DCCXLVIII. Pippinus Grifonem de Baiowaria expulit et Tasiloni duactum dedit.
[748. Pippin expelled Grifo from Bavaria and gave the duchy to Tassilo.]

Several centuries after their appearance, the Annales iuvavenses antiqui were still being used as a source. The so-called Auctarium Garstense, compiled at Admont Abbey in 1181, used them as a source for its early entries. Beginning in 1517, the Bavarian historian Johannes Aventinus added material from them as marginal notes to his copy of the Annales Fuldenses and the Annales Altahenses in Munich, Bavarian State Library, Clm 966. These Excerpta Aventini cover the period from 748 to 939 and sometimes contain information found nowhere else, but since Aventinus sometimes altered the wording their reliability is suspect.

== Content ==
The Annales iuvavenses antiqui are a useful source for southeastern German and Austrian history where they are preserved in existing compilations.

According to the Annales iuvavenses maximi in the Admont manuscript, "the Bavarians, with some other East Franks, elected Arnulf German king in opposition to Henry" (Baiuarii sponte se reddiderunt Arnolfo duci et regnare eum fecerunt in regno Teutonicorum) in 920. The date should probably be corrected to 919. This famous passage provides some of the earliest evidence for the concept of a "Kingdom of Germany", long before the such terminology for the eastern kingdom came into common use in the late 11th century. It may, however, be a 12th-century interpolation, as most scholars perceive it to be.

The Salzburg annals are the only source for an assassination attempt on incapacitated King Carloman by the Bavarians in 878 and the location of the Battle of Pressburg (Brezalauspurc) against the Hungarians in 907. They contain the first mention of Vienna in a medieval source under 881.
