= Annales guelferbytani =

The Annales guelferbytani (AG, rarely "Guelferbytan Annals") are a set of Latin annals covering the years 741–805 (with added notices for 817 and 823) that were composed in Regensburg, the capital of the Duchy of Bavaria, in 812–13. They are found in a manuscript (called "August, O, 67.5") of the ducal library of Wolfenbüttel, which contains fourteen folios, though folio 13r was added later (in 826) and folios 13v–14v later still.

The AG form one of the Reichsannalen, a series of eighth-century annals devoted, broadly, to contemporary events across Francia. For the years up to 751 the AG share a source with the Annales nazariani (AN) and the Annales alamannici (AA) in the lost so-called "Murbach Annals" from Murbach Abbey. This source also gave rise to the Annales laureshamenses, the Annales mosellani, and the Fragmentum chesnii by another route. The AG also share a continuation with the AN and AA up to 789. After that they are an anonymous, independent source. They inform us of an expedition by Pepin of Italy against the Principality of Benevento ordered by his father, Charlemagne, in 791 after the two returned from a joint expedition against the Wends and Hunia (the land of the Huns, i.e., Avaria). This campaign, unique to the AG, may correspond to a known Beneventan expedition of 792.

== Editions ==
- G. H. Pertz, ed. Monumenta Germaniae Historica, Scriptores, I (Hanover: 1826), pp. 19–46.
  - Pars prima, years 741–768, pp. 23–31.
  - Continuatio, years 769–790, pp. 40–44.
  - Pars altera, years 791–805, 817 and 823, pp. 45–46.
- Walter Lendi, ed. Untersuchungen zur frühalemannischen Annalistik (Freiburg: 1971), pp. 147–67.
