= Drogo (mayor of the palace) =

Frankish nobleman (born c. 730)

Drogo (born c. 730) was a Frankish nobleman of the Pippinid family and the eldest son of Carloman, mayor of the palace of Austrasia under the Merovingian king Childeric III. He succeeded to his father's office in 747 but was soon squeezed out of power by his uncle, Pippin III, the mayor in Neustria. He resisted his uncle's takeover, but in 753 was captured and forced to become a monk.

== Mayor in Austrasia, 747 – c. 751 ==
Carloman seems to have named his son after his own uncle, Duke Drogo of Champagne, the eldest son of Pippin II. The name of Drogo's mother is not known. He was of majority age when he witnessed a charter issued by his father in August 747. At the time Drogo was the heir of both his father and his uncle. Around October that year, his father abdicated his mayoralty, went on a pilgrimage to Rome and entered the monastery of Monte Cassino. (Note: There is a theory that Carloman did not intend to stay in Italy permanently but that he was forced against his will to enter Monte Cassino by Pope Zachary, who desired to strengthen his alliance with Pippin.)

Drogo succeeded his father in Austrasia and in rule over Alemannia and Thuringia. This fact was obscured by later chroniclers, like Einhard and the anonymous compiler of the Annals of Metz, neither of whom mention Drogo. They sought to create a simplified Pippinid family tree so as to make the position of Pippin III, founder of the Carolingian dynasty, appear stronger than it was. At the time Carloman left on his pilgrimage, Drogo's position must have been strong. The Chronicle of Fredegar claims, misleadingly, that Carloman entrusted both Austrasia and Drogo to Pippin's care.

The main piece of evidence that Drogo actually succeeded to his father's office is a short anonymous letter preserved in the collection of Saint Boniface's letters. The letter writer asks a certain Andhemus "whether he [Boniface] has gone to the synod of the duke of the western provinces [Pippin] or to the son of Carloman [Drogo]." No answer to the letter is known, but it is known that Boniface sided with Pippin. Historian Roger Collins notes that "given a choice in 747 between Pippin and his nephew, for Boniface to favour the already proven western ruler over the young and inexperienced eastern one [made] pragmatic sense."

It is not known for how long Drogo exercised mayoral authority in Austrasia. The birth of a son, Charles, to his uncle on 2 April 748 seems to have fundamentally altered the relationship between Drogo and Pippin. Soon after Pippin released his younger brother Grifo, who had been imprisoned for rebelling against Carloman. This was likely done with an eye to destabilizing Drogo's government.

== In opposition to Pippin III, 751–753 ==
By 751 Pippin's position was strong enough to gain papal support for a takeover of the kingdom. Childeric III was deposed and Pippin crowned in his place. Drogo kept up a "spirited resistance" against his uncle until 753. In that year, Pope Stephen II wrote to the Frankish nobles ordering them to support Pippin. He even came to Francia to lend his support. Carloman followed, although for what purpose is not clear. (Note: According to Stephen's biography in the Liber pontificalis, Carloman was an agent of the Lombards, inveterate enemies of the papacy, on a mission to dissuade his brother from attacking Lombard Italy. Einhard wrote that Carloman was merely acting on his abbot's orders in opposing a Papal–Frankish alliance against the Lombards.) Historian Matthias Becher argues that Carloman was trying to save Drogo's position. He was detained on Pippin's orders, fell ill and died in France in 755.

Drogo was captured along with his unnamed younger brother later in 753. The two were tonsured and put in a monastery. Drogo's capture was sufficiently important to be mentioned in three Carolingian annals: the Petavian Annals, Annals of Lorsch and Moselle Annals. In 754, Stephen II anointed Pippin, his wife Bertrada and their sons, Charles and Carloman, declaring that thenceforth none but Pippin's descendants should reign over the Franks. This was made possibly only by the elimination of Pippin's nephews as rivals.

It is possible that Drogo later made peace with his uncle and was released. A Drogo is named as a follower (fidelis) of Pippin in a document of 753 and as a count in another of 762. As Collins notes, "later [Carolingian] historiography attempted with considerable success to obscure" Drogo. Modern reconstructions of his career must "rely on a great deal of conjecture."

== Notes ==
Explanatory footnotes

Citations

== Sources ==
- Becher, Matthias (1989). "Drogo und die Königserhebung Pippins". Frühmittelalterliche Studien. 23: 131–53. doi:10.1515/9783110242218.131. S2CID 201727424.
- Bouchard, Constance B. (2013). "Childeric III and the Emperors Drogo Magnus and Pippin the Pious". Medieval Prosopography. 28: 1–16.
- Collins, Roger (1998). Charlemagne. Macmillan.
- Collins, Roger (2004). "Pippin III as Mayor of the Palace: The Evidence". Der Dynastiewechsel von 751. Münster: Scriptorium. pp. 75–92.
- Emerton, Ephraim, ed. (1940). The Letters of Saint Boniface. Columbia University Press.
- Enright, Michael (1985). Iona, Tara, and Soissons: The Origin of the Royal Anointing Ritual. Walter de Gruyter. doi:10.1515/9783110855517. ISBN 978-3-11-010628-2.
- Fouracre, Paul (2005). "The Long Shadow of the Merovingians". In Joanna Story (ed.). Charlemagne: Empire and Society. Manchester University Press. pp. 5–21. ISBN 0-7190-7089-9.
- Fouracre, Paul (2013). The Age of Charles Martel. Routledge.
