= Chronicon universale usque ad annum 741 =

Annal entries for 732–741 in the Besançon manuscript

The Chronicon universale usque ad annum 741 (lit. 'world chronicle to 741') is an anonymous Latin chronicle from the creation of the world to AD 741. It was written in Francia, probably in Burgundy, between 741 and 775. It survives wholly or partially in at least six manuscripts.

== Date and author ==
Nothing is known about the compiler of the Chronicon universale, his place of activity (other than Francia) or his motivation. It has been suggested that he worked in Burgundy. The manuscript tradition is associated with the monasteries of that region and the text includes a Burgundian origin myth.

There is a consensus that the Chronicon was written during the reign of the Byzantine emperor Constantine V (741–775). More precise—and speculative—datings include: shortly after 741, in 741–761, in 751–761, in 768–775 and shortly after 774. There are dissenters who place its composition later, either in 775–778 or around 801.

It has been suggested that the Chronicon was composed at the Carolingian court under royal patronage.

== Content and sources ==
Written in Latin, the Chronicon universale is a world chronicle divided into six sections corresponding to the traditional six ages of the world covering all of history from Creation to 741. It is a compilation with relatively little original material. The base text is the Chronica maiora of Bede, heavily interspersed with additions drawn from other sources and with a continuation in annalistic form from 721 to 741.

The compiler generally copied texts verbatim. His additions to Bede can be divided into two kinds. One set is drawn from works chronicles already used by Bede, namely the Chronicon of Jerome, the History Against the Pagans of Orosius and the Chronica maiora of Isidore. Another set is drawn from Frankish sources: the chronicle of Pseudo-Fredegar with its continuations and the Liber historiae Francorum. From 710 onwards, information is also drawn from the Frankish annals, specifically the Annales Mosellani and the Annales Flaviniacenses. The Chronicon universale was the first universal history produced in Francia since the work of Pseudo-Fredegar in the middle of the seventh century. Its Latinity is superior to the latter's. The account of Scandinavian origin of the Burgundians is shared with and may be derived from the Passio sancti Sigismundi regis.

The Chronicon universale is unique among Frankish chronicles in providing two set of anno mundi dates: one providing the years from Creation according to the Hebrew calendar (and the Latin Vulgate bible) and another providing the years according to the Byzantine calendar (and the Septuagint).

== Manuscripts ==
The start of the Chronicon in the Paris manuscript

The Chronicon universale is preserved in whole or in part in six manuscripts:

- Würzburg, Universitätsbibliothek, M. p. th. f. 46 – copied at Saint-Amand in the first quarter of the ninth century; transferred to Salzburg by 828
- Paris, Bibliothèque nationale de France, MS NAL 1615 – copied at either Auxerre or Fleury in the first half of the ninth century
- Besançon, Bibliothèque municipale, MS 186 – copied in the final third of the ninth century
- Leiden, Universiteitsbibliotheek, MS Scaliger 28 – copied probably at Flavigny in or about 816
- Munich, Bayerische Staatsbibliothek, MS lat. 246 – copied at Weltenburg in the mid-ninth century
- Brussels, Bibliothèque royale de Belgique, MS 17349–60

None of the copies is the autograph and all include changes introduced to the text between 801 and 814. Three of the manuscripts contain the whole chronicle, while the other three contain only parts. All but the Brussels manuscript incorporate the Chronicon (or part of it) into Bede's Reckoning of Time (of which his Chronica maiora is an integral part). The Besançon and Leiden copies have been called a "first edition" and the Munich copy a "second edition", since it was expanded with further additions. The Munich text, although twice as long, does not extend beyond 741. It introduces the Chronicon section with the rubric INCIPIT LIBER CHRONICORUM EX DIUERSIS OPUSCULIS AUCTORUM COLLECTA IN UNUM ('[here] begins the book of the chronicles [taken] from the diverse works of authors collected in one').

The Würzburg manuscript contains a copy of Bede's Reckoning with only a part of the prologue lifted from the Chronicon universale. The Paris manuscript likewise contains only Bede's text embellished by borrowings from the Chronicon in the prologue and final section covering the sixth age. Neither contains any post-725 material. The Brussels manuscript is a collection of extracts copied by Corneille-François de Nélis in 1783, including a selection of the Chronicon universale from 710 to 741 and its continuation down to 811, known as the Annales Maximiniani – named after the Saint Maximin's Abbey in Trier where the original, now lost manuscript was kept and examined by Alexandre Wiltheim (1604–1684), who made the initial copies, later used by Nélis.

== Historiography ==
Although it is the first universal history of the Carolingian era, the Chronicon universale is a relatively neglected and deprecated piece of Frankish historiography. François Louis Ganshof called it "a mediocre work". As a compilation made from other works, often used verbatim, it contains little that is original. It is noted mainly as the base text for the Chronicle of Moissac. It has received only a partial critical edition by Georg Waitz of the latter part of the text. Waitz used only the Leiden, Munich and Brussels copies. He supplied the text with the name by which it is now known, correctly identifying it as a world chronicle even though he only edited the latter parts concerned with Germanic history.

The manuscript transmission of the Chronicon demonstrates that neither the first nor the second edition were conceived "as stand-alone historiographies". In its "openness to constant revision" it is similar to the Frankish "minor annals" of the eighth century, on at least two of which it drew.

== Bibliography ==
- Burgess, R. W.; Kulikowski, Michael (2013). Mosaics of Time: The Latin Chronicle Traditions from the First Century BC to the Sixth Century AD. Vol. I: A Historical Introduction to the Chronicle Genre from its Origins to the High Middle Ages. Brepols.
- Close, Florence (2010). "Les Annales Maximiniani: Un récit original de l'ascension des Carolingiens". Bibliothèque de l'École des chartes. 168 (2): 303–325.
- Ghosh, Shami (2007). "On the Origins of Germanic Heroic Poetry: A Case Study of the Legend of the Burgundians". Beiträge zur Geschichte der deutschen Sprache und Literatur. 129 (2): 220–252. doi:10.1515/bgsl.2007.220. S2CID 161148492.
- Kaiser, Reinhold (2016). "Chronicon universale usque ad annum 741". In Graeme Dunphy; Cristian Bratu (eds.). Encyclopedia of the Medieval Chronicle. Brill. doi:10.1163/2213-2139_emc_SIM_00666.
- Kaschke, Sören (2021). "Enhancing Bede: The Chronicon universale to 741". In Rutger Kramer; Helmut Reimitz; Graeme Ward (eds.). Historiography and Identity III: Carolingian Approaches. Cultural Encounters in Late Antiquity and the Middle Ages. Vol. 29. Brepols. pp. 201–229. doi:10.1484/M.CELAMA-EB.5.120165. ISBN 978-2-503-58655-7. S2CID 234140412.
- Kats, J. M. J. G.; Claszen, D. (2012). Chronicon Moissiacense Maius: A Carolingian World Chronicle From Creation until the First Years of Louis the Pious (MA thesis). Leiden University.
- Marsham, Andrew (2012). "Universal Histories in Christendom and the Islamic World, c.700–c.1400". In Sarah Foot; Chase F. Robinson (eds.). The Oxford History of Historical Writing. Vol. 2: 400–1400. Oxford University Press. pp. 431–456.
- McKitterick, Rosamond (2006). Perceptions of the Past in the Early Middle Ages. University of Notre Dame Press.
- Waitz, Georg, ed. (1881). "Chronicon universale - 741, cum continuatione (Annalibus Maximinianis)". Monumenta Germaniae Historica: Scriptores. Vol. 13. Hannoverae: Impensis Bibliopolii Hahniani. pp. 1–25.
- Wood, Ian (2015). "Universal Chronicles in the Early Medieval West". Medieval Worlds (1): 47–60. doi:10.1553/medievalworlds_no1_2015s47.
- Yavuz, Nurgül Kıvılcım (2015). Transmission and Adaptation of the Trojan Narrative in Frankish History between the Sixth and Tenth Centuries (PhD diss.). University of Leeds.
