= Annales sancti Amandi =

The Annales sancti Amandi (maiores) are a set of imperial Frankish annals composed in Latin in the 8th and 9th centuries at the Benedictine monastery of Saint-Amand-les-Eaux. They share text with the related Annales Tiliani, Annales Laubacenses and Annales Petaviani, all originating in monasteries of the region of Belgica and having terse, somewhat sporadic entries. The Annales sancti Amandi was preserved in a now lost manuscript that also contained Bede's De ratione temporum. This manuscript was copied in 1638 by André Duchesne, and his copy is the one upon which all subsequent editions are based.

According to Rosamond McKitterick, the Annales sancti Amandi are probably the earliest Frankish annals. According to Graeme Dunphy, the annals appear to be the product of three different Carolingian authors, the work of the first covering the years 687–770, that of the second 771–91 and that of the third 782–810. The first annal of 687 concerns the battle of Tertry, at which the Carolingian ancestor Pippin of Heristal defeated his Neustrian rivals. The final annal of 810 records Charlemagne taking an army into Saxony and holding a public assembly (placitum) at a place called Fereda, where the Wends came and submitted to him. Under 789 the annal provides an early example of the restricted geographic sense of the term "Neustria": by that time it referred only to the land between the Loire and the Seine. The Annales sancti Amandi are preoccupied with the secular world and notices on church- or monastery-related events are presented unsystematically and seemingly at random. The work cannot have been intended to create a history for the monastic community; its main concern is with turbulence and conflict in the secular realm.

The Annales sancti Amandi are not to be confused with the Annales sancti Amandi breves and Annales sancti Amandi brevissimi, sets of briefer annals compiled as marginal notes in other manuscripts from the same monastery. The first brevissimi ("very brief") entry, for 760, is just "solar eclipse" (eclipsis solis). Its last, for 796, is "Pope Adrian died" (Adrianus papa obit), although he actually died on 25 December 795. These annals accompany an Easter table for the years 760–97. The breves ("briefs") consist in a series of notes for the years 742 to 855 beside an Easter table covering the years 741 to 941. Its first entry records that "Charlemagne was born" (Carolus natus est) and its last that "King Lothair died" (Hlotharius rex obiit).
