= 801 Apennine earthquake =

Coordinates: 42.468°N 13.566°E

An earthquake originating in the Central Apennines was felt in Rome and Spoleto on 29 April 801. It is reported in two independent contemporary sources, Einhard's Royal Frankish Annals and the Liber Pontificalis. The information provided by the written sources has been augmented by archaeology.

Both the Annals and the Liber date the event to 30 April according to contemporary Roman practice, whereby the day began at sundown. The Annals specify that it happened at the second hour of the night, which corresponds to 20:00 (8:00 p.m.) on 29 April by modern reckoning. The Annals record the event from the perspective of the Frankish king Charlemagne, who had been crowned Roman emperor on 25 December 800 and had left Rome on 25 April for Spoleto, where he was staying when the earthquake struck. They do not record the damage at Spoleto. Charlemagne was unharmed, but perhaps spooked.

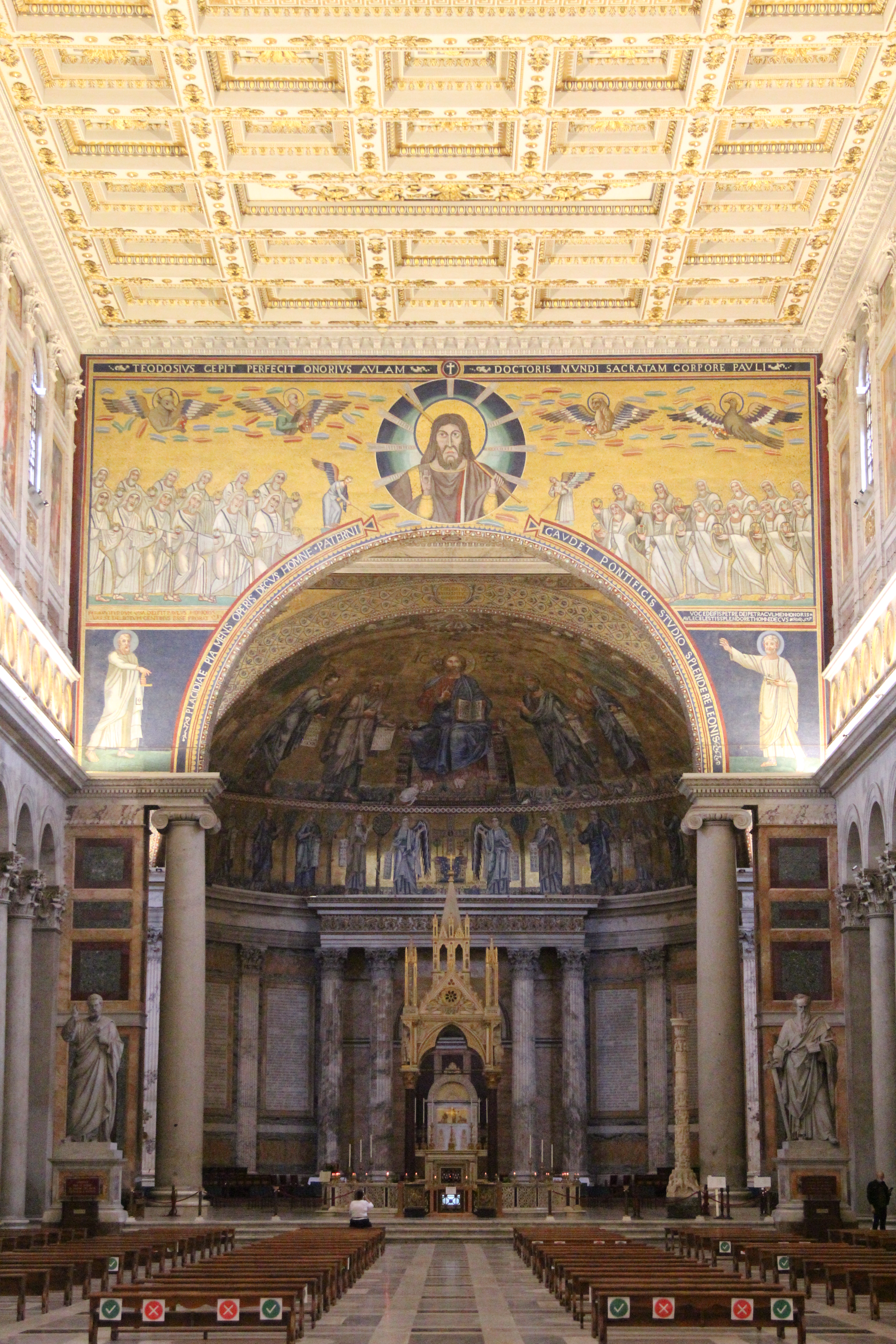
The triumphal arch in San Paolo, seemingly damaged during the earthquake of 801 and repaired by Leo III

The quake was severe, with an estimated magnitude at Rome of VII–VIII on the modified Mercalli intensity scale and 5.4 on the energy magnitude scale. The epicenter was probably somewhere between Spoleto and Perugia. The Annals refer to its effects throughout Italy, but without specifics. Both sources attest its damage to the roof of the basilica of San Paolo Fuori le Mura in Rome. The archaeologist Rodolfo Lanciani concluded that the damage was even more severe than the sources let on and that Pope Leo III had to rebuild the basilica "from the introit to the presbytery, from the marble floor to the summit of the roof." The Liber mentions the earthquake mainly to introduce Leo III's works at San Paolo, but it leaves the impression that the collapse of the roof caused extensive damage to the interior furnishings (including the silverware stored beneath the altar) and the porticoes. The 5th-century mosaic on the triumphal arch appears to have suffered stylistically from repairs, probably associated with the earthquake of 801. The presbytery was completely rebuilt.

Archaeology has revealed several buildings damaged or destroyed by earthquakes which may have been victims of that of 801. The church of Santa Petronilla on the Via Ardeatina seems to have collapsed entirely in an earthquake, probably that of 801. At that time, it was already abandoned. It had been the burial church of Saints Nereus and Achilleus, but their remains seem to have been transferred inside the city sometime before 801. The remains of Petronilla had been moved to a new shrine in the city in 757 in fulfillment of a promise to Charlemagne's father, Pippin the Short. The Basilica Ulpia also seems to have fallen in an earthquake in about the 9th century. In the case of both buildings, the evidence is also consistent with the earthquake of 847.

The Annals shows that the earthquake caused landslides. It could not have caused a tsunami in the Adriatic, although it has been conflated in some sources with a possible tsunami-causing earthquake of 792 in the northern Adriatic.

== Primary sources ==
- Royal Frankish Annals:
  While [Charlemagne] was staying [in Spoleto], on April 30, in the second hour of the night, a tremendous earthquake occurred which severely shook the whole of Italy. Because of this tremor a large part of the roof of the basilica of the blessed apostle Paul with its wooden framework collapsed, and in some places mountains tumbled on top of cities. In the same year also some places along the Rhine, in Gaul, and in Germany were hit with tremors.
- Liber Pontificalis:
  In the 9th indiction the menace of our sins brought about a sudden earthquake on 30 April. The earthquake shook St Paul's church and all the roofing collapsed. Seeing this, the great and distinguished pontiff [Leo III] was greatly afflicted and began to bewail the damage and destruction to the silver and other valuables therein. But by the Lord's will and by the prince of the holy apostles' protection, the pontiff put all his efforts into the task of restoring it as it was of old.
- There are several other medieval sources which mention the earthquake, but these are derivative of the two primary sources. They include the Annales Blandinienses, Annales Iuvavenses, Annales Fuldenses, Annales Tiliani, Annales Mettenses and Annales Ratisponenses, as well as the works of Regino of Prüm, Hermann of Reichenau, Bernold of Constance, the Annalista Saxo, Petrus Comestor and Ptolemy of Lucca.

== Bibliography ==
- Camerlenghi, Nicola (2012). "Interpreting Medieval Architecture Through Renovations: The Roof of the Old Basilica of San Paolo in Rome". In Mark J. Johnson; Robert Ousterhout; Amy Papalexandrou (eds.). Approaches to Byzantine Architecture and its Decoration: Studies in Honor of Slobodan Ćurčić. Routledge. pp. 259–276.
- Camerlenghi, Nicola (2018). St. Paul's Outside the Walls: A Roman Basilica, from Antiquity to the Modern Era. Cambridge University Press.
- Caputo, Michele; Faita, G. F. (1982). "Statistical Analysis of the Tsunamis of the Italian Coasts". Journal of Geophysical Research. 87 (C1): 601–604. Bibcode:1982JGR....87..601C. doi:10.1029/JC087iC01p00601.
- Cataldi, Daniele (2022). "Lake of Nemi, Rome Italy – Archaeological Research near an Ancient Roman-period Dock Covered by a Landslide". International Journal of Social Relevance & Concern. 10 (4): 91–112.
- Davis, Raymond, ed. (1992). The Lives of the Eighth-Century Popes (Liber Pontificalis): The Ancient Biographies of Nine Popes from AD 715 to AD 817. Liverpool University Press.
- Fried, Johannes (2016) [2013]. Charlemagne. Translated by Peter Lewis. Harvard University Press.
- Galadini, Fabrizio; Ricci, Giovanni; Falcucci, Emanuela; Panzieri, Camilla (2018). "Archaeoseismological Evidence of Past Earthquakes in Rome (Fifth to Ninth century A.D.) Used to Quantify Dating Uncertainties and Coseismic Damage". Natural Hazards. 94 (1): 319–348. Bibcode:2018NatHa..94..319G. doi:10.1007/s11069-018-3390-0.
- Guidoboni, E.; Tinti, S. (1988). "The Largest Historical Tsunamis in the Northern Adriatic Sea: A Critical Review". In E. N. Bernard (ed.). Proceedings of the International Tsunami Symposium: International Union of Geodesy and Geophysics, August 18 to 19, 1987. Contribution ... From NOAA/Pacific Marine Environmental Laboratory; no. 1041. Pacific Marine Environmental Laboratory. pp. 59–63.
- Guidoboni, E.; Comastri, A.; Traina, G. (1994). "No. 257: 29 April 801 c. 8 p.m. – Rome, Spoletium" (PDF). Catalogue of Ancient Earthquakes in the Mediterranean Area up to the 10th Century. INGV-SGA.
- Guidoboni, E.; Ferrari, G.; Mariotti, D.; Comastri, A.; Tarabusi, G.; Sgattoni, G.; Valensise, G. (2018). "801 04 29, 20:00 Roma (Italy)". Catalogo dei Forti Terremoti in Italia (461 a.C.–1997) e nell'area Mediterranea (760 a.C.–1500). Istituto Nazionale di Geofisica e Vulcanologia.
- Nelson, Janet L. (2019). King and Emperor: A New Life of Charlemagne. Penguin.
- Scholz, Bernhard Walter (1970). Carolingian Chronicles: Royal Frankish Annals and Nithard's Histories. University of Michigan Press. ISBN 978-0-472-08790-7.
