= Annales Tiliani =

The Annales Tiliani are an anonymous set of Latin annals from the Frankish kingdom, covering the years 708–807. They are considered minor annals.

Rosamond McKitterick groups the Annales Tiliani, Annales sancti Amandi and Annales Laubacenses into an "Austrasian" group based on the region where they probably originated, the area around Trier and Cologne. These annals all rely on the so-called "Austrian annals", a lost work covering 708–772. Cristian Bratu groups the Annales Tiliani with the Annales Laubacenses and Annales Petaviani.

The Annales Tiliani rely on a "minor" source for the first part and the semi-official Annales regni Francorum for the second part. They and the Annales sancti Amandi draw upon the same source for the years 708–737, if a version of the latter is not simply the source for the former. Both sets of annals begin with the death of Duke Drogo of Champagne. The first entry in the Annales Tiliani reads: Quando Drogo mortuus est ("when Drogo died"). It is possible that they were first composed around 708 or not long after, well before the Annales regni Francorum begin in 741. Xabier Irujo puts their compilation around 808, shortly after the last entry.

For the years 741–807, the Annales Tiliani epitomize the Annales regni Francorum. They appear to have used the first recension of the source. This gives them a fuller account than other minor annals for this period. It also gives them greater emphasis on God's role in events, which is often ignored by the minor annals. Still, they omit many references to God found in the Annales regni Francorum. Because they combine unrelated sets of annals that are both derived from other works, Sören Kaschke regards them as not truly a work of historiography in their own right, but a "compendium that juxtaposes separate texts, with minor redactions".

The Annales Tiliani are the only source to indicate warfare on several occasions where other sources merely indicate the presence of an army and no combat. Under 730, they claim that Charles Martel fought against Duke Lantfrid in Alemannia. Under 731, they claim that Charles fought in Aquitaine against Duke Eudo, a claim picked up and embellished by the Annales Mettenses priores. Under 735, they claim that Charles fought in Aquitaine after Eudo's death.

The Annales Tiliani are named after Bishop Jean du Tillet (died 1570), who owned the only known manuscript, which is now lost. This manuscript was not complete and it is possible that the annals originally went beyond 807. It was copied in the 18th century, and it was this late copy that was the basis of Georg Pertz's edition.

== Editions ==
- Annales Tiliani, ed. G. H. Pertz in Monumenta Germaniae Historica, Scriptores I (Hanover: Hahn, 1826), pp. 6–8, 219–224.

== Bibliography ==
- "Annales Tiliani (Jahrbücher des Jean du Tillet)". Geschichtsquellen des deutschen Mittelalters. 2022.
- Bachrach, Bernard S. (2001). Early Carolingian Warfare: Prelude to Empire. University of Pennsylvania Press.
- Bratu, Cristian (2021). "Annales Tiliani". In Graeme Dunphy; Cristian Bratu (eds.). Encyclopedia of the Medieval Chronicle. Brill Online. doi:10.1163/2213-2139_emc_SIM_199020.
- Davis, Jennifer R. (2015). Charlemagne's Practice of Empire. Cambridge University Press.
- Evans, Robert (2022). "Christian Language and the Frankish 'Minor' Annals: Narrative, History and Theology in the Late Eighth Century". The Medieval Chronicle. 14: 159–183.
- Halphen, Louis (1921). Études critiques sur l'histoire de Charlemagne: Les sources de l'histoire de Charlemagne, la conquête de la Saxe, le couronnement impérial, l'agriculture et la propriété rurale, l'industrie et le commerce. Félix Alcan.
- Irujo, Xabier (2021). Charlemagne's Defeat in the Pyrenees: The Battle of Rencesvals. Amsterdam University Press.
- Kaschke, Sören (2022). "Fluid Historiography: The Annales Petaviani and the (Re)Writing of History in the Eighth Century". The Medieval Chronicle. 14: 113–135.
- McKitterick, Rosamond (1983). The Frankish Kingdoms under the Carolingians, 751–987. Longman.
- McKitterick, Rosamond (2006). Perceptions of the Past in the Early Middle Ages. University of Notre Dame Press.
- Turner, C. H. (1905). "Jean du Tillet: A Neglected Scholar of the Sixteenth Century". The Bodleian Manuscript of Jerome's Version of the Chronicle of Eusebius. Clarendon Press. Appendix V, pp. 48–63.
- van Hees, Bart (2022). "Minor Annals and Frankish History Writing". The Medieval Chronicle. 14: 92–112.
