= Lorsch Pharmacopoeia =

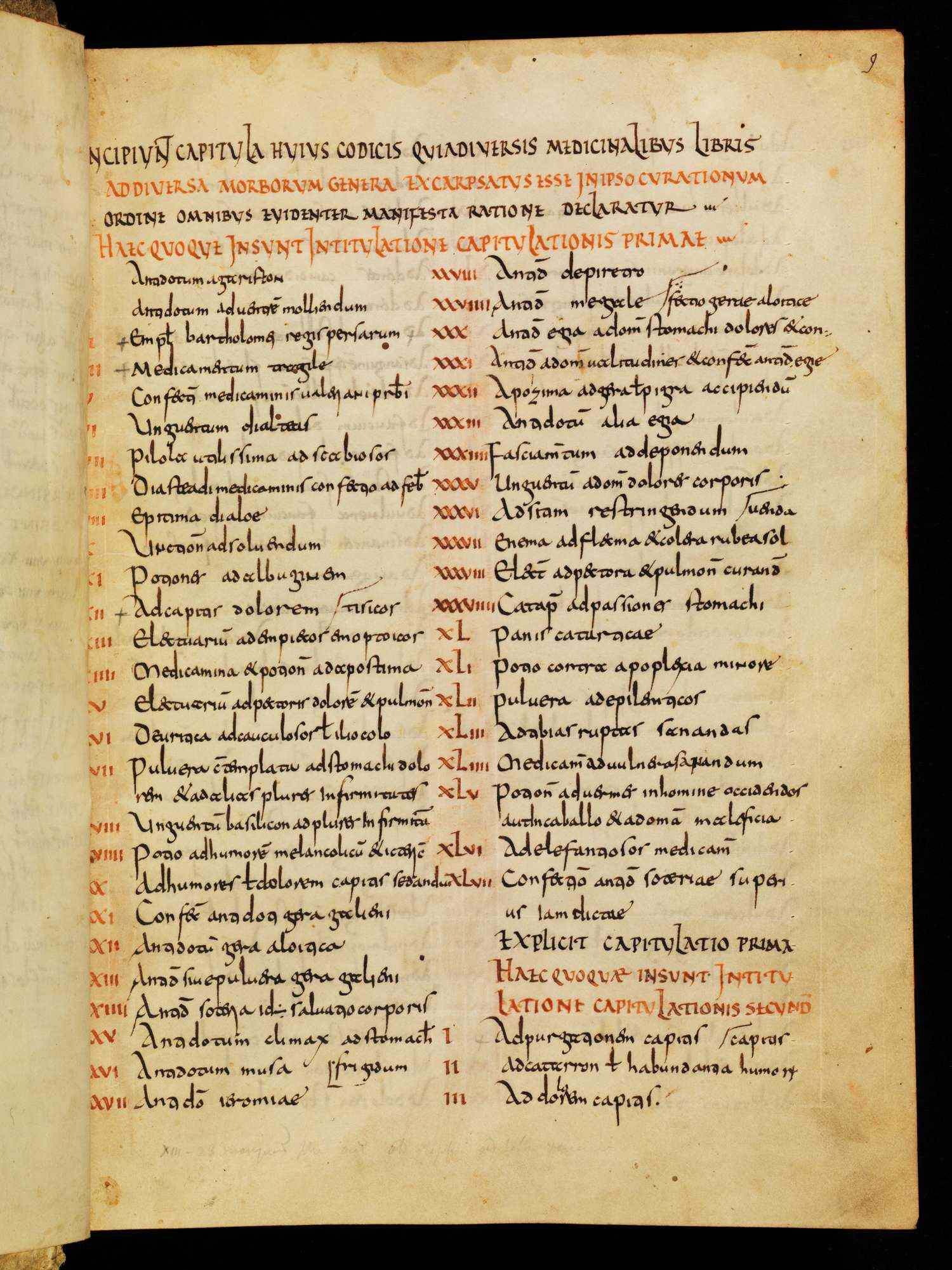
Table of contents (folio 9 recto)

The Lorsch Pharmacopoeia (sometimes called the Lorsch Leechbook, Lorscher Arzneibuch or Lorsch Book of Remedies) is an extensive medical manuscript composed around Lorsch Abbey during the era of Charlemagne, likely created around 785. It has been described as the oldest preserved book on monastic medicine from the early medieval West, and the oldest preserved medical book in Germany.

The pharmacopoeia, containing 482 recipes, was written under Benedictine auspices in Latin at Lorsch Abbey (today's Bergstraße district, Hesse), probably under Richbod, the abbot of the imperial abbey. Since the beginning of the 11th century, it has been located in Bamberg and is currently preserved in the Bamberg State Library under the call number Msc.Med.1 (old call number: L.III.8). At the Institute for the History of Medicine at the University of Würzburg, Ulrich Stoll and Gundolf Keil facsimiled, edited, and translated the manuscript into German in a three-year project that was completed in 1989. Since June 2013, the Lorsch Pharmacopoeia has been included by UNESCO on the Memory of the World international register. The Lorsch Pharmacopoeia is the oldest German pharmacopoeia, systematically compiled as a medical compendium.

== Origin and history ==
The Lorsch Pharmacopoeia – first so named by the Würzburg medical historian Gundolf Keill – was previously known as the Codex Bamberginsis medicinalis 1 (or Bamberger Codex Med. 1), and was written by several scribes in the Benedictine Abbey of Lorsch. This attribution, along with its dating to the late 8th century, was demonstrated by the palaeographer Bernhard Bischoff in 1964, thanks to its Carolingian minuscule script in the old Lorsch style.

The dating of the Lorsch Pharmacopoeia is disputed. It ranges from the late 8th to the early 9th century. Bernhard Bischoff initially dated the manuscript to "between 781 and 783" and "just after 800" then later to "early 9th century“. Gundolf Keil dated its compilation first to 795, later to 792, then back to 790 and eventually spoke about the time "around 788“. Klaus-Dietrich Fischer, a medical historian, contradicted Keil's arguments and preferred the chronological dating of Bischoff.

The Bamberg manuscript also contains Old High German glosses originating from the Rhineland. These additions and comments to the recipes (for instance "petriniola id est uuizebluomon" in the Greek-latin plant glossary) signal its continuing usage in the 9th and 10th centuries.

The manuscript contains on a half-empty page (folio 42v) the only known (partial) book list of an imperial library from the early Middle Ages, written by Leo of Vercelli (died 1026), the teacher and confidant of Emperor Otto III. This book list allows the history of the Lorsch Pharmacopoeia to be reconstructed. After the early death of Emperor Otto III in 1002, the manuscript came into the possession of his successor, Emperor Henry II, who donated it to the cathedral library of the diocese of Bamberg, which he founded in 1007. From there, the codex, newly bound in 1611 by order of the Cathedral Provost Johann Christoph Neustetter, known as Stürmer, and the Cathedral Dean Hektor von Kotzau, was transferred to the Electorate Library of Bamberg during the secularization in 1803, which is today's Bamberg State Library, where the manuscript is kept under the call number Msc.Med.1.

The manuscript, first described in 1831 and known to only a few specialists from 1863, was extensively studied in the 1980s by the Institute for the History of Medicine at the University of Würzburg. The results of these studies were presented in 1989 during a symposium in Lorsch; in the same year, a two-volume edition featuring a reproduction of the manuscript and a German translation was published. An accessible introduction to the codex was also released in 1989, followed by a dissertation with text, German translation, and a specialized glossary in 1992. Part of the manuscript has been translated into English.

== Content, Sources and Arrangement ==
The Lorsch Pharmacopoeia comprises 75 calf parchment sheets measuring 32 × 22.5 cm, densely written in a single column with 32 to 33 lines. Originally, the codex consisted of 107 sheets (the losses occurred after the early medieval period but before 1611). The medical-pharmaceutical manuscript proves to be a systematically arranged compendium, designed as a reference work for the practical everyday work of a monastery physician, as well as an introductory textbook without an independent surgical part. The main section (starting from sheet 17) consists of a collection of 482 recipes of Greek-Roman tradition. It describes the ingredients, production, and application of the drugs. Embedded in this (pharmacographical) recipe collection, which contains both short recipes (Receptarium) and full recipes (called "Antidotarium"), are treatises on the history of medicine and medical ethics.

Direct sources that can be identified include the "Physica Plinii" (6th/7th century), Byzantine medicine, and writings from the 7th century by the so-called "Aurelius Aesculapius" or Aurelius-Escolapius or Esculapius (De acutis passionibus by Aurelius, or Caelius Aurelianus, and De acutis et chronicis morbis by Aesculapius,). Indirectly (via Byzantine medicine), the codex also incorporated works of Dioscorides (De Materia Medica, a pharmacographic herbal) and Galen, as well as (via the Physica Plinii) the "Medicina Plinii," which originated in the 4th century.

The individual text comprises:

=== Preface: Defence of the art of medicine (Defensio artis medicinae) ===
In the preface (folio 1r to 5r), the art of healing is defended against the reservations of notable Christians who saw it as an impermissible interference with the divine plan of salvation. The argumentation of this defense or justification of medicine aims to define medical practice as a commandment of Christian-mandated charity. For this purpose, the author relies on authoritative Christian texts of his time.

=== Poem (Versus seu Carmina) ===
Following on folio 5r are verses about Cosmas and Damian, which continue and supplement the theme of defending medicine discussed in the preface. Various sources such as Isidore and Marcellus Empiricus are drawn upon, with the authoritative figures of Hippocrates and Galen placed on a similar level alongside the saints Cosmas and Damian. This segment essentially constitutes a medicinal ordinance in verse form. The author demands, as part of his medicinal-political concerns, that medical art should be accessible not only to the wealthy but equally to the poor. It is also recommended to use not only expensive medicinal plants and drugs from the Orient but, to reduce costs, equally effective local medicines as well.

=== Introduction to medicine (Initia medicinae) ===
This component on folio 6r deals with the history of medicine, anatomy and the Hippocratic Oath.

=== The Questions of Aristotle (Problemata Aristotelis) ===
A Pseudo-aristotelian collection of medical advice in question and answer form, on folios 6v to 7v.

=== Representatives of literary genres closely associated with astrological literature. ===
These writings on medicine in the monthly or annual cycle include on folio 8r, among other things, "Critical Days" (Dies incerti, the newer form of "Rejected Days") and "Egyptian Days" (Dies aegyptiaci, the older form of the month-related "Rejected Days") as a contribution to prognosis, as well as dietetically relevant texts on the monthly drink (Hippocras or lûtertranc), and additionally, in the 2nd recipe book on folio 38v to 41v, on a Four Seasons Drink ("Lautertrank") and Twelve Month Rules (Regimen duodecim mensium).

=== Substitution list (Antemballomena sive De succedaneis) ===
On folios 8v to 17r, pharmacological and pharmaceutical treatises are found. At the start, alternatives for many medicinal drugs are listed fragmentarily as a quid-pro-quo drug exchange list (antemballomena).

=== Table of contents (Conspectus curationum capitulationibus V comprehensorum) ===
A nearly complete directory of all the recipes contained in the work (table of contents for the compounded medicines in the five books that follow, capitulationes) can be found on folios 9r to 15r.

=== Greco-Latin glossary (Hermeneumata sive Glossarium pigmentorum vel herbarum) ===
A list of medicinal drugs with Greek and Latin synonyms is written down as a directory of simple medicines (pigmenta vel herbae) or herbal glossary on folios 15v to 17r..

Before the following collection of recipes, humoral pathological excerpts from Vindician's instructional letter to Pentadius are listed as page-fillers on folio 17r.

=== Recipe collection (Curationes capitulationibus V comprehensae) ===
Divided into five books, a total of 482 recipes of varying complexity are found on folios 17v to 70v. These therapeutic-pharmaceutical recipe books particularly deal with dosage forms such as potions, electuaries, pills, plasters, compresses, suppositories, ointments, and oils. Some sections of this Materia Medica focus on the extraction or production of medicinal substances like sulfur and verdigris, the origin of spices like pepper and ginger, or the manufacturing and storage of medicines in general.

Among the recipes, there are some highly innovative methods for that time, such as the use of cardiac glycosides (scillaren from the sea onion) for circulatory stabilization (folio 31v), the psychiatric use of St. John's wort, or an antibiotic treatment (with mold from dry cheese, folio 31v) for deep wounds and ulcers. The recipes also include the use of camphor.

The books of the recipe collection (Folio 17v to 70v):

- Book 1 (folio 17v to 22v): primarily based on Galen, a scientific tradition of antidotes
- Book 2 (folio 22v to 42v): contains excerpts ordered by indications (therapeutic indications) and from head to toe, allegedly (according to the author, folio 35v) taken from a writing by the physician Caelius Aurelianus, from the Physica Plinii, as well as various tables and short treatises. Folio 23r contains a table with the units of measurement and weights used in the recipes.
- Book 3 (folio 43r to 50v): partly organized by therapeutic indications, short recipes and interspersed antidotes
- Book 4 (folio 51r to 56v): primarily involves purging of bad humors with short and full recipes, and pharmacognostic-pharmaceutical treatises partly based on Dioscorides (Three pharmacographical chapters on spices, short treatise (folio 54v) on medicine weights and medicinal measures, Galenic treatise on the preparation or production of simple medicinal substances)
- Book 5 (folio 57r to 71v): a systematic text unit consisting of four sections (Antidotarium, purging recipes, ointment recipes, medicinal oils)

=== The Anthimus Letter (De observatione ciborum epistula ad Theodericum regem Francorum) ===
Folios 72r bis 75r contain a letter from the doctor Anthimus to the Frankish king Theuderich I., which deals with healthy diet.

== Scholarly significance ==
The Lorsch Pharmacopoeia combined, for the first time, the knowledge of ancient medicine of Greek-Roman tradition with Christian beliefs, and paved the way for early medieval monastic medicine into the European canon of science.

The entire work can be seen as evidence of a reassessment of medicine during the Carolingian educational reform around 800. The preface provides a justification against the reservations of some Christians who saw medicine as an impermissible interference in the divine plan of salvation. The defense derives from the Bible and theological writings both the right and the duty to help the sick with the knowledge and means given by God, as an act of Christian-mandated charity. These explanations provide the most extensive and earliest argumentative textual evidence for the reception of ancient traditions during the Carolingian educational reform: They document the first post-antique impulse for a transformation process that resulted in the adoption of the ancient heritage under a Christian banner. Specifically for medicine, this set the course that continues to influence today in the combination of secular science and an ethics of help. The Bamberg manuscript also stands for this innovation originating from monasticism.

== See also ==
- Lorscher Bienensegen
- Lorscher Codex
- Lorscher Evangeliar

== Editions and German translations ==
- Gundolf Keil (ed.): Das Lorscher Arzneibuch. Band 1: Faksimile der Handschrift Msc. Med. 1 der Staatsbibliothek Bamberg. Band 2: Übersetzung […] von Ulrich Stoll und Gundolf Keil unter Mitwirkung von Albert Ohlmeyer. Wissenschaftliche Verlagsgesellschaft, Stuttgart 1989, ISBN 3-8047-1078-6
- Ulrich Stoll: Das „Lorscher Arzneibuch“. Ein medizinisches Kompendium des 8. Jahrhunderts (Codex Bambergensis medicinalis 1). Text, Übersetzung und Fachglossar. (Philosophische Dissertation Würzburg 1989) Steiner, Stuttgart 1992 (= Sudhoffs Archiv, Beiheft 28), ISBN 3-515-05676-9 See the review by Alf Önnerfors in: Gnomon. Kritische Zeitschrift für die gesamte klassische Altertumswissenschaft 66, 1994, S. 688–695.

== English translations ==
- Joel Gamble, 'A Defense of the Carolingian 'Defense of Medicine": Introduction, Translation and Notes', Traditio 75 (2020) 87-125 https://doi.org/10.1017/tdo.2020.4

== Literature ==
- Karl Sudhoff: Eine Verteidigung der Heilkunde aus den Zeiten der „Mönchsmedizin“. In: Archiv für Geschichte der Medizin 7, 1913, Heft 4, S. 223–237.
- Willy Lizalek: Heilkundliche Rezepte aus der Lorscher Klosterbibliothek. In: Geschichtsblätter für den Kreis Bergstraße. Heft 13, 1970, S. 23–34; Nachdruck in Beiträge zur Geschichte des Klosters Lorsch. 2. Auflage, Lorsch 1980 (= Geschichtsblätter für den Kreis Bergstraße. Sonderband 4), S. 253–264.
- Gundolf Keil, Albert Ohlmeyer: Lorscher Arzneibuch. In: Verfasserlexikon. 2. Auflage. Band 11, 2004, Sp. 926–930.
- Bernhard Bischoff: Lorsch im Spiegel seiner Handschriften. Arben-Gesellschaft, München 1973 (= Münchener Beiträge zur Mediävistik und Renaissance-Forschung. Beiheft); erweiterter Wiederabdruck in: Friedrich Knöpp (Hrsg.): Die Reichsabtei Lorsch. Festschrift zum Gedenken an ihre Stiftung 764. 2 Bände. Darmstadt 1973–1977, hier: Band 2 (1977), S. 7–128. 2., erweiterte Auflage: Die Abtei Lorsch im Spiegel ihrer Handschriften. Hrsg. vom Heimat- und Kulturverein Lorsch mit Unterstützung der Stadt Lorsch und des Kreises Bergstraße. Laurissa, Lorsch 1989 (= Geschichtsblätter für den Kreis Bergstraße. Sonderband 10), S. 31–33, 67 und 102.
- Adelheid Platte, Karlheinz Platte (Hrsg.): Das „Lorscher Arzneibuch“. Klostermedizin in der Karolingerzeit: Ausgewählte Texte und Beiträge. Hrsg. im Auftrag der Stadt Lorsch. Laurissa, Lorsch 1989; 2. Auflage ebenda 1990.
- Ulrich Stoll, Gundolf Keil, Ria Jansen-Sieben: Brief des erlauchten Anthimus an Theoderich, den König der Franken. Auszug aus dem „Lorscher Arzneibuch“. Übersetzung der Handschrift Msc.Med.1 der Staatsbibliothek Bamberg. Wissenschaftliche Verlagsgesellschaft, Stuttgart 1989.
- Gundolf Keil, Paul Schnitzer (Hrsg.): Das „Lorscher Arzneibuch“ und die frühmittelalterliche Medizin. Verhandlungen des Medizinhistorischen Symposiums im September 1989 in Lorsch. Laurissa, Lorsch 1991 (= Geschichtsblätter für den Kreis Bergstraße. Sonderband 12).
- Alf Önnerfors: Sprachliche Bemerkungen zum sogenannten „Lorscher Arzneibuch“. In: Maria Iliescu, Werner Marxgut (Hrsg.): Latin vulgaire – latin tardif III. Actes du IIIème Colloque international sur le Latin vulgaire et tardif. Niemeyer, Tübingen 1992, S. 255–281.
- Silke Körlings-König: Das ‚Lorscher Arzneibuch‘. Vergleichende Untersuchung eines Arzneibuches aus dem 8. Jahrhundert. Diss. Tierärztliche Hochschule Hannover, 1992.
- Hermann Schefers: Iste est laudabilis ordo. Ein Beitrag zum Stellenwert der Medizin am Hof Karls des Großen und zum Problem der karolingischen „Hofschule“. In: Würzburger medizinhistorische Mitteilungen 11, 1993, S. 175–203, insbesondere S. 191–199 (Das „Lorscher Arzneibuch“).
- Bernhard Bischoff: Katalog der festländischen Handschriften des neunten Jahrhunderts (mit Ausnahme der wisigotischen). Teil 1: Aachen – Lambach. Harrassowitz, Wiesbaden 1998, S. 50, Nr. 223.
- Rolf Bergmann, Stefanie Stricker: Katalog der althochdeutschen und altsächsischen Glossenhandschriften. Band 1. De Gruyter, Berlin / New York 2005, S. 172–174.
- Rolf Bergmann: Lorscher Glossenhandschriften. In: Rolf Bergmann, Stefanie Stricker (Hrsg.): Die althochdeutsche und altsächsische Glossographie. Ein Handbuch. Band 2. De Gruyter, Berlin / New York 2009, S. 1301–1305, hier S. 1302.
- Klaus-Dietrich Fischer: Das ‚Lorscher Arzneibuch‘ im Widerstreit der Meinungen. In: Medizinhistorisches Journal 45, 2010, S. 165–188 (PDF; 511 kB).
- Franz Daxecker: Augenerkrankungen im Lorscher Arzneibuch. In: Mitteilungen der Julius Hirschberg Gesellschaft zur Geschichte der Augenheilkunde 16, 2014, S. 321–335.
- Werner Taegert: Ausgezeichnete Handschrift aus Kaisers Hand. Das „Lorscher Arzneibuch“ der Staatsbibliothek Bamberg im UNESCO-Register „Memory of the World“. In: Bibliotheksforum Bayern [N.F.] 9, 2015, Nr. 1, S. 39–43 (PDF; 846 kB).
- Werner Taegert: Frühestes Dokument der Klostermedizin aus dem abendländischen Frühmittelalter. Das ‚Lorscher Arzneibuch‘ der Staatsbibliothek Bamberg im UNESCO-Register „Memory of the World“. In: Bamberger Medizingeschichten. Medizingeschichtlicher Rundweg durch Bamberg. Herausgegeben vom Ärztlichen Kreisverband Bamberg. Heinrichs-Verlag, 1. Auflage. Bamberg 2020, S. 10–23 und 168–172.
- Digitisation of the manuscript Msc.Med.1 (with German translation and transcription) in the Kaiser-Heinrich-Bibliothek of the Staatsbibliothek Bamberg
- Digitisation of the manuscript Msc.Med.1 (mit wissenschaftlicher Beschreibung) in the Bibliotheca Laureshamensis – digital
- Entry in the Handschriftencensus
- Adelheid Platte: Das Lorscher Arzneibuch entstand zur Zeit Karls des Großen, Landesamt für Denkmalpflege Hessen
- Adelheid Platte, Hermann Schefers: Lorscher Arzneibuch, Kloster Lorsch
- Veröffentlichungen zum Lorscher Arzneibuch im Opac der Regesta Imperii
