= Max Manitius =

German medievalist (1858–1933)

Max Manitius (23 March 1858 - 21 September 1933) was a German medievalist and Latin scholar.

== Life and work ==
Max Manitius, son of the Court Councillor and secretary in the Saxon Ministry of Justice Wilhelm Manitius (1808-1885), attended the Gymnasium in Leipzig and then studied history and antiquities at the University of Leipzig from 1877. In 1881 he received his doctorate from Wilhelm Arndt with a thesis on the Carolingian imperial annals, which dealt with the Annales Bertiniani, the Annales Laurissenses minores and the Annales Fuldenses. From 1883 to 1884 he was for a short time an "unskilled worker" (at that time a common term for scientific staff) at the Monumenta Germaniae Historica (MGH), where he supported Ernst Dümmler in the edition of the second MGH Poetae volume. In 1884 he started working as a teacher at the Noldensian Higher School for Girls in Dresden, which gave him enough time for further medieval research, with which he soon made a living. Still in 1884 he published a critical edition of an anonymous 9th century geographical writing, De situ orbis.

In 1889 Manitius published a complete representation of the 10th and 11th centuries under the title German History under the Saxon and Salian Emperors (911-1125). His special interest in the Christian-Latin poetry of the early Middle Ages culminated in 1891 in his literary-historical History of Christian-Latin poetry up to the middle of the 8th century. Manitius also published annotated translations of selected Latin poems, such as Archipoeta (1913), and in 1925 published a wide-ranging study of education, science and literature in the Occident from 800 to 1100.

Manitius owes its special and lasting significance in Medieval Studies and Medieval Latin Philology to its more than 2,800-page history of medieval Latin literature, which was published in three volumes in 1911, 1923 and 1931 as part of Section IX of the Handbuch der Altertumswissenschaft (Handbook of Classical Studies) and is the only volume of the company not to have been revised since then. The Munich philologist and MGH central director Ludwig Traube († 1907) had originally been engaged to prepare this volume, but he had allowed himself to be released from his contract and instead recommended Manitius to private scholars. The lasting value of Manitius' detailed and detailed presentation is based on his ability to describe even complicated facts in a way that can be understood by all.

His last major work Manuscripts of ancient authors in medieval library catalogues was published posthumously in 1935 by his son Karl Manitius (1899-1979), who was also a medieval historian and philologist and worked as a freelancer for the MGH after 1949.

The estate of Max Manitius is now in the archives of the Monumenta Germaniae Historica.
