= Siege of Laon (741) =

Frankish siege during the civil war of 741

Date	741
Location	Laon, Neustria
Result	Frankish victory

Belligerents
Francia	Grifo

Commanders and leaders
Carloman; Pepin the Short	Grifo (POW)

The siege of Laon was a Frankish siege of the rebel Grifo's fortified city of Laon in 741. The Frankish army under the Mayors of the Palace, the brothers Carloman and Pepin the Short, besieged the fortress and took Grifo, the Mayors' half-brother, captive.

== Prelude ==
The Frankish Mayor of the Palace Charles Martel died on 22 October 741. He was survived by three heirs, Carloman, Pepin the Short and Grifo, the latter the son of Charles Martel's second queen, the Bavarian Swanachild. Grifo was encouraged by Swanachild to take control of the entire kingdom. Grifo occupied the city of Laon and declared war on his brothers.

== Siege ==
Carloman and Pepin mobilized an army, advanced on Laon and captured it after a siege. Grifo was taken prisoner.

== Aftermath ==
The brothers went on to recover provinces that had broken away after Charles' death. Carloman imprisoned Grifo in Neufchâteau in the Ardennes to prevent further revolts at home while the brothers waged war abroad.

== Bibliography ==
- Petersen, Leif Inge Ree (2013). Siege Warfare and Military Organization in the Successor States (400-800 AD): Byzantium, the West and Islam. Leiden: Brill Publishers. ISBN 978-90-04-25199-1.
- Royal Frankish Annals (1970). Royal Frankish Annals and Nithard's Histories. Translated by Scholz, B.W. Ann Arbor: University of Michigan Press. ISBN 0-472-06186-0.
