= Fragmentum chesnii =

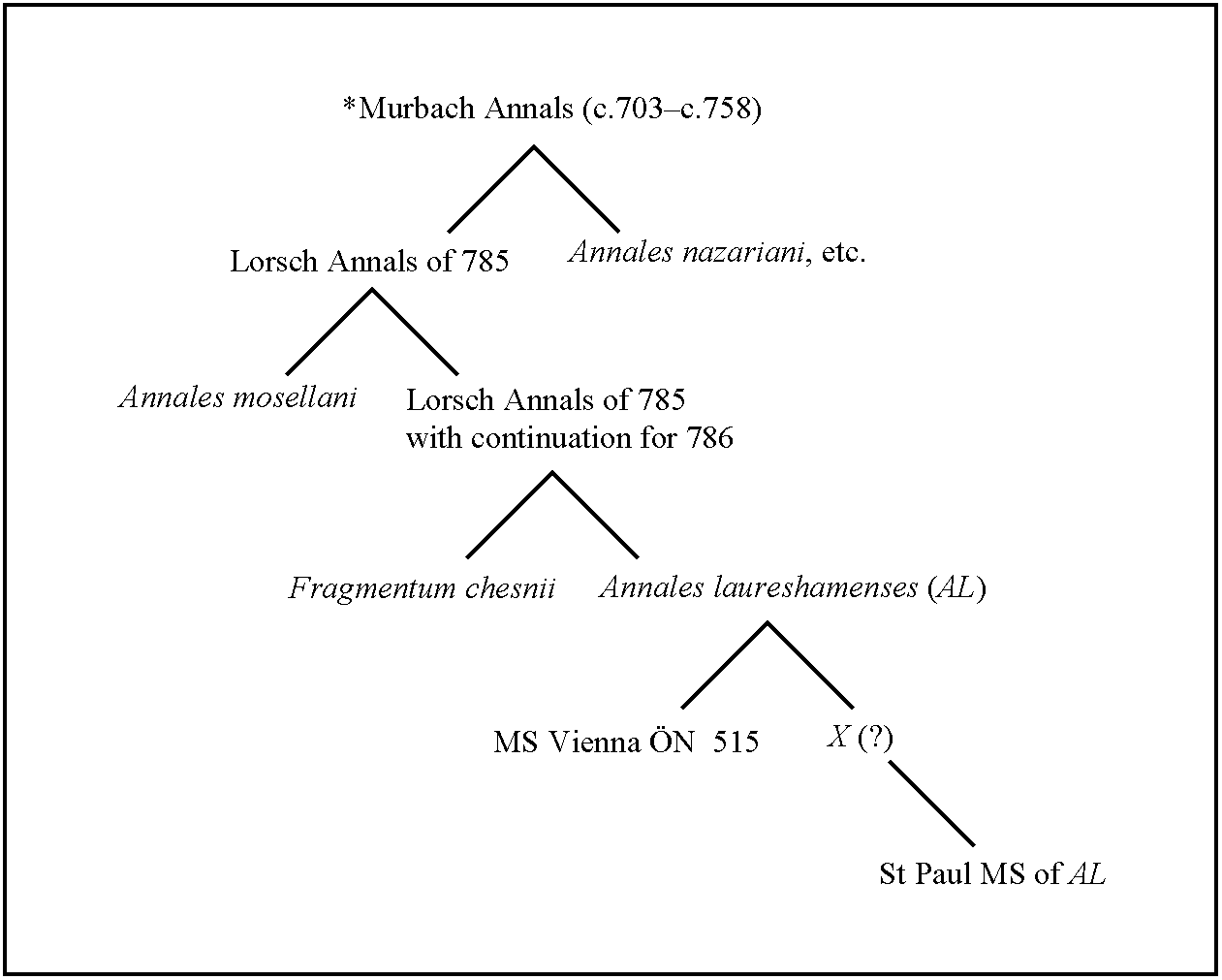
How the Fragmentum fits into the textual transmission of the Annales laureshamenses (Collins 2005, 59, fig. 4).

The Fragmentum (annalium) chesnii or chesnianum, sometimes called the Annales Laureshamenses antiquiores, is a brief set of Reichsannalen describing the history of Francia during the years 768 to 790. It is named after André Duchesne (Andreas Chesneus), who first edited and published it in his book Historiae Francorum scriptores (1:21–23) in 1636. It has been re-edited by Georg Heinrich Pertz for the Monumenta Germaniae Historica, Scriptores I, 30–34 (Hanover: 1826).

For the years up to 785, the Fragmentum is textually almost identical to the Annales laureshamenses (AL) and the Annales mosellani (AM). With a manuscript of the former (from Sankt-Paul) it shares an identical entry for the first half of the year 786. This indicates the existence of a stem text from which all three sets of annals derive (the "Lorsch Annals of 785") and the existence of a brief continuation of this text that was not used by the compiler of the AM but which bequeathed a short entry for 786 to both the Fragmentum and the AL, which diverge completely after that. The major divergence of the texts before the year 786 is in the mention of events related to the Abbey of Lorsch, which were probably found in the exemplar (the "Lorsch Annals of 785") and retained in the AL, but have all been excised from the Fragmentum (which was probably not compiled at Lorsch). The Fragmentum is generally briefer than the AL.

The Fragmentum is found between the Chronicle of Fredegar and a section of the Annales regni francorum (years 791–806) in a late ninth- or tenth-century manuscript from Reims, now in the Bibliotheca Apostolica Vaticana (MS Reg. Lat. 213, fols. 149–51). In the manuscript there is no division between the Fragmentum and the Annales regni francorum, which picks up where the former leaves off. It has been hypothesised that the multiplication of distinct annalistic traditions in the 780s was sponsored by Charlemagne as part of a wider programme of cultural/educational renewal. This would explain the divergence of the Fragmentum and the AL in 786. Likewise the abrupt end of various annals in the 790s may be explained by the centralisation of the historiography in the "authorised" Annales regni francorum around that time (or by 807/8 at the latest).
