= Annales mosellani =

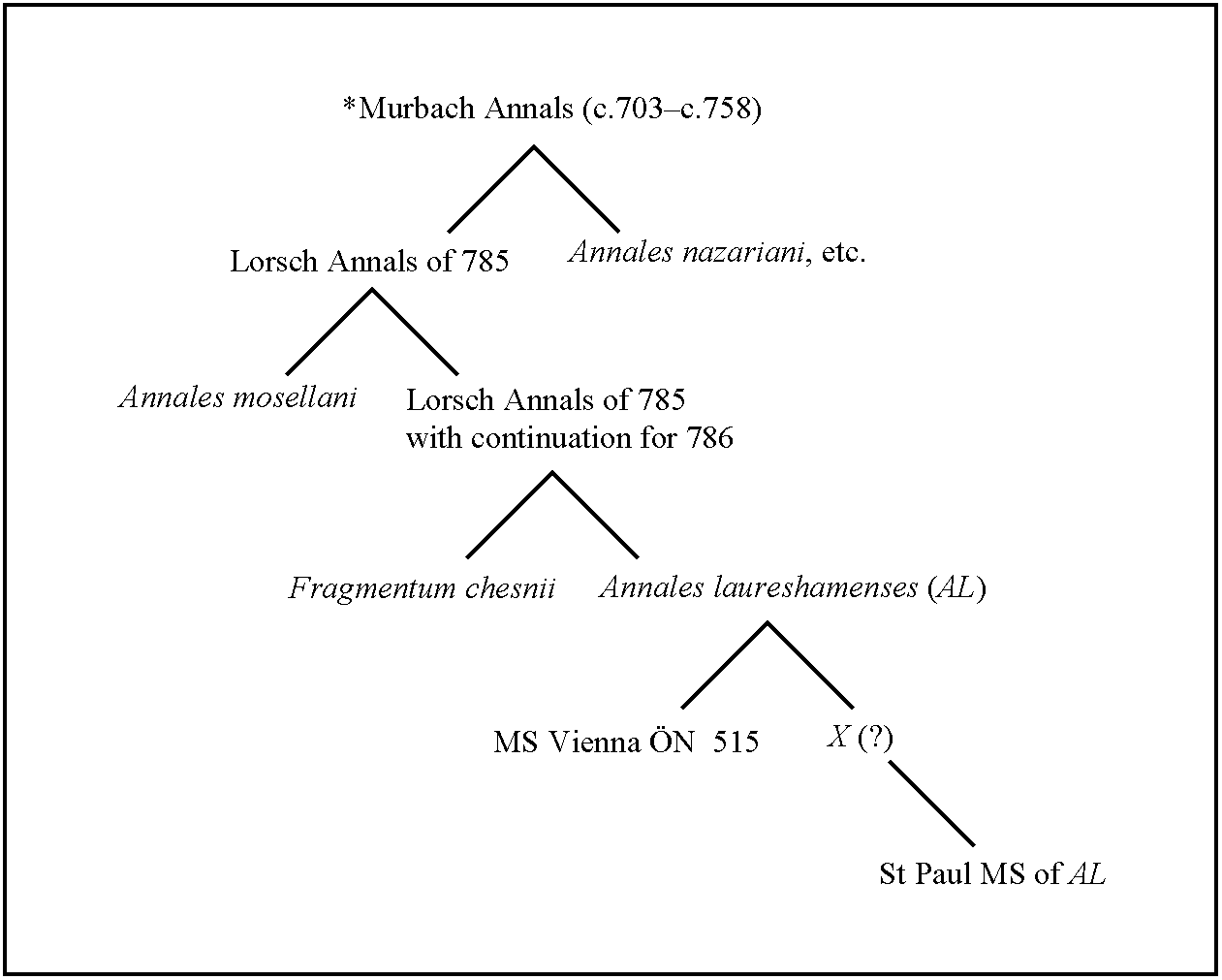
How the Annales mosellani fit into the textual history of the Annales laureshamenses.

The Annales mosellani or mosellenses (AM) or Moselle Annals are a set of minor Reichsannalen (annals of the Carolingian Empire) covering the years 703 to 798. Its entries are brief and unliterary, but broad in scope and generally accurate. They have only partially been translated into English.

J. M. Lappenberg discovered the Annales in a manuscript of the National Library of Russia in Saint Petersburg, and produced the editio princeps (first edition) in 1869 for the Monumenta Germaniae Historica. His analysis placed their composition in the monasteries of the upper Moselle basin (like Metz and Gorze), to which they constantly refer and after which he named them. Later, Wilhelm von Giesebrecht suggested they were written by the Hiberno-Scottish monastic community established by Pepin of Heristal at Saint Martin's in Cologne. A marginal reference to the Domesday Book (1086) on folio 81 seals the era of composition of the manuscript, which preserves the only known copy of the annals, to the late eleventh or early twelfth century in northern France.

Textually, the years up to and including 785 are identical in the Annales mosellani, the Annales laureshamenses (which also begins in 703), and the Fragmentum chesnii (which only begins in 768). The first half of the entry for 786 is identical in the Annales laureshamenses and the Fragmentum but is missing from the Annales mosellani, which lack any entry for that year. Consequently, all subsequent entries are mis-dated by a year (e.g., events that occurred in 798 are dated to 797, the year the Annales presumes to end). Probably all three annalistic compilations derive from a single exemplar created at the Abbey of Lorsch in 785, though the Annales laureshamenses and the Fragmentum may have been copied from an intermediate version containing a brief extension to 786. On the other hand, Heinrich Fichtenau believed the Annales mosellani depended on the Annales laureshamenses.

The Annales mosellani are not restricted in their coverage to the Carolingian Empire. Under the year 713 there is a reference to mors Alflidae et Halidulfi regis, the deaths of Ælflæd, Abbess of Whitby, and Aldwulf, King of East Anglia. This notice is also contained in the Annales laureshamenses, Annales alemannici, Annales nazariani, and Annales guelferbytani, and these are the only sources for the date of Aldwulf's death. It is possible that the abbey of Whitby had disseminated news of their deaths, and that Aldwulf's mother, Hereswith, living her retirement in the Abbey of Chelles, received the news in Francia.
