= Chronicle of Moissac =

Start of the chronicle, here entitled LIBER CRONICORUM BEDANI PRESBYTERI (Book of the Chronicles of Bede the Priest)

The Chronicle of Moissac (also known as Chronicon Moissiacense) is an anonymous compilation that was discovered in the abbey of Moissac, but is now thought to have been compiled in the Catalan monastery of Ripoll in the end of the tenth century. Like most chronicles, it begins with Adam, but gains increasing interest for historians as it nears its end date of 828. Unfortunately, a folio with the entries covering the years 716–770 is missing. The only surviving manuscript of the Chronicle of Moissac dates from the later 11th century and is now in the French National Library in Paris (Cod. Paris. lat. 4886).

The base text of the chronicle is the Universal Chronicle of 741, itself a continuation of the Major Chronicle of Bede. For his continuation, the compiler seems to have used early annals that had been compiled in southwest Francia, otherwise untraced, which contribute as primary sources for the career of Charlemagne and the military, political and ecclesiastical history of his times. As the Annals of Aniane made use of the same lost source, they are sometimes used to fill in the Chronicle of Moissac for its lost years.

== See also ==
- Reichsannalen

== Sources ==
- Collins, Roger (1998). Charlemagne. Toronto: University of Toronto Press. ISBN 978-080204416-7.
