= Richbod =

Frankish monk and prelate

- Born: Unknown
- Died: October 1, 804; Trier, buried in the abbey at Lorsch
- Other names: Richbodus, 'Macarius'
- Occupations: Abbot, Archbishop
- Known for: Student of Alcuin, Advisor to Charlemagne, and help draw up a response to the adoptionist heresy of Felix of Urgel.

Richbod was a Frankish monk and prelate who was the Abbot of Lorsch from 784 and Abbot of Mettlach and Archbishop of Trier from around 792, holding all three of these positions concurrently. He is first documented as a monk in the Lorsch monastery, where he worked as a document clerk. After, he would be noticed and picked up as a student of Alcuin at the court of Charlemagne. Whilst under king he would rise to role of advisor and be awarded the titles of:

== Richbod's Love of Vergil ==
In the court's inner circle, where the learned assumed ancient names associated with wise men, he was Macarius. He was regarded as a man wise before God and popular with men. According to Alcuin, he was a great admirer of Vergil, whose Aeneid he was reputed to know better than the Gospels.

In the recovered 'Letters of Alcuin' we see that the teacher would try and contact his student often however, Richbod would rarely reply:

"Lo, a whole year has passed," he writes, "and I have had no letter from you. Ah, if only my name were Vergil, then wouldst thou never forget me, but have my face ever before thee; then should I be 'felix nimium, quo non felicior ullus.' And," he concludes, "would that the four Gospels rather than the twelve Aeneids filled your heart."

The idea of Richbod showing clear preference towards Vergil over the Gospel or even his friends, was a controversial point as the stories of the Aeneid revolved around pagan gods and unsophisticated cultures (according to the Franks). This gave the impression that sympathising with the works of Vergil would be like sympathising with the pagans and barbarians, which was a very heretical accusation.

It is also plausible that Richbod would contribute to the schools in Trier and in the court with this vast knowledge of Greek and Latin classics.

== Involvement with the Lorsch Annals ==
Richbod's involvement with the 'Annales Laureshamenses' is disputed, as his name is never directly attributed to the Annals, however historians award him with writing this source for a number of reasons. First of all, the Annals would have specific details on Duke Tassilo III's exile that would only be privy to council members:

"[...]The Reviser could not risk a remark that might jeopardize its validity. The wisdom of his reticence is validated by the Lorsch Annals, written under Archbishop Richbod, undoubtedly a participant at Frankfurt, which contain the only independent reference to Tassilo at the great council [...]"

Another point would be the fact that the Lorsch Annals would be written by a person who was used to the customs and works of the Carolingian Court which is reflected in the source. An interesting point about these specific Annals would be that the Latin used with have a number of errors, something that may have occurred if Richbod had commissioned the Lorsch Annals to be written by a scribe(s).

"[...] the author of the AL ad a. 8oo-8o1 fashioned the text of the annals not only on the basis of his own familiarity with the formulaic phraseology of the Frankish placitum, but also on the basis of 'official protocols' that were accessible to him for his report on the Roman Synod of December 800 and on the negotiations leading to the coronation of Charlemagne on December 25 [...]"

Unfortunately, another coincidence that may link Richbod to the Lorsch Annals would be that the Annals finish in the year 803, less than a year before his untimely death in October 804. If we are to assume his death may have been to old age or illness, it would explain why he could no longer help with the creation of his project.

=== Other Key Points ===
- In 798, he drew up a response to the adoptionist heresy of Felix of Urgel.
- Other than this, his actions as archbishop are obscure. In Lorsch, however, he transferred the dormitory from the north to the south and surrounded it with a wall. Furthermore, he surrounded the tomb of Saint Nazarius with a gold and silver lattice and a colourful new marble floor.

=== Death ===
He died in Trier and was buried in the abbey at Lorsch.

== Sources ==
- Chronicon Laureshamense. Mon. Germ. hist. Ss. 21, 352
- Epistolae Alcuini. Bibliotheca rer. Germ. VI. Jaffé. epp. 13
- Haarländer, Stephanie, "Ricbod" in: Neue Deutsche Biographie 21 (2003), p. 502 [online version]; URL: https://www.deutsche-biographie.de/pnd103115188.html
- Hammer, Carl I. (2008). ""PIPINUS REX": PIPPIN'S PLOT OF 792 AND BAVARIA". Traditio. 63: 235–276. ISSN 0362-1529.
- Page, Rolph Barlow, "Letters of Alcuin" (1909), p. 73-75; URL: https://archive.org/details/lettersofalcuin00pagerich/page/74/mode/2up?q=richbod
- Story, Joanna (2012). "Bede, Willibrord and the Letters of Pope Honorius I on the Genesis of the Archbishopric of York". The English Historical Review. 127 (527): 783–818. ISSN 0013-8266.
- Wallach, Luitpold (1956). "The Roman Synod of December 800 and the Alleged Trial of Leo III: A Theory and the Historical Facts". The Harvard Theological Review. 49 (2): 123–142. ISSN 0017-8160.
