= Annales Petaviani =

The Annales Petaviani (AP) is one of the so-called "minor annals group", three related Reichsannalen, year-by-year histories of the Carolingian Empire composed in Latin. They are named after the former owner of the manuscript, the French Jesuit Denis Pétau (1583–1652), whose name, in Latin, is Dionysius Petavius. The standard critical edition of the Annales is that of Georg Pertz in the Monumenta Germaniae Historica.

The first entry in the Annales Petaviani is for the year 687 and records the Battle of Tertry. There is then a gap until 708, when the annals begin again and continue to 799 in chronological order. Those entries through to 771 were compiled from earlier annals, such as the Annales sancti Amandi and the Annales mosellani, and do not comprise an independent source. Together with the Annales sancti Amandi, the Annales Petaviani are the primary source of the entries for 741–88 in the Annales laurissenses maiores. Both of these may have been based on an earlier exemplar originally compiled contemporaneously with events at the convent of Sankt Martin in Cologne. For the years 771–99 the Annales Petaviani are an independent and contemporary source.

They are the only source to date Charlemagne's birth to 747. They are also the only source to name either of Carloman I's two known sons, who fled to Italy with his widow in 771. The one born towards 770, whom Pope Stephen III offered to baptise himself, was named Pepin. Carloman's widow, Gisela, is also named in only one source: the Annales mettenses priores. The Annales Petaviani also provide a unique explanation for the retirement of Carloman's uncle and namesake, Carloman, son of Charles Martel, who entered the Abbey of Montecassino in 747, leaving power in the hands of his brother, Pepin the Short. The Annales claim that Carloman's conversion to the religious life came about because his conscience was unsettled by his defeat in Alemannia, where he lost thousands of men: Karolomannus intravit Alamanniam ubi fertur quod multa hominum millia ceciderit. Unde compunctus regnum reliquit ("Carloman entered Alemannia where it is said that many thousands of men died. In remorse he relinquished the kingdom"). The Annales also provide evidence of an Anglo-Saxon presence in Marseille, the great seaport of Merovingian Gaul, when they note under the year 790 the death of the son of Botto, an English negotiator in Marseille.

== Editions ==
- Pertz, G. H. (1829). "Annales Petaviani". Monumenta Germaniae Historica, Scriptores. Vol. 1. Hanover. pp. 7–19.
