= Annales laureshamenses =

Page from the Sankt-Paul manuscript of the Annales laureshamenses, containing the year 775 (starting mid-page with Roman numeral DCCLXXV).

The Annales laureshamenses, also called Annals of Lorsch (AL), are a set of Reichsannalen (annals of the Frankish empire) that cover the years from 703 to 803, with a brief prologue. The annals begin where the "Chronica minora" (Note: The "Chronica" is a section of Bede's De temporibus.) of the Anglo-Saxon historian Bede leaves off—in the fifth year of the Emperor Tiberios III—and may have originally been composed as a continuation of Bede. The annals for the years up to 785 were written at the Abbey of Lorsch (whence the name), but are dependent on earlier sources. Those for the years from 785 onward form an independent source and provide especially important coverage of the imperial coronation of Charlemagne in 800. The Annales laureshamenses have been translated into English.

== Manuscript history ==
An eight-leaf copy of the Lorsch annals for 703–803 was produced probably in 835 by a single scribe. The "Sankt-Paul codex", as it is now called, which is the sole surviving quire of an otherwise lost manuscript, was still in the library of Sankt-Blasien in 1790, when it was edited by Aemilianus Ussermanns, bishop of Bamberg, in his collection of documents illustrative of "Alemannian" German history, Germaniae sacrae prodomus seu collectio monumentorum res Alemannicas illustrantium. In 1809, as a result of the Napoleonic Wars, the monks of Sankt-Blasien moved, with their library, to the Abbey of Sankt-Paul im Lavanttal. In 1820 G. H. Pertz sought the manuscript for the Monumenta Germaniae Historica, but it could not be found and so the MGH version was based on Ussermann's printed edition of 1790. The manuscript was recovered by 1889, when Eberhard Katz edited a new version. Katz described the codex (today lost again), dated it to the ninth century and suggested it originated at the Abbey of Reichenau because of a marginal notice of the burial of Charlemagne's brother-in-law Gerold of Anglachgau there.

A fragment of a manuscript conserved in Vienna (now no. 515 in the Österreichische Nationalbibliothek) also contains a section of the Lorsch annals for mid-794 to 803, and was copied around 803. (Note: The fragment comprises eight leaves, but only the first five contain the annals. The bottom half of folio 5r was originally left blank, perhaps for the continuation of the annals, but was filled with Old High German poetry in the late tenth century. Folio 5v contains some later liturgical pieces.) This manuscript too appears to originate at Reichenau, as it is written in Alemannian script. It was discovered in Vienna in 1551 by Wolfgang Lazius. Katz argued that both the Vienna fragment and the Sankt-Paul codex are derived from an earlier exemplar. Though the Sankt-Paul codex is later, it is not a copy of the Vienna, since it contains errors that must originate in some other exemplar. There is an ongoing debate whether the Vienna fragment represents the original copy of the annalist, who was probably from the region of Alemannia. Four distinct scribal hands have been identified in the Vienna fragment, corresponding to different entries: (Note: The identification of the hands was made by Franz Unterkircher. Only scribe A is undisputed, because of his use of a rare pre-Caroline form for the letter "a".)

- A (fol. 1r, fol. 1v l. 18 to 2v l. 13): 794 (fragment), second half of 795, all of 796–97
- B (fol. 1v ll. 1–18, fol. 2v l. 14 to 3r l. 1): first half of 795
- C (fol. 3r l. 2 to 4r l. 17): all of 799–801
- D (fol. 4r l. 18 to 5r l. 10): all of 802–3

The post-785 annals in the Sankt-Paul and Vienna manuscripts do not show any special connexions with Lorsch and were probably composed elsewhere. They may have been written nearly continuously from 785, or in spurts with months or years between additions.

== Textual transmission ==
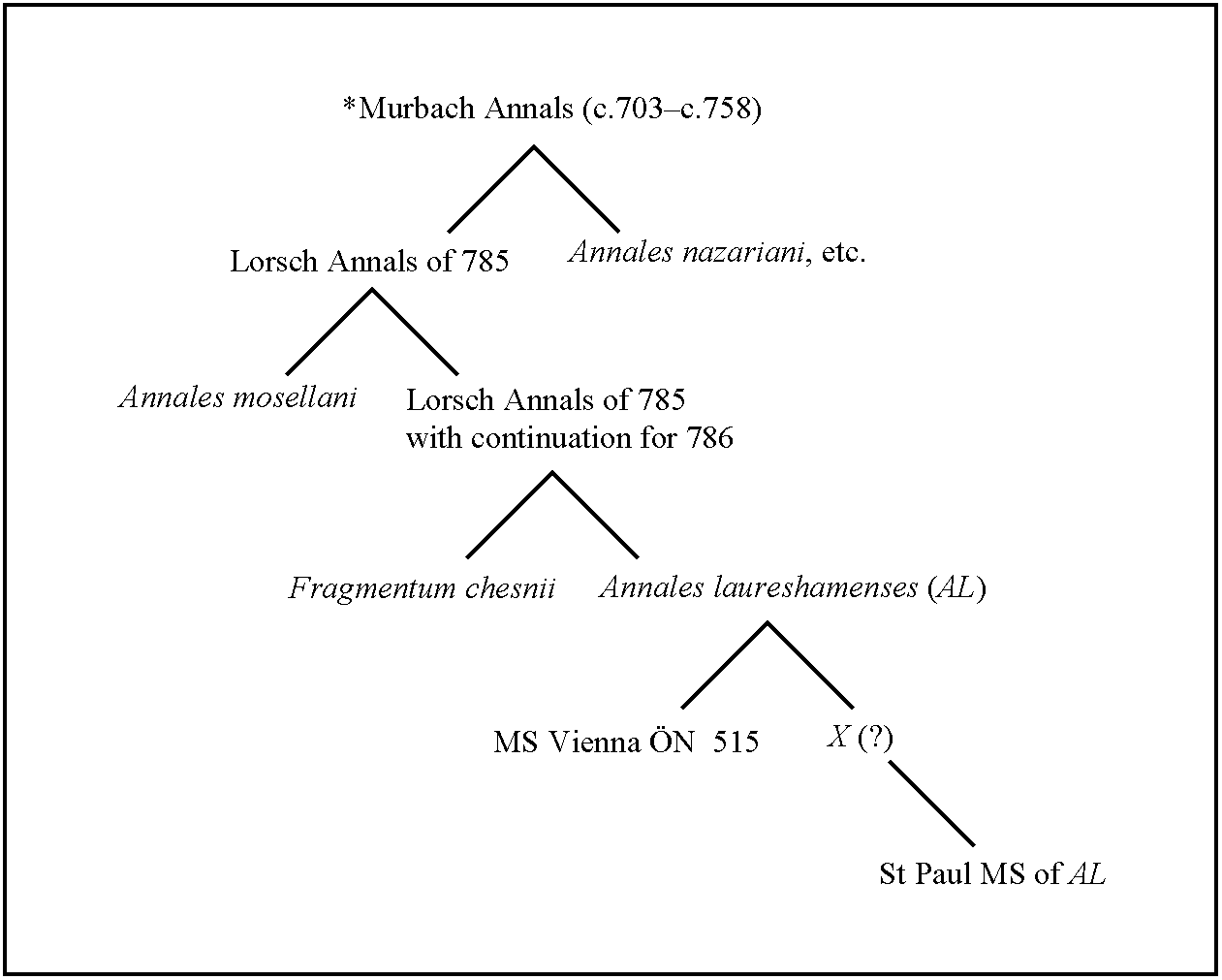
Chart of the textual history of the Annales laureshamenses.

The Lorsch annals for the years up to 785 are almost identical with the Annales mosellani (Note: Probably written in the Moselle basin, the Annales mosellani cover the years 703 to 798. A reference on folio 81 to the Domesday Book (1086) seals the era of composition of the single surviving north French manuscript of these annals to the late eleventh or early twelfth century.) and also with those of the Fragmentum chesnii, (Note: The Fragmentum chesnii or chesnianum, sometimes called the Annales Laureshamenses antiquiores, comprises a set of annals of the years 768 to 790, found between the Chronicle of Fredegar and the Annales regni francorum in a late ninth- or tenth-century manuscript from Reims. Named after André Duchesne, who edited it in his Historiae Francorum scriptores, 1:21–23 (1636).) which also shares with the Sankt-Paul version a brief extension to the year 786. From the year 785, the Lorsch annals being dating events since the death of Gregory the Great (605). The 785 entry contains a reference to the "present", indicating perhaps that the original compilation of annals 703–785 was made in the latter year. The annals for 785–803 were compiled independently and not necessarily at Lorsch.

This original stem—the Lorsch Annals of 785—from which all three annalistic traditions diverge after 785 was probably composed at the Abbey of Lorsch. Textually it is related to the Annales nazariani, Annales guelferbytani, and Annales alamannici, all depending on the earlier, hypothetical "Murbach Annals", composed at Murbach Abbey (founded 727) and covering the years up to 751. Since the Lorsch annals of 785 were based on an erroneous copy of these Murbach annals, events in the 750s are consistently mis-dated. The frequency of references to the abbey of Lorsch between the years 764 and 785 suggests that the work of compilation done in 785 was performed there. The Abbey of Gorze is also mentioned, but less frequently, and the death of only one of its abbots is mentioned, whereas all the Lorsch abbots of the period receive obituaries. (Note: The city of Worms is also mentioned frequently, further suggestive of an origin in the middle Rhineland.) These Lorsch annals may have been circulated in batches of years, before they were completed. The nature of the Sankt-Paul codex supports the contention that unfinished batches of annals were circulated in libelli (booklets) comprising single quires.

A copy of the Lorsch annals eventually found its way into the Marca Hispanica, where it was used by the compiler(s) of the Chronicle of Moissac. The Belgian historian François-Louis Ganshof believed that the Chronicle of Moissac represented a fuller version of the Lorsch annals that had been extended down to 818. More likely, the years 803–18 in the Moissac chronicle are derived from another source with a different geographic focus.

The so-called "Northern Annals" that cover the years 732 to 802, and which comprise a section of the Historia regum of Simeon of Durham, contain a reference to the golden lettering of the poetic epitaph on the marble memorial Charlemagne provided to commemorate Pope Hadrian I. This may have been derived from the Lorsch annals, which are the only continental source to provide the detail.

== Authorship and viewpoint ==
Heinrich Fichtenau argued that the author of the Lorsch annals was Richbod, a pupil of Alcuin of York and a member of Charlemagne's court circle until about 784. From 785 he was the abbot of Lorsch and from 791 the bishop of Trier. He died in 804. Knowledge of the Council of Frankfurt, which Richbod attended in 794 and which condemned adoptionism in the same terms as a treatise of Alcuin's, is displayed in the annals under that year. There is no evidence, however, that the annals that best correspond to Richbod's abbacy in fact originate from Lorsch, and so they can provide little support for Fichtenau's attribution.

The text of the oldest manuscript of the Annales regni francorum, discovered at Lorsch and long kept in the Bavarian ducal library, closely resemble the Lorsch annals for the years 789–93. The year entries unique to the Annales laureshamenses may have been written in 803 as a single coherent narrative in annal form as a response to the "slant" of the Annales regni francorum. The Lorsch annals for the years from 799 to 801 demonstrate its own slant in stressing the legitimacy of Charlemagne's imperial title. The Lorsch annalist argues that the absence of the nomen imperatoris (name of the emperor) in 800 and the femineum imperium (female empire) of the Byzantines at the time justified the Pope in granting the imperial title to Charlemagne, who already held Rome, the imperial capital, and all the imperial cities in Gallia, Germania, and Italia. In that context, Collins has pointed out the differences between accounts of Charlemagne's imperial coronation in the Annales laureshamenses and the Annales regni francorum.

== Contents ==
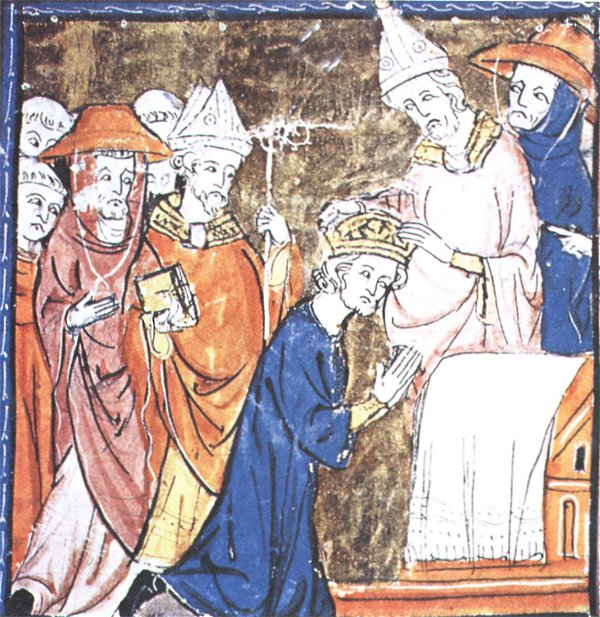
Pope Leo crowning Charlemagne, from the Grandes Chroniques de France (1375–1379).

The most complete version of the Annales laureshamenses, from the library at Sankt-Paul, is a universal history that begins with a preface describing its dating scheme, adopted from Orosius' Seven Books of History Against the Pagans and counts 5,199 years from Creation to the Nativity. The anno Domini system is used to date events. The first sixty-five years (703–767) are described in a prose narrative that is not divided into single-year entries. Beginning with the year 768 the work is divided into chapters (1 to 36) and each entry receives a separate line. The manuscript also contains a calendar from 777 to 835 (folios 5r–7r) for the dating of Easter, using the unusual 19-year cycles of Theophilus of Alexandria. This calendar suggests the manuscript may have originated before 835.

Significantly, the Lorsch annals are the only primary source to contradict the statement of Einhard that Charlemagne was ignorant of Pope Leo III's intention to crown him Emperor on 25 December 800. Rather the Lorsch annals state that the idea was discussed at an assembly held in Rome after Charlemagne's arrival (24 November), probably beginning on 30 November or 1 December. This entry was drawn up only after Charlemagne's return to Francia in 801, since an entry under 799 reports how the conspirators who overthrew Leo in April that year were then in exile. (Note: The Lorsch annals also contradict Einhard in claiming that Leo was not blinded as the conspirators had originally intended.) They were only finally exiled early in 801. This entry has, however, generated as much controversy as Einhard's statement of Charlemagne's ignorance. While Ganshof argued that the Annales were more trustworthy than Einhard, others have argued that Charlemagne's policy towards the Byzantine empire both before and after 800 shows little support for the pope's initiative. What Einhard shows Charlemagne objecting to is the Roman imperial title, not necessarily equality with the Byzantine emperors; thus the emphasis the Annales laureshamenses place on justifying the "name of the emperor".

In the Lorsch annals, the year 802 ends with the arrival of the elephant Abul-Abbas at Charlemagne's court. The year 803 is recounted briefly: Charlemagne held Easter at Aachen, held an assembly at Mainz, and did not go on campaign all year. And there the annals end.

== Sources ==
- Collins, Roger (2005). "Charlemagne's Imperial Coronation and the Annals of Lorsch". Charlemagne: Empire and Society. Manchester: Manchester University Press. pp. 52–70.
- Katz, Eberhard (1889). "Annalium Laureshamensium editio emendata secundum codicem St. Paulensem". Jahresbericht des öffentlischen Stifts-Untergymnasiums der Benedictiner zu St. Paul: 3–63.
- King, Paul David, ed. (1987). Charlemagne: Translated Sources. Lambrigg, Kendal: King.
- McKitterick, Rosamond (2000). "The Illusion of Royal Power in the Carolingian Annals". English Historical Review. 115 (460): 1–20.
- McKitterick, Rosamond (2004). History and Memory in the Carolingian World. Cambridge: Cambridge University Press.
- Pertz, Georgius Heinricus, ed. (1826). "Annales Laureshamenses, Alamannici, Guelferbytani et Nazariani". Monumenta Germaniae Historica: Scriptores. Vol. 1. Hannoverae: Impensis Bibliopolii Aulici Hahniani. pp. 19–39.
