= Carloman (mayor of the palace) =

8th-century Frankish ruler

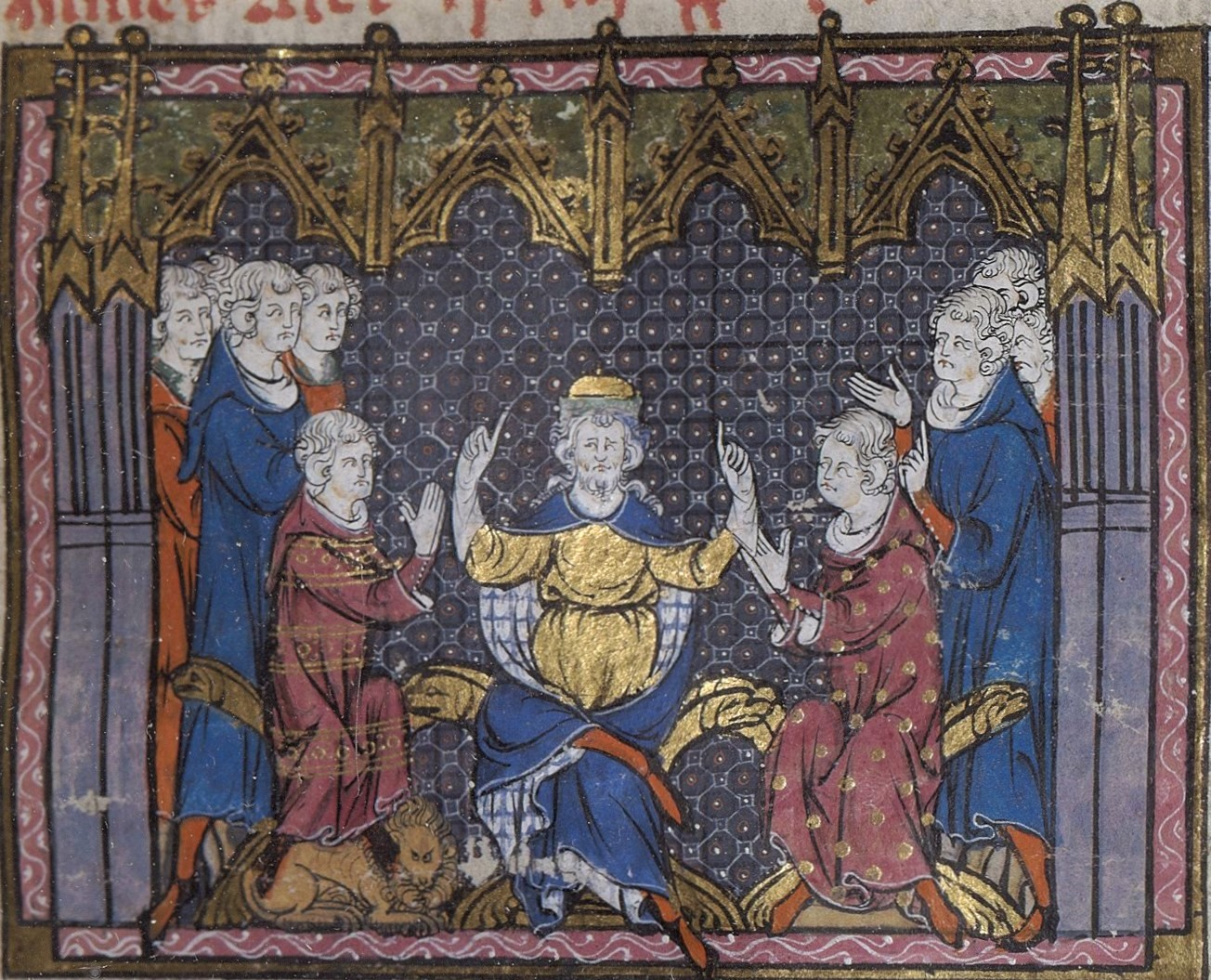
- Charles Martel divides the realm between Pepin and Carloman (On the right).

Mayor of the Palace of Austrasia
- Reign: 741–747
- Predecessor: Charles Martel
- Successor: Pepin the Short
- Born: c. 713
- Died: 17 July or 17 August 754 (aged 40-41); Vienne, Isère
- Burial: Abbey of Monte Cassino
- Issue: Drogo, (possibly) Rotrude, Countess of Paris

Carloman (between 706 and 716 (Note: There is some discrepancy between the sources on his year of birth. It is given variously as 706, 708, 714, or 716.) – 17 August (Note: There is some discrepancy between the sources on his date of death. It is the 17 of either August or July.) 754) was the eldest son of Charles Martel, mayor of the palace and duke of the Franks, and his wife Chrotrud of Treves. On Charles's death (741), Carloman and his brother Pepin the Short succeeded to their father's legal positions, Carloman in Austrasia, and Pepin in Neustria. He was a member of the family later called the Carolingians and it can be argued that he was instrumental in consolidating their power at the expense of the ruling Merovingian kings of the Franks. He withdrew from public life in 747 to take up the monastic habit, "the first of a new type of saintly king", according to Norman Cantor, "more interested in religious devotion than royal power, who frequently appeared in the following three centuries and who was an indication of the growing impact of Christian piety on Germanic society".

== Assumption of power ==
After the death of Charles Martel, power was not divided to include Carloman's half-brother Grifo, Charles's son by his second wife Swanachild. This was per Charles' wishes; although Grifo demanded a portion of the realm, his brothers refused him. In 741, Carloman and Pepin besieged Grifo in Laon, took him captive and forced him into a monastery. Each brother turned his attention towards his own area of influence as mayor of the Palace, Pepin in the West (in what was called Neustria, roughly the area between Nancy and Rennes) and Carloman in the East (in what was called Austrasia, roughly the area between Bruges, Metz and Fulda), which was the Carolingian base of power.

With Grifo contained, the two mayors, who had not yet proved themselves in battle in defence of the realm as their father had, on the initiative of Carloman, installed the Merovingian Childeric III as king (743), even though Martel had left the throne vacant since the death of Theuderic IV in 737.

Unlike most medieval instances of fraternal power sharing, Carloman and Pepin for seven years seemed at least willing to work together; certainly, they undertook many military actions together. Carloman joined Pepin against Hunald I of Aquitaine's rising in 742 and again in 745. Pepin assisted Carloman against the Saxons in 742–43, when Duke Theoderic was forced to come to terms, and against Odilo, Duke of Bavaria, in 742 and again in 744, when peace was established between the brothers and their brother-in-law, for Odilo had married their sister Hiltrude.

== Strengthening of the dynasty ==
In his realm, Carloman strengthened his authority in part via his support of the Anglo-Saxon missionary Winfrid (later Saint Boniface), the so-called "Apostle of the Germans," whom he charged with restructuring the church in Austrasia. This was in part the continuation of a policy begun under his grandfather, Pepin of Herstal, and continued under his father, Charles Martel, who erected four dioceses in Bavaria (Salzburg, Regensburg, Freising, and Passau) and gave them Boniface as archbishop and metropolitan over all Germany east of the Rhine, with his seat at Mainz. Boniface had been under Charles Martel's protection from 723 on; indeed the saint himself explained to his old friend, Daniel of Winchester, that without it he could neither administer his church, defend his clergy, nor prevent idolatry.

Carloman was instrumental in convening the Concilium Germanicum in 742, the first major synod of the Church to be held in the eastern regions of the Frankish kingdom. Chaired jointly by him and Boniface, the synod ruled that priests were not allowed to bear arms or to host females in their houses and that it was one of their primary tasks to eradicate pagan beliefs. His father had frequently confiscated church property to reward his followers and to pay for the standing army that had brought him victory at Tours (a policy supported by Boniface as necessary to defend Christianity). By 742 the Carolingians were wealthy enough to pay their military retainers and support the Church. For Carloman, a deeply religious man, it was a duty of love; for Pepin a practical duty. Both saw the necessity of strengthening the ties between their house and the Church. Carloman donated the land for one of Boniface's most important foundations, the monastery of Fulda.

== Political ruthlessness ==
Despite his piety, Carloman could be ruthless towards opponents. After repeated armed revolts and rebellions, Carloman in 746 convened an assembly of the Alemanni magnates at Cannstatt and then had most of the magnates, numbering in the thousands, arrested and executed for high treason in the Blood Court at Cannstatt. This eradicated virtually the entire tribal leadership of the Alemanni and ended the independence of the tribal duchy of Alemannia, which was thereafter governed by counts appointed by their Frankish overlords.

These actions strengthened Carloman's position, and that of the family as a whole, especially in terms of their rivalries with other leading Germanic families such as the Bavarian Agilolfings.

== Withdrawal from public life ==
On 15 August 747, Carloman renounced his position as mayor of the palace and withdrew to a monastic life, being tonsured in Rome by Pope Zachary. All sources from the period indicate that Carloman's renunciation of the world was volitional, although some have speculated that he went to Rome for other, unspecified reasons and was "encouraged" to remain in Rome by the pope, acting on a request from Pepin to keep Carloman in Italy.

Carloman founded a monastery on Monte Soratte and then went to Monte Cassino. All sources from the period indicate that he believed his calling was monastic life. He withdrew to Monte Cassino and spent most of the remainder of his life there, presumably in meditation and prayer. His son, Drogo, demanded from Pepin his father's share of the family patrimony, but was swiftly neutralised.

Seven years after Carloman's retirement and on the eve of his death, he once more stepped briefly on the public stage. In 754, Pope Stephen II had begged Pepin, now king, to come to his aid against the king of the Lombards, Aistulf. Carloman left Monte Cassino, at Aistulf's behest, to visit his brother to ask him not to march on Italy. Pepin, believing his uninformed brother was being used by Aistulf to stall for time, continued his preparations and asked his brother to settle in a Benedictine monastery in France instead of returning to Monte Cassino. However, before that could happen Carloman died shortly after in Vienne, on 17 August. He was buried in Monte Cassino.

== Sources ==
- Chisholm, Hugh, ed. (1911). "Carloman s.v. Carloman (d. 754)" . Encyclopædia Britannica. Vol. 5 (11th ed.). Cambridge University Press. p. 343.
- Fouracre, Paul. "The Long Shadow of the Merovingians" in: Charlemagne: Empire and Society, ed. Joanna Story. Manchester University Press, 2005. ISBN 0-7190-7089-9.

Carloman (mayor of the palace) Carolingian dynasty Born: 716 Died: 754
Preceded by Charles Martel	Mayor of the Palace of Austrasia; 741–747	Succeeded by Pepin the Short
