= Vorlage =

Prior version of a text under consideration

A Vorlage (German pronunciation: [ˈfoːɐ̯laːɡə]; from the German for prototype or template) is a prior version or manifestation of a text under consideration. It may refer to such a version of a text itself, a particular manuscript of the text, or a more complex manifestation of the text (e.g., a group of copies, or a group of excerpts). Thus, the original-language version of a text which a translator then works into a translation is called the Vorlage of that translation. For example, the Luther Bible is a translation of the Textus Receptus, so the Textus Receptus is the Vorlage of the Luther Bible.

Sometimes, the Vorlage of a translation may be lost to history. In some of these cases, the Vorlage may be reconstructed from the translation. Such a reconstructed Vorlage may be called a retroversion. Such works are invariably made with some amount of uncertainty. Nevertheless, some parts of a Vorlage may be reconstructed in with a level of confidence such that the translation and its retroversion can be used as a witness for the purposes of textual criticism. A reconstructed Vorlage may stand on its own as the sole witness of the original-language text, or it may be compared and used along with other witnesses.

For example, scholars use the reconstructed Vorlage of the Greek Septuagint translation of the Hebrew Bible in places to correct the Hebrew Masoretic Text version when trying to determine the oldest version of the Hebrew Bible that they can infer, and the Coptic fragments of Plato's Republic included among the Nag Hammadi library have been used to help attest to his original Greek text. For the bulk of the Gospel of Thomas, the Vorlage exists only as a retroversion of the Coptic translation, as no other witnesses to the original Greek text have been identified for many of that Gospel's sayings.
