= Grifo (noble) =

8th-century European ruler

Grifo (c. 726–753) was the son of the Frankish Mayor of the Palace and de facto ruler of the Franks Charles Martel and his second wife Swanachild.

After the death of Charles Martel, power may well have been intended to be divided among Grifo and his half-brothers Pepin the Short and Carloman. Grifo, who was considered illegitimate by Pepin and Carloman, was besieged in Laon by his half-brothers, captured, and imprisoned in a monastery.

On his escape in 747, his maternal great-uncle Duke Odilo of Bavaria provided support and assistance to Grifo, but when Odilo died a year later and Grifo attempted to seize the duchy of Bavaria for himself, Pepin, who had become sole major domo of the Frankish (Merovingian) Empire upon Carloman's resignation and retreat into a monastery, took decisive action by invading Bavaria and installing Odilo's infant son, Tassilo III, as duke under Frankish overlordship. Grifo continued his rebellion, but was eventually killed in the battle of Saint-Jean de Maurienne in 753, while Pepin became king of the Franks as Pepin III in 751.
