= Annales Laurissenses minores =

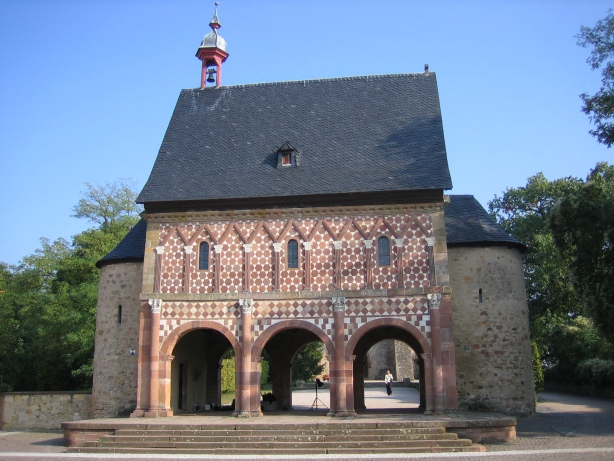
Carolingian gate hall of the former abbey at Lorsch

Annales Laurissenses minores (German: Kleine Lorscher Annalen) or ALM is the Latin name of a medieval, historiographic text from the abbey at Lorsch near Worms in Germany. In many German texts, they are also called the Kleine Lorscher Frankenchronik ("Short Lorsch Chronicle of the Franks"), but in English may be referred to as the "Short chronicle of Lorsch" or "Lesser Annals of Lorsch".

The chronicle was written in the early 9th century AD by a monk at Lorsch Abbey. The name of the author is unknown. In chronological annual reports he describes events in the Frankish Empire during the 8th century, for example, its transition from Merovingian to Carolingian rule. The chronicle begins at the year 680 and ends at the year 817. From 680 to 741 its contents are taken from the Fredegar Chronicle. From 741 to 788 the reports are partly original, but are based partly on the Annales Laurissenses maiores ("Great Lorsch Annals" or Große Lorscher Annalen). The two surviving manuscripts, the Codex Fuldensis and the Codex Remensis, were once found in Fulda and Reims, hence their present names. Later they were taken to Vienna and Bern. From 788 the records in the two codices differ. The Short Lorsch Chronicle was subsequently used as a source by the authors of the Annals of Fulda (Annales Fuldenses).

The Annales Laurissenses minores should not be confused with the Annals of Lorsch (Annales Laureshamenses).
