= Reichsannalen =

Historical records of the Carolingian Empire

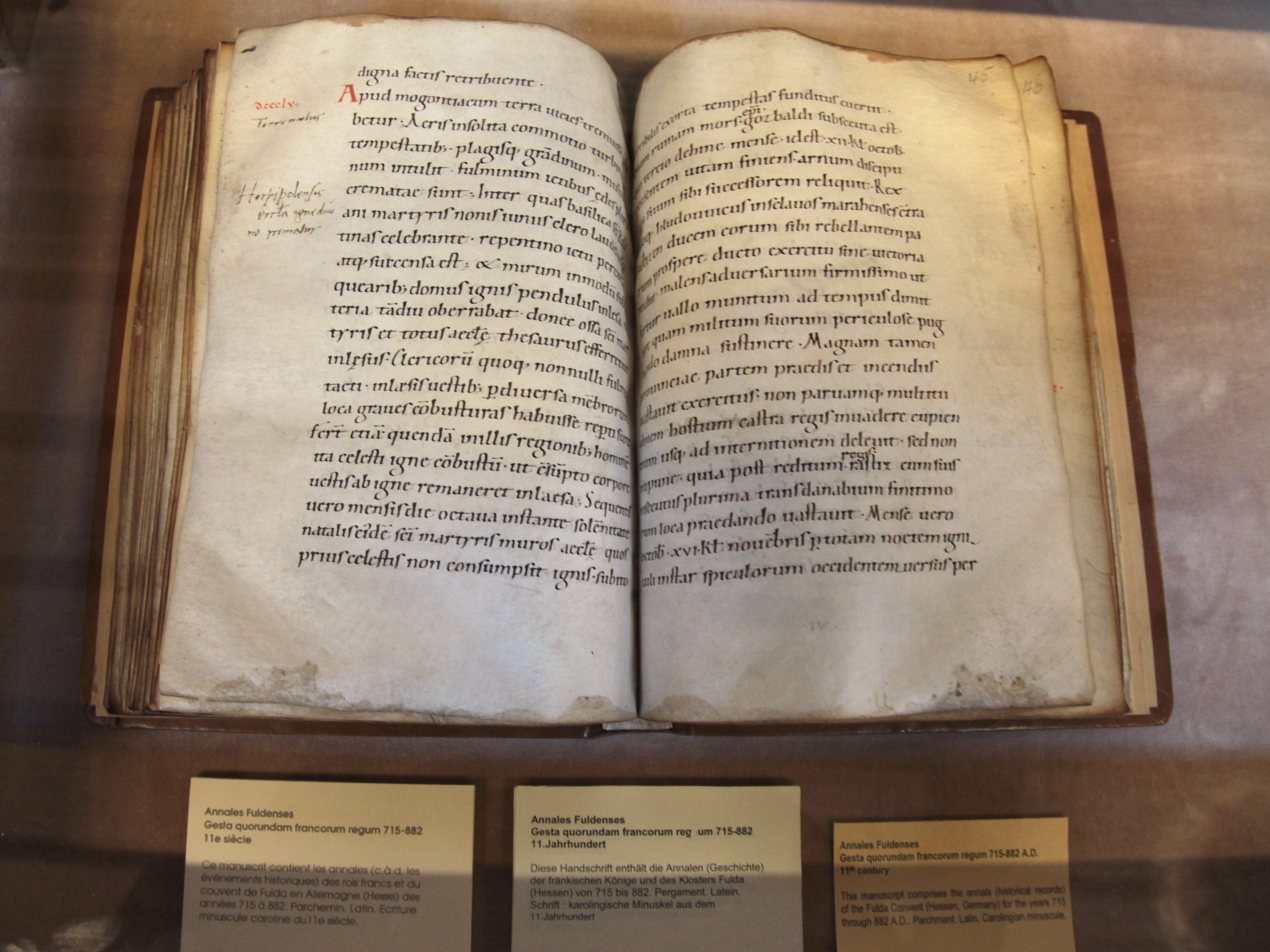
Annales Fuldenses

The Reichsannalen, also known as the Carolingian annals, are a class of early medieval annals that were composed anonymously, in the Latin language, during the Carolingian era, from the second half of the 8th century, up to the beginning of the 10th century. They started to form already during the reign of Pepin the Short (751-768), and became ubiquitous at monasteries throughout the Carolingian Empire during the reign of Charlemagne (768-814) and his successors. They were not composed as official court annals, but often reflected dynastic and imperial views on political and social events, some of them being inclined towards particular dynastic branches, thus reflecting the views of their local rulers and realms.

The Reichsannalen are distinguished from earlier and later classes of annals by their coverage of supranational and not just local events; they covered the entire empire. Though usually composed at monasteries, they are contrasted with monastic annals which emphasise ecclesiastical and especially local happenings over those of the larger Reich. Some historians, such as Ranke (Zur Kritik fränkisch-deutscher Reichsannalisten. Berlin, 1854) have seen a sheen of officiality in the various annals for the kings whose reigns they cover. The authors of the Reichsannalen show a greater awareness of external affairs, military manœuvres, and court politics than the cloistered penmen of the monastic annals.

The earliest of the annals are the Royal Frankish Annals, spanning from 741 to 829. For information before that date, the Chronicon Universale (MGH: Scriptores, XIII, 1–19) was drawn up about 761. The Chronicon contains information derived from Bede, Fredegar, Isidore of Seville, the Liber Pontificalis, the Annales Mosellani, and the Annales Laureshamenses. During the reign of Charlemagne, Reichsannalen proliferate: the Annales Laurissenses minores (c.806), the Annales Maximiniani (810–811), and the Annals of Flavigny (816) crop up.

The Annales Fuldenses, the most famous of them all, appear in the reign of Louis the Pious. They have a regional, East Frankish character, but purport to record national events. The author must certainly have been in touch with the court. They cover the period from in 711 until 901 with information drawn from the Annales Laurissenses minores, the Royal Frankish Annals, and the official Annales Lithienses. The counterpart of the Fuldenses is the Annales Bertiniani in West Francia, of a more universal character and probably more objective. They form the source for the Chronicon de gestis Normannorum in Francia. In Lotharingia, the Annales Vedastini appear and form the basis for the Chronicon Vedastinum, a universal chronicle continuing until 899.

In the 10th century, the Reichsannalen died out: Flodoard of Reims is the only real example, writing from 919 to 966.

== See also ==
- Carolingian Renaissance
- Annales Alamannici
- Annales Xantenses
- Annals of Metz

== Sources ==
- Close, Florence (2010). "Les Annales Maximiniani: Un récit original de l'ascension des Carolingiens". Bibliothèque de l'École des chartes. 168 (2): 303–325.
- Kaschke, Sören (2021). "Enhancing Bede: The Chronicon universale to 741". Historiography and Identity III: Carolingian Approaches. Cultural Encounters in Late Antiquity and the Middle Ages. Vol. 29. Turnhout: Brepols. pp. 201–229.
- Kurze, Fridericus, ed. (1891). Annales Fuldenses sive Annales regni Francorum orientalis. Hannoverae: Impensis Bibliopolii Hahniani.
- McKitterick, Rosamond (2000). "The Illusion of Royal Power in the Carolingian Annals". English Historical Review. 115 (460): 1–20.
- Nelson, Janet L., ed. (1991). The Annals of St-Bertin. Manchester: Manchester University Press.
- Pertz, Georgius Heinricus, ed. (1826). "Annales Laurissenses et Einhardi". Monumenta Germaniae Historica: Scriptores. Vol. 1. Hannoverae: Impensis Bibliopolii Aulici Hahniani. pp. 124–218.
- Pertz, Georgius Heinricus, ed. (1826). "Chronicon Moissiacense". Monumenta Germaniae Historica: Scriptores. Vol. 1. Hannoverae: Impensis Bibliopolii Aulici Hahniani. pp. 280–313.
- Pertz, Georgius Heinricus, ed. (1826). "Annales Fuldenses". Monumenta Germaniae Historica: Scriptores. Vol. 1. Hannoverae: Impensis Bibliopolii Aulici Hahniani. pp. 337–415.
- Pertz, Georgius Heinricus, ed. (1829). "Ex Chronico Moissiacensi". Monumenta Germaniae Historica: Scriptores. Vol. 2. Hannoverae: Impensis Bibliopolii Aulici Hahniani. pp. 257–259.
- Pertz, Georgius Heinricus, ed. (1845). Einhardi Annales. Hannoverae: Impensis Bibliopolii Hahniani.
- Reuter, Timothy, ed. (1992). The Annals of Fulda. Manchester: Manchester University Press.
- Scholz, Bernhard Walter; Rogers, Barbara, eds. (1970). Carolingian Chronicles: Royal Frankish Annals and Nithard's Histories. Ann Arbor: University of Michigan Press.
- Waitz, Georg, ed. (1881). "Chronicon universale - 741, cum continuatione (Annalibus Maximinianis)". Monumenta Germaniae Historica: Scriptores. Vol. 13. Hannoverae: Impensis Bibliopolii Hahniani. pp. 1–25.
- Živković, Tibor (2010). "The Original and the Revised Annales Regni Francorum" (PDF). Историјски часопис. 59: 9–57.
