= Annals =

Historical record in which events are arranged year by year

Annals (Latin: annāles, from annus, "year") are a concise historical record in which events are arranged chronologically, year by year, although the term is also used loosely for any historical record.

== Scope ==
The nature of the distinction between annals and history is a subject based on divisions established by the ancient Romans. Verrius Flaccus, quoted by Aulus Gellius, stated that the etymology of history (from Greek ιστορειν, historein, equated with Latin inspicere, "to inquire in person") properly restricts it to primary sources such as Thucydides's which have come from the author's own observations, while annals record the events of earlier times arranged according to years. Hayden White distinguishes annals from chronicles, which organize their events by topics such as the reigns of kings, and from histories, which aim to present and conclude a narrative implying the moral importance of the events recorded. Generally speaking, annalists record events drily, leaving the entries unexplained and equally weighted.

== History ==
=== Ancient ===
The chief sources of information in regard to the annals of ancient Rome are two passages in Cicero and in Servius which have been the subject of much discussion. Cicero states that, from the founding of the Republic down to the pontificate of Publius Mucius Scaevola (c. 132 BC), it was usual for the pontifex maximus to record the name of the magistrates and the noteworthy events of each year on a white tablet (an album), which was exhibited in an open place at his house so that the people might read it. Servius states the events were written for each day. (Note: Latin: per singulos dies.) In the late Republic, these were known as the Annales Maximi. After the pontificate of Publius, annals were compiled by various unofficial writers, of whom Cicero names Cato, Pictor, and Piso. These annals have been generally regarded as the same with the Commentarii Pontificum cited by Livy, but there seems reason to believe that the two were distinct, with the Commentarii being fuller and more circumstantial. Verrius Flaccus's division of genres is borne out in the common division of Tacitus's works into Annals and Histories, although he did not use those titles to refer to his own works.

=== Medieval ===
Among the early Christians, it was common to establish the date of Easter by asking local Jews for the date of Passover (Nisan 14 in the Jewish calendar) and either using that date or the nearest Sunday to it. By the end of the 3rd century, this date sometimes occurred before the spring equinox and frequently varied from city to city. Following the 325 Council of Nicaea, Easter tables began to be drawn up according to various methods of computing Easter, often running from the Passion until decades or centuries into the future. Beginning in Ireland, Wales, and England in the 7th century, monks began to briefly note important events of the year as marginalia in these tables. Thereafter the compilation of annals became by and large a monastic activity, with the earliest recorded monastic annals being compiled in Ireland and known as the Chronicle of Ireland. Not all early annalistic texts, however, were monastic, and some in fact were made under royal patronage. For example, what is now called the Anglo-Saxon Chronicle, a text concerned mainly with the activities of kings, was written in annalistic form. Other examples of insular annals, written under various kinds of patronage, include the Annals of the Four Masters, the Annals of Ulster, the Annals of Innisfallen, and the Annals of Wales (Annales Cambriæ).

Introduced by insular missionaries to the continent, these texts were recopied, augmented, and continued, especially in Austrasia. During the 9th-century Carolingian Renaissance, they became the usual form of contemporary history: major examples include the Royal Frankish Annals, the Annals of Fulda (Annales Fuldenses), the Annals of St Bertin (Annales Bertiniani), and the Annals of Lorsch (Annales Laureschamenses). As the annals developed into fuller and more descriptive entries, they became more indistinguishable from chronicles, although the term was still used for various works, such as the Annals of Waverley.

=== Modern ===
In modern literature, the term "annals" is similarly loosely applied to works which more or less strictly adhere to the order of years, both in western contexts (English Annual Registers, French Annuaires de la Revue, German Jahrbücher) and to equivalent styles in other cultures (such as the Chinese Spring and Autumn Annals).

It is also applied to various periodicals, particularly peer-reviewed journals in the sciences, after the model of Lavoisier's Annales de chimie et de physique.

== See also ==
Works

- Chinese annals
  - Spring and Autumn Annals
  - Zizhi Tongjian
  - Ming Veritable Records
- The Annals of Tabari (10th century Tabaristan Abbasid Caliphate)
- The German Annals (Annales Alamannici)
- Annals of Joseon Dynasty in Korea
- The Malay Annals (Sejarah Melayu)
- Grotius's Annales et Historia de Rebus Belgicis (1557)
- Bishop Ussher's Annals of the Old Testament
- Cardinal Baronius's Annales Ecclesiastici (12 vols, 1788–1793)
- Hailes's Annals of Scotland from the Accession of Malcolm III to the Accession of the House of Stuart
- Chambers's Domestic Annals of Scotland
- The annals of the emperors of Japan
- Annales martyrum

Periodicals

- The Annals of the American Academy of Political and Social Science
- The Annals of Basilica of Sainte-Anne-de-Beaupré
- The Annals of Clinical Biochemistry
- The Annals of Family Medicine
- The IEEE Annals of the History of Computing
- The Annals of Human Genetics
- The Annals of Internal Medicine
- The Annals of Mathematics
- The Annals of Probability and Annals of Statistics
- The Annals of the Faculty of Law in Belgrade
- The Annals of Improbable Research, a parody of other peer-reviewed journals
