= Annales Alamannici =

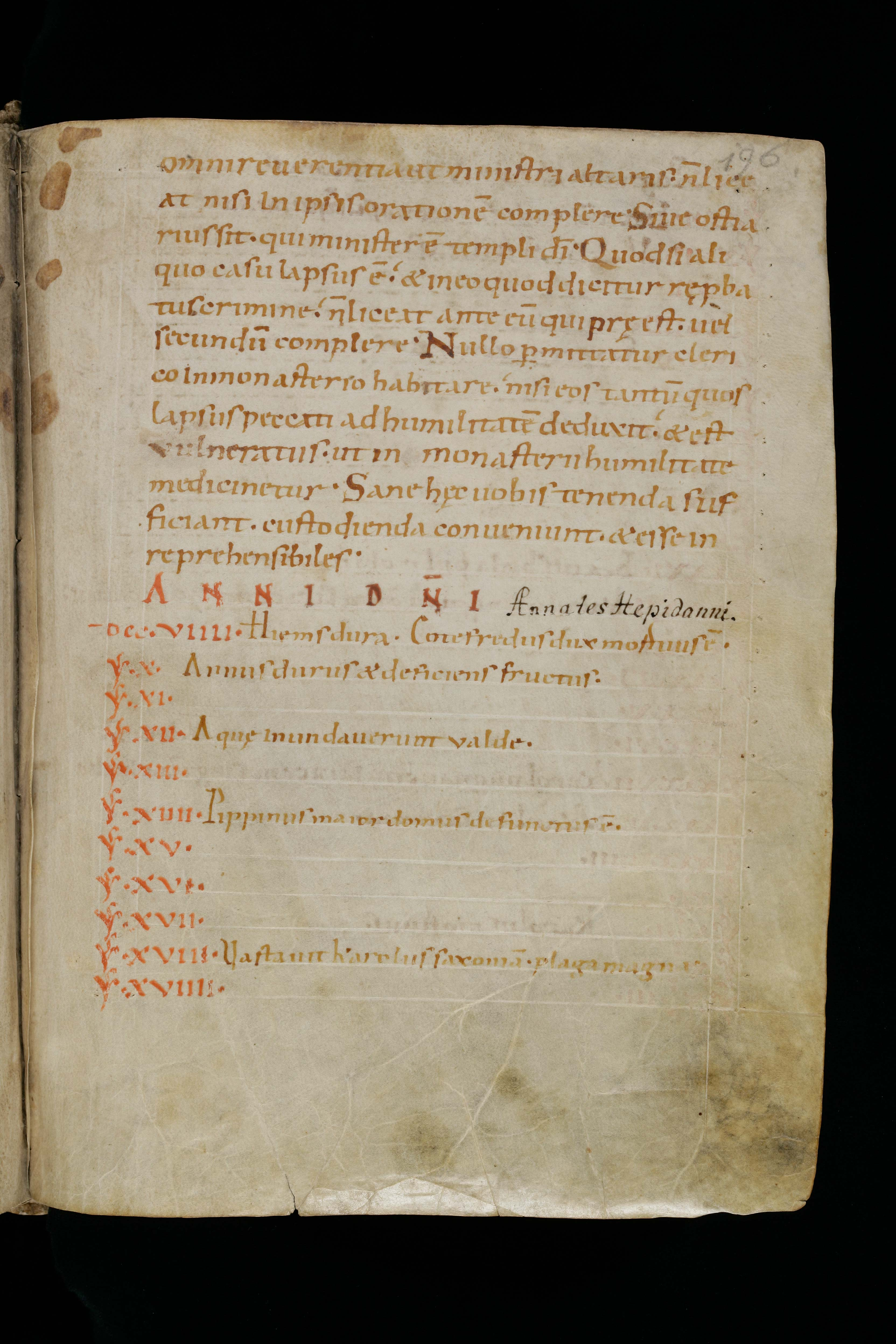
Annales Alamannici in the Annales Sangallenses maiores, starting with the year 709.

The Annales Alamannici provide one of the earliest records of Medieval Europe available. The core text of the Annales Alamannici covers the years 709 through to 799. Spread over several Swabian monasteries, the annals were continued independently in several places, in the Reichenau Abbey up to 939 (continued by Hermannus Contractus), in Abbey of Saint Gall up to 926. The St. Gallen version was continued from 927 to 1059 as the Annales Sangallenses maiores. They depict a limited number of events, in short prose, but their value to scholars is in their medieval representational style.

== Context ==
They are notable for their very short, cursory style and limited narrative. To the modern scholar, they might appear to be incomplete, and for that reason, of limited value. However, in recent years, historians such as Hayden White have argued that the style of the chronicles depict a worldview that is distinctly medieval where "things happen to people rather than one in which people do things." For that reason, they provide insight into the medieval mind and what things the people of the Dark Ages considered important.

== Sources ==
- Annales Alamannici, ed. W. Lendi, Untersuchungen zurfruhalemannischen Annalistik. Die Murbacher Annalen. (Freiburg, 1971)
