= Lorsch Abbey =

Kloster Lorsch
UNESCO World Heritage Site
- The 9th-century Torhalle (gatehouse) is a unique survival of the Carolingian era. It combines some elements of the Roman triumphal arch (arch-shaped passageways, half-columns) with the vernacular Teutonic heritage (baseless triangles of the blind arcade, polychromatic masonry).

- Location within Germany Location within Hesse
- Location: Lorsch, Bergstraße, Hesse, Germany
- Part of: Abbey and Altenmünster of Lorsch
- Criteria: Cultural: (iii), (iv)
- Reference: 515bis-001
- Inscription: 1991 (15th Session)
- Area: 3.11 ha (7.7 acres)
- Buffer zone: 14.825 ha (36.63 acres)
- Website: www.kloster-lorsch.de/en
- Coordinates: 49°39′13″N 8°34′11″E

Lorsch Abbey

Lorsch Abbey, otherwise the Imperial Abbey of Lorsch (German: Reichsabtei Lorsch; Latin: Laureshamense Monasterium or Laurissa), is a former Imperial abbey in Lorsch, Germany, about 10 km (6.2 mi) east of Worms. It was one of the most important monasteries of the Carolingian Empire. Even in its ruined state, its remains are among the most important pre-Romanesque–Carolingian style buildings in Germany.

Its chronicle, entered in the Lorscher Codex compiled in the 1170s (now in the state archive at Würzburg), is a fundamental document for early medieval German history. Another famous document from the monastic library is the Codex Aureus of Lorsch.

In 1991 the ruined abbey was listed as a UNESCO World Heritage Site because of its architectural and historical importance. The significant remains visible today are the 9th-century Torhalle (gatehouse), part of the abbey church, some of the wall around the abbey, and other walls and parts of buildings adapted to modern use.

== History ==
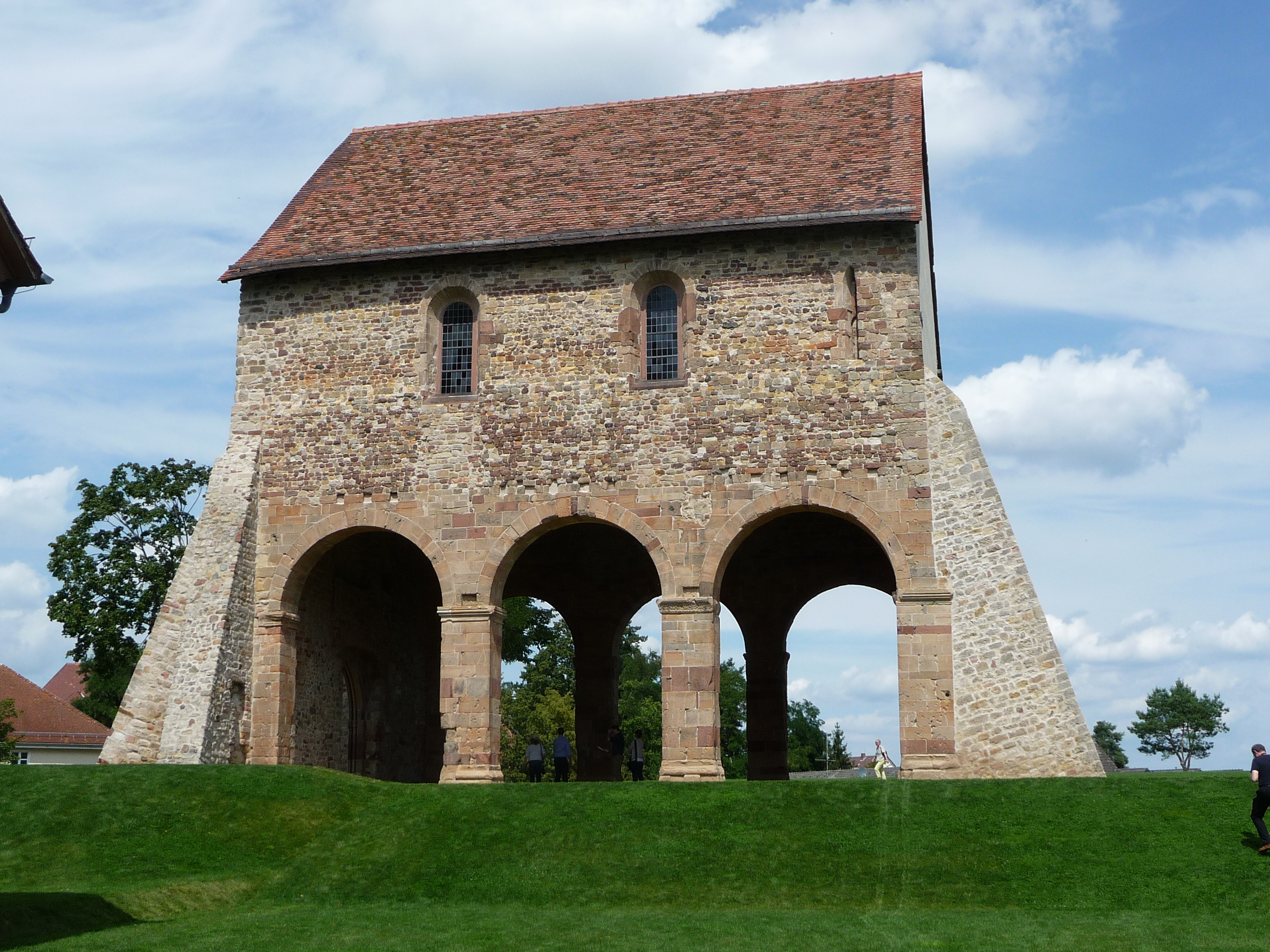
Remains of the church

=== Founding ===
The abbey was founded in 764 by the Frankish Count Cancor and his widowed mother, Williswinda, as a proprietary church (Eigenkirche) and monastery on their estate, Laurissa. It was dedicated to Saint Peter and Saint Paul. The founders entrusted its government to Cancor's cousin, Chrodegang (Archbishop of Metz), who became its first abbot. The monastery was settled by Benedictines from Gorze Abbey near Metz.

The pious founders enriched the new abbey with further donations. To make the abbey popular as a shrine and a place of pilgrimage, Chrodegang obtained from Pope Paul I the body of Saint Nazarius, martyred at Rome with three companions under Diocletian.

On 11 July 765, the sacred relics arrived and with great solemnity were deposited in the basilica of the monastery. In 766 Chrodegang resigned from the office of abbot, in favour of his other duties as Archbishop of Metz. He then sent his brother Gundeland to Lorsch as his successor, with fourteen Benedictine monks.

That same year, there was a dispute about property rights between Gundeland and Cancor's son, and the abbey was moved to an Ice Age dune, a few hundred metres from its original location on a small island in the Weschnitz. In 772, Gundeland applied to the highest authority, Charlemagne, who found in his favour. Gundeland gave the abbey with all his properties to the king, turning it into a Royal abbey.

The abbey and basilica were then renamed in honour of Saint Nazarius: the main church of Saints Peter, Paul, and Nazarius was consecrated by the Archbishop of Mainz in September 774, in the presence of Charlemagne.

=== Influence ===
Many miracles were said to be wrought through the intercession of Saint Nazarius at Lorsch, and from all parts of Europe pilgrims in large numbers came to visit the shrine. In the course of the 9th century the library and scriptorium of Lorsch made it one of the cultural centres of Germany; its four surviving 9th-century catalogues show that it was rich in both Classical and Christian texts.

Few Carolingian manuscripts are better known than the Lorsch gospels, the Codex Aureus of Lorsch, now divided between the Vatican Library and the Batthyaneum Library in Alba Iulia, Romania; the carved ivory consular diptychs of Anastasius (consul 517) that were reused for its bindings are urbane classicising works of art in themselves, and embodiments of the classical tradition of Byzantium as it was transmitted to Lorsch in the time of Charlemagne. The monastery was also where the Lorsch Pharmacopoeia, a famous medical book, was written around the year 800.

In 876, shortly after the death of Ludwig der Deutsche (Louis the German), the abbey became the burial place for the first "German" king. His son, Ludwig der Jüngere (Louis the Younger, died 882), and his grandson Hugo (died 879) were also buried at Lorsch. The burial chapel (ecclesia varia) later continued to serve as a Royal burial ground, e.g. for Kunigunde (died after 915), wife of the first non-Carolingian king, Konrad I (Conrad I).

From 895–956, the abbey was not allowed to elect its own abbots: they were appointed by the king. Emperor Otto I restored this right to Lorsch. A confrontation between ruler and abbot about the construction of the castle of Starkenburg within view of the abbey resulted in abbot Udalrich confronting the king at Trebur with 1,200 armed riders.

Throughout the 11th century, the abbey flourished. Popes and emperors repeatedly favoured the abbey with privileges and estates ranging from the Alps to the North Sea, so that in a short time it became not only immensely rich, but also a seat of political influence. It was declared a reichsabtei (a sovereign principality in its own right, subject directly and solely to the emperor). In 1052, Pope Leo IX came to consecrate an altar in the burial chapel of the eastern Carolingians. By the end of the 11th century, Lorsch had been visited by kings/emperors around 2 times. In 1090, a fire ravaged the abbey, and an extensive rebuilding was conducted in the early 12th century.

The abbey, enjoying sovereign territorial rights, became implicated in several local feuds and in a number of wars. After 46 Benedictine abbots had governed the abbey, Conrad, the last of them, was deposed by Pope Gregory IX in 1226, and through the influence of Friedrich II (Frederick II), Lorsch came into the possession of Siegfried III, Archbishop of Mainz, in 1232, ending the period of Lorsch's cultural and political independence. From 1232–48, Lorsch was used by the Cistercians.

=== Later history ===
In 1248, Premonstratensian canons from Allerheiligen Abbey were given charge of the monastery with the sanction of Pope Celestine IV. In 1461, the abbey was mortgaged to the Electoral Palatinate. In 1556, Elector Palatine Otto Heinrich implemented the Protestant Reformation in his territories and dissolved the monasteries.

He removed the contents of the library to Heidelberg, forming the famous Bibliotheca Palatina, just prior to Lorsch's dissolution in 1557/1563. The remaining members of the abbey's religious community were pensioned off and sent away. In 1623, after the capture of Heidelberg, the Elector Maximilian of Bavaria presented the renowned library, 196 cases of manuscripts, to Pope Gregory XV. Leo Allatius was sent to superintend its removal to Rome, where it was incorporated into the Vatican Library as the "Biblioteca Palatina".

In 2014, the University of Heidelberg created a website, Bibliotheca Laureshamensis reuniting the surviving Lorsch documents in a digital environment. The digitization project was envisioned in 2005 and launched in 2010 but at this point, many libraries and institutions had not yet photographed their manuscripts. Throughout the project, “…an immense change in the attitude towards the publication of digital facsimiles of medieval manuscripts could be noted. More and more cooperating libraries had set up their digitization studios or found commercial partners, the acceptance of international licenses and terms of use for digital images had increased and above all granting free access to digital data had become more common.” More than half of the 309 manuscripts were digitally reproduced by the holding libraries themselves.

As of 2015, the Vatican holds over a third of the surviving Lorsch manuscripts, while the rest are spread out over seventy two institutions in twelve countries.

=== Destruction of the abbey ===
During the Thirty Years' War Lorsch and its neighbourhood suffered greatly. In 1621, Spanish troops pillaged the abbey and most of the buildings at Lorsch were pulled down. After the Archbishopric of Mainz regained possession of it in 1623, the region was returned to the Catholic faith. However, the abbey remained a ruin and served as a source of building materials for the whole region.

The most depressed period for Lorsch was during the wars of Louis XIV of France in the late 17th century. Whole villages in the region were laid in ruins, the homes of the peasantry were burned, and the French soldiers torched the old abbey buildings. One portion, which was left intact, served as a tobacco warehouse in the years before World War I. The ancient gate house, the Königshalle or aula regia ("king's hall"), built in the 9th century by King Louis II, is the oldest largely intact monument of Carolingian architecture.

== Historic names ==
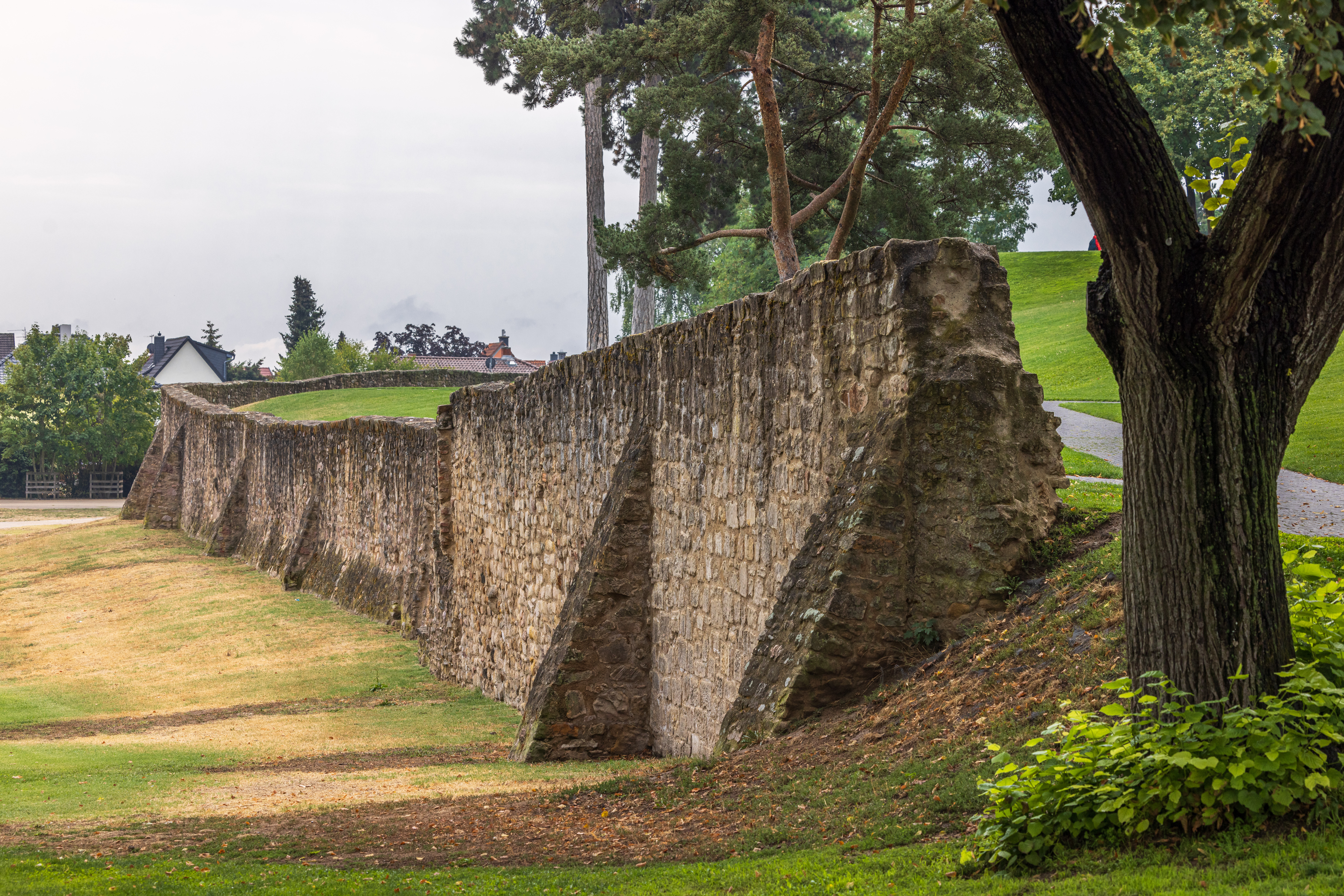
Abbey walls

The following historical names have been recorded:

- In the 8th century: Laurisham
- In the 9th century: Lorishaim
- 9th and 11th centuries: Loresham
- 9th–10th centuries: Laurishaim
- 10th century: Laresham
- 10th–12th centuries: Lareshaeim and Lauresheim
- 11th–12th centuries: Lauresham
- 11th century: Larsem, Loraszam, Lorozam, Lorisham
- 12th century: Laurisca, Laurisham, Laureshan, Loressam, Lorisheym, Lorscheim, Lors

== List of abbots ==
In 468 years, the monastery had 47 abbots.

Name	start	end
Chrodegang	764	765
Gundeland	765	778
Helmerich	778	784
Richbod	784	804
Adalung	804	837
Samuel	837/838	857
Eigilbert	857	864/865
Thiothroch	864/865	876
Babo	876	881
Walther	881	882
Gerhard	883	893
Adalbero	895	897
Liuther	897	900
Adalbero	900	901
Hatto I	901	913
Liuther	914	931
Evergis	931	948?
Brun	948?	951
Gerbod	951	972
Salmann	972	999
Werner I	999	1001
Werner II	1001	1002
Gerold I	1002	1005
Poppo	1006	1018
Reginbald	1018	1032
Humbert	1032	1037
Bruning	1037	1043
Hugo I	1043	1052
Arnold	1052	1055
Udalrich	1056	1075
Adalbert	1075	1077
Winther	1077	1088
Anselm	1088	1101
Gerold II	1101	1105
Hugo II	1105	—
Gebhard	1105	1107
Erminold	1107	1111?
Benno	1111?	1119
Heidolf	1119	—
Hermann	1124	1125
Diemo	1125	1139
Baldemar	1140	1141
Folknand	1141	1148
Hildebert	1148	—
Marquard	1148	1149
Heinrich	1151	1167
Sigehard	1167	1199/1200
Leopold	1199/1200	1214
Konrad	1214	1229

== See also ==
- Carolingian art
- Carolingian dynasty
- Carolingian Renaissance
