= List of battles involving the Franks and Francia =

Early medieval battles involving the Franks and Francia

This is a chronological list of the battles involving the Franks, Francia and West Francia until 987. For later conflicts, see List of battles involving the Kingdom of France.

The list gives the name, the date, the present-day location of the battles, the Frankish allies and enemies, and the result of these conflicts following this legend:

Frankish military victory
Frankish military defeat
Indecisive or unclear outcome

== Merovingians (481–751) ==
Date	Battle	Part of conflict	Location	Allies	Enemies	Result
486	Battle of Soissons	Campaigns of Clovis I	Domain of Soissons	None	Domain of Soissons	Victory
491	491 Thuringian campaign	Campaigns of Clovis I	Eastern Gaul	None	Thuringii	Victory
496	Battle of Tolbiac	Campaigns of Clovis I	Frankish Kingdom	None	Alamanni	Victory
Spring 507	Battle of Vouillé	Campaigns of Clovis I	Visigothic Kingdom	None	Visigoths	Victory
25 June 524	Battle of Vézeronce	Frankish-Burgundian War	Kingdom of Burgundy	None	Burgundians	Defeat
531	Battle of the Unstrut River	531 Thuringian campaign	Thuringii Kingdom	None	Thuringii	Victory
532	Battle of Autun	Frankish-Burgundian War	Kingdom of Burgundy	None	Burgundians	Victory
534	Siege of Arles		Ostrogothic Kingdom	None	Ostrogoths	Victory
October 554	Battle of the Volturnus	Gothic War (535–554)	Byzantine Empire	Alemanni	Byzantine Empire	Defeat
631	Battle of Wogastisburg	Unknown	Unknown	None	Samo's Empire	Defeat
690	Battle of Dorestad	Frisian–Frankish wars	Frisian Kingdom	None	Frisian kingdom	Victory
715	Battle of Cologne	Frisian–Frankish wars Frankish Civil War (715–718)	Frankish Kingdom	None	Neustria Frisian kingdom	Defeat
716	Battle of Amblève	Frisian–Frankish wars Frankish Civil War (715–718)	Frankish Kingdom	None	Neustria Frisian kingdom	Victory
9 June 721	Battle of Toulouse	Umayyad invasion of Gaul	Duchy of Aquitaine	None	Umayyad Caliphate	Victory
732	Battle of the River Garonne	Umayyad invasion of Gaul	Duchy of Aquitaine	None	Umayyad Caliphate	Defeat
25 October 732	Battle of Tours	Umayyad invasion of Gaul	Duchy of Aquitaine	None	Umayyad Caliphate	Victory
736	Battle of the Boarn	Frisian–Frankish wars	Frisian Kingdom	None	Frisian kingdom	Victory
736	Siege of Nîmes	Umayyad invasion of Gaul	Septimania	None	Umayyad Caliphate	Victory
737	Siege of Avignon	Umayyad invasion of Gaul	Kingdom of Burgundy	None	Umayyad Caliphate	Victory
737	Siege of Narbonne	Umayyad invasion of Gaul	Septimania	None	Umayyad Caliphate	Victory
737	Battle of the River Berre	Umayyad invasion of Gaul	Septimania	None	Umayyad Caliphate	Victory
752–759	Siege of Narbonne	Umayyad invasion of Gaul	Septimania	None	Umayyad Caliphate	Victory

== Carolingians (751–987) ==
Battle	Date	Current location	Contemporary location	Allies	Enemies	Result
Reconquista
Conquest of the Spanish March	760–810	Spain	Emirate of Córdoba	None	Emirate of Córdoba	Victory
Battle of Roncevaux Pass	15 August 778	(France) / (Spain) Pyrenees	Duchy of Vasconia	None	Vascones	Defeat
Siege of Lérida (797)	797	Spain	Emirate of Córdoba	None	Emirate of Córdoba	Victory
Siege of Barcelona (800–801)	800–801	Spain	Emirate of Córdoba	None	Emirate of Córdoba	Victory
Battle of Pancorbo	816	Spain	Emirate of Córdoba	None	Emirate of Córdoba	Defeat
Battle of Roncevaux Pass (824)	824	Spain	Emirate of Córdoba	Basques	Emirate of Córdoba	Defeat
Battle of Albelda (851)	851	Spain	West Francia	None	Emirate of Córdoba	Defeat
Frankish Expansion
Siege of Bourbon (761)	761	France	Duchy of Aquitaine	None	Duchy of Aquitaine	Victory
Siege of Clermont (761)	761	France	Duchy of Aquitaine	None	Duchy of Aquitaine	Victory
Siege of Chantelle (761)	761	France	Duchy of Aquitaine	None	Duchy of Aquitaine	Victory
Siege of Bourges (762)	762	France	Duchy of Aquitaine	None	Duchy of Aquitaine	Victory
Siege of Thouars (762)	762	France	Duchy of Aquitaine	None	Duchy of Aquitaine	Victory
Battle of Narbonne (763)	763	France	Duchy of Aquitaine	None	Duchy of Aquitaine	Victory
Siege of Toulouse (767)	767	France	Duchy of Aquitaine	None	Duchy of Aquitaine	Victory
Saxon Wars	772–804	Germany	Saxony	None	Saxons	Victory
Siege of Pavia	773–774	Italy	Kingdom of the Lombards	None	Lombards	Victory
Conquest of Lombardy	774	Italy	Kingdom of the Lombards	None	Lombards	Victory
Battle of Süntel	782	Germany	Saxony	None	Saxons	Defeat
Campaigns against the Avars	791–805	Hungary	Avar Khaganate	None	Avars	Victory
Annexion of Bavaria	794	Germany	Duchy of Bavaria	None	Bavarians	Victory
Siege of Trsat	Autumn 799	Croatia	Duchy of Croatia	None	Croats Citizens of Tarsatica	Defeat
Battle of Comacchio	809	Italy	Francia	None	Byzantine Empire	Victory
Battle of Blain	24 May 843	France	Kingdom of Brittany	None	Bretons	Defeat
Battle of Ballon	22 November 845	France	Kingdom of Brittany	None	Bretons	Defeat
Battle of Jengland	22 August 851	France	Kingdom of Brittany	None	Bretons	Defeat
Battle of Andernach (876)	8 October 876	Germany	East Francia	None	East Francia	Defeat
Viking Invasions
Siege of Paris (845)	845	France	West Francia	None	Vikings	Defeat
Battle of Brissarthe	2 July 866	France	West Francia	None	Vikings Bretons	Defeat
Battle of Saucourt-en-Vimeu	3 August 881	France	West Francia	None	Vikings	Victory
Siege of Paris	25 November 885 – October 886	France	West Francia	None	Vikings	Victory
Siege of Chartres (911)	911	France	West Francia	None	Vikings	Victory
Battle of Trans-la-Forêt	1 August 939	France	Viking-occupied Brittany	Bretons	Vikings	Victory

== See also ==
- Military history of France
- List of battles involving France (disambiguation)
- List of wars involving Francia
