= Siege of Toulouse (767) =

Date	Winter 767
Location	Toulouse
Result	Frankish victory

Belligerents
Francia	Duchy of Aquitaine

Commanders and leaders
Pepin the Short	

The siege of Toulouse was a Frankish siege of the Aquitanian fortified town of Toulouse in the winter of 767 during the Aquitanian War. The Frankish army under King Pepin the Short conquered the town and accepted the surrender of nearby Albi and Gevaudan.

== Prelude ==
In early 767 King Pepin the Short of Francia army marched through Aquitaine into Narbonne and moved on to besiege Toulouse. Bourges, conquered in 762 by Pepin, was the most important base for the campaign.

== Siege ==
Toulouse was conquered and the nearby towns of Albi and Gevaudan submitted to Pepin without a fight.

== Aftermath ==
Most and possibly all of the fortified places in Aquitaine were in Frankish hands by the end of 767. Pepin returned home and spent Easter at Vienne. He continued the war against Aquitaine in August 767. In the next year, King Pepin defeated the last few allies of Waiofar, Duke of Aquitaine (between 745 and 768), and then captured him and most of his family and executed them in public. Waiofar escaped but was assassinated by his frustrated followers in 768.

== Bibliography ==
- Bachrach, Bernard (1974). "Military Organization in Aquitaine under the Early Carolingians". Speculum. 49 (1): 1–33. doi:10.2307/2856549. JSTOR 2856549. S2CID 162218193.
- Petersen, Leif Inge Ree (2013). Siege Warfare and Military Organization in the Successor States (400-800 AD): Byzantium, the West and Islam. Leiden: Brill Publishers. ISBN 978-90-04-25199-1.
- Royal Frankish Annals (1970). Royal Frankish Annals and Nithard's Histories. Translated by Scholz, B.W. Ann Arbor: University of Michigan Press. ISBN 0-472-06186-0.
