= Siege of Bourbon (761) =

Frankish siege during the Aquitanian War

Date	761
Location	Bourbon, Berry
Result	Frankish victory

Belligerents
Francia	Duchy of Aquitaine

Commanders and leaders
Pepin the Short	

Casualties and losses
	Garrison captured Bourbon burned

The siege of Bourbon was a Frankish siege of the Aquitanian fortress of Bourbon in 761 during the Aquitanian War. The Frankish army under King Pepin the Short invested, stormed and burned the fortress, taking the garrison prisoner.

== Prelude ==
In 761, the Duke of Aquitaine Waiofar launched an invasion of Francia, advancing on the Frankish bases of Autun and Chalon and the royal residence of Mailly. King Pepin the Short of Francia was furious at Waiofar's actions and ordered a Frankish army to assemble at the Loire river. He was accompanied by his son Charles.

== Siege ==
Pepin's army marched to Bourbon by way of Troyes, Auxerre and Nevers, where he crossed the Loire. The Frankish army surrounded Bourbon with fortified camps. They then stormed the Aquitanian fortress and set it on fire. The survivors of the garrison deployed there by Waiofar were taken prisoner. These men were referred to by the continuator of Fredegar as men of Waiofar, homines Waiofarii, indicating they were not permanent residents of Bourbon.

== Aftermath ==
Pepin's army rampaged through Aquitaine, devastating the Duchy. His next target was the fortress of Clermont in Auvergne, which he besieged later that year.

== Bibliography ==
- Bachrach, Bernard (1974). "Military Organization in Aquitaine under the Early Carolingians". Speculum. 49 (1): 1–33. doi:10.2307/2856549. JSTOR 2856549. S2CID 162218193.
- Petersen, Leif Inge Ree (2013). Siege Warfare and Military Organization in the Successor States (400-800 AD): Byzantium, the West and Islam. Leiden: Brill Publishers. ISBN 978-90-04-25199-1.
- Royal Frankish Annals (1970). Royal Frankish Annals and Nithard's Histories. Translated by Scholz, B.W. Ann Arbor: University of Michigan Press. ISBN 0-472-06186-0.
