= Hunald II =

Hunald II, also spelled Hunold, Hunoald, Hunuald or Chunoald (French: Hunaud), was the Duke of Aquitaine from 768 until 769. He was probably the son of Duke Waiofar, who was assassinated on the orders of King Pippin the Short in 768. He laid claim to the duchy following Pippin's death later that year, but his revolt was crushed by Pippin's eldest son, Charlemagne. Hunald fled to the Duchy of Gascony, but he was handed over to Charlemagne and put into captivity. Nothing more is heard of him.

Following the naming patterns of the time, Hunald was probably named after his grandfather, Hunald I. All the members of his family, including himself, bore names of Germanic origin. Certain historians have advanced the hypothesis that Hunald I, who retired to a monastery in 745, came out of retirement to lead it again in 768. This is unlikely on chronological grounds, and there is a tradition that Hunald I died at Rome in 756. Most historians treat the two as different people.

When Waiofar was killed in 768, Hunald II initially fled to Gascony. Following the death of Pippin, however, he returned to raise the standard of revolt in Aquitaine. The provinces of the Frankish realm had been divided on Pippin's death between his sons Charlemagne and Carloman. The province of Aquitaine was itself divided between them. In any case, it was under complete Frankish control at Pippin's death.

Word of Hunald's revolt probably reached Charlemagne at Rouen in March or April 769. According to his biographer, Einhard, so concerned was he that he "went so far as to ask his brother for help". He informed Carloman and arranging a meeting at Moncontour, where Carloman refused to participate in or provide troops for an attack on Aquitaine.

Charlemagne then marched his small retinue to Mornac, where he arrived by late May, and from there to Angoulême. According to Einhard, Charlemagne was pursuing Hunald but could not bring him to battle because the latter knew the region better. At Angoulême, Charlemagne began raising a larger army. It marched out in July towards the confluence of the Dordogne and Garonne rivers, the latter forming the border between Aquitaine and Gascony. Near the confluence of the rivers, Charlemagne constructed a fortress that became known as "that of the Franks", Franciacum (today Fronsac). Since Hunald had again fled to Gascony, Charlemagne sent envoys to Duke Lupus II of Gascony ordering him to find and arrest Hunald and his family and turn them over to him. In terror, according to Einhard, Lupus captured Hunald and his wife and turned them over to Charles's representatives. Charles then crossed the Garonne to accept Lupus's formal submission in person. In the campaign of 769, Charlemagne seems to have followed a policy of "overwhelming force" and avoided a major pitched battle.

== Sources ==
- Bachrach, Bernard (1974). "Military Organization in Aquitaine under the Early Carolingians". Speculum. 49 (1): 1–33. doi:10.2307/2856549. JSTOR 2856549. S2CID 162218193.
- Bachrach, Bernard (2013). Charlemagne's Early Campaigns (768–777): A Diplomatic and Military Analysis. Leiden: Brill.
- Chamard, François (1884). "L'Aquitaine sous les derniers Mérovingiens". Revue des questions historiques. 18 (35): 5–51.
- Collins, Roger (1990). The Basques. London: Blackwell.
- Higounet, Charles (1963). Bordeaux pendant le Haut Moyen Âge. Bordeaux: Fédération historique du Sud-Ouest.
- James, Edward (1982). The Origins of France: From Clovis to the Capetians, 500–1000. Basingstoke: Macmillan.
- Lewis, Archibald Ross (1965). The Development of Southern French and Catalan Society, 718–1050. Austin: University of Texas Press.
- McKitterick, Rosamond (1983). The Frankish Kingdoms under the Carolingians, 751–987. London: Longman.
- Pfister, Christian (1911). "Hunald, Duke of Aquitaine" . In Chisholm, Hugh (ed.). Encyclopædia Britannica. Vol. 13 (11th ed.). Cambridge University Press. p. 892.

| Preceded by Waiofar | Duke of Aquitaine; 768–769 | Succeeded by Ranulf I of Aquitaine |
