= Waiofar =

Duke of Aquitaine (r. 745–768)

Waiofar, also spelled Waifar, Waifer or Waiffre (died 2 June 768), was the last independent Duke of Aquitaine from 745 to 768. He peacefully succeeded his father, Hunald I, after the latter entered a monastery. He also inherited the conflict with the rising Carolingian family and its leader, Pepin the Short, who was king of the Franks after 751 and thus Waiofar's nominal suzerain.

== War with Pepin ==
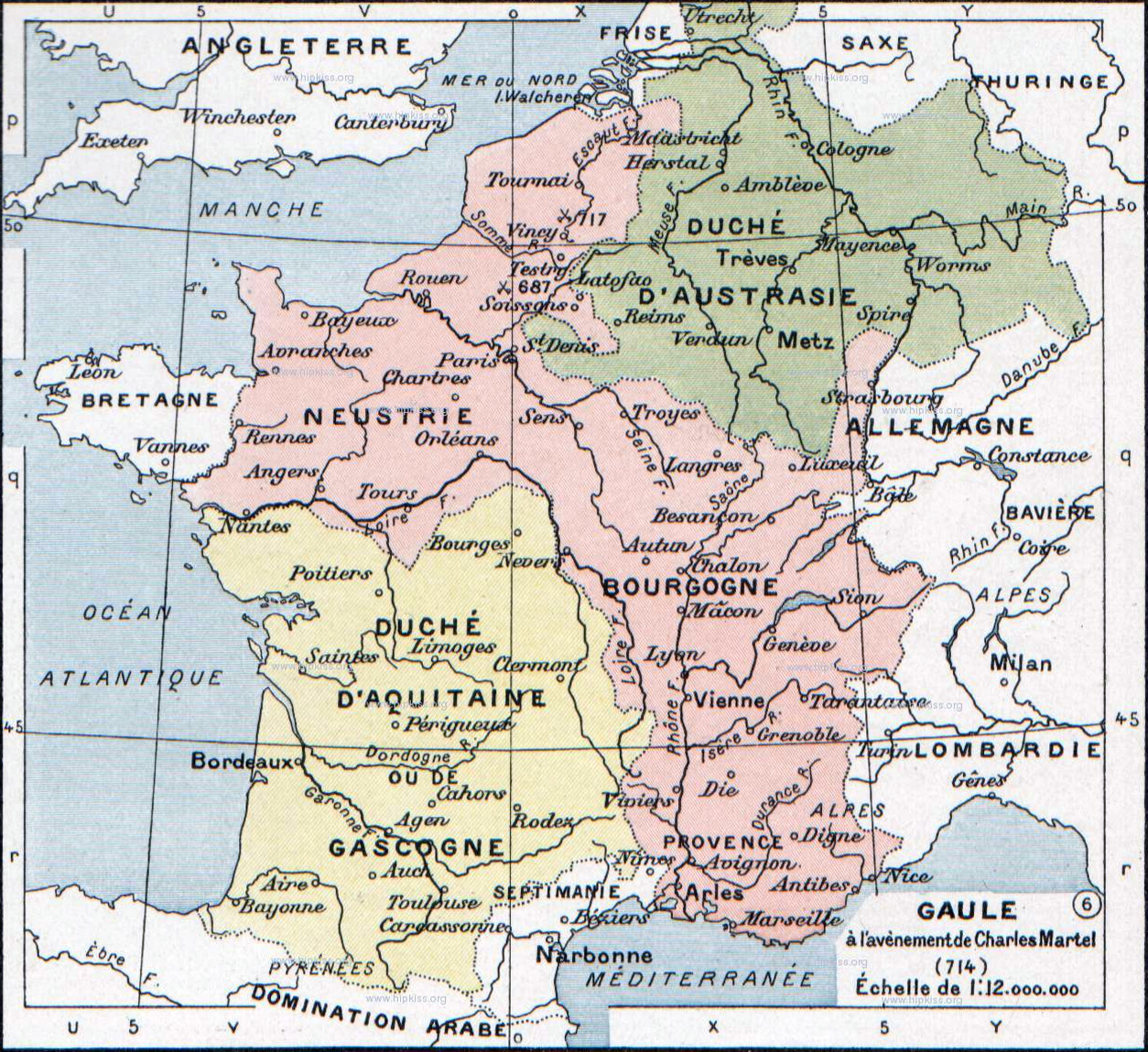
Francia and other territories under Frankish influence in 714

=== 752–760 ===
The beginning of open conflict between Waiofar and Pepin can be dated to 753, when the duke of Aquitaine granted asylum to Pepin's brother Grifo after the latter was forced to flee Francia because of his failed attempt at usurping the Duchy of Bavaria from its rightful lord. Pepin's immediate reaction is not recorded. In 753, Grifo and his military escort while traveling from Aquitaine to Lombardy, likely to stir up more trouble for Pepin, was intercepted by two local counts near the River Arc. In the clash that followed, Grifo and both counts were killed.

In 751, according to the Chronicle of Moissac, Waiofar sacked the city of Narbonne (Narbonam depraedat), the centre of Islamic rule north of the Pyrenees, having been conquered by the Arabs in 720. The following year several other formerly Visigothic cities north of the Pyrenees, under a certain Count Ansemund, went over to the Franks. Between 752 and 759, Pepin's forces besieged Narbonne. For reasons unknown, Waiofar attacked Pepin's forces while they were camped by the city, "as his father had attacked Charles Martel" in the words of the Annals of Aniane. Only the local sources, the Chronicle of Moissac and Annals of Aniane, record this attack. Although the Chronicle of Uzès records that the Rouergue was conquered by Pepin in 754, during the siege of Narbonne, it is more likely that its conquest was effected with the assistance of the local Visigoths only after the fall of Narbonne (a Gothic city prior to the Arab conquest).

The Annals of Aniane and Chronicle of Moissac indicate that the Frankish army under Pepin began the conquest of southern Aquitaine immediately after the fall of Narbonne in 759, and by 760 Toulouse, Rodez (capital of the Rouergue) and Albi had fallen into their hands.

=== 760–763 ===
In 760, Pepin denounced Waiofar's seizure of church lands and prepared to march against him. Ignoring the latter's request for peace, Pepin invaded Berry and the Auvergne and ravaged "a large part of Aquitaine" (maximam partem Aquitaniae). In 761, Waiofar responded by ordering Count Chunibert of Bourges and Count Blandinus of the Auvergne, his followers who controlled the northeastern borders of Aquitaine, to assemble their forces for an attack on Chalon-sur-Saône. This army probably consisted mostly of local levies, since no Gascon (Basque) presence is mentioned. The Gascons (or Basques, Latin Vascones), whose presence the continuator of the Chronicle of Fredegar is otherwise scrupulous to record, were recruited from Gascony and served a professional core of Waiofar's army. In the ensuing campaign, Burgundy was ravaged, but Pepin pushed the invaders back and took the fortresses of Bourbon, Chantelle and Clermont in the Auvergne, forcing Count Blandinus to surrender. The garrison at Bourbon is described by the continuator of Fredegar as the "men of Waiofar" (homines Waiofarii). At the end of this campaign, Pepin obtained permanent control of many fortresses in the Auvergne by treaty.

In 762, Pepin invaded Berry and Poitou. He captured Bourges, forcing the surrender of Count Chunibert, after a lengthy siege in which breastworks were erected around the city and ramparts constructed for putting siege weapons up to the walls. Thouars fell the same year, and the count of Poitiers made submission to Pepin. The Annales Laurissenses maiores record that many Gascons in the following of the counts of Bourges and Poitiers were captured and brought back to Neustria.

In 762, Waiofar's cousin Count Mantio, with a Gascon levy, lay an ambush for a Carolingian force, either as it was entering or leaving Narbonne. His men dismounted and lay in wait, but in the subsequent battle they were routed. Mantio and his retinue were all killed and the Gascons fled on foot, with the Carolingians taking their horses as booty.

=== 763–766 ===
In 763, Waiofar offered to submit to Pepin if he would receive Bourges and other Aquitainian cities in exchange for "whatever tribute and gifts (tributa uel munera) Frankish kings had been accustomed to receive from the province of Aquitaine". Nothing came of it. In 763, Pepin raided deep into Aquitaine as far as the Limousin and Quercy. In 764, Pepin held a Mayfield, the Frankish annual assembly, in the city of Worms. Waiofar and Duke Tassilo III of Bavaria attended.

According to the continuator of Fredegar, Waiofar opposed Pepin "with a great army and many Vascones [Gascons] from across the Garonne, who in antiquity were called Vaceti [Basques]" in 765. The "great army" and the "large levy" of Gascons may be distinct forces brought together for this campaign. In 764, Count Chilping of the Auvergne led such a dual force of local levies complemented by some Gascon soldiers taken from the garrison of Clermont.

Between 763 and 766, Waiofar withdrew his garrisons from the cities (civitates) of Poitiers, Limoges, Saintes, Périgueux and Angoulême. Most of these fortifications were restored after the cities were occupied by Pepin's forces. Archibald Lewis believes it was Pepin who destroyed the walls after he had conquered the cities if he judged he could not hold them. His interpretation is contradicted by Bernard Bachrach, who believes it was Waiofar who, before abandoning his cities, destroyed their defences and walls to prevent Pepin from using them against him.

This final phase of the war was fought with increasing brutality, and the chroniclers record that Pepin burnt villas, despoiled vineyards and depopulated monasteries. During this period (763–66) the fortress of Berry was held by a Frankish garrison.

== Loss of power and death ==
By 766 most of Waiofar's followers had abandoned him, but the war over Aquitaine did not end even with his death, shortly before Pepin's own, in 768. The final active phase of the war between the two (766–67) was fought mainly in the Périgord, the Angoumois and the Bordelais, all regions closer to Gascony, which if not ruled directly by Waiofar was either under his control or allied to him. The chroniclers record how Pepin destroyed fortresses and cities, castella and civitates, and so devastated the countryside that "there was no settler to work the land" (nullus colonus terram ad laborandam). Around this time, Pepin defeated the Gascons in pitched battle.

In 768, the erstwhile count of Bourges, Blandinus, submitted to Pepin. Most of Waiofar's family was captured and executed in the forest of Périgord. Waiofar himself was assassinated by his own men, allegedly at Pepin's instigation, on 2 June. A kinsman, perhaps his son, Hunald II, succeeded to his claims on Aquitaine and continued to fight against Pepin's successor, Charles.

== Rule in Aquitaine ==
There is one charter issued by Waiofar preserved in the cartulary of the basilica of Saint-Julien at Brioude. Styling himself and his predecessor, Hunald, "princes" (principes), Waiofar granted a villa to one Gedeon as a precarium for life in exchange for another villa and two pounds of silver. The charter was drawn up around 756–57 ("in the month of September in the 12th year of lord Waifarius, prince") in the Limagne ("in pago limanico"). Waiofar may have been copying the policy of his rival Pepin from 743 to 44, when the latter ordered his followers who had received church lands to return them to the church, make a payment (cens) and receive them back as precaria verbo regis ("by the king's word") from the church. By creating precaria, Waiofar could raise men and troops to defend Aquitaine from the impending war with Pepin. The continuator of Fredegar records how Waiofar confiscated church lands and distributed them to his followers.

According to Adhemar of Chabannes, writing 250 years later, Pepin granted two villas to the canons of the abbey of Saint-Martial and the cathedral of Saint-Étienne at Limoges during his wars with Waiofar.

Although much is known of Waiofar's wars with Pepin the Short, little is known of his administration of Aquitaine. He did use counts (Latin comites, singular comes) to govern major cities (civitates, sing. civitas) in the Frankish manner. At least Bourges, Poitiers and the Auvergne had Aquitainian counts. In the case of Thouars, which was merely a castle (castra), a count was appointed to command the garrison (custodes).

Archibald Lewis suggests that the abundance of Gascon (Basque) troops among Waiofar's forces stems from an unrecorded alliance with Duke Lupus II of Gascony; in the same way he suggests Pepin formed an alliance with the Goths of Septimania after his conquest of Narbonne.

Waiofar's uncle Remistanius, although he was not in the service of the duke, was wealthy enough to form an army to besiege several Carolingian garrisons. In 765, Pepin bribed Remistanius with gold, silver, cloth, horses and arms to come over to his side. He appointed him to govern eastern half of the region of Bourges up to the river Cher and granted him control of the citadel in the city itself. At the time, Chunibert, who had served as count of Bourges under Waiofar until he lost the city to Pepin in 762, was again serving as count, this time to Pepin.

== Sources ==
- Bachrach, Bernard (1974). "Military Organization in Aquitaine under the Early Carolingians". Speculum. 49 (1): 1–33. doi:10.2307/2856549. JSTOR 2856549. S2CID 162218193.
- Collins, Roger (1989). The Arab Conquest of Spain, 710–97. Oxford: Oxford University Press. ISBN 0631159231.
- Collins, Roger (1990). The Basques. London: Blackwell.
- Collins, Roger (1992). "The Vaccaei, the Vaceti, and the rise of Vasconia". Law, Culture and Regionalism in Early Medieval Spain. London: Variorum. ISBN 0860783081. Originally published in Studia Historica, VI (Salamanca, 1988).
- Curta, Florin (2006). "Merovingian and Carolingian Gift Giving". Speculum. 81 (3): 671–99. doi:10.1017/s0038713400015670. S2CID 162708420.
- Doniol, Henri [in French], ed. (1853). Cartulaire de Brioude [Liber de honoribus sancto Juliano collatis]. Clermont-Ferrand: Thibaud.
- Freising, Otto von (1966). Mierow, Charles Christopher; Evans, Austin Patterson; Knapp, Charles (eds.). The Two Cities: A Chronicle of Universal History to the Year 1146 A.D. Translated by Mierow, Charles Christopher. New York: Octagon Books.
- Higounet, Charles (1962). Bordeaux pendant le Haut Moyen Âge. Fédération historique du Sud-Ouest.
- Lewis, Archibald Ross (1965). The Development of Southern French and Catalan Society, 718–1050. Austin: University of Texas Press.
- Oman, Charles (1914). The Dark Ages, 476–918. London: Rivingtons.
- Reimitz, Helmut (2015). History, Frankish Identity and the Framing of Western Ethnicity, 550–850. Cambridge University Press.
- Wallace-Hadrill, J. M., ed. (1960). The Fourth Book of the Chronicle of Fredegar. London: Thomas Nelson.

Preceded by Hunald I	Duke of Aquitaine; 745–768	Succeeded by Hunald II
