= Investment (military) =

Military term for surrounding an enemy position

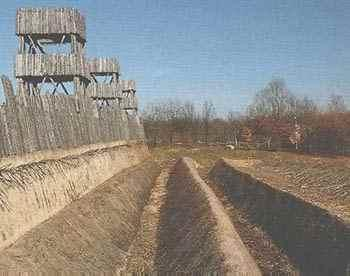
Reconstructed section of the investment fortifications at Alesia

Investment is the military process of surrounding an enemy fort (or town) with armed forces to prevent entry or escape. It serves both to cut communications with the outside world and to prevent supplies and reinforcements from being introduced.

A contravallation is a line of fortifications built by the attackers around the besieged fortification facing towards an enemy fort to protect the besiegers from sorties by its defenders and to enhance the blockade. The contravallation can be used as a base to launch assaults against the besieged city or to construct further earthworks nearer to the city.

A circumvallation may be constructed if the besieging army is threatened by a field army allied to the besieged fort. It is a second line of fortifications outside the contravallation that faces away from an enemy fort. The circumvallation protects the besiegers from attacks by allies of the city's defenders and enhances the blockade of an enemy fort by making it more difficult to smuggle in supplies.

Lines of contravallation and circumvallation generally consist of earthen ramparts and entrenchments that encircle the besieged city.

== Antiquity ==
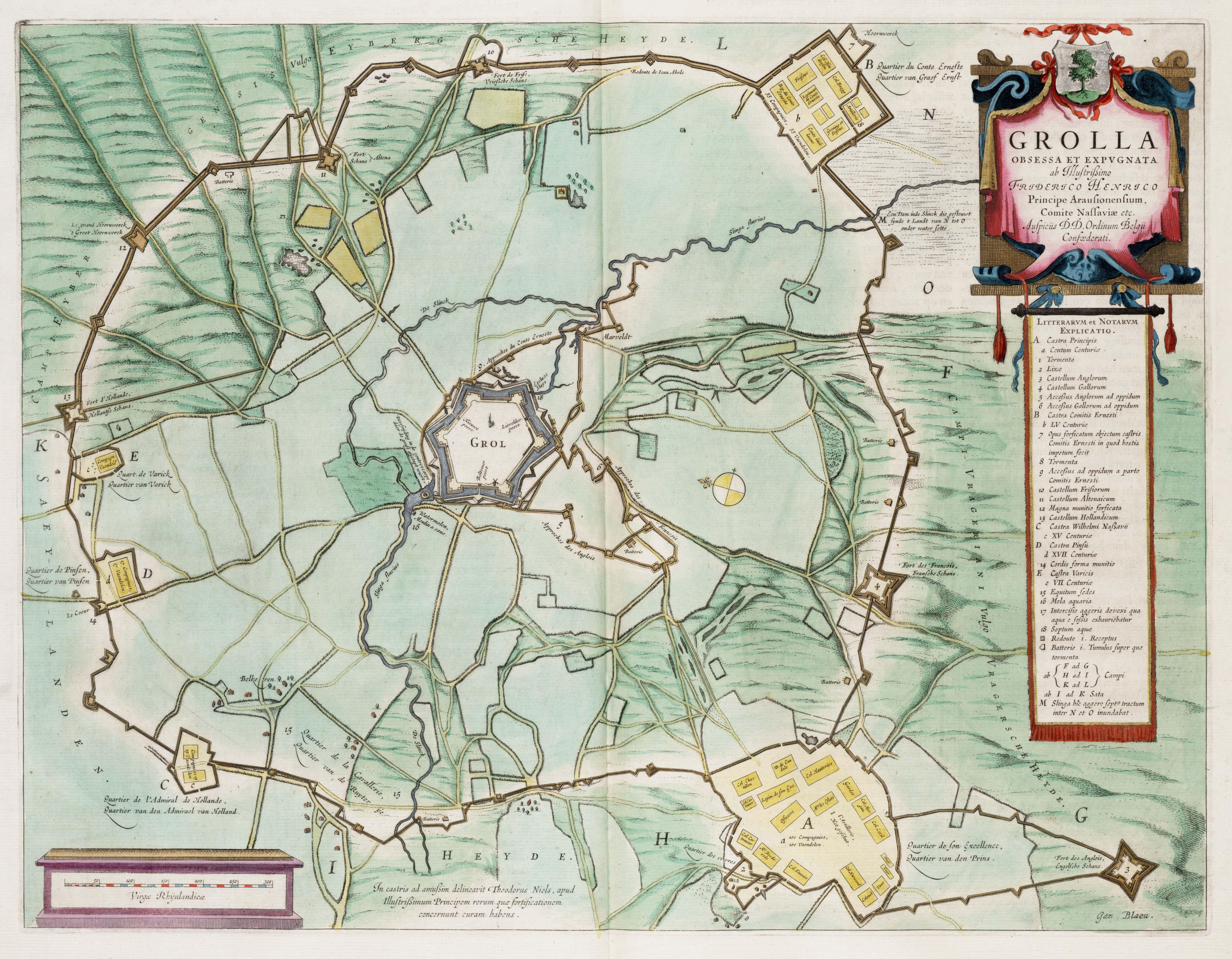
Schematic view of the circumvallation during the Siege of Groenlo in 1627

Thucydides notes the role circumvallation played in the Sicilian Expedition and in the Spartan siege of Plataea during the initial stages of the Peloponnesian War in 429 BC.

Julius Caesar in his Commentaries on the Gallic War describes his textbook use of the circumvallation to defeat the Gauls under their chieftain, Vercingetorix, at the Siege of Alesia in September 52 BC.

During the Siege of Jerusalem, Titus and his Roman legions built a circumvallation, cutting down all trees within fifteen kilometres (9 miles).

== Middle Ages ==
Another example from the pre-modern period is the Siege of Constantinople (717–718).

The caliph of the Umayyad Empire took advantage of the violent anarchy in the Byzantine Empire to prepare a huge host, comprising more than 100,000 troops and 1,800 ships, to take them to the Byzantine capital, Constantinople. Upon arriving outside the city's Theodosian walls, the Arab army had some knowledge that Emperor Leo III the Isaurian had allied with Bulgaria under Khan Tervel, and so, in preparation for the Bulgarian army, built a set of stone walls against the city and against the countryside, with the Arab camp in between.

King Pepin the Short of Francia built a number of fortified camps during his Siege of Bourbon (761) to surround the town completely. He built a complete set of lines of circumvallation and contravallation during the Siege of Bourges (762).

== Modern era ==
The basic objectives and tactics of a military investment have remained the same in the modern era. During the Second World War, there were many sieges and many investments. One of the best-known sieges of the war, which demonstrated the tactical use of investment, was the Siege of Stalingrad. During the first half of the siege, the Germans were unable to fully encircle the city and so the Soviets got men and supplies in across the Volga River. During the second half of the battle, the complete investment of Stalingrad by the Soviets, including airspace, which prevented the construction by the Germans of an adequately large airbridge, eventually forced the starving Germans in the city to surrender.

In modern times, investments and sieges of cities are often combined with intensive shelling, air strikes and extensive use of land and/or sea mines.

== See also ==
- Encirclement
- List of established military terms

== Sources ==
- Petersen, Leif Inge Ree (2013). Siege Warfare and Military Organization in the Successor States (400–800 AD): Byzantium, the West and Islam. Leiden: Brill. ISBN 978-90-04-25199-1.
