= Hunald I =

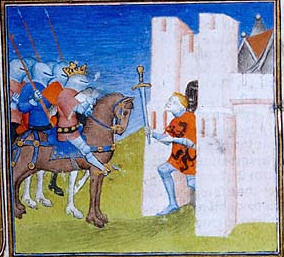
Late medieval depiction of Hunald surrendering the stronghold of Loches to Pippin. In fact, Pippin took the stronghold but not Hunald.

Hunald I, also spelled Hunold, Hunoald, Hunuald or Chunoald (Note: French: Hunaud.) (died 756), was the Duke of Aquitaine from 735 until 745. Although nominally he was an officer of the Merovingian kings of Francia, in practice Aquitaine was completely autonomous when he inherited it. His rule corresponds to the lowest point of the Merovingian monarchy, when the kingdom was in fact ruled by the mayors of the palace. Hunald was forced at the outset of his reign to accept the authority of the mayor of the palace Charles Martel, but he tried three times to throw it off in open revolt (736, 742 and 745). He was unsuccessful, although he did manage to retain Aquitaine undiminished. In 745, he retired to a monastery, giving power to his son Waiofar. He later went to Rome, where he died during an attack on the city.

In spite of the opinion of certain historians that Hunald left his monastery to lead Aquitaine again in 768, Hunald I seems to have been a different person from the Hunald II, probably his grandson, who led the revolt that followed the death of Waiofar.

== Succession ==
Hunald succeeded his father, Duke Odo the Great, after the latter's death in 735. His brother Hatto seems to initially have acted alongside him. Hunald, like his father, brother and son, possessed a name of Germanic origin. The Aquitanian province that he inherited had been enlarged by his father (and possibly earlier ancestors also) to include territory along the Loire that had once been Neustrian and the Auvergne region that had been Austrasian.

== Relations with Charles Martel ==
In 735, Charles Martel led an expedition into Aquitaine. He marched the breadth of the country and occupied the well-fortified city of Bordeaux. He is not recorded as having met any resistance. The purpose of this expedition seems to have been to take advantage of the death of Odo to alter the constitutional status of Aquitaine in the Frankish kingdom by forcing Hunald to recognise his lordship and to remit taxes (munera) to the royal government. The show of force worked. The Annales Mettenses priores record that Charles gave the duchy (ducatus) of Aquitaine to Hunald and made him and his brother Hatto give a "promise of faith" (promissio fidei) to him and his sons, Carloman I and Pippin III, and promise to remit taxes. Following this success, Charles did not retain Bordeaux or any other part of Aquitaine, including those that had been added to it by Odo.

The Vita Pardulfi, the late 8th-century life of Pardulf (died 737), records that Hunald succeeded his father as princeps, a term with royal connotations, and later served Charles as legatus. Despite their promise of faith, Hunald and Hatto rebelled against Charles in 736. After considerable fighting, Hatto was captured by Charles's forces and handed over to Ainmar, bishop of Auxerre. Hatto subsequently escaped from prison, and Charles deposed Ainmar and had him imprisoned. He was later killed attempting to escape from prison. Hatto was betrayed by his own brother. Hunald invited him to a meeting at Poitiers, where he blinded him and imprisoned him in a monastery. The betrayal of Hatto was probably the price exacted by Charles in exchange for allowing Hunald to keep his duchy.

The peace between Hunald and Charles seems to have persisted until Charles's death in 741, although there is some evidence of low-level conflict. In 736–39, Charles Martel and his brother, Childebrand I, led several expeditions against the Umayyad forces occupying parts of Septimania and Provence. The Annals of Aniane, writing about a later date, record that Hunald's son Waiofar harassed the forces of Charles's son Pippin the Short during the latter's siege of Narbonne in 752–59 "as his father had done Charles Martel", implying that Hunald had harassed Charles's forces during the southern campaigns of 736–39. Despite achieving a crushing victory over the Umayyads at the battle of the River Berre in 737, Charles never besieged Narbonne, possibly because Hunald was threatening his lines of communication.

== Rebellion of 742 ==
The most serious of Hunald's revolts was that of 742. This was undertaken in alliance with the dukes of Bavaria and Alemannia. All three dukes sought to regain their old autonomy following the death of Charles Martel. This also coincided with an interregnum, since no king had been appointed to succeed Theuderic IV after his death in 737.

Having raised an army, the brothers crossed the Loire at Orléans and proceeded to sack the city of Bourges and the fortress of Loches. In the words of the Chronicle of Fredegar:

[T]he Gascons of Aquitaine rose in rebellion under Duke Chunoald, son of the late Eudo. Thereupon the princely brothers Carloman and Pippin united their forces and crossed the Loire at the city of Orléans. Overwhelming the Romans (Note: The Aquitanians were called Romans because they followed Roman law, specifically the compendium known as the Breviary of Alaric. This was confirmed as the supreme law of Aquitaine by Pippin the Short in 768. Cf. James 1982, p. 19) they made for Bourges, the outskirts of which they set on fire; and as they pursued the fleeing Duke Chunoald they laid waste as they went. Their next objective, the stronghold of Loches, fell and was razed to the ground, the garrison being taken prisoner. Their victory was complete. Then they divided out the booty among themselves and took off the local inhabitants to captivity [and] got home about the autumn of the same year. . .

The reference to Gascons (that is, Basques) probably indicates that Hunald had Gascon allies, since Gascony was a distinct land from Aquitaine at that time. Before leaving Aquitaine, Carloman and Pippin met at Vieux-Poitiers to agree on a division of Francia between them, having imprisoned their illegitimate half-brother Grifo. This division did not include Aquitaine in recognition of its continuing autonomy.

In the autumn of 742, after Carloman and Pippin had left, Hunald crossed the Loire in support of Duke Odilo of Bavaria's ongoing revolt. He sacked the city of Chartres, where he is said to have burnt the church of Saint Mary to the ground. This is the earliest mention of the church of Chartres which was to become the cathedral. There is no record of Hunald meeting any opposition. In early 743, Carloman and Pippin placed a king on the throne, Childeric III, ending a six-year interregnum. This was probably in response to the poor defence put up by the counts against the invasion of Hunald. The ability to do so in the name of the king would increase the brothers' authority.

== Final submission, retirement and death ==
In 745, Carloman and Pippin invaded Aquitaine again to punish Hunald for the raid of 742. According to the Annales Mettenses priores, Hunald knew that he could not resist and so swore an oath to obey their "every will" (omnem voluntatem), gave hostages and remitted the taxes owed. This was a humiliation for him and he soon retired to a monastery on the Île de Ré. In the words of the Annales Mettense, he, "taking off the crown on his head and swearing a monk's vow, entered the monastery that is on the isle of Ré". He was succeeded by his son Waiofar.

About 752, Hunald went to Rome, where he joined one of the suburban monasteries attached to Saint Peter's Basilica. In 756, Rome was attacked by the Lombard king Aistulf. The suburbs were undefended and Hunald died in the fighting. Probably, as an experienced war leader, he had taken charge of the defence of Saint Peter's, although he may have been stoned to death.

Hunald was probably the inspiration for the character Huon de Bordeaux of the eponymous twelfth-century chanson de geste.

== Sources ==
- Bachrach, Bernard (2001). Early Carolingian Warfare: Prelude to Empire. Philadelphia: University of Pennsylvania Press.
- Bellarbre, Julien (2014). "La " nation " aquitaine dans l'historiographie monastique du sud de la Loire (VIII^{e}–XII^{e} siècles)"". Revue de l'Institut Français d'Histoire en Allemagne. 6.
- Duchesne, Louis, ed. (1886). Le Liber Pontificalis: Texte, introduction et commentaire. Vol. 1. Paris: Ernest Thorin.
- Duchesne, Louis (1914). "Notes sur la topographie de Rome au Moyen Âge — XII, Vaticana (suite)". Mélanges de l'École française de Rome. 34: 307–56.
- Higounet, Charles (1963). Bordeaux pendant le Haut Moyen Âge. Bordeaux: Fédération historique du Sud-Ouest.
- James, Edward (1982). The Origins of France: From Clovis to the Capetians, 500–1000. Basingstoke: Macmillan.
- Knitter, Brian John (2000). Thierry of Chartres and the West Façade Sculpture of Chartres Cathedral (Master's thesis). San Jose State University.
- Lewis, Archibald Ross (1965). The Development of Southern French and Catalan Society, 718–1050. Austin: University of Texas Press.
- Lewis, Archibald Ross (1976). "The Dukes in the Regnum Francorum, A.D. 550–751". Speculum. 51 (3): 381–410. doi:10.2307/2851704. JSTOR 2851704. S2CID 162248053.
- McKitterick, Rosamond (1983). The Frankish Kingdoms under the Carolingians, 751–987. London: Longman.
- Pfister, Christian (1911). "Hunald, Duke of Aquitaine" . In Chisholm, Hugh (ed.). Encyclopædia Britannica. Vol. 13 (11th ed.). Cambridge University Press. p. 892.
- Wallace-Hadrill, J. M., ed. (1960). The Fourth Book of the Chronicle of Fredegar. London: Thomas Nelson.
- Wood, Ian N. (1994). The Merovingian Kingdoms, 450–751. London: Longman.

Preceded by Odo	Duke of Aquitaine; 735–745	Succeeded by Waiofar
