= Battle of Narbonne (763) =

Date	763
Location	Narbonne
Result	Frankish victory

Belligerents
Francia	Duchy of Aquitaine

Commanders and leaders
Count Australdus; Count Galemanius	Count Mantio †

Strength
Retinues	Retinues; Gascon levies

Casualties and losses
	Mantio's retinue killed Gascon horses captured

The Battle of Narbonne was a military engagement near Narbonne in 763 during the Aquitanian War. The forces of the Frankish counts Australdus and Galemanius defeated the Aquitanian forces of Count Mantio, killing Mantio and his retinue in the process and routing the Gascon levies in the Aquitanian service.

== Prelude ==
Duke Waiofar of Aquitaine sent his cousin, count Mantio, reinforced with Gascon levies and other magnates and their followings, to take the Frankish-held town of Narbonne in 763. Waiofar's plan was to ambush the Frankish garrison, deployed there against the Muslims, as it attempted to enter the town or leave it for home.

== Battle ==
Counts Australdus and Galemanius, commanding the garrison, were leaving the town with their retinues, when Mantio's men and dismounted Gascon levies attacked them. After a bitter fight, Mantio and all his companions were killed by the Frankish counts. The Gascon levies were routed and the Franks pursued them, taking their horses and other belongings.

== Aftermath ==
Waiofar's attempt to take an important Frankish base at his border ended in failure, as did all of his other efforts to conduct similar raids against the Franks.

== Bibliography ==
- Bachrach, Bernard (1974). "Military Organization in Aquitaine under the Early Carolingians". Speculum. 49 (1): 1–33. doi:10.2307/2856549. JSTOR 2856549. S2CID 162218193.
- Petersen, Leif Inge Ree (2013). Siege Warfare and Military Organization in the Successor States (400-800 AD): Byzantium, the West and Islam. Leiden: Brill Publishers. ISBN 978-90-04-25199-1.
