= List of battles involving France =

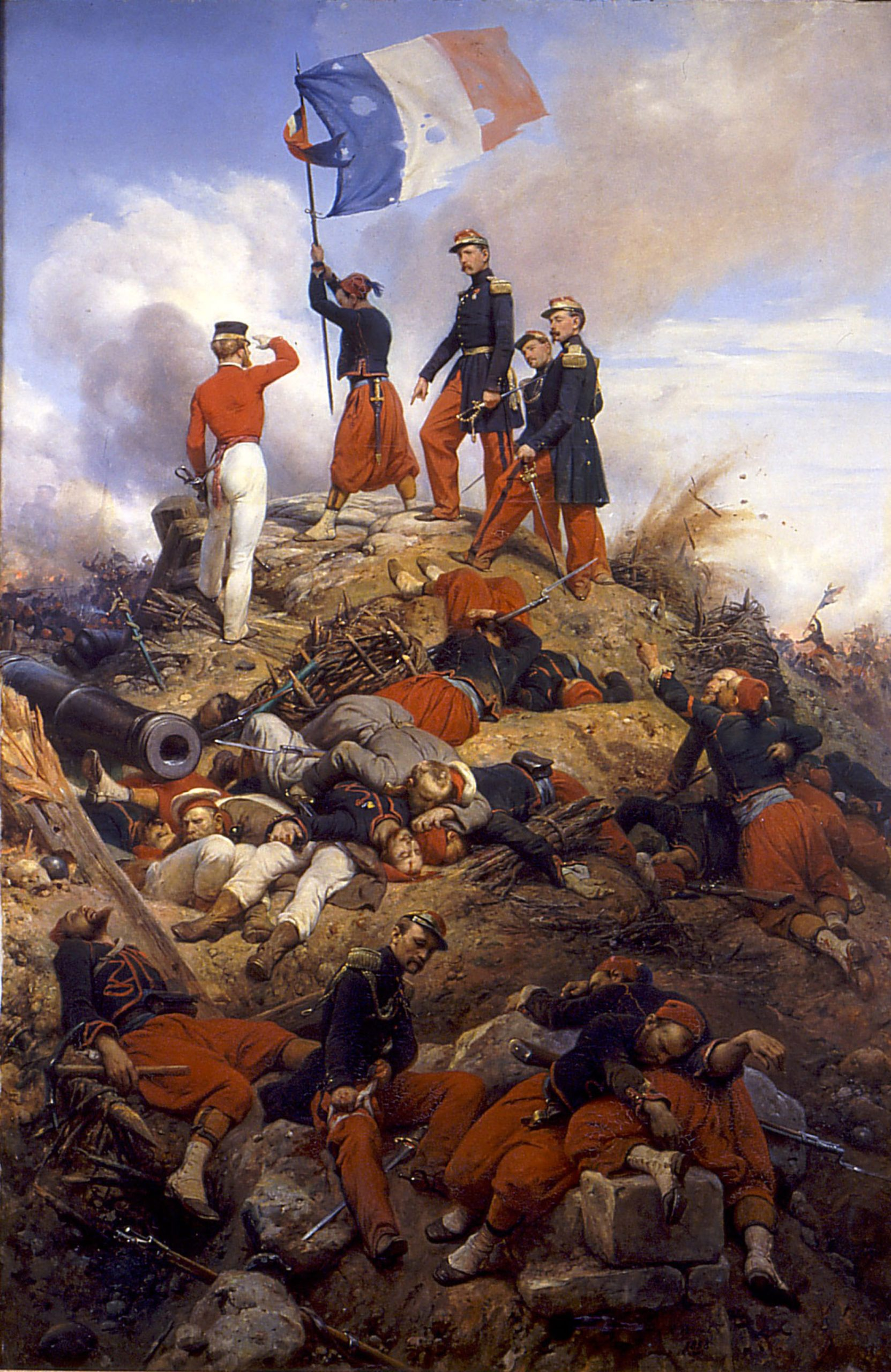
The Battle of Malakoff (1855) during the Crimean War, by Horace Vernet (1858)

List of battles involving France, Francia and the Franks may refer to:

- Entire pre-987 wars involving the Franks and Francia, see List of wars involving Francia.
  - Specific pre-987 battles involving the Franks and Francia, see List of battles involving the Franks and Francia.
- Entire wars involving the Kingdom of France (987–1792), see List of wars involving the Kingdom of France.
  - Specific battles involving the Kingdom of France (987–1792) see List of battles involving the Kingdom of France.
- Entire post-1792 wars, see List of wars involving France.
  - Specific post-1792 battles, see List of battles involving France in modern history.

== See also ==
- Military history of France
- List of wars involving France
- French Armed Forces
- Deployments of the French military
