= List of wars involving the Kingdom of France =

Wars involving France from 987 until 1792

This is a list of wars involving the Kingdom of France from 987 until the abolition of the French monarchy on 21 September 1792.

- For specific battles involving the Kingdom of France, see List of battles involving the Kingdom of France.
- For pre-987 wars, see List of wars involving Francia.
  - For pre-987 battles involving the preceding Franks and (West) Francia, see List of battles involving the Franks and Francia.
- For post-1792 wars, see List of wars involving France.
  - For specific post-1792 battles, see List of battles involving France in modern history.

French victory
French defeat
Another result *

*e.g. a treaty or peace without a clear result, status quo ante bellum, result of civil or internal conflict, result unknown or indecisive, inconclusive

== Early and High Middle Ages ==
Conflict	Combatant 1	Combatant 2	Outcome
Reconquista (722–1492): Battle of Las Navas de Tolosa; Location: Iberia	Kingdom of Castile; Kingdom of León; Kingdom of Navarre; Crown of Aragón; County of Portugal; Kingdom of Portugal; Kingdom of France; Many other Christian states and Crusader orders	Islamic states and factions of Iberia	Christian victory
Charles-Hugh Capet war (987–991) Location: Iberia	Kingdom of France	Lower Lotharingia	French victory
The Breton War (1076–1077) Location: Brittany	Duchy of Brittany; France	England; Duchy of Normandy	Victory: Philip I of France prevents further Norman expansion into the region
The Vexin War (1087) Location: Vexin	France	England; Duchy of Normandy	Victory: Anglo-Norman failure to conquer the 'French Vexin'; William I mortally wounded
First Crusade (1096–1099) Location: Mostly Levant and Anatolia	Kingdom of France; Holy Roman Empire; Various Christian Kingdoms and Crusader orders	Fatimid Caliphate; Seljuk Empire; Sultanate of Rûm; Danishmends; Seljuk Emirate of Aleppo; Seljuk Emirate of Damascus; Abbasid Caliphate	Crusader Victory
The Second Vexin War (1097-1098) Location: Vexin	France	England; Duchy of Normandy	Inconslusive Truce: Mixed Results; Status Quo Ante Bellum in Vexin; Failure to conquer French Vexin by Normans; Northern Maine Annexed by Normandy
Crusade of 1101 Location: Anatolia	Kingdom of France; Holy Roman Empire; Byzantine Empire; Papal States	Sultanate of Rum	Rum victory
Anglo-French War 1109–13 Location: Normandy	Kingdom of France	Duchy of Normandy; Kingdom of England	Truce
Anglo-French War 1116–19 Location: Normandy	Norman Rebels; Kingdom of France	Duchy of Normandy; Kingdom of England	Anglo-Norman Victory
Anglo-French War 1123–1135 Location: France	Kingdom of France; County of Maine	Duchy of Normandy; Kingdom of England	Rebellion in Maine suppressed by Anglo-Normans, French remain in a strong position, Henry I dies. The White Ship incident opens succession question and the Anarchy begins before conclusive result
Second Crusade (1147–1150) Location: Iberia, Levant and Anatolia	Kingdom of France; Various Christian Kingdoms and Crusader orders	Various Muslim Kingdoms	Mixed results: Iberia – Crusader Victory; Levant – Status quo; Anatolia – Crusader Defeat
Anglo-French War 1158–1189 Location: France	Kingdom of France; Angevins supporting Prince Richard	Kingdom of England	Revolt of 1173-74 defeated, Richards revolt successful in 1189 with the help of Philip II and French forces, Treaty of Azay-le-Rideau, Prince Richard becomes king of England at expense of Henry II following the battle of Ballans
Anglo-French War 1193–1199 Location: France	Kingdom of France	Kingdom of England	Truce at Vernon
Third Crusade (1189–1192) Location: Levant and Anatolia	Kingdom of France; Holy Roman Empire; Kingdom of England; Various Christian Kingdoms and Crusader orders	Ayyubid Sultanate; Sultanate of Rûm; Byzantine Empire; Empire of Cyprus	Crusader Victory
Fourth Crusade (1202–04) Location: Holy Land and Byzantine Empire	Kingdom of France; Holy Roman Empire; Republic of Venice	In Europe: Byzantine Empire; Kingdom of Croatia (in union with Hungary); Holy Land: Ayyubid Sultanate	Division of Byzantine Empire
French invasion of Normandy (1202–1204) Location: Normandy	Kingdom of France	Kingdom of England	French Victory, Normandy, Anjou and Maine annexed by France
Albigensian Crusade (1209–1229) Location: Languedoc, France	Crusade: Papal States; Episcopal Inquisition; Dominican Order; Militia of the Faith of Jesus Christ; Hospitallers of the Holy Spirit; Knights of Saint George; Kingdom of France; Duchy of Burgundy; Duchy of Brittany; County of Nevers; County of Auxerre; County of Saint-Pol; Viscounty of Donges; Viscounty of Torèna; English volunteers; Duchy of Austria; Duchy of Berg; Electorate of Cologne; County of Aurenja: County of Provence–Forcalquier	Cathars; County of Toulouse; Viscounty of Béziers and Albi; County of Valentinois; Lordship of Séverac; Marquisate of Provence; Viscounty of Béarn; County of Astarac; Crown of Aragon; County of Foix; County of Comminges; Viscounty of Carcassonne; Lordship of Menèrba; Lordship of Tèrmes; Lordship of Cabaret; Lordship of Montsegúr; Exiled knights	Crusader Victory
Anglo-French War (1213-14): Battle of Bouvines; Location: France, Flanders	Kingdom of France	Angevin Empire: Kingdom of England; County of Anjou; Duchy of Normandy; Duchy of Aquitaine; Holy Roman Empire; County of Flanders; County of Boulogne	French Victory: Truce of Chinon; Collapse of the Angevin Empire; End of the German throne dispute
First Barons War (1215–17) Location: England	Army of God and Holy Church; Kingdom of France	Pro-Angevin forces	French Invasion Defeat
War of the Succession of Champagne (1216-1222) Location: County of Champagne (mostly concentrated in southeastern Champagne), Duchy of Lorraine, Alsace	Count of Champagne; Kingdom of France; Holy Roman Empire; Duchy of Burgundy; County of Bar medieval Papacy	Most of the local barons in the eastern and southern borderlands of Champagne, united under Erard of Brienne claiming succession by marrying Theobald IV's cousin Philippa. Duchy of Lorraine	French Victory: Theobald IV succeeds as count, Countess-Regent Blanche centralizes authority over local barons; Champagne secures control over local barons east of the Marne river; Champagne's borders extended east at the expense of Lorraine
Fifth Crusade (1217–1221) Location: Egypt and Levant	Kingdom of France; Various Christian Kingdoms and Crusader Orders	Ayyubids	Crusader Defeat
Poitou War (1224) Location: Poitou	France	England	French Victory
English reclamation of Gascony (1225-1226) Location: Gascony	France	England	French Defeat: England regains control of Gascony; Gascony remains a Plantagenet possession until the end of the Hundred Years’ War
English invasion of France (1230) (1230) Location: Brittany and Western France	France	England	English Withdrawal
Breton Conflict (1234) (1234) Location: Brittany	France	Duchy of Brittany; England	English loss of Brittany as vassal
Barons' Crusade (1239–1241) Location: Levant	France; England; Kingdom of Navarre; Kingdom of Jerusalem	Ayyubids	Crusader Diplomatic Victory
Saintonge War (1242–1243): Battle of Taillebourg; Location: Saintonge	France	England	French Victory
Seventh Crusade (1248–1254) Location: Egypt	Kingdom of France: Poitou; Anjou; Artois; Principality of Morea; Knights Templar	Ayyubids	Crusader Defeat
Eighth Crusade (1270) Location: Tunisia	Kingdom of France; Crown of Aragon; Kingdom of Sicily; Kingdom of Navarre; County of Luxembourg; Scottish volunteers	Hafsid dynasty	Inconclusive: Crusaders withdraw from Tunisia; Death of Louis IX of France; Treaty of Tunis; Opening of trade with Tunis
Guerra de la Navarrería (1276) Location: Navarre	Kingdom of France	Crown of Castille Kingdom of Navarre	Victory
War of the Sicilian Vespers (1282–1302): Aragonese Crusade; Location: Sicily and Catalonia	Angevin Kingdom of Naples; Kingdom of France; Kingdom of Majorca Kingdom of Navarre	Crown of Aragon; Kingdom of Trinacria	French defeat: Peace of Caltabellotta, House of Barcelona gains Sicilian throne; Division of the pre-war Kingdom of Sicily into Trinacria (insular Sicily) and Angevin Kingdom of Naples; Aragon gains suzerainty over the Kingdom of Majorca; Aragon gains claim on Corsica and Sardinia; Papacy cedes right to name king of Sicily; Frederick III agrees to pass throne to House of Anjou upon death (later reneges)
War of the Strait (1292–1350) Location: Mediterranean Sea (Strait of Gibraltar)	Crown of Aragon Kingdom of Castile; Kingdom of Portugal; Kingdom of Navarre; Kingdom of France; Kingdom of England	Marinid Sultanate Emirate of Granada	End of Moroccan hegemony in the Strait of Gibraltar. No more offensive or expansion attempts against the Christian Kingdoms would be done by Marinids, being just at the defensive for the rest of the reconquista.
Gascon War (1294–1303) Location: Southwestern France	France	England	Treaty of Paris: French occupation of Aquitaine ended with royal marriages. Aquitaine becomes a fief of France.
Franco-Flemish War (1297–1305) Location: Flanders	France	County of Flanders	French Victory: Treaty of Athis-sur-Orge; Flanders cedes Lille, Douai, and Bethune to France

== Late Middle Ages ==
Conflict	Combatant 1	Combatant 2	Outcome
Peasant revolt in Flanders 1323–1328 (1323–1328): Battle of Cassel (1328); Location: Flanders	Kingdom of France; Flemish count and loyalists	Flemish rebels	French Victory
War of Saint-Sardos (1324) Location: Aquitaine	France	England	French Victory
Hundred Years' War (1337–1453): Edwardian Phase; Battle of Poitiers; Battle of Crécy; Caroline Phase; Battle of Pontvallain; Lancastrian Phase; Battle of Agincourt; Siege of Orléans; Battle of Patay; Battle of Formigny; Battle of Castillon; Location: France, England, Spain, Scotland and Low Countries	France; Burgundian State (1337–1419 and 1435–53); Kingdom of Scotland; Crown of Castile; Republic of Genoa; Kingdom of Bohemia; Crown of Aragon; Avignon Papacy (Note: Fought against England during Despenser's Crusade.)	Kingdom of England; Burgundian State (1419–35); Kingdom of Portugal; Kingdom of Navarre; Ghent Rebels (Note: Fought with England during the Caroline War.); Papal States (Note: Fought with England during Despenser's Crusade.)	French Victory: England loses all continental possessions except for the Pale of Calais
Castilian Civil War (1351–1369): Battle of Montiel; Location: Spain	Forces of Henry of Trastámara; Kingdom of France; Crown of Aragon	Forces of Peter of Castile; Kingdom of England (until 1367); Kingdom of Navarre; Kingdom of Majorca; Kingdom of Granada	Victory for Henry of Trastámara
Navarrese conquest of Albania (1376) Location: Albania	Duchy of Durazzo Kingdom of Navarre: Navarrese Company; Kingdom of France	Kingdom of Albania: Karl Thopia forces	Victory
Revolt of Ghent (1379-85) Location: Ghent, Flanders	France; Flanders; Burgundy (1384–5)	Rebels of Ghent; England (1383–5)	Victory
1383–1385 Portuguese interregnum Location: Iberia	Party of Beatrice of Portugal; Castile; France; Aragon; Genoese volunteers	Party of the Grandmaster of Avis; England	Defeat: John of Avis becomes John I of Portugal, ushering in the Johanine Dynasty; Consolidation of Portuguese independence from Castile.; Signing of the Treaty of Windsor, strengthening the Anglo-Portuguese Alliance and kickstarting the so-called "Illustrious Generation"
Invasion of Castile by John of Gaunt (1386–1388) Location: Iberia	Crown of Castile Kingdom of France	Supportes of John of Gaunt: Kingdom of Galicia; Kingdom of Portugal; Kingdom of England	Victory
Barbary Crusade (1390) Location: Tunisia	Kingdom of France; Republic of Genoa	Hafsids; Zianids; Béjaïa	Truce negotiated, Both sides claim victory
Siege of Constantinople (1394–1402) Location: Constantinople (modern-day Istanbul, Turkey)	Byzantine Empire; Kingdom of France	Ottoman Empire	Franco-Byzantine victory
Nicopolis Crusade (1396): Battle of Nicopolis; Location: Nicopolis	Crusade: Holy Roman Empire: Bohemian Crown; Duchy of Savoy; Swiss Confederacy; Kingdom of France: Duchy of Burgundy; Kingdom of Hungary: Voivodeship of Transylvania; Kingdom of Croatia; Principality of Wallachia; Knights Hospitaller; Republic of Venice; Republic of Genoa; Bulgarian Empire; Polish Crown; Crown of Castile; Crown of Aragon; Kingdom of Portugal; Kingdom of Navarre; Teutonic Order; Byzantine Empire	Ottoman Empire: Moravian Serbia	Defeat
Glyndŵr rebellion (1400-1415) Location: Wales, England	Kingdom of France Welsh rebels	England	France not involved at conclusion of War (Only involved till 1408)
Old Zurich War (1440–1446): Battle of St. Jakob an der Birs; Location: Swiss Plateau	Imperial City of Zurich; Habsburg Further Austria; France	Old Swiss Confederacy: Canton of Bern; Canton of Lucerne; Canton of Uri; Canton of Schwyz; Canton of Unterwalden; Canton of Glarus; Canton of Zug; Vogteien of Appenzell	Peace of Einsiedeln
Milanese War of Succession (1447–54) Location: Italy	House of Sforza; Duchy of Milan (1450–4); Republic of Florence (1452–4); Kingdom of France (1452–4)	Republic of Venice; Margravate of Mantua Ambrosian Republic (1447–50); Duchy of Savoy	Francesco Sforza recognised as Duke of Milan
Wars of the Roses (1455–1487): Battle of Bosworth Field; Location: England	House of Lancaster; House of Tudor; France; Kingdom of Scotland	House of York; Burgundian State	Victory and beginning of the Tudor dynasty
Catalan Civil War (1462–1472) Location: Catalonia	John II of Aragon; France	Principality of Catalonia rebels	John reestablished as King
Ottoman–Venetian War (1463–1479) Location: Morea (Peloponnese), Negroponte (Euboea), Albania, Aegean Sea, Anatolia, Balkan and the Black Sea	Republic of Venice; Papal States; Principality of Zeta; Kingdom of Hungary; Despotate of Epirus; Knights Hospitaller; Crown of Aragon; Kingdom of Naples; Aq Qoyunlu; League of Lezhë; Duchy of Burgundy; Holy Roman Empire; Principality of Moldavia; Kingdom of Croatia; Duchy of Saint Sava; Kingdom of France; Republic of Ragusa; Grand Duchy of Lithuania; Crown of Castile; Florence; Karamanids; Maniots; Greek rebels	Ottoman Empire	Ottoman victory: Treaty of Constantinople (1479); Morea, Negroponte and Albania conquered by the Ottoman Empire
Burgundian Wars (1474–1477) Location: North West Switzerland, Lorraine	Kingdom of France Old Swiss Confederacy; Duchy of Lorraine; Upper Alsace	Burgundian State	End of Valois House of Burgundy, Division of land between French Valois and Habsburgs
War of the Castilian Succession (1475–1479) Location: Spain	Joanna's supporters; Kingdom of Portugal; Kingdom of France	Isabella's supporters; Crown of Aragon	Isabella is recognised as Queen of Castile in exchange for Ferdinand breaking alliance with Maximilian I, Duke of Burgundy
War of the Burgundian Succession (1477–1482) Location: France, Low Countries	Valois-Orléans: Kingdom of France	Burgundy-Habsburg: Burgundian State	France annexes several Burgundian territories, Maximilian I retains the Netherlands, the County of Burgundy, Artois and Charolais.
Aragonese-French conflict over Perpignan (1473–1492) Location: Catalonia	Kingdom of France	Crown of Aragon	Victory
French–Breton War (1487–1491): Battle of Saint-Aubin-du-Cormier (1488); Location: Duchy of Brittany	Kingdom of France	Duchy of Brittany; Holy Roman Empire; Kingdom of England; Kingdom of Castile and León	French Victory, Anne of Brittany marries Charles VIII of France
First Italian War (1494–1498) Location: Italy	Kingdom of France: (Old Swiss Confederacy) Swiss mercenaries; Duchy of Milan (before 1495)	1494: Kingdom of Naples 1495: League of Venice; Papal States; Republic of Venice; Kingdom of Naples; Kingdoms of Spain; Duchy of Milan; Holy Roman Empire; Republic of Florence; England (1496–98); Duchy of Mantua; Republic of Genoa	Victory for the League of Venice
Guelderian War of Independence (1494–1499) Location: Duchy of Guelders	France; Papal States Guelders: Duchy of Guelders	Habsburg: Habsburg Monarchy Burgundian Netherlands; Duchy of Cleves (1498–9); Duchy of Jülich (1498–9)	Guelders Victory
Second Italian War (1499–1501): Battle of Novara; Location: Italy	France; Papal States; Venice (1499); Spain (1500); Marquisate of Saluzzo	Duchy of Milan; Naples	France conquers the Duchy of Milan

== Early Modern Period ==
Conflict	Combatant 1	Combatant 2	Outcome
Third Italian War (1502–1504) Location: Italy	France	Spain	Spanish victory, France cedes Naples
War of the League of Cambrai (1508–1516): Battle of Marignano; Location: Italy, France, England and Spain	1508–1510: League of Cambrai: Papal States; France; Holy Roman Empire; Spain; Duchy of Ferrara; 1510–1511: France; Duchy of Ferrara; 1511–1513: France; Duchy of Ferrara; Scotland; Florence; 1513–1516: France; Venice; Duchy of Ferrara	1508–1510: Venice; 1510–1511: Papal States; Venice; 1511–1513: Holy League: Papal States; Venice; Spain; Holy Roman Empire; England; (Old Swiss Confederacy) Swiss mercenaries; 1513–1516: Papal States; Spain; Holy Roman Empire; England; Duchy of Milan; (Old Swiss Confederacy) Swiss mercenaries	French and Venetian Victory
Italian War of 1521–1526: Battle of Pavia; Location: France, Italy and Spain	France: (Old Swiss Confederacy) Swiss mercenaries; Republic of Venice; Papal States (1524–1525); Marquisate of Saluzzo	Holy Roman Empire; Spain; England; Papal States (1521–1523 and 1525–1526)	Habsburg victory, capture of François I
War of the League of Cognac (1526–30) Location: Italy	Kingdom of France: (Old Swiss Confederacy) Swiss mercenaries; Papal States: (Papal States) Swiss Guards; Republic of Venice; Republic of Florence; Republic of Genoa (1526–1528); Kingdom of Navarre; Duchy of Milan	Holy Roman Empire; Spain; Duchy of Ferrara; Republic of Genoa (1528–1530); Duchy of Mantua (1528–1530)	Habsburg Victory: Treaty of Cambrai (1529); End of the Florentine Republic (1530); Transformation of Florence into a hereditary monarchy by Pope Clement VII (1532)
Ottoman-Habsburg War (1526–1533) Location:	Ottoman Empire; France	Holy Roman Empire: Archduchy of Austria; Kingdom of Bohemia; Duchy of Styria; Duchy of Carniola; Royal Hungary; Kingdom of Croatia; Spanish Empire; Papal States	Victory, * Hungary was divided into larger Ottoman and smaller Habsburg spheres of influence, as well as a semi-independent Hungarian vassal state of Transylvania.
Ottoman–Safavid War (1532–55)	Ottoman Empire; Kingdom of France (from 1547)	Safavid Empire	Victory: Ottomans gain large parts of Mesopotamia, Western Kurdistan, Western Armenia, and Western Georgia; Persians retain Tabriz, Eastern Georgia, Eastern Armenia, Eastern Kurdistan, Dagestan, and Azerbaijan and the rest of their north-western borders as they were prior to the war; Erzurum, Van, and Shahrizor become buffer zones; Kars is declared a neutral zone
Italian War of 1536–1538 Location: Provence, Piedmont and Lombardy	France; Ottoman Empire	Holy Roman Empire; Spain	Truce of Nice, Savoy and Piedmont acquired by France
Habsburg–Ottoman war of 1540–1547 Location:	Ottoman Empire; Crimean Khanate; Moldavia; France; Eastern Hungary	Habsburg Monarchy; Holy Roman Empire; Kingdom of Hungary; Papal States; Republic of Ragusa; Republic of Venice; Kingdom of Croatia; Kingdom of Bohemia; Spanish Empire	Victory
Italian War of 1542–1546 Location: England, France, Italy, Spain, and the Low Countries	France; (Old Swiss Confederacy) Swiss mercenaries; Ottoman Empire; Jülich-Cleves-Berg	Holy Roman Empire; Saxony; Brandenburg; Spain; Kingdom of England	Treaty of Crépy and Treaty of Ardres
Rough Wooing (1542–1551) Location: Northern England and Scotland	Kingdom of Scotland; Kingdom of France	Kingdom of England	Scottish and French Victory
Italian War of 1551–1559 Location: France, Flanders, Italy and the Mediterranean	Kingdom of France; (Old Swiss Confederacy) Swiss mercenaries; Republic of Siena; Ottoman Empire; Papal States	Holy Roman Empire; (Spain) Spanish Empire; Duchy of Mantua; Republic of Florence; Duchy of Savoy	Spanish-Imperial Victory
Habsburg–Ottoman war of 1551–1562 Location:	Ottoman Empire; France	Holy Roman Empire; Spain; Papal States	Victory, Treaty of Frankfurt (1562)
Second Schmalkaldic War (1552) Location: Southern Germany, Lorraine and Austria	Kingdom of France Electoral Saxony Hesse Prussia Brandenburg-Kulmbach	Holy Roman Empire: (Habsburg monarchy) Austria	French Victory, Three Bishoprics annexed by France
Invasion of Corsica (1553) (1553) Location: Corsica	France; Ottoman Empire; Corsicans	Republic of Genoa	Ottoman-French Victory
Anglo-French War (1557–1559) Location: Pale of Calais: Siege of Calais (1558)	Kingdom of France	Kingdom of England	French Victory
French Wars of Religion (1562–1628): First War (1562–1563); Second War (1567–1568); Third War (1568–1570); Fourth War (1572–1573); Fifth War (1574–1576); Sixth War (1576–1577); Seventh War (1579–1580); War of the Three Henrys; Huguenot rebellions; Location: France	France; France	Protestants: Huguenots; England; Scotland; Navarre; Catholic League; Spain; Savoy; Portugal	Edict of Nantes 1598, Edict of Fontainebleau 1685 revokes treaty of Nantes
English expedition to France (1562–1563) Location: Le Havre, Dieppe	Kingdom of France	Kingdom of England, Huguenots (Before Edict of Amboise)	Elizabeth I accepts French rule over Pale of Calais
Spanish assault on French Florida (1565) Location: Fort Caroline, Florida; Matanzas Inlet	Kingdom of France: Huguenots	Spain: New Spain	Spanish victory
Hessian War (1567–1648) Location: Upper Hesse	France; Hesse-Cassel (yes) Swedish Empire	Hesse-Darmstadt; Holy Roman Empire	Victory
Francis Drake's expedition of 1572–1573 Location: Isthmus of Panama	Kingdom of France, Kingdom of England	Spain	Anglo-French Victory
War of the Portuguese Succession (1580–1583) Location: Portugal, Atlantic Ocean, and the Azores Islands	Pro-Crato Portugal; Supported by: France; England; Dutch Republic	Spain; Pro-Philip Portugal	Spanish victory, Philip II of Spain crowned king of Portugal, Iberian Union
War of the Three Henrys (1585–1589) Location: France	(Kingdom of France) Politiques and Protestants: Huguenots; England	Catholics: Catholic League; Spain	Henry IV becomes King. Failure of Spain and Catholics.
Succession of Henry IV of France (1589–1594) Location: France	(Kingdom of France) Politiques and Protestants: Huguenots; England	Catholics: Catholic League; Spain	Henry IV recognised as King, Failure of Spanish-Catholics
Franco-Spanish War (1595–1598) (simultaneously supporting the Dutch Republic in the Eighty Years' War during 1596–98): Battle of Fontaine-Française; Siege of Le Catelet; Siege of Doullens; Siege of Calais; Siege of Amiens (1597); Location: Western Europe	Kingdom of France; England	Spain	French Victory
Franco-Savoyard War (1600–1601) Location: Savoy	Kingdom of France	Duchy of Savoy	Treaty of Lyon (1601)
War of the Jülich Succession (1609–10) Location: United Duchies of Jülich-Cleves-Berg	Margraviate of Brandenburg; Palatinate-Neuburg; United Provinces; Kingdom of France; Protestant Union	(Holy Roman Empire) Rudolph II; Principality of Strasbourg; Prince-Bishopric of Liège; Catholic League	France did not participate when war resumed in 1614
Franco-Algerian war (1609–1628) Location: Algiers	Kingdom of France	Regency of Algiers	Defeat
Portuguese conquest of Maranhão (1612-1615) Location: Maranhão, Brazil	Kingdom of France Tupinambá	Portuguese Empire Tabajara tribes Ceará tribes Potiguara tribes	Defeat: Expulsion of the French from Maranhão
War of the Montferrat Succession (1613-1617) Location: Northwestern Italy	Supporting the Duke of Savoy: Duchy of Savoy; Montferrat; Tuscany (1613); France (1615–17); Venice	Supporting the Duke of Mantua: Duchy of Mantua; Montferrat; Tuscany (1613) (Spain) Spanish Empire; France (1613–14); Holy Roman Empire; Kingdom of Naples; Genoa	Peace of Pavia
Bündner Wirren (1618–39) Location: Swiss canton of Graubünden	The Three Leagues; Kingdom of France; Venice; Duchy of Savoy	Grison rebels Holy Roman Empire (Spain)	The Three Leagues regain control of the Valtellina but allow free exercise of the Catholic faith.
Valtellina War (1620–26) Location: Valtellina	France; The Three Leagues; Venice; Savoy	Papal States; Holy Roman Empire; Spain	Treaty of Monzón
First Savoyard-Genoese War (1625) Location: Genoa	Kingdom of France; Duchy of Savoy	Spain; Republic of Genoa	Defeat
Anglo-French War (1627–1629): Siege of Saint-Martin-de-Ré; Siege of La Rochelle; Location: France, Quebec	France	England	Treaty of Susa, English withdraw support for Huguenots, status quo ante bellum in Canada
War of the Mantuan Succession (1628–31) Location: Northern Italy	Supporting the Duke of Nevers: France; Venice	Supporting the Duke of Guastalla: Holy Roman Empire; Duchy of Savoy; Spain	Victory for Duke of Nevers who is recognised as ruler of Mantua
Thirty Years' War (1618–1648) Location: Europe, primarily in Germany	France (from 1635) Bohemia (until 1620); Sweden (from 1630); Palatinate (until 1632); Duchy of Savoy (1618–19); Transylvania (until 1621); Dutch Republic (from 1619); Denmark–Norway (1625–29); Heilbronn League (1631–1635); Hesse-Kassel (from 1629); Brandenburg–Prussia (1631–1635) (Note: Reconciled with the Emperor and switched sides in the Peace of Prague (1635).); Brunswick–Lüneburg (1634–1642); Saxony (1630–1635)	Habsburg Monarchy (Spain) Spanish Empire; Electorate of Bavaria; Catholic League (1618–1635) Supported by: Polish–Lithuanian Commonwealth; Papal States	France annexes Décapole and Upper Alsace: Peace of Westphalia
Franco-Spanish War (1635–1659) (simultaneously supporting the Dutch Republic in the Eighty Years' War during 1635–48) Location: Northern France, Catalonia, Spanish Netherlands, Northern Italy, the Rhineland	Kingdom of France; Dutch Republic (1635–48); Commonwealth of England (1654–59); Duchy of Savoy; Modena and Reggio (1647–49, 1655–59); Duchy of Parma (1635–37); Principality of Catalonia (1640–41); Catalan Republic (1641)	Spanish Empire; Holy Roman Empire (1635–48); Modena and Reggio (1635–46); English Royalists (1657–59) (Note: Lord Wentworth's Regiment was integrated into the Spanish army.)	Treaty of the Pyrenees; France annexes Artois in addition to other smaller territories from the Spanish Netherlands and Roussillon
Piedmontese Civil War (1639–1642) Location:Piedmont	France (Duchy of Savoy) Madamisti faction	(Duchy of Savoy) Principisti faction Spain	Christina becomes regent. France maintains garrisons in Turin, Pinerolo and Casale. Thomas pledges himself to fight for France.
War of Candia (1645–1669): Siege of Candia; Location: Cretan	Venice; Knights of Malta; Papal States; France	Ottoman Empire	Defeat: Crete conquered by the Ottoman Empire; Venetian gains in Dalmatia
English Invasion of Acadia (1654) Location: Acadia	France: New France	Commonwealth of England: New England Confederation	Defeat: Acadia becomes an English colony from 1654 to 1667
Savoyard–Waldensian wars (1655–1690) Location: Piedmont, Duchy of Savoy	Duchy of Savoy; Kingdom of France (1686–1690)	Waldensian rebels	Status quo: Waldensians resettle their valleys; Savoyard-Waldensian alliance against France, Savoy joins Augsburg League; Edict of Reintegration 1694
Austro-Turkish War (1663–1664): Battle of Saint Gotthard (1664); Djidjelli expedition; Location: Kingdom of Hungary	League of the Rhine: Kingdom of France; Holy Roman Empire: Electorate of Saxony; Brandenburg–Prussia; Electorate of Bavaria; Baden-Baden; Swabia; Piedmont-Savoy; Kingdom of Hungary; Kingdom of Croatia; Polish–Lithuanian Commonwealth	Ottoman Empire	Peace of Vasvár
Second Anglo-Dutch War (1665–1667) Location: Europe, Caribbean, North Sea and English Channel	Dutch Republic; Denmark–Norway; France	England; Scotland; Münster	Treaty of Breda
War of Devolution (1667–1668) Location: Spanish Netherlands, Franche-Comté, Northern Catalonia	France	(Spain) Spanish Empire (incl. Spanish Netherlands) Triple Alliance: Dutch Republic; Kingdom of England; (Sweden) Swedish Empire	Treaty of Aix-la-Chapelle (1668), France gains Armentières, Bergues, Charleroi, Kortrijk, Douai, Veurne, Lille, Oudenaarde and Tournai
Revolts of the Angelets (1667–1675) Location: Roussillon	France	Northern Catalonia's peasants Supported by: Spain	Consolidation of French hegemony in the Eastern Pyrenees
Kandyan–Dutch war (1670–1675) Location: Sri Lanka, Indian Ocean	Kingdom of Kandy; France	Dutch Republic: Dutch East India Company	Defeat: French expelled from all occupied territories; Expansion of Dutch Ceylon, and Rajasinha's offensives repelled
Franco-Dutch War (1672–1678) Location: Low Countries, England, Alsace, Rhineland, Brandenburg, Sicily, France, North America, West Indies	France; England (1672–74); Münster (1672–1673); Cologne (1672–1673)	Dutch Republic; Holy Roman Empire (from 1673); Spain (from 1673); Brandenburg–Prussia (from 1673); Lorraine (from 1673); Denmark–Norway (from 1674); England (1678)	Treaties of Nijmegen, France gains Franche-Comté
Scanian War (1675–1679) Location: Scandinavia	Swedish Empire; Kingdom of France	(Denmark–Norway) Denmark-Norway; Dutch Republic; Brandenburg-Prussia; Habsburg Monarchy; Spanish Empire	French Political Success. Denmark-Swedish result disputed
War of the Reunions (1683–1684) Location: Spanish Netherlands, Catalonia, Genoa	France	*Holy Roman Empire Spain Republic of Genoa	French Victory, Spain cedes Luxembourg to France; Holy Roman Empire cedes Strasbourg to France
French conquest of Senegal (1659–1895) Location: Senegal	France	Waalo Kingdom; Kingdom of Cayor; Jolof Empire; Baol; Kingdom of Sine; Saloum	French victory: France conquers territory of present-day Senegal
French–Tripolitania War (1681–1685) Location: Chios, Tripoli and Tunis	France	Tripolitania; Tunis	French victory
French-Algerian War 1681–88 (1681–88) Location: Algiers	France	Regency of Algiers	Peace treaty
Siamese revolution of 1688 (1688) Location: Siam	Prasat Thong dynasty France: French East India Company	Phetracha and various Siamese lords Supported by: Dutch East India Company	French defeat: Establishment of Ban Phlu Luang dynasty; Expulsion of French troops in Bangkok
Nine Years' War: King William's War (1688–1697); Williamite War in Ireland; Location: Europe, Ireland, Asia, North America	France; New France; Wabanaki Confederacy; Jacobites	Grand Alliance: Dutch Republic; England; Holy Roman Empire; Spanish Empire; Duchy of Savoy	Treaty of Ryswick
French and Iroquois Wars (17th century) Location: Great Lakes region	Wendat (Huron_, Erie, Neutral, Odawa, Ojibwe, Mississaugas, Potawatomi, Algonquin, Shawnee, Wenro, Mahican, Innu, Abenaki, Miami, Illinois Confederation, other nations allied with France; Supported by: France	Haudenosaunee; Supported by: England; Dutch Republic	Military stalemate: Great Peace of Montreal; Growth of French token influence in the Great Lakes region; Huron-Wendat Confederacy destroyed or assimilated; Military refugee migration results in expansion of Iroquois hunting grounds down to Mississippi River; Further Iroquois territorial expansion halted in military campaigns by the Council of Three Fires
War of the Spanish Succession (1701–1714): Queen Anne's War; Rákóczi's War of Independence; Battle of Blenheim; Battle of Denain; Location: Europe, North America, Asia, Africa	* France: Bourbon Spain; Bavaria (until 1704); Savoy (until 1703); Cologne (until 1702); Liège (until 1702)	Holy Roman Empire: Great Britain; Dutch Republic; Pro-Habsburg Spain; Prussia (from 1702); Savoy (after 1703); Portugal (from 1703)	Treaty of Utrecht, Treaty of Portsmouth: Philip of the House of Bourbon becomes Philip V of Spain; Partition of Spanish holdings in Europe; France cedes territories in North America to Britain
First Fox War (1712–1716) Location: Detroit	Kingdom of France and Indigenous Allies	Fox Peoples	French victory
War of the Catalans (1713–1714) Location: Catalonia	Kingdom of France and Pro-Bourbon Spain	Principality of Catalonia	Bourbon victory
Spanish-French anti-piracy expedition in the Pacific (1716–1728) Location: South Pacific (Cape Horn to Panama)	France (Spain) Spanish Empire	Pirates	Victory
War of the Quadruple Alliance (1718–1720) Location: Europe, North America	Great Britain; France; Austria; Dutch Republic; Savoy	Spain	Allied victory
Basque rebellion of 1718 (1718) Location: Basque Country	Kingdom of France Basques	(Spain) Spanish Empire	Victory: Royal decree of August 21, 1717 is abolished.; It's negotiated new customs and taxes according to the Fueros of the Basque señoríos, leading to the Capitulation of 1727.
Chickasaw Wars (1721–1763) Location: Mississippi River	France; Choctaw; Illini	Great Britain; Chickasaw	Chickasaw victory: Treaty of Paris
Second Fox War (1728–1733) Location: Detroit	Kingdom of France and Indigenous Allies	Fox Peoples	French victory
1733 slave insurrection on St. John (1733) Location: Danish West Indies	Denmark–Norway; Great Britain; France	Rebel slaves (Akwamu natives	Victory
Affair of Porto Novo (1733) Location: Porto Novo	France; Great Britain	Swedish East India Company	Victory
War of the Polish Succession (1733–1735) Location: Poland, Rhineland, Italy	* Poland loyal to Stanislaus I: France; Spain; (Duchy of Savoy) Savoy–Sardinia; Duchy of Parma	* Poland loyal to Augustus III: Russia; Holy Roman Empire; Habsburg Monarchy; Saxony; Prussia	Treaty of Vienna, Bourbon territorial gains, France guaranteed Lorraine following death of Stanisław Leszczyński
War of Austrian Succession (1740–48): King George's War (1744–1748); First Carnatic War; Jacobite rising of 1745; Battle of Fontenoy; Location: Europe, North America	*France: New France; Wabanaki Confederacy: Prussia (1740–42, 1744–45); Spain; Bavaria (1741–45); Saxony (1741–42); Savoy-Sardinia (1741–42); Genoa (1745–48); Sweden (1741–43); Duchy of Modena	*Great Britain: British America; Iroquois Confederacy: Habsburg Monarchy; Great Britain; (Province of Hanover) Hanover; Dutch Republic; Co-belligerents: Saxony (1743–45); Savoy-Sardinia (1742–48); Russia (1741–43, 1748)	Status quo: Treaty of Aix-la-Chapelle
Father Le Loutre's War (1749–1755) Location: Acadia and Nova Scotia	France: New France; Wabanaki Confederacy: Mi'kmaw militia; Maliseet militia	Great Britain: British America	French defeat
Second Carnatic War (1749–1754) Location: Indian subcontinent	(Kingdom of France) French East India Company; Forces of Chanda Shahib; Forces of Muhyi ad-Din Muzaffar Jang Hidayat	East India Company; Forces of Nasir Jang Mir Ahmad; Forces of Mohamed Ali Khan Walajan	French defeat
Seven Years' War (1756–1763): French and Indian War (1754–1763); Third Carnatic War; Location: Europe, North America, Asia; St. Lawrence and Mohawk theater; Battle of the Plains of Abraham; Battle of Plassey; West Indies Campaign (1757–1762); Location: West Indies; West African Campaign; Location: West Africa	France: New France; Wabanaki Confederacy: Abenaki; Mi'kmaw militia; Algonquin; Lenape; Ojibwe; Odwa; Shawnee; Wyandot	Great Britain: British America; Iroquois Confederacy; Catawba; Cherokee (before 1758)	French defeat
Larache expedition (1765) Location: Larache, Morocco	France	Morocco	French defeat
War of the Bar Confederation (1768-1772) Location: Polish-Lithuanian Commonwealth	(Polish–Lithuanian Commonwealth) Bar Confederation; Ottoman Empire; France (from 1770)	Polish–Lithuanian Commonwealth (royal crown regiments); Russian Empire	Russian and Stanislaus' victory: First partition of Poland
French conquest of Corsica (1768–1770) Location: Corsica	France	Corsican Republic	French victory
Tây Sơn wars (1771-1802) Location: Vietnam, Laos, Cambodia, South China Sea	Nguyễn lords Kingdom of Cambodia; Siam; France (1778–1802, limited); Kingdom of Vientiane; Chinese Vietnamese (Hoà Nghĩa army)	Tây Sơn; Cham people Chinese Vietnamese (1771–1777); Pirates of the South China Coast	French victory: Đại Việt united under Emperor Gia Long; Phú Xuân became the capital of new dynasty; Start of Nguyễn Dynasty
Anglo-French War (1778–1783) (1778–83): American Revolutionary War; Battle of the Chesapeake; Siege of Yorktown (1781); Location: English Channel, Atlantic Ocean, West Indies, North America, Straits of Gibraltar, Balearic Islands, East Indies	France; Spain; United States Co-belligerent: Dutch Republic (1780–1784)	Great Britain	French victory: United States gain independence from Britain; France weakens Britain, but incurs huge debts; Dutch economy ruined, Patriots radicalise
Second Anglo-Mysore War (1780–1784) Location: Mysore	France; Kingdom of Mysore	East India Company Maratha Empire; Hyderabad State	Status quo ante bellum
Avignon–Comtat Venaissin War (1790–1791) Location: Avignon	Revolutionary Avignon municipal government Kingdom of France	Papal States: Comtat Venaissin; Union of St. Cecilia (from 1791)	French victory, Avignon and Comtat Venaissin annexed into France
War of the First Coalition (1792–1797) Location: France, Central Europe, Italy, Belgium, Netherlands, Spain, West Indies	France: Batavian Republic (from 1795) (Note: The French Revolutionary Army overthrew the Dutch Republic and established the Batavian Republic as a puppet state in its place.); Polish Legions (from 1797) (Note: Formed in French-allied Italy in 1797, following the abolition of the Polish–Lithuanian Commonwealth after the Third Partition in 1795.); (Kingdom of Italy (Napoleonic)) Sister Republics; Spain (from 1796) (Note: Re-entered the war as an ally of France after signing the Second Treaty of San Ildefonso.)	(Kingdom of France) Army of Condé Dutch Republic (until 1795); Great Britain; Holy Roman Empire (until 1797) (Note: Nominally the Holy Roman Empire, of which the Austrian Netherlands and the Duchy of Milan were under direct Austrian rule. Also encompassed many other Italian states, as well as other House of Habsburg states such as the Grand Duchy of Tuscany and Liechtenstein): Habsburg monarchy (until 1797) (Note: Left the war after signing the Peace of Leoben with France.); Prussia (until 1795) (Note: Left the war after signing the Peace of Basel with France.); Naples (until 1796); Portugal; Sardinia (until 1796) (Note: Left the war after signing the Treaty of Paris with France.); Spain (until 1795) (Note: Left the war after signing the Peace of Basel with France.); Other Italian states	French victory: French annexation of the Austrian Netherlands, the Left Bank of the Rhine, Savoy, and other smaller territories; Santo Domingo to France; French sister republics established; End of millennial Venetian independence

== Civil wars and revolts ==
Conflict	French Government	Rebels	Outcome
First Norman Rebellion against William (1047) Location: Normandy	Kingdom of France; Duchy of Normandy	Norman rebels	French-Norman victory, rebels defeated
Second Norman Rebellion against William (1052–1054) Location: Normandy	Kingdom of France; Norman rebels	Duchy of Normandy	Norman victory, French and rebels defeated
War of the Flemish succession (1070–1071) (1070–1071) Location: County of Flanders	Pro-Arnulf Flanders; Kingdom of France; County of Hainaut; County of Boulogne; Duchy of Normandy	Pro-Robert Flanders; West Frisia (later County of Holland)	West Frisian victory: Robert the Frisian becomes Count of Flanders
Shepherds' Crusade (1251) Location: France	Kingdom of France; Catholic Church in France; Civilians (especially Jews)	French peasant crusaders	French government victory: Crusaders dispersed
Shepherds' Crusade (1320) Location: France, Crown of Aragon	Kingdom of France; Crown of Aragon; Civilians (especially Jews)	French peasant crusaders	Franco–Aragonese victory: Crusaders dispersed
War of the Public Weal (1465): Battle of Montlhéry; Location: France	Kingdom of France Loyal Nobles: Duchy of Anjou; County of Maine; Count of Nevers; County of Vendôme; Counts of Eu; Supported by: Duchy of Milan	Rebellious nobles: Duchy of Berry; Duchy of Bourbon; Duchy of Brittany; Duchy of Lorraine; Duchy of Nemours; County of Armagnac; County of Saint-Pol; County of Dunois; County of Dammartin; County of Albret; Supported by: Burgundian State; Palatinate; Duchy of Cleves	Rebellious nobles victory: Louis made concessions to the rebels in the Treaty of Conflans, Treaty of Saint-Maur and Treaty of Caen, before going back on them in the following years.
Mad War (1485–1488) Location: France	Kingdom of France	Duchy of Lorraine; Duchy of Brittany; Lordship of Albret; Principality of Orange; County of Angoulême; Supported by: Holy Roman Empire; Kingdom of England; Kingdom of Castile-León	Royal victory
The Fronde (1648-1653) Location: France	Kingdom of France	Parlements (1648–1649); Princes of the Blood (1650–1653); Spanish Empire	Royal victory
War in the Cevennes (1702–1710) Location: Cévennes	Kingdom of France	Camisards	Royal victory
French Revolution (1789–1799) Location: France	Kingdom of France: Catholic and Royal Army; Chouans; Armée des Émigrés	Revolutionaries: Jacobins; Cordeliers; Girondins; Sans-culottes; Thermidorians	French Republican victory: Establishment of the French First Republic (1792); Execution of Louis XVI (1793); Thermidorian Reaction (1794); French Directory (1795); Coup of 18 Brumaire (1799)
Haitian Revolution (1791–1804) Location: Saint-Domingue: Saint-Domingue expedition; Battle of Ravine-à-Couleuvres; Battle of Crête-à-Pierrot; Blockade of Saint-Domingue; Battle of Vertières	Slave owners Kingdom of France; French Republic	Ex-slaves; French royalists Captaincy General of Santo Domingo (1793–1795); Great Britain; Ex-slaves (1802–1803)	Haitian victory: French colonial government expelled; Massacre of the French; French occupation of Santo Domingo

== See also ==
- Anglo-French Wars
- Franco-Spanish War (disambiguation)
- List of battles involving France (disambiguation)
- List of wars involving Francia (France before 987)
- List of wars involving France (France after September 1792: First to Fifth Republic, First and Second Empire, Bourbon Restoration, July Monarchy, and Vichy France)
- List of wars in the Low Countries until 1560
- List of wars in the southern Low Countries (1560–1829)
- Military history of France
