= Clausula de Pippino =

The Clausula de Unctione Pippini is a brief account of the election, coronation and consecration of Pippin the Short as King of the Franks and Roman patrician in 751–54. It was probably written at Saint-Denis in 767, shortly before Pippin's death. Although its authenticity was doubted early, and doubts are still occasionally raised, it has been generally received as authentic since the nineteenth century. It is the earliest source for the events it narrates, pre-dating the account of Einhard, who probably made use of it, by several decades.

The coronation ceremony of Pippin included his two young sons, Charles and Carloman, and his queen, Bertrada. According to the Clausula, Pope Stephen II:

. . . blessed the Queen Bertrada and the nobles of the Frankish nation, and while confirming them in the grace of the Holy Spirit, he bound them under penalty of interdict and excommunication never to presume to elect a king who should come forth from the loins of any other than these persons whom Divine Providence had raised to the throne, and who through the intercession of the holy Apostles had been consecrated and confirmed by the hands of their vicar, the pope.

== Editions ==
- Krusch, Bruno, ed. “Clausula de Pippino rege”. Monumenta Germaniae Historica, Scriptores rerum merovingicarum, 1/2 (Hanover, 1885): 465–66.
- Waitz, Georg, ed. “De unctione Pippini regis nota monachi sancti Dionysii”. Monumenta Germaniae Historica, Scriptores, 15/1 (Hanover, 1887): 1.
