= Siege of Bourges (762) =

Date	762
Location	Bourges
Result	Frankish victory

Belligerents
Francia	Duchy of Aquitaine

Commanders and leaders
Pepin the Short	Count Chunibert of Bourges (POW)

Strength
Frankish army	Waiofar's men Gascon levies

Casualties and losses
	Many killed and wounded Gascon levies and their families captured Waiofar's men let go

The siege of Bourges was a Frankish siege of the Aquitanian fortress town of Bourges in 762 during the Aquitanian War. The Frankish army under King Pepin the Short invested the fort with lines of circumvallation, contravallation and siege engines. The walls were breached and the fort taken. Count Chunibert of Bourges swore his loyalty to Pepin along with his Gascon levies and their families. Pepin appointed several counts of his own to garrison the place and the Frankish army went on to besiege Thouars.

== Prelude ==
After his conquest and devastation of Aquitanian Auvergne in 761, King Pepin the Short of Francia gathered his army and besieged Bourges in 762. The garrison, commanded by Count Chunibert of Bourges, included both Duke Waiofar of Aquitaine's men and Gascon levies with their families.

== Siege ==
Pepin's army invested the fort on all sides with field fortifications and pillaged the surrounding countryside. Pepin then had a second line of fortifications built, either against the fort or the countryside, preventing anyone from getting in or out of the town and protecting the besiegers and their equipment. The town was subsequently surrounded with siege engines and a rampart was built to protect the machines. The town walls were breached and after many had been wounded and more killed, the town fell.

== Aftermath ==
Pepin restored the town to his rule. He allowed Waiofar's men to live and told them to go home. Count Chunibert and the Gascon levies were made to swear their fealty to the king and remain in his presence. The wives and children of the Gascon levies were ordered to march on foot to Francia. Pepin used his craftsmen and supplies to repair the walls and left counts of his own to hold the place, implying a garrison of at least several hundred soldiers. Pepin's next operation was the Siege of Thouars (762).

== Bibliography ==
- Bachrach, Bernard (1974). "Military Organization in Aquitaine under the Early Carolingians". Speculum. 49 (1): 1–33. doi:10.2307/2856549. JSTOR 2856549. S2CID 162218193.
- Petersen, Leif Inge Ree (2013). Siege Warfare and Military Organization in the Successor States (400-800 AD): Byzantium, the West and Islam. Leiden: Brill Publishers. ISBN 978-90-04-25199-1.
- Royal Frankish Annals (1970). Royal Frankish Annals and Nithard's Histories. Translated by Scholz, B.W. Ann Arbor: University of Michigan Press. ISBN 0-472-06186-0.
