= Siege of Clermont (761) =

Frankish siege during the Aquitanian War

Date	761
Location	Clermont, Auvergne
Result	Frankish victory

Belligerents
Francia	Duchy of Aquitaine

Commanders and leaders
Pepin the Short	Count Bladinus of Auvergne (POW)

Casualties and losses
Light	Gascon levies killed or captured Civilian population burned alive

The siege of Clermont was a Frankish siege of the Aquitanian fortress of Clermont in 761 during the Aquitanian War. The Frankish army under King Pepin the Short burned the fortress, with a large number of men, women and children dying in the flames. The Count of Auvergne, Bladinus, was taken prisoner and put in chains, while his Gascon levies were killed or captured by the Franks.

== Prelude ==
After conquering Bourbon earlier in 761 and devastating Aquitaine, King Pepin the Short of Francia advanced with his entire army on Clermont in the region of Auvergne. The fort was defended by Count Bladinus of Auvergne with a levy of Gascon soldiers.

== Siege ==
Pepin's army conquered the fortified town and set it on fire. A large number of men, women and children were burned alive in the flames. The massacre is mentioned by the continuator of the Chronicle of Fredegar but not by the Royal Frankish Annals. The Gascon levies in the garrison were either killed or captured. Count Bladinus was captured and brought in chains to Pepin.

== Aftermath ==
Pepin's army was "unscathed", according to the continuator of Fredegar. That same year, Pepin also took the fort of Chantelle in battle. The Frankish army penetrated as far as Limoges, burning and destroying as it went and then returned with home with much plunder.

== Bibliography ==
- Bachrach, Bernard (1974). "Military Organization in Aquitaine under the Early Carolingians". Speculum. 49 (1): 1–33. doi:10.2307/2856549. JSTOR 2856549. S2CID 162218193.
- Petersen, Leif Inge Ree (2013). Siege Warfare and Military Organization in the Successor States (400-800 AD): Byzantium, the West and Islam. Leiden: Brill Publishers. ISBN 978-90-04-25199-1.
- Royal Frankish Annals (1970). Royal Frankish Annals and Nithard's Histories. Translated by Scholz, B.W. Ann Arbor: University of Michigan Press. ISBN 0-472-06186-0.
