= List of wars involving Francia =

This is a list of wars involving Francia. It is an incomplete list of Frankish wars and battles from the Frankish conquest of Turnacum and Cameracum by Chlodio and the establishment of the Frankish realm by Clovis I, the Merovingian king who united all the Frankish tribes and northern Gallo-Romans in the 5th century. It includes the Carolingian Empire (c. 800–888) and its three successor states:

- West Francia (Note: West Francia is considered first separate polity of France in the history.) (843–987), becoming the Kingdom of France, see List of wars involving the Kingdom of France;
- Middle Francia (843–855), splitting into Lotharingia (855–959), Lower Burgundy and the medieval Kingdom of Italy by the Treaty of Prüm; and
- East Francia (843–962), becoming the Holy Roman Empire, see List of wars involving the Holy Roman Empire.

For a detailed overview of battles, see List of battles involving the Franks and Francia.

Frankish victory
Frankish defeat
Another result *

*e.g. a treaty or peace without a clear result, status quo ante bellum, result of civil or internal conflict, result unknown or indecisive, inconclusive

== Francia (5th century–843) ==
Conflict and date	Combatant 1	Combatant 2	Result
Frankish invasion of 388 Location: Gallia Belgica	Ripuarian Franks	Roman Empire	Roman victory
Castinus campaign against the Franks Location: Gallia Belgica	Ripuarian Franks	Roman Empire	Roman victory
Vandal-Frankish war Location: near Mainz	Vandals and Alans	Ripuarian Franks	Vandal victory
Frankish War (428) Location: Gallia Belgica	Salian Franks	Roman Empire	Roman victory
Frankish War (431-432) Location: Gallia Belgica	Salian Franks	Roman Empire	Roman victory
Frankish War (441–446) (c. 448) Location: Gallia Belgica	Salian Franks	Roman Empire	Roman victory
Franco-Roman War of 486	Francia	Roman Empire	Frankish victory
First Franco-Visigothic war (496–498) Location: Aquitaine, Provence,	Francia	Visigothic Kingdom	Visigothic victory
Burgundian Civil War	Francia	Kingdom of the Burgundians	Frankish victory
Franco-Gothic War (508-511) Location: Aquitaine, Provence, Burgundy	Francia	Visigothic Kingdom	Frankish victory, Gallia Aquitania annexed by Franks
Frankish-Burgundian War (523–533) Location: France	Francia	Kingdom of the Burgundians	Frankish victory
Battle of the Unstrut River (531) (531) Location: Thuringia	Francia	Thuringii	Frankish victory
Gothic War (535–554) Location: Italy, Dalmatia	Ostrogoths, Franks, Alamanni, Burgundians	East Roman Empire, Huns, Heruli, Sclaveni, Lombards	Byzantine victory: Short-term East Roman conquest of Italy; Long-term devastation of Italy
Conquest of the Alemanni (536) Location: Upper Rhine	Francia	Alemanni	Frankish victory
Conquest of Bavaria (555) Location: Bavaria	Francia	Baiuvarii	Frankish victory
Fredegund–Brunhilda wars, or Merovingian throne struggle (568–613) Location: Francia	Neustria (Fredegund)	Austrasia (Brunhilda)	Victory for Fredegund's son, Chlothar II of Neustria
Frisian–Frankish wars (7th century–793) Location: Low Countries	Francia	Frisian Kingdom	Frankish victory
Neustrian war of succession (673) Location: Neustria	Neustria (Ebroin)	Neustrian rebel noblemen Austrasia (Childeric II)	Victory for Childeric II of Austrasia
Frankish war of succession (675–679) Location: Francia	Neustria (Ebroin)	Austrasia (Pepin II & Martin)	Victory for Ebroin of Neustria
Neustrian invasion of Austrasia (686–687) Location: Francia	Neustria (Berchar)	Austrasia (Pepin II)	Victory for Pepin II of Austrasia
Frankish Civil War (fr, nl) (715–719) Location: Francia	Carolingian faction (Austrasian); Charles Martel; Chlothar IV (717–718) Pippinid faction (Austrasian); Theudoald (715–717); Plectrude (715–717)	Neustrian faction Ragenfrid; Dagobert III (†715); Chilperic II; Redbad of Frisia (716–718); Odo of Aquitaine (independent until 718)	Carolingian victory (Charles Martel): Neustrians defeat Pippinids (715); Charles subjects Pippinids, enthrones Chlothar (717); Carolingians defeat Neustrians (718); Chlothar dies, Charles recognises Chilperic as king but gains de facto power as palace mayor, establishing the Carolingian dynasty (718)
Umayyad invasion of Gaul (719–759) Location: Southern Gaul	Francia Kingdom of the Lombards	Umayyad Caliphate Andalusi commanders (as of 750)	Frankish victory
Siege of Laon (741) Location: Francia	Carloman; Pepin the Short	Grifo	Carloman/Pepin victory: Grifo imprisoned and excluded from inheritance
War against the Lombards (755–758) Location: Lombardy	Francia	Lombards	Donation of Pepin
War of Aquitaine (761–768) Location: Aquitaine	Francia	Aquitani	Frankish victory
Saxon Wars (772–804) Location: Low Countries, Germania	Francia	Saxons	Frankish victory
War against the Lombards (773–774) Location: Lombardy	Francia	Lombards	Frankish victory: Annexation of the Lombard Kingdom
War against the Avars and Slavs (791–805) Location: Pannonia	Francia; Carolingian Empire (800)	Avars & Slavs	Frankish victory
Carolingian wars of succession (830–842) (Note: This was a series of armed conflicts in the late Frankish Carolingian Empire about the (future) succession of emperor Louis the Pious.) Location: Francia (including Field of Lies and Battle of Fontenoy (841))	Louis the Pious (died 840); Charles the Bald	Lothair I Louis the German Pepin I of Aquitaine (died 838)	Treaty of Verdun (August 843): Francia split into : West Francia – Charles the Bald; Middle Francia (Lotharingia) – Lothair I; East Francia – Louis the German
Viking raids in the Rhineland (834–843) Location: Francia	Carolingian Empire, later: West Francia; Middle Francia (Lotharingia); East Francia	Vikings	(see West Francia, Middle Francia and Lotharingia, and East Francia)

== West Francia (843–987) ==
Conflict and date	Combatant 1	Combatant 2	Result
Viking raids in the Rhineland (continued) (843–923) Location: Francia	Carolingian Empire, later West Francia	Vikings	Vikings sack Paris in 845, but fail to take Paris in 885–6; Eventual West Frankish victory at Siege of Chartres (911); Establishment of Duchy of Normandy; Rollo swears vassalage to Robert I of France, converts to Christianity
Frankish–Breton war (843–851) Location: West Francia	Carolingian Empire	Duchy of Brittany	Breton victory in Battle of Jengland: Treaty of Angers 851

== Middle Francia and Lotharingia (843–959) ==
Conflict and date	Combatant 1	Combatant 2	Result
Viking raids in the Rhineland (continued) (843–891) Location: Rhinelands	Middle Francia, later Lotharingia	Vikings	Eventual Lotharingian victory: Viking devastation of cities such as Dorestad; The Battle of Leuven (891) expelled the remaining Vikings

== East Francia (843–962) ==
Conflict and date	Combatant 1	Combatant 2	Result
Viking raids in the Rhineland (continued) (843–885) Location: East Francia	Carolingian Empire, later East Francia	Vikings	Eventual East Frankish victory: Henry, Margrave of the Franks defeated most Vikings in East Francia by 885, but then died in the Viking Siege of Paris (885–886)
First Italian Expedition of Otto I (951–952)	East Francia	Kingdom of Italy	East Frankish victory Berengar II recognized the suzerainty of Otto I
Second Italian Expedition of Otto I (961–962)	East Francia	Kingdom of Italy	East Frankish victory Berengar II is deposed. Otto I is crowned King of Italy and later Roman Emperor, in retrospect forming the Holy Roman Empire
