= Siege of Thouars (762) =

Date	762
Location	Thouars
Result	Frankish victory

Belligerents
Francia	Duchy of Aquitaine

Commanders and leaders
Pepin the Short	Count of Thouars (POW)

Casualties and losses
	Gascon levies captured

The siege of Thouars was a Frankish siege of the Aquitanian stronghold of Thouars in 762 during the Aquitanian War. The Frankish army under King Pepin the Short besieged and captured the fort with great speed, burning the place to the ground, taking the count of Thouars captive and deporting him and Thouars' Gascon levies to Francia.

== Prelude ==
After the siege and conquest of Aquitanian Bourges in 762, King Pepin the Short of Francia army moved on to besiege Thouars. The garrison was commanded by the count of Thouars and included Gascon levies.

== Siege ==
The stronghold was taken with great speed and burned after the siege.

== Aftermath ==
The Count of Thouars and the Gascon levies were taken along to Francia, as Pepin's army departed home with its plunder from the campaign.

== Bibliography ==
- Bachrach, Bernard (1974). "Military Organization in Aquitaine under the Early Carolingians". Speculum. 49 (1): 1–33. doi:10.2307/2856549. JSTOR 2856549. S2CID 162218193.
- Petersen, Leif Inge Ree (2013). Siege Warfare and Military Organization in the Successor States (400-800 AD): Byzantium, the West and Islam. Leiden: Brill Publishers. ISBN 978-90-04-25199-1.
- Royal Frankish Annals (1970). Royal Frankish Annals and Nithard's Histories. Translated by Scholz, B.W. Ann Arbor: University of Michigan Press. ISBN 0-472-06186-0.
