= Siege of Chantelle (761) =

Frankish siege during the Aquitanian War

Date	761
Location	Chantelle
Result	Frankish victory

Belligerents
Francia	Duchy of Aquitaine

Commanders and leaders
Pepin the Short	

The siege of Chantelle was a Frankish siege of the Aquitanian fortress of Chantelle in 761 during the Aquitanian War. The Frankish army under King Pepin the Short took the fortress in battle. Pepin's army went on to Limoges, laying waste to the province.

== Prelude ==
In 761, King Pepin the Short of Francia took the fortified towns of Bourbon and Clermont and devastated and looted the Duchy of Aquitaine.

== Siege ==
During the campaign, the fort of Chantelle was taken in battle, according to the Royal Frankish Annals.

== Aftermath ==
Many other castles in Auvergne surrendered to Pepin without a fight during the campaign. Pepin proceeded as far as Limoges, burning and looting the province. The conquest and destruction of Auvergne was now complete.

== Bibliography ==
- Bachrach, Bernard (1974). "Military Organization in Aquitaine under the Early Carolingians". Speculum. 49 (1): 1–33. doi:10.2307/2856549. JSTOR 2856549. S2CID 162218193.
- Petersen, Leif Inge Ree (2013). Siege Warfare and Military Organization in the Successor States (400-800 AD): Byzantium, the West and Islam. Leiden: Brill Publishers. ISBN 978-90-04-25199-1.
- Royal Frankish Annals (1970). Royal Frankish Annals and Nithard's Histories. Translated by Scholz, B.W. Ann Arbor: University of Michigan Press. ISBN 0-472-06186-0.
