= Frankish campaign against the Thuringians (491) =

491 AD military campaign in Europe

A Frankish campaign against the Thoringi is said to have taken place around 491 AD, and resulted in a defeat for the latter. These Thoringi are usually identified as the Thuringi (or 'Thuringians').

== Reconstruction ==
Reconstructed map of the conquests of Clovis. Note the question marks in Germany.

Five years after the Frankish king, Clovis I, ascended to the throne, he set about extending his influence over, not just over other Frankish kingdoms, but also over other Germanic tribes, including the Alemanni and Thuringians. In 486, Clovis advanced deep into Gaul with other Salian kings, and attached and defeated their last Roman ruler, Syagrius, at Soissons in 486. Thereafter he embarked on a campaign against the Burgundians, before turning on the Thuringians.

The only source for this event is a single sentence written by the 6th-century historian Gregory of Tours, who records that Clovis "conquered the Thoringi" in the tenth year of his reign (dated to 491–492):

Nam decimo regni sui anno Thoringis bellum intulit eosdemque suis diccionibus subiugavit.
In the tenth year of his reign he [=Clovis] made war on the Thoringi and brought them under his dominion.

— Gregory of Tours, History of the Franks (Book 2, Chapter 27)

According to Bachrach (2001), this event should be situated in the area of the modern-day state of Hesse. This tribe, whose 'heartland' Bachrach claimed was further east, was bounded to the north by Frisia, to the south by Alemannia and to the east by the River Weser, on the far side of which was part of Saxony.

Most scholars think the territory of this particular Thuringian group was absorbed into the Frankish kingdom; however, the 'main region' of the Thuringians was not conquered until 531 when Clovis's sons, Chlotar I and Theudebert I, subjected them.

== Alternative views ==
Guy Halsall (2007) cast doubt on the reliability of the passage in the History of the Franks, because 'the Thuringians clearly retained their independence' and were not fully subjected by the Franks until 531–4. He stated that 'Clovis' alleged victory over and subjection of the Thuringians' is 'probably unlikely', and pointed out that scholars disagree about the size of the Thuringian kingdom, with some arguing for 'a 'Greater Thuringia' stretching from the Elbe to the mouth of the Rhine and including the Saxon areas', while others hold a minimal view that restricts the Thuringian kingdom to a 'core area' in modern eastern Germany, with the river Unstrut as its southwestern limit. Finally, Halsall adds that the event cannot be dated. Despite the 10th regnal year of Clovis provided by Gregory of Tours, the reliability of this claim has been disputed as well. Edward James (1988) stated: 'Whenever Gregory's dates for Clovis's reign can be checked by external sources, Gregory is wrong.'

Scholars Lanting & van der Plicht (2010) argued that Gregory of Tours' mention of Thoringia, in terminum Thoringorum and Thoringi in Book II Chapter 9 and 27 are misspellings that have been misinterpreted. Although many later readers associated this name with the eastern German realm of Thuringia (German: Thüringen), Gregory tells that the Franks 'came from Pannonia and all dwelt at first on the bank of the Rhine, and then crossing the Rhine they passed into Thoringia'. (Note: Tradunt enim multi, eosdem de Pannonia fuisse degressus, et primum quidem litora Rheni amnes incoluisse, dehinc, transacto Rheno, Thoringiam transmeasse, ibique iuxta pagus vel civitates regis crinitos super se creavisse de prima et, ut ita dicam, nobiliore suorum familia.) As both Pannonia and Thuringia lie to the east of the Rhine, crossing the Rhine made the Franks move to the west (towards modern Belgium, the Netherlands and France), away from Thuringia (in modern eastern Germany). More likely, Gregory actually meant the Civitas Tungrorum, the land of the Tungri (or Tungria, centred around modern Tongeren), which was located west of the Rhine, and in the direction of the Loire (which he explicitly situated south of Thoringia), Rhône and Somme rivers that he mentioned next, and the city of Cambrai that the Franks conquered next. As eastern German Thuringia wasn't annexed to the Frankish Empire until 531–4, Gregory couldn't have meant that region, but the Civitas Tungrorum is a very plausible alternative for 491–2.

== Bibliography ==
- Bachrach, Bernard S. Early Carolingian Warfare: Prelude to Empire, Philadelphia: Penn, 2001. ISBN 978-0-8122-2144-2
- Blunsom, E.O. The Past and Future of Law. Xlibris, 2013. ISBN 978-1-4628-7515-3
- Commire, Anne. Historic World Leaders (A-K), Gale, 1994. ISBN 978-0-8103-8408-8
- Cusack, Carole M. Conversion Among the Germanic Peoples, London: Cassell, 1998. ISBN 0304701556
- Forrest, Glen C., Anthony A. Evans and David Gibbons. The Illustrated Timeline of Military History, New York: Rosen, 2012. ISBN 978-1-4488-4794-5
- Middleton, John (ed). World Monarchies and Dynasties, London: Routledge, 2005. ISBN 0-7656-8050-5
- White, Lynn jr. Viator: Medieval and Renaissance Studies, Vol. 1. London: UCP, 1971. ISBN 0-520-01702-1
