= Aquitanian War =

Date	761–768
Location	Aquitaine
Result	Frankish victory

Belligerents
Francia	Duchy of Aquitaine

Commanders and leaders
Pepin the Short	Waiofar

The Aquitanian War was a series of campaigns by Pepin the Short to annex the Duchy of Aquitaine into the Frankish Kingdom. Following decades of strained relations between the Franks and the Aquitanians, the Aquitanians invaded Francia, culminating in an invasion force led by Pepin the Short in order to firmly subjugate the duchy.

== Prelude ==
By 700, Odo the Great had secured his control over the Duchy of Aquitaine. Early on, he ensured peace between him and the Franks. During his reign, he fought against the Umayyads, most notably at the Battle of Toulouse (721). His victory over the Moors saw him win admiration from Pope Gregory II, who honored him as a defender of Catholicism and honored his independence. Odo the Great ensured peace between Aquitaine and the Umayyads by marrying off his daughter Lampegia to the rebel Berber governor Uthman ibn Naissa. As a result of this marriage, Charles Martel turned his attention towards Aquitaine, crossing the Loire River in 731. Odo confronted his army and was swiftly defeated. In that same year, an Umayyad invasion force led by Abd al-Rahman al-Ghafiqi attacked and killed ibn Naissa, capturing Odo's daughter and placing her in a harem in Damascus. The following year, he turned his eyes North, raiding into Vasconia and ransacking Bordeaux. Odo attempted to stop this army, but he was defeated at the Battle of the River Garonne. Odo regrouped his forces and went to Charles Martel to warn him of this invasion force, and appeal for his help in fighting them off. Charles acquiesced, and on October 10th, 732, he and Odo defeated the Umayyads at the Battle of Tours. Odo the Great continued to rule until his death in 735.

Odo was succeeded by his son Hunald I. Early into his reign, Charles Martel launched an invasion into Aquitaine—swiftly occupying Bordeaux—in order to assert his authority over the duchy. Despite this success, he chose not to directly annex the Duchy of Aquitaine. Despite their promise to remain loyal, Hunald and his brother Hatto revolted in 736. However, Charles soon captured and imprisoned Hatto. After escaping prison, he was lured by his brother to a meeting at Poitiers, where he was blinded and imprisoned. Charles Martel died in 741, and in the following year, Hunald—in an alliance with the dukes of Bavaria and Alemannia—revolted against the Franks. In response, Carloman and Pepin invaded Aquitaine and sacked the city of Bourges and the fortress of Loches. However, after withdrawing from Aquitaine, Hunald sacked the city of Chartres, allegedly burning the Chartres Cathedral to the ground. Nevertheless, his revolt soon ended after the appointing of Childeric III as the King of the Franks. The brothers didn't forget his transgression, and in 745, they invaded Aquitaine. Hunald submitted to the Franks, and according to the Annals of Metz, he swore and oath to obey the Franks (omnem voluntatem), give them hostages, and send them any taxes owed. This humiliation was too much, and in that same year, he abdicated the throne—his son Waiofar succeeded him.
