= Pepin the Short =

King of the Franks from 751 to 768

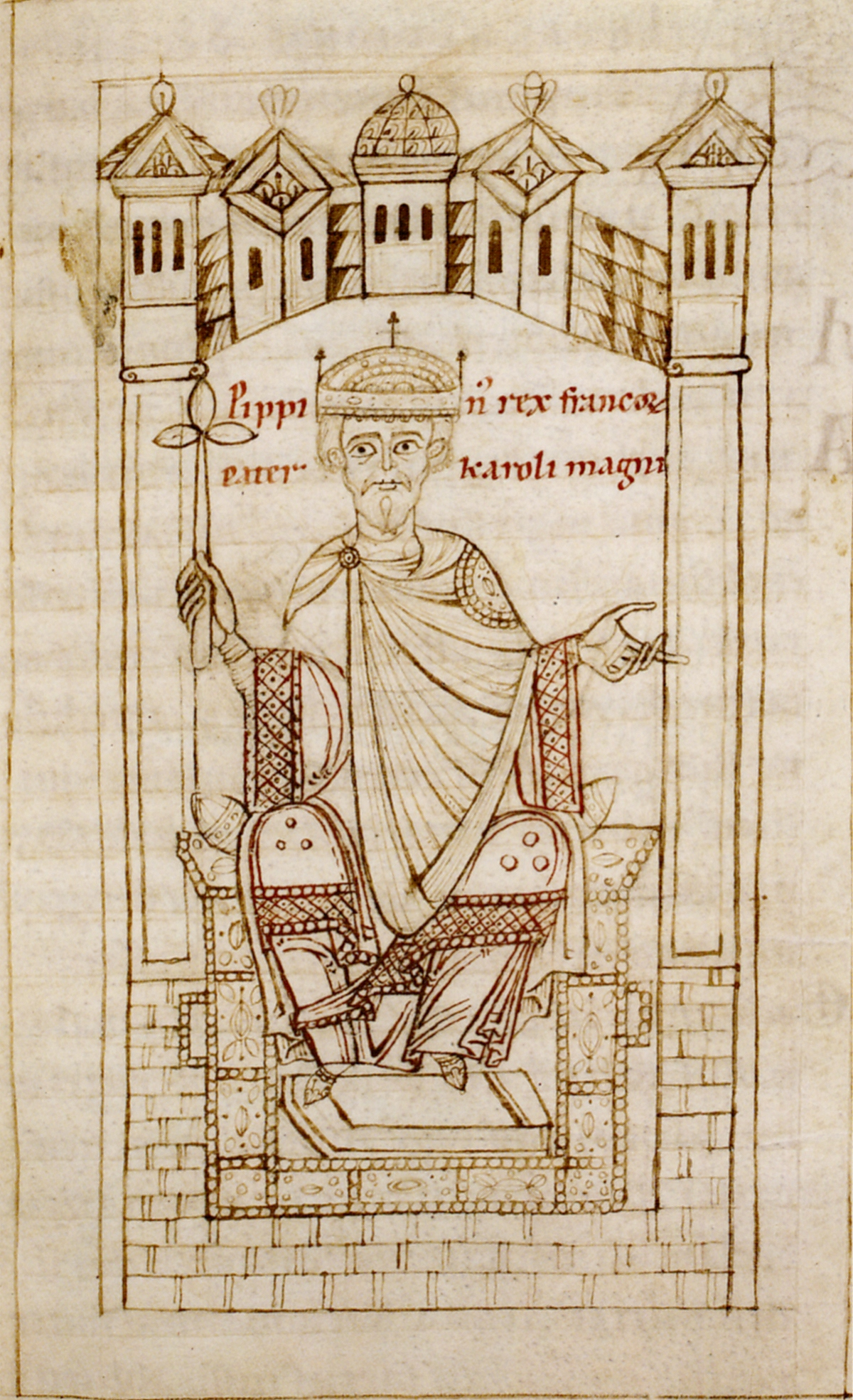
- Pepin the Younger, miniature, Anonymi chronica imperatorum, c. 1112–1114

King of the Franks
- Reign: 751 – 24 September 768
- Predecessor: Childeric III
- Successor: Charles I and Carloman I

Mayor of the Palace of Neustria
- Reign: 741–751
- Predecessor: Charles Martel
- Successor: Merged into crown

Mayor of the Palace of Austrasia
- Reign: 747–751
- Predecessor: Carloman
- Successor: Merged into crown
- Born: c. 714; Gaul (today France)
- Died: 24 September 768 (aged 53–54); Saint-Denis, Kingdom of the Franks
- Burial: Basilica of St Denis
- Spouse: Bertrada of Laon
- Issue: Charlemagne; Carloman I Gisela
- Dynasty: Carolingian
- Father: Charles Martel
- Mother: Rotrude of Hesbaye
- Religion: Chalcedonian Christianity

Pepin (Note: Pronounced /ˈpɛpɪn/; rarely, his name may be spelled Peppin or Pippin.) the Short (Latin: Pipinus; French: Pépin le Bref; German: Pippin der Kurze; (Note: Other bynames include der Kleine ('the little'), der Jüngere ('the younger'), and den Zwerg ('the dwarf').) c. 714 – 24 September 768) was King of the Franks from 751 until his death in 768. He was the first Carolingian to become king.

Pepin was the son of the Frankish prince Charles Martel and his wife Rotrude. Pepin's upbringing was distinguished by the ecclesiastical education he had received from the Christian monks of the Abbey Church of St. Denis, near Paris. In 741, after Pepin and his older brother Carloman besieged their half-brother Grifo (who did not accept their father's plans for succession) at Laon and imprisoned him in a monastery, he and Carloman succeeded their father as the Mayor of the Palace; In effect, Pepin reigned over Francia jointly with his elder brother, Carloman. Pepin ruled in Neustria, Burgundy, and Provence, while his older brother Carloman established himself in Austrasia, Alemannia, and Thuringia. The brothers were active in suppressing revolts led by the Bavarians, Aquitanians, Saxons, and the Alemanni in the early years of their reign. In 743, they ended the Frankish Interregnum by choosing Childeric III, who was to be the last Merovingian monarch, as figurehead King of the Franks.

Being well disposed towards the Christian Church and Papacy on account of their ecclesiastical upbringing, Pepin and Carloman continued their father's work in supporting Saint Boniface in reforming the Frankish church and evangelizing the Saxons. After Carloman, an intensely pious man, retired to religious life in 747, Pepin became the sole ruler of the Franks. He suppressed a revolt led by his escaped half-brother Grifo (who was being assisted by his maternal great-uncle Duke Odilo of Bavaria) and succeeded in becoming the undisputed master of all Francia. Giving up pretense, Pepin then forced Childeric into a monastery and had himself proclaimed King of the Franks with the support of Pope Zachary in 751. Not all members of the Carolingian family supported the decision, and Pepin had to put down a revolt led by Carloman's son, Drogo, and again by Grifo.

As King of the Franks, Pepin embarked on an ambitious program to expand his power. He reformed the Franks' legislation and continued Boniface's ecclesiastical reforms. Pepin also intervened in favour of the Papacy of Stephen II against the Lombards in Italy. In the midsummer of 754, Stephen II anointed Pepin afresh, together with his two sons, Charles and Carloman. The ceremony took place in the Abbey Church of St. Denis, and the Pope formally forbade the Franks ever to elect as king anyone who was not of the sacred race of Pepin. He also bestowed upon Pepin and his sons the title of Patrician of Rome. Pepin was able to secure several cities, which he then gave to the Pope as part of the Donation of Pepin. This formed the legal basis for the Papal States in the Middle Ages. The Byzantine Greeks, keen to make good relations with the growing power of the Frankish Empire, gave Pepin the title of Patricius.

In wars of expansion for the Frankish realm, Pepin conquered Septimania from the Umayyad and Andalusian Muslims and defeated them at the siege of Narbonne in 759, and proceeded to subjugate the southern realms by repeatedly defeating Waiofar and his Gascon troops, after which the Gascon and Aquitanian lords saw no option but to pledge loyalty to the Franks. Pepin was, however, troubled by the relentless revolts of the Saxons and the Bavarians. He campaigned tirelessly in Germania as well, but the final subjugation of the Germanic tribes was left to his successors.

Pepin died in 768 from unknown causes and was succeeded by his sons Charlemagne and Carloman. Although Pepin was one of the most powerful and successful rulers of his time, his reign is largely overshadowed by that of his more famous son, Charlemagne.

== Assumption of power ==
Pepin's father Charles Martel died in 741. He divided the rule of the Frankish kingdom between Pepin and his elder brother, Carloman, his surviving sons by his first wife: Carloman became Mayor of the Palace of Austrasia, Pepin became Mayor of the Palace of Neustria. Grifo, Charles's son by his second wife, Swanahild (also known as Swanhilde), demanded a share in the inheritance, but he was besieged in Laon, forced to surrender and imprisoned in a monastery by his two half-brothers.

In the Frankish realm, the kingdom's unity was essentially connected with the king's person. So Carloman, to secure this unity, raised the Merovingian Childeric to the throne (743). Then, in 747, Carloman resolved to enter a monastery after years of consideration. This left Francia in the hands of Pepin as sole mayor of the palace and dux et princeps Francorum.

At the time of Carloman's retirement, Grifo escaped his imprisonment and fled to Duke Odilo of Bavaria, who was married to Hiltrude, Pepin's sister. Pepin put down the renewed revolt led by his half-brother and successfully restored the kingdom's boundaries.

Under the reorganization of Francia by Charles Martel, the dux et princeps Francorum was the commander of the kingdom's armies, in addition to his administrative duties as mayor of the palace.

== First Carolingian king ==
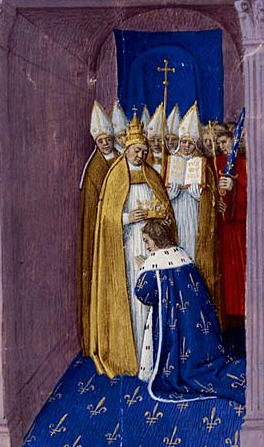
Coronation in 751 of Pepin by Boniface, Archbishop of Mainz

As mayor of the palace, Pepin was formally subject to the decisions of Childeric III, who had only the title of king, with no power. Since Pepin had control over the magnates and had the power of a king, he now addressed to Pope Zachary a suggestive question:

In regard to the kings of the Franks who no longer possess the royal power: is this state of things proper?

Hard pressed by the Lombards, Pope Zachary welcomed this move by the Franks to end an intolerable condition and lay the constitutional foundations for exercising royal power. The Pope replied that such a state of things is not proper. Under these circumstances, the wielder of actual power should be called King. After this decision, Childeric III was deposed and confined to a monastery. He was the last of the Merovingians.

Pepin was then elected King of the Franks by an assembly of Frankish nobles, with a large portion of his army on hand. The earliest account of his election and anointing is the Clausula de Pippino, written around 767. Meanwhile, Grifo continued his rebellion but was eventually killed in the battle of Saint-Jean-de-Maurienne in 753.

Pepin was assisted by his friend Vergilius of Salzburg, an Irish monk who probably used a copy of the "Collectio canonum Hibernensis" (an Irish collection of canon law) to advise him to receive royal unction to assist his recognition as king. Anointed a first time in 751 in Soissons, Pepin added to his power after Pope Stephen II traveled to Paris to anoint him a second time in a lavish ceremony at the Basilica of St Denis in 754, bestowing upon him the additional title of Patricius Romanorum (Patrician of the Romans). This was the first recorded crowning of a civil ruler by a Pope. As life expectancies were short in those days, and Pepin wanted family continuity, the Pope also anointed Pepin's sons, Charles (eventually known as Charlemagne), who was 12, and Carloman, who was 3.

The significance of the anointment ceremony is visible in that the Pope newly adopted it and was unheard of in Rome. This, together with granting the title of Patrician of the Romans, which was connected to the role of Defensor civitatis (protector of oppressed citizens), meant that Pepin was now designated as the defender of the Church.

== Expansion of the Frankish realm ==
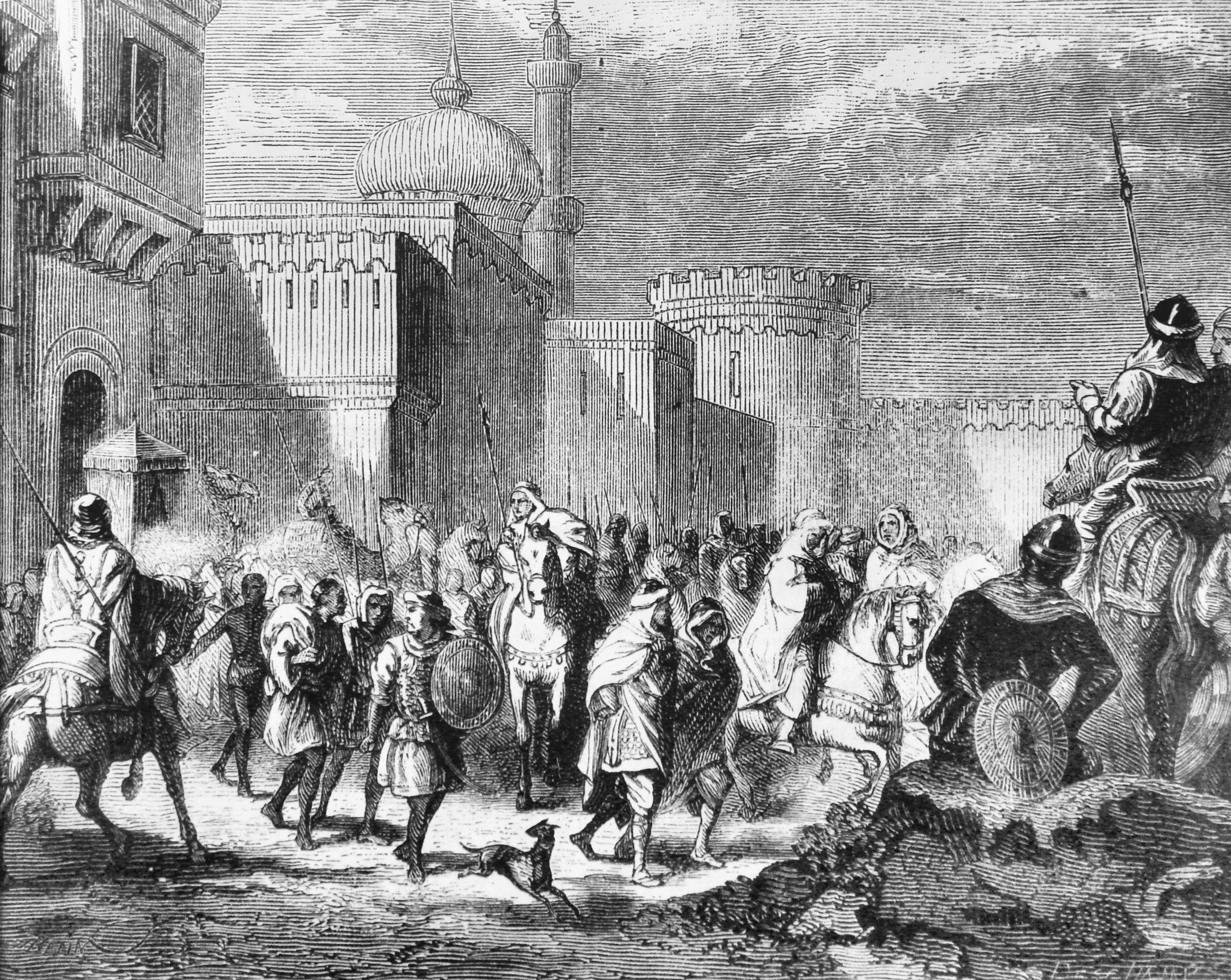
Arab and Berber Muslim troops retreating from Narbonne after the Frankish conquest of Septimania in 759. Illustration by Émile Bayard, 1880.

Pepin's expansion of the Frankish realm to Septimania and Aquitaine (760)

Pepin's first major act as King of the Franks was to go to war against the Lombard king Aistulf, who had expanded into the ducatus Romanus. After a meeting with Pope Stephen II at Ponthion, Pepin forced the Lombard king to return the property seized from the Church. He confirmed the papacy in possession of Ravenna and the Pentapolis, the so-called Donation of Pepin, whereby the Papal States were established, and the temporal reign of the papacy officially began. At about 752 he turned his attention to Septimania, a region in southern Gaul that formally belonged to the Visigothic Kingdom. The new king headed south in a military expedition down the Rhône Valley. He received the submission of eastern Septimania (i.e., Nîmes, Maguelone, Béziers, and Agde) after securing count Ansemund's allegiance. Then, the Frankish king went on to conquer the city of Narbonne, which had passed briefly to the Emirate of Córdoba, with the final victory by the Christian Franks in 759. Eventually, Pepin chased the Muslim Arabs and Berbers away from Septimania and conquered Narbonne in 759, after which the city became part of the Frankish Viscounty of Narbonne. Septimania became a march of the Carolingian Empire and then West Francia down to the 13th century, though it was culturally and politically autonomous from the northern France-based central royal government. By the end of the 9th century, the region was renamed as Gothia or Marca Gothica ("Gothic March"). The region was under the influence of the people from the count territories of Toulouse, Provence, and ancient County of Barcelona. It was part of the wider cultural and linguistic region comprising the southern third of France known as Occitania.

However, Aquitaine remained under Waiofar's Gascon-Aquitanian rule and beyond Frankish reach. Duke Waiofar appears to have confiscated Church lands, maybe distributing them among his troops. In 760, after conquering the Roussillon from the defeated Muslims and denouncing Waiofar's actions, Pepin moved his troops over to Toulouse and Albi, ravaged with fire and sword most of Aquitaine, and, in retaliation, counts loyal to Waiofar ravaged Burgundy. Pepin, in turn, besieged the Aquitanian-held towns and strongholds of Bourbon, Clermont, Chantelle, Bourges and Thouars, defended by Waiofar's Gascon troops, who were overcome, captured and deported into northern France with their children and wives.

In 763, Pepin advanced further into the heart of Waiofar's domains and captured major strongholds (Poitiers, Limoges, Angoulême, etc.), after which Waiofar counterattacked and war became bitter. Pepin opted to spread terror, burning villas, destroying vineyards, and depopulating monasteries. By 765, the brutal tactics seemed to pay off for the Franks, who destroyed resistance in central Aquitaine and devastated the whole region. The city of Toulouse was conquered by Pepin in 767, as was Waiofar's capital of Bordeaux. As a result, Aquitanian nobles and Gascons from beyond the Garonne also saw no option but to accept a pro-Frankish peace treaty (Fronsac, c. 768). Waiofar escaped but was assassinated by his frustrated followers in 768.

== Legacy ==
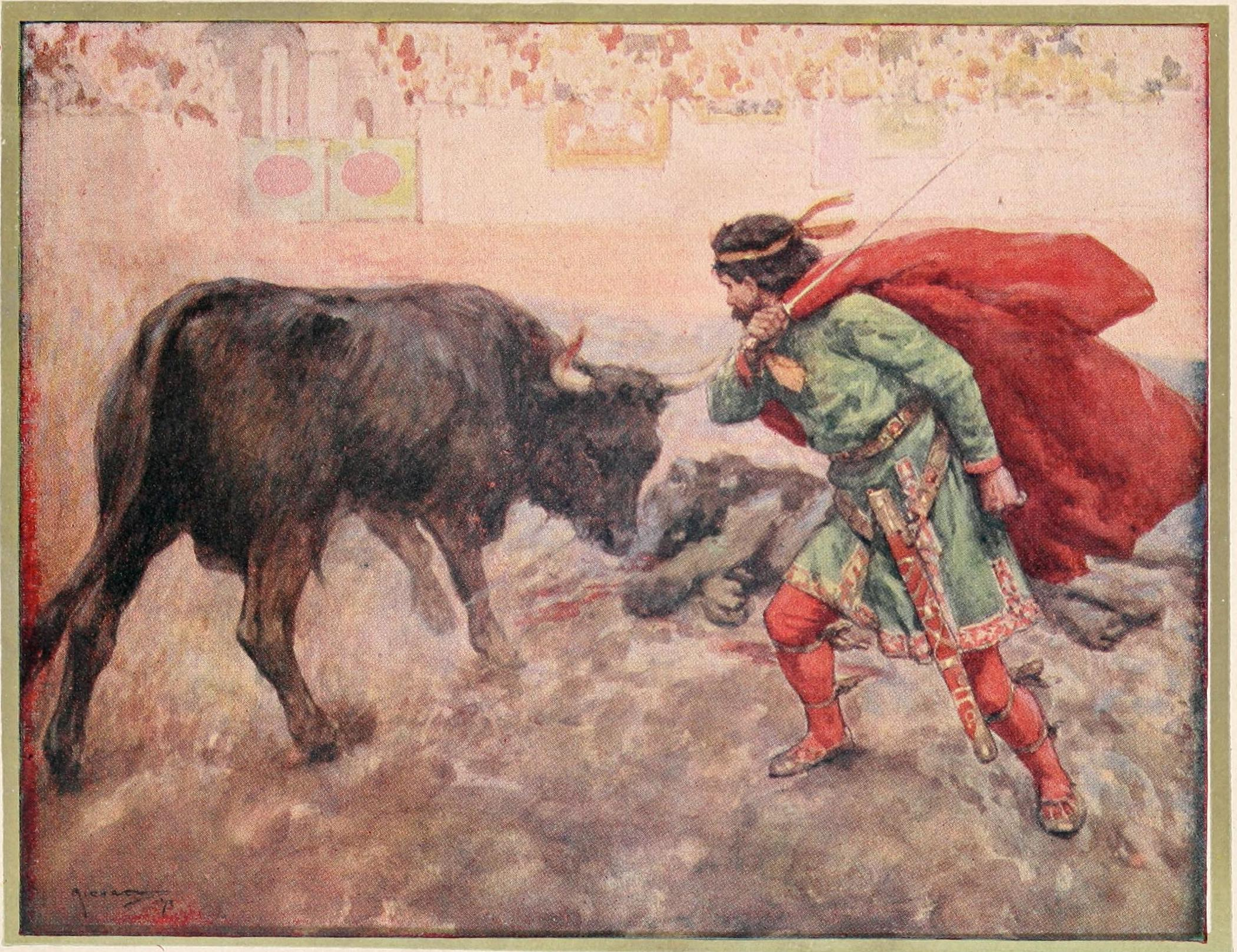
Allegoric depiction of Pepin

Pepin died on campaign in 768 at the age of 54. He was interred in the Basilica of Saint Denis in modern-day Metropolitan Paris. His wife Bertrada was also interred there in 783. Charlemagne rebuilt the Basilica in honor of his parents and placed markers at the entrance.

The Frankish realm was divided according to the Salic law between his two sons: Charlemagne and Carloman I.

== Family ==
Pepin married Leutberga from the Danube region. They had five children. She was repudiated sometime after the birth of Charlemagne, and her children were sent to convents.

In 744, Pepin married Bertrada, daughter of Caribert of Laon. They are known to have had seven children, at least three of whom survived to adulthood:

- Charles (Charlemagne) (2 April 747 – 28 January 814)
- Carloman (751 – 4 December 771)
- Pepin (756–762)
- Gisela (757–810)
- Bertha, died young
- Adelheid, died young, buried in Metz
- Rothaid, died young, buried in Metz

Charles commissioned Paul the Deacon to compose poetic epitaphs for his sister Rothaid and Adelheid, Hic ego qui iaceo and Perpetualis amor, respectively.

== See also ==
- List of Frankish kings

== Bibliography ==
- Brown, T.S. (1995). "Byzantine Italy". In McKitterick, Rosamond (ed.). The New Cambridge Medieval History, c. 700–c. 900. Vol. II. Cambridge University Press.
- Davis, R. H. C. (1957). A History of Medieval Europe – From Constantine to Saint Louis. Great Britain: Longman. ISBN 0582482089.
- Doig, Allan (2008). Liturgy and architecture from the early church to the Middle Ages. Ashgate. ISBN 978-0754652748.
- Duckett, Eleanor Shipley (20 September 2022). "Pippin III". www.britannica.com. Encyclopedia Britannica.
- Dutton, Paul Edward (2008). Charlemagne's Mustache: And Other Cultural Clusters of a Dark Age. Palgrave Macmillan.
- Enright, M.J. (1985). Iona, Tara, and Soissons: The Origin of the Royal Anointing Ritual. Walter de Gruyter.
- Kazhdan, Alexander P. (Aleksandr Petrovich); Talbot, Alice-Mary Maffry; Cutler, Anthony; Gregory, Timothy E.; Ševčenko, Nancy Patterson (1991). The Oxford dictionary of Byzantium. New York: Oxford University Press. ISBN 0195046528. OCLC 22733550.
- Lewis, Archibald R. (2010). The Development of Southern French and Catalan Society, 718–1050. The Library of Iberian Resources Online.
- Petersen, Leif Inge Ree (2013). Siege Warfare and Military Organization in the Successor States (400–800 AD): Byzantium, the West and Islam. Leiden: Brill Publishers. ISBN 978-90-04-25199-1.
- Riché, Pierre (1993). The Carolingians: A Family Who Forged Europe. Translated by Allen, Michael Idomir. University of Pennsylvania Press.
- Ross, Sidney David (2020). Establishing the Authentic Corpus of the Latin Verse of Paul the Deacon: A Philological, Textual and Statistical Study (PhD diss.). University of York.
- Schulman, Jana K., ed. (2002). The Rise of the Medieval World, 500–1300: A Biographical Dictionary. Greenwood Press.
- Tucker, Spencer C., ed. (2011). A Global Chronology of Conflict. Vol. I. ABC-CLIO.
- Ullmann, Walter (2013). Growth of Papal Government in Middle Ages – Study in Ideological Relation of Clerical to Lay Power. Routledge.

Pepin the Short Carolingian Dynasty Born: 714 Died: 768
Preceded by Charles Martel	Mayor of the Palace of Neustria; 741–751	Merged into crown
Preceded by Carloman	Mayor of the Palace of Austrasia; 747–751	Merged into crown
Preceded by Childeric III	King of the Franks; 751 – 24 September 768	Succeeded by Charlemagne and Carloman I
