= Bernard Bachrach =

American historian (1939–2023)

Bernard Stanley Bachrach (May 14, 1939 – July 14, 2023) was an American medieval historian. He taught history at the University of Minnesota from 1967 until his retirement in 2020. He specialized in the Early Middle Ages, mainly on the topics of medieval warfare, medieval Jewry, and early Angevin history (he wrote a biography of Fulk Nerra). He also wrote an important article about the treatment of Jews in the Visigothic kingdom.

Bachrach was born on May 14, 1939. He received the CEE Distinguished Teaching Award from the University of Minnesota in 1993 and entered the College of Liberal Arts Scholars of the college at Minnesota in 2000. He was also the recipient of a McKnight Research Award. He has translated the Liber historiae Francorum from Latin into English.

Bernard Bachrach died on July 14, 2023, at the age of 84.

== Works ==
- Merovingian Military Organization, 481-751, University of Minnesota Press, 1972. ISBN 0-8166-0621-8
- Early Carolingian Warfare: Prelude to Empire, University of Pennsylvania Press, 2001. ISBN 0-8122-3533-9
- The Anatomy of a Little War, a diplomatic and military history of the Gundovald affair (568-586), Westview Press, 1994. ISBN 0-8133-1492-5
- A History of the Alans in the West: From Their First Appearance in the Sources of Classical Antiquity Through the Early Middle Ages, University of Minnesota Press, 1973. ISBN 0-8166-0678-1
- Armies and Politics in the Early Medieval West, Variorum, 1993. ISBN 0-86078-374-X
- Fulk Nerra, the Neo-Roman Consul 987-1040: A Political Biography of the Angevin Count, University of California Press, 1993. ISBN 0-520-07996-5
- State-building in Medieval France: Studies in Early Angevin History. Aldershot: Variorum. 1995.
- Warfare and Military Organization in Pre-Crusade Europe, Ashgate Publishing, 2002. ISBN 0-86078-870-9
- The Medieval Church: Success or Failure?, Holt, Rinehart & Winston, 1971. ISBN 0-03-085185-8
- Early Medieval Jewish Policy in Western Europe, University of Minnesota Press, 1977. ISBN 0-8166-0814-8
- Jews in Barbarian Europe, Coronado Press, 1977. ISBN 0-87291-088-1
- The Saxon War, Catholic University of America Press by Bruno of Merseburg (Bruno the Saxon, translated by Bernard S. Bachrach and David S. Bachrach, 2022.
- Deeds of the Saxons, Catholic University of America Press by Widukind of Corvey, translated by Bernard S. Bachrach and David S. Bachrach, 2014.
