= List of battles involving the Kingdom of France =

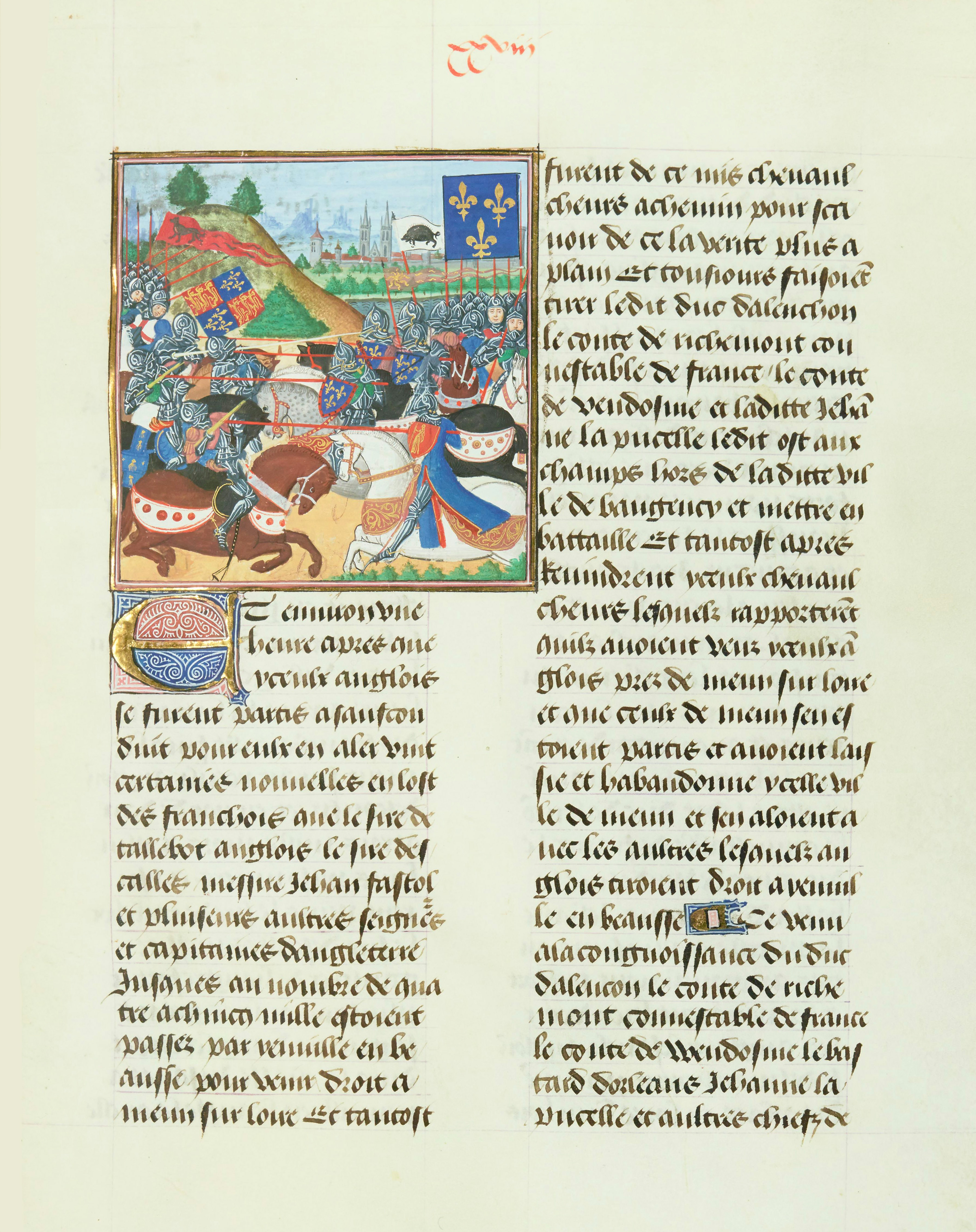
The battle of Patay (1429), during the Hundred Years' War.

This is a chronological list of battles involving the Kingdom of France (987–1792).

- For pre-987 battles, see List of battles involving the Franks and Francia.
- For post-1792 battles, see List of battles involving France in modern history.
- For entire wars during 987–1792, see list of wars involving the Kingdom of France.

These lists do not include the battles of the French civil wars (as the Wars of Religion, the Fronde, the War in the Vendée) unless a foreign country is involved.

The list gives the name, the date, the present-day location of the battles, the French allies and enemies, and the result of these conflicts following this legend:

French military victory
French military defeat
Indecisive or unclear outcome

== House of Capet (987–1328) ==
Battle	Date	Current location	Contemporary location	Allies	Enemies	Issue
Norman conquest of England (1066)
Battle of Bremule	20 August 1119	France	Duchy of Normandy	Rebellious Norman barons	Duchy of Normandy Kingdom of England	Defeat
First Crusade (1095–1099)
Siege of Nicaea	14 May – 19 June 1097	Turkey	Sultanate of Rum	Crusaders; Byzantine Empire	Sultanate of Rum	Victory
Battle of Dorylaeum	1 July 1097	Turkey	Sultanate of Rum	Crusaders	Sultanate of Rum	Victory
Siege of Antioch	21 October 1097 – 2 June 1098	Turkey	Sultanate of Rum	Crusaders	Sultanate of Rum	Victory
Siege of Jerusalem	7 June – 15 July 1099	Israel	Fatimid Caliphate	Crusaders	Fatimid Caliphate	Victory
Battle of Ascalon	12 August 1099	Israel	Fatimid Caliphate	Crusaders	Fatimid Caliphate	Victory
Second Crusade (1145–1149)
Battle of Ephesus	24 December 1147	Turkey	Sultanate of Rum	None	Sultanate of Rum	Victory
Battle of the Meander	December 1147	Turkey	Sultanate of Rum	None	Sultanate of Rum	Victory
Battle of Mount Cadmus	6 January 1148	Turkey	Sultanate of Rum	None	Sultanate of Rum	Defeat
Siege of Damascus	23–28 July 1148	Syria	Fatimid Caliphate	Crusaders	Fatimid Caliphate	Defeat
Third Crusade (1189–1192)
Siege of Acre	August 1189 – July 1191	Israel	Ayyubid Sultanate	Crusaders	Ayyubid Sultanate	Victory
Battle of Arsuf	7 September 1191	Israel	Ayyubid Sultanate	Crusaders	Ayyubid Sultanate	Victory
Fourth Crusade (1202–1204)
Siege of Zara	10–23 November 1202	Croatia	Kingdom of Croatia	Crusaders; Republic of Venice	Kingdom of Hungary; Kingdom of Croatia	Victory
First Siege of Constantinople	1203	Turkey	Byzantine Empire	Crusaders; Republic of Venice	Byzantine Empire	Victory
Second Siege of Constantinople	1204	Turkey	Byzantine Empire	Crusaders; Republic of Venice	Byzantine Empire	Victory
Anglo-French War (1202–1214)
Siege of Château Gaillard	August 1203 – 8 March 1204	France	Angevin Empire	None	Duchy of Normandy Kingdom of England	Victory
Battle of Damme	30–31 May 1213	Belgium	Kingdom of France	None	Kingdom of England	Defeat
Siege of Roche-au-Moine	2 July 1214	France	Angevin Empire	None	Kingdom of England	Victory
Battle of Bouvines	27 July 1214	France	Kingdom of France	None	Welfs Flanders Kingdom of England Boulogne	Victory
Albigensian Crusade (1209–1229)
Sack of Béziers	22 July 1209	France	County of Toulouse	Crusaders	Cathars Viscounty of Carcassonne	Victory
Siege of Carcassonne	August 1 - 15 1209	France	County of Toulouse	Crusaders	Cathars Viscounty of Carcassonne	Victory
Siege of Minerve	Early June – 22 July 1210	France	County of Toulouse	Crusaders	Cathars Viscounty of Carcassonne	Victory
Siege of Termes	Early August – 22 November 1210	France	County of Toulouse	Crusaders	Cathars Viscounty of Carcassonne	Victory
Battle of Muret	12 September 1213	France	County of Toulouse	Crusaders	Crown of Aragon County of Toulouse County of Comminges County of Foix Viscounty of Carcassonne	Victory
Siege of Toulouse	22 September 1217 – 25 July 1218	France	County of Toulouse	Crusaders	County of Toulouse County of Comminges County of Foix Viscounty of Carcassonne	Victory
Siege of Montségur	May 1243 – March 1244	France	County of Toulouse	None	Cathars	Victory
First Barons' War (1215–1217)
Battle of Lincoln	20 May 1217	England	Kingdom of England	None	Kingdom of England	Defeat
Battle of Sandwich	24 August 1217	England	Kingdom of England	None	Kingdom of England	Defeat
Saintonge War (1242)
Battle of Taillebourg	21 July 1242	France	Duchy of Aquitaine	Pro-Capetian Poitou	Kingdom of England Pro-Plantagenet Poitou	Victory
Seventh Crusade (1248–1254)
Siege of Damietta	6 June 1249	Egypt	Ayyubid Sultanate	None	Ayyubid Sultanate	Victory
Battle of Al Mansurah	8–11 February 1250	Egypt	Ayyubid Sultanate	None	Ayyubid Sultanate	Defeat
Battle of Fariskur	6 April 1250	Egypt	Ayyubid Sultanate	None	Ayyubid Sultanate	Defeat
Eighth Crusade (1270)
Siege of Tunis	18 July 1270 – 10 November	Tunisia	Hafsid Kingdom	None	Hafsid Kingdom	Indecisive
Aragonese Crusade (1284–1285)
Battle of Les Formigues	4 September 1285	Spain	Crown of Aragon	Genoa	Crown of Aragon	Defeat
Battle of the Col de Panissars	1 October 1285	(France) / (Spain) Pyrenees	Crown of Aragon	None	Crown of Aragon	Defeat
Franco-Flemish War (1297–1305)
Battle of Furnes	20 August 1297	Belgium	Kingdom of France	None	County of Flanders	Victory
Siege of Lille	29 August	France	Kingdom of France	None	County of Flanders	Victory
Bruges Matins	18 May 1302	Belgium	Kingdom of France	None	County of Flanders	Defeat
Battle of the Golden Spurs	11 July 1302	Belgium	Kingdom of France	None	County of Flanders	Defeat
Battle of Arques	4 April 1303	France	Kingdom of France	None	County of Flanders	Defeat
Battle of Zierikzee	10–11 August 1304	Netherlands	County of Holland	County of Holland	County of Flanders	Victory
Battle of Mons-en-Pévèle	18 August 1304	France	Kingdom of France	None	County of Flanders	Victory
War of Saint-Sardos (1324)
War of Saint-Sardos	1324	France	Duchy of Aquitaine	None	Kingdom of England	Victory
Peasant revolt in Flanders (1323–1328)
Battle of Cassel	23 August 1328	France	Kingdom of France	None	Flemings	Victory

== House of Valois (1328–1589) ==
=== Hundred Years' War and aftermath ===
Battle	Date	Current location	Contemporary location	Allies	Enemies	Issue
Hundred Years' War (1337–1453)
English Channel naval campaign	March 1338 – October 1339	English Channel	Idem	Genoese mercenaries Castilian mercenaries	Kingdom of England County of Flanders	Indecisive
Invasions of the Channel Islands	March 1338 – 1468	Channel Islands	Idem	Genoese mercenaries	Kingdom of England	Indecisive
Battle of Arnemuiden	23 September 1338	Netherlands	Kingdom of France	None	Kingdom of England	Victory
Siege of Cambrai (1339)	September – 8 October 1339	France	Holy Roman Empire	None	Kingdom of England	Victory
Battle of Sluys	24 June 1340	Netherlands	Kingdom of France	Genoese mercenaries	Kingdom of England	Defeat
Battle of Saint-Omer	26 July 1340	France	Kingdom of France	None	Kingdom of England County of Flanders	Victory
Siege of Tournai	21 July – 25 September 1340	Belgium	Kingdom of France	None	Kingdom of England County of Flanders Duchy of Brabant Duchy of Guelders County of Looz	Victory
Battle of Champtoceaux	14–15 October 1341	France	Kingdom of France	House of Blois	House of Montfort	Victory
Siege of Brest	18 August 1342	France	Kingdom of France	House of Blois	Kingdom of England House of Montfort	Defeat
Battle of Morlaix	30 September 1342	France	Kingdom of France	None	Kingdom of England	Defeat
Battle of Bergerac	August 1345	France	Kingdom of France	None	Kingdom of England; Gascony	Defeat
Battle of Auberoche	21 October 1345	France	Kingdom of France	None	Kingdom of England	Defeat
Lancaster's chevauchée of 1346	1346	France	Kingdom of France	None	Kingdom of England	Defeat
Battle of Saint-Pol-de-Léon	9 June 1346	France	Kingdom of France	House of Blois	Kingdom of England House of Montfort	Defeat
Battle of Caen	26 July 1346	France	Kingdom of France	None	Kingdom of England	Defeat
Siege of Aiguillon	1 April – 20 August 1346	France	Kingdom of France	None	Kingdom of England	Defeat
Battle of Blanchetaque	22 August 1346	France	Kingdom of France	None	Kingdom of England	Defeat
Battle of Crécy	26 August 1346	France	Kingdom of France	Genoese Mercenaries Kingdom of Navarre Kingdom of Bohemia Kingdom of Majorca	Kingdom of England German knights Denmark	Defeat
Siege of Calais	4 September 1346 – 3 August 1347	France	Kingdom of France	None	Kingdom of England County of Flanders	Defeat
Battle of La Roche-Derrien	18 June 1347	France	Kingdom of France	House of Blois	Kingdom of England House of Montfort	Defeat
Battle of Crotoy	25 June 1347	France	Kingdom of France	None	Kingdom of England	Defeat
Battle of Lunalonge	May or June 1349	France	Kingdom of France	None	Kingdom of England Gascony	Defeat
Battle of Calais	1 January 1350	France	Kingdom of France	None	Kingdom of England	Defeat
Combat of the Thirty	26 March 1351	France	Kingdom of France	House of Blois	Kingdom of England House of Montfort	Victory
Battle of Saintes	1 April 1351	France	Kingdom of France	None	Kingdom of England	Defeat
Battle of Ardres	6 June 1351	France	Kingdom of France	None	Kingdom of England	Victory
Siege of Saint-Jean-d'Angély (1351)	February–August 1351	France	Kingdom of France	None	Kingdom of England	Victory
Battle of Mauron	14 August 1352	France	Kingdom of France	House of Blois	Kingdom of England House of Montfort	Defeat
Battle of Montmuran	10 April 1354	France	Kingdom of France	House of Blois	Kingdom of England House of Montfort	Victory
Siege of Rennes	3 October 1356 – 5 July 1357	France	Kingdom of France	None	Kingdom of England	Victory
Battle of Poitiers	19 September 1356	France	Kingdom of France	None	Kingdom of England Gascony	Defeat
Battle of Nogent-sur-Seine	13 June 1359	France	Kingdom of France	None	Kingdom of England	Victory
Battle of Brignais	6 April 1362	France	Kingdom of France	None	Routiers	Defeat
Battle of Cocherel	16 May 1364	Navarre Kingdom of England	Victory	None		
Battle of Auray	29 September 1364	House of Blois	House of Montfort Kingdom of England	Defeat		
Battle of Arinez	1367	Spain	Kingdom of Castile	Crown of Castile	Crown of Castile Duchy of Gascony Kingdom of England Duchy of Aquitaine Kingdom of Mallorca	Victory
Battle of Nájera	3 April 1367	Spain	Kingdom of Castile	Crown of Castile	Crown of Castile Duchy of Gascony Kingdom of England Duchy of Aquitaine Kingdom of Mallorca	Defeat
Battle of Montiel	14 March 1369	Spain	Kingdom of Castile	Crown of Castile	Crown of Castile Kingdom of Portugal	Victory
Battle of the Bridge of Lussac	December 1369	France	Kingdom of France	None	Kingdom of England	Victory
Siege of Limoges	September 1370	France	Kingdom of France	None	Kingdom of England	Defeat
Battle of Pontvallain	4 December 1370	France	Kingdom of France	None	Kingdom of England	Victory
Siege of Soubise	22-23 August 1372	France	Kingdom of France	None	Kingdom of England	Victory
Battle of La Rochelle	22 June 1372	France	Kingdom of France	Crown of Castile	Kingdom of England	Victory
Siege of Guernsey	June 1372	England	Kingdom of England	None	Kingdom of England	Victory
Battle of Chiset	1373	France	Kingdom of France	None	Kingdom of England	Victory
Siege of Gorey Castle	1373	Jersey	Jersey	None	Kingdom of England	Indecisive
Sack of Rye	1377	England	Kingdom of England	None	Kingdom of England	Victory
Battle of Lewes	July 1377	England	Kingdom of England	None	Kingdom of England	Victory
Battle of the Isle of Wight	1377	England	Kingdom of England	None	Kingdom of England	Victory
Battle of Yarmouth	1377	England	Kingdom of England	None	Kingdom of England	Victory
Battle of Eymet	1377	France	Kingdom of France	None	Kingdom of England	Victory
Siege of Gravesend	Summer 1380	England	Kingdom of France	None	Kingdom of England	Victory
Siege of Nantes	November 1380	France	Kingdom of France	None	Kingdom of England	Victory
Battle of chateau de Randon	1381	France	Kingdom of France	None	Kingdom of England	Victory
Battle of Roosebeke	27 November 1382	Belgium	Kingdom of France	None	Flemings	Victory
Battle of Aljubarrota	14 August 1385	Portugal	Kingdom of Portugal	Crown of Castile; Crown of Aragon	Kingdom of Portugal; Kingdom of England	Defeat
Battle of Brest	1404	France	Kingdom of France	None	Kingdom of England	Victory
Sack of Dartmouth	1404	England	Kingdom of England	None	Kingdom of England	Victory
Battle of Falmouth	November 1404	England	Kingdom of England	None	Kingdom of England	Victory
Battle of L'Ecluse	22 May 1405	France	Kingdom of France	None	Kingdom of England	Victory
Battle of Haverfordwest	1405	England	Kingdom of England	None	Kingdom of England	Victory
Battle of Carmathe	1405	England	Kingdom of England	None	Kingdom of England	Victory
Battle of Worchester	1405	England	Kingdom of England	None	Kingdom of England	Victory
Battle of Jersey	1405	Jersey	Jersey	None	Kingdom of England	Victory
Battle of Soubise	1413	France	Kingdom of France	None	Kingdom of England	Victory
Siege of Harfleur	18 August – 22 September 1415	France	Kingdom of France	None	Kingdom of England	Defeat
Battle of Agincourt	25 October 1415	France	Kingdom of France	None	Kingdom of England	Defeat
Battle of Valmont	9–11 March 1416	France	Kingdom of France	None	Kingdom of England	Indecisive
Siege of Caen (1417)	14 August – 20 September 1417	France	Kingdom of France	None	Kingdom of England	Defeat
Siege of Rouen	29 July 1418 – 19 January 1419	France	Kingdom of France	None	Kingdom of England	Defeat
Battle of Baugé	21 March 1421	France	Kingdom of France	Kingdom of Scotland	Kingdom of England	Victory
Siege of Meaux	6 October 1421 – 10 May 1422	France	Kingdom of France	None	Kingdom of England	Defeat
Battle of Cravant	31 July 1423	France	Kingdom of France	Kingdom of Scotland Duchy of Brittany	Kingdom of England Duchy of Burgundy	Defeat
Battle of La Brossinière	26 September 1423	France	Kingdom of France	Angevins Maine Duchy of Brittany	Kingdom of England	Victory
Battle of Verneuil	17 August 1424	France	Kingdom of France	Kingdom of Scotland	Kingdom of England Duchy of Burgundy	Defeat
Battle of St. James	6 March 1426	France	Kingdom of France	Duchy of Brittany	Kingdom of England	Defeat
Siege of Montargis	15 July – 5 September 1427	France	Kingdom of France	None	Kingdom of England	Victory
Battle of the Herrings	5 February 1429	France	Kingdom of France	Kingdom of Scotland	Kingdom of England	Defeat
Siege of Orléans	12 October 1428 – 9 May 1429	France	Kingdom of France	Kingdom of Scotland	Kingdom of England	Victory
Battle of Jargeau	10–12 June 1429	France	Kingdom of France	None	Kingdom of England	Victory
Battle of Meung-sur-Loire	15 June 1429	France	Kingdom of France	None	Kingdom of England	Victory
Battle of Beaugency	15–16 June 1429	France	Kingdom of France	None	Kingdom of England	Victory
Battle of Patay	18 June 1429	France	Kingdom of France	None	Kingdom of England	Victory
March to Reims	29 June – 16 July 1429	France	Kingdom of France	None	Kingdom of England	Victory
Siege of Paris (1429)	3–8 September 1429	France	Kingdom of France	None	Kingdom of England Duchy of Burgundy	Defeat
Siege of Saint-Pierre-le-Moûtier	October – 4 November 1429	France	Kingdom of France	None	Duchy of Burgundy	Victory
Siege of La Charité	24 November – 25 December 1429	France	Kingdom of France	None	Duchy of Burgundy	Defeat
Siege of Compiègne	May–November 1430	France	Kingdom of France	None	Duchy of Burgundy Kingdom of England	Victory
Siege of Langy-sur-Marne	May–August 1432	France	Kingdom of France	None	Kingdom of England	Victory
Battle of Gerberoy	9 May 1435	France	Kingdom of France	None	Kingdom of England	Victory
Siege of Meulan	24 September 1435	France	Kingdom of France	None	Kingdom of England	Victory
Siege of Saint-Denis	Late August – 4 October 1435	France	Kingdom of France	None	Kingdom of England Duchy of Burgundy	Defeat
Siege of Creil	8–25 May 1441	France	Kingdom of France	None	Kingdom of England	Victory
Capture of Évreux	15 September 1441	France	Kingdom of France	None	Kingdom of England	Victory
Siege of Pontoise	6 June – 19 September 1441	France	Kingdom of France	None	Kingdom of England	Victory
Siege of Tartas	31 August 1440 – 24 June 1442	France	Kingdom of France	None	Kingdom of England	Victory
Siege of Dieppe	2 November 1442 – 14 August 1443	France	Kingdom of France	None	Kingdom of England	Victory
Siege of Verneuil	19 July – 25 August 1449	France	Kingdom of France	None	Kingdom of England	Victory
Siege of Rouen	October 1449	France	Kingdom of France	None	Kingdom of England	Victory
Siege of Valognes	March 1450	France	Kingdom of France	None	Kingdom of England	Defeat
Battle of Formigny	15 April 1450	France	Kingdom of France	Duchy of Brittany	Kingdom of England	Victory
Siege of Caen	5 June – July 1450	France	Kingdom of France	Duchy of Brittany	Kingdom of England	Victory
Siege of Falaise (1450)	6–21 July 1450	France	Kingdom of France	None	Kingdom of England	Victory
Siege of Domfront (1450)	23 July–2 August 1450	France	Kingdom of France	None	Kingdom of England	Victory
Siege of Cherbourg (1450)	6 July–12 August 1450	France	Kingdom of France	None	Kingdom of England	Victory
Battle of Blanquefort	1 November 1450	France	Kingdom of France	None	Kingdom of England	Victory
Battle of Castillon	17 July 1453	France	Duchy of Aquitaine	Duchy of Brittany	Kingdom of England	Victory
Wars of the Roses (1453–1487)
Battle of Bosworth Field	August 1485	England	Kingdom of England	House of Tudor Stanley Family	House of York	Victory
Barbary Crusade (1390)
Siege of Mahdia	1 July – October 1390	Tunisia	Hafsid Kingdom	Republic of Genoa	Hafsid Kingdom Kingdom of Tlemcen Béjaïa	Indecisive
Crusade of Nicopolis (1396)
Battle of Nicopolis	25 September 1396	Bulgaria	Bulgarian Empire	Holy Roman Empire; Kingdom of Hungary; Wallachia (Sovereign Military Order of Malta) Knights Hospitaller; Republic of Venice; Republic of Genoa; Second Bulgarian Empire	Ottoman Empire; Moravian Serbia	Defeat
Old Zürich War (1440–1446)
Battle of St. Jakob an der Birs	26 August 1444	Switzerland	Republic of the Swiss	None	Republic of the Swiss Basel	Victory
League of the Public Weal (1465)
Battle of Montlhéry	July 1465	France	Kingdom of France	None	Duchy of Burgundy	Victory
Siege of Beauvais	1472	France	Kingdom of France	None	Duchy of Burgundy	Victory
War of the Burgundian Succession (1477–1482)
Battle of Guinegate	7 August 1479	France	Duchy of Burgundy	None	Duchy of Burgundy	Defeat
Mad War (1485–1488)
Siege of Châteaubriant	15–23 April 1488	France	Duchy of Brittany	None	Duchy of Brittany	Victory
Siege of Fougères	12–19 July 1488	France	Duchy of Brittany	None	Duchy of Brittany	Victory
Battle of Saint-Aubin-du-Cormier	28 July 1488	France	Duchy of Brittany	None	Duchy of Brittany	Victory

=== Charles VIII (1483–1498) ===
Battle	Date	Current location	Contemporary location	Allies	Enemies	Result
Italian War of 1494–1498
Battle of Rapallo	5 September 1494	Italy	Republic of Genoa	None	Spain, Kingdom of Naples	Victory
Battle of Seminara	28 June 1495	Italy	Kingdom of Naples	None	Spain, Kingdom of Naples	Victory
Battle of Fornovo	6 July 1495	Italy	Duchy of Milan	None	Republic of Venice Duchy of Milan Duchy of Mantua	indecisive result

=== Louis XII (1498–1515) ===
Battle	Date	Current location	Contemporary location	Allies	Enemies	Result
Italian War of 1499–1504
Battle of Novara	April 1500	Italy	Duchy of Milan	None	Duchy of Milan	Victory
Siege of Capua	24 June 1501	Italy	Kingdom of Naples	None	Spanish Empire, Kingdom of Naples	Victory
Battle of Ruvo	23 February 1503	Italy	Kingdom of Naples	None	Spanish Empire	Defeat
Battle of Seminara	21 April 1503	Italy	Kingdom of Naples	None	Spanish Empire	Defeat
Battle of Cerignola	28 April 1503	Italy	Kingdom of Naples	None	Spanish Empire	Defeat
Battle of Garigliano	29 December 1503	Italy	Kingdom of Naples	None	Spanish Empire	Defeat
War of the League of Cambrai (1508–1516)
Battle of Agnadello	14 May 1509	Italy	Duchy of Milan	None	Republic of Venice	Victory
Siege of Padua	15–30 September 1509	Italy	Republic of Venice	Holy Roman Empire Papal States	Republic of Venice	Defeat
Sack of Brescia	18 February 1512	Italy	Republic of Venice	None	Republic of Venice	Victory
Battle of Ravenna	11 April 1512	Italy	Republic of Venice	Duchy of Ferrara	Spanish Empire Papal States	Victory
Battle of Ainhize	19 October 1512	Spain	Kingdom of Navarra	None	Spanish Empire	Victory
Spanish conquest of Iberian Navarre	1512–1524	Spain	Kingdom of Navarra	Kingdom of Navarra	Spanish Empire	Defeat
Battle of St. Mathieu	10 August 1512	France	Kingdom of France	Duchy of Brittany	Kingdom of England	Defeat
Battle of Novara	6 June 1513	Italy	Duchy of Milan	Republic of Venice	Republic of the Swiss Milan	Defeat
Battle of Guinegate	16 August 1513	France	Kingdom of France	None	Holy Roman Empire Kingdom of England	Defeat

=== Francis I (1515–1547) ===
Battle	Date	Current location	Contemporary location	Allies	Enemies	Result
War of the League of Cambrai (1508–1516)
Battle of Marignano	13–14 September 1515	Italy	Duchy of Milan	Republic of Venice	Republic of the Swiss	Victory
Italian War of 1521–1526
Battle of Pampluna	20 May 1521	Spain	Kingdom of Navarra	Kingdom of Navarra	(Spain) Spanish Empire	Victory
Battle of Noain-Esquiroz	30 June 1521	Spain	Kingdom of Navarra	Kingdom of Navarra	(Spain) Spanish Empire	Defeat
Siege of Mézières	1521	France	Kingdom of France	None	Holy Roman Empire	Victory
Siege of Tournai	November 1521	Belgium	Kingdom of France	None	Holy Roman Empire	Defeat
Battle of Bicocca	27 April 1522	Italy	Duchy of Milan	Republic of Venice	(Spain) Spanish Empire Holy Roman Empire Papal States Duchy of Milan	Defeat
Siege of Genoa	20–30 May 1522	Italy	Republic of Genoa	Republic of Genoa	(Spain) Spanish Empire Holy Roman Empire Papal States	Defeat
Battle of Neufchâteau	1523	France	Kingdom of France	None	Holy Roman Empire	Victory
Battle of the Sesia	30 April 1524	Italy	Duchy of Milan	None	Holy Roman Empire	Defeat
Siege of Marseille	August – September 1524	France	Kingdom of France	None	Holy Roman Empire	Victory
Battle of Binasco	24 October 1524	Italy	Duchy of Milan		(Spain) Spanish Empire Holy Roman Empire	Victory
Battle of Fiorenzuola	1524	Italy	Duchy of Milan		(Spain) Spanish Empire Holy Roman Empire	Victory
Battle of Pavia	24 February 1525	Italy	Duchy of Milan	None	(Spain) Spanish Empire Holy Roman Empire	Defeat
War of the League of Cognac (1526–1530)
Siege of Pavia	1527	Italy	Duchy of Milan	None	(Spain) Spanish Empire Holy Roman Empire	Victory
Battle of Capo d'Orso	28 April 1528	Italy	Kingdom of Naples	Republic of Venice Papal States Republic of Genoa	(Spain) Spanish Empire Holy Roman Empire	Victory
Battle of Landriano	21 June 1529	Italy	Duchy of Milan	Republic of Florence	(Spain) Spanish Empire Holy Roman Empire Republic of Genoa Papal States	Defeat
Ottoman–Habsburg wars (1526–1791)
Conquest of Tunis	June 1535	Tunisia	Ottoman Empire	Ottoman Empire	(Spain) Spanish Empire; Holy Roman Empire; Kingdom of Naples; Kingdom of Sicily; County of Flanders; Republic of Genoa; Kingdom of Portugal; Papal States (Sovereign Military Order of Malta) Knights of Malta	Defeat
Siege of Estergom	25 July – 10 August 1543	Hungary	Holy Roman Empire	Ottoman Empire	Holy Roman Empire	Victory
Italian War of 1536–1538
Siege of Péronne (1536)	1536	France	Kingdom of France	None	(Spain) Spanish Empire Holy Roman Empire	Victory
Italian War of 1542–1546
Siege of Perpignan	1542	France	(Spain) Spanish Empire	Ottoman Empire Jülich-Cleves-Berg	(Spain) Spanish Empire	Defeat
Siege of Luxembourg	1542	France	Holy Roman Empire	None	Holy Roman Empire	Victory
Battle of Muros Bay	25 July 1543	Spain	(Spain) Spanish Empire	None	(Spain) Spanish Empire	Defeat
Siege of Landrecies	August 1543	France	Kingdom of France	None	Holy Roman Empire	Victory
Siege of Nice	22 August 1543	France	Duchy of Savoy	Ottoman Empire	Holy Roman Empire Duchy of Savoy	Victory
Battle of Ceresole	11 April 1544	Italy	Duchy of Savoy	None	Holy Roman Empire	Victory
Siege of Carignao	1544	Italy	Duchy of Savoy	None	Holy Roman Empire	Victory
Battle of Serravalle	2 June 1544	San Marino	Republic of San Marino	Italian mercenaries	Holy Roman Empire	Defeat
Siege of St. Dizier	10 July – 17 August 1544	France	Kingdom of France	None	Holy Roman Empire	Defeat
Sieges of Boulogne	19 July – 18 September 1544	France	Kingdom of France	None	Kingdom of England	Defeat
Siege of Montreuil	May – October 1544	France	Kingdom of France	None	Kingdom of England	Victory
Battle of the Solent	18 July 1545	England	Kingdom of England	None	Kingdom of England	Indecisive
Battle of Bonchurch	July 1545	England	Kingdom of England	None	Kingdom of England	Defeat

=== Henry II (1547–1559) ===
Battle	Date	Current location	Contemporary location	Allies	Enemies	Result
Rough Wooing (1544–1551)
Siege of St Andrews Castle	1546–1547	Scotland	Kingdom of Scotland	Government of Scotland	Protestant Lairds of Fife; Kingdom of England	Victory
Siege of Broughty Castle	1547–1550	Scotland	Kingdom of Scotland	Kingdom of Scotland	Kingdom of England	Victory
Siege of Haddington	1548–1549	Scotland	Kingdom of Scotland	Kingdom of Scotland	Kingdom of England	Victory
Italian War of 1551–1559
Siege of Mirandola	July 1551 – March 1552	Italy	Duchy of Modena	Mirandola	Papal States Holy Roman Empire (Spain)	Victory
Battle of Ponza	5 August 1552	Tyrrhenian Sea	Idem	Ottoman Empire	Republic of Genoa	Victory
Siege of Metz	31 October 1552 – 5 January 1553	France	Holy Roman Empire	None	Holy Roman Empire	Victory
Invasion of Corsica	1553–1559	France	Republic of Genoa	Ottoman Empire Corsicans	Republic of Genoa	Victory
Battle of Marciano	2 August 1554	Italy	Republic of Siena	Republic of Siena	Duchy of Florence (Spain) Spanish Empire Holy Roman Empire	Defeat
Battle of Renty	12 August 1554	France	Kingdom of France	None	Holy Roman Empire	Victory
Battle of St. Quentin	10 August 1557	France	Kingdom of France	None	(Spain) Spanish Empire	Defeat
Siege of Calais	7 January 1558	France	Kingdom of England	None	Kingdom of England	Victory
Siege of Thionville	17 April – 23 June 1558	France	Kingdom of France	None	Holy Roman Empire	Victory
Battle of Gravelines	1–13 July 1558	France	(Spain) Spanish Empire	None	(Spain) Spanish Empire Kingdom of England	Defeat

=== Francis II (1559–1560) ===
Battle	Date	Current location	Contemporary location	Allies	Enemies	Result
Scottish Reformation crisis (1559–60)
Siege of Leith	1560	Scotland	Kingdom of Scotland	Catholic Scots	Protestant Scots Kingdom of England	Indecisive

=== Charles IX (1560–1574) ===
Battle	Date	Current location	Contemporary location	Allies	Enemies	Result
Ottoman–Habsburg wars (1526–1791)
Sieges of Oran and Mers El Kébir	April – June 1563	Algeria	Ottoman Empire	Ottoman Empire	(Spain) Spanish Empire	Defeat

=== Henry III (1574–1589) ===
Battle	Date	Current location	Contemporary location	Allies	Enemies	Result
War of the Portuguese Succession (1580–1583)
Battle of Salga	25 July 1581	Portugal	Portugal	(Portugal) Portuguese Loyalists	Spain Portugal under Philip of Spain	Victory
Battle of Ponta Delgada	26 July 1582	Portugal	Portugal	England (Portugal) Portuguese Loyalists	Spain Portugal under Philip of Spain	Defeat
Conquest of the Azores	2 August 1583	Portugal	Portugal	England (Portugal) Portuguese Loyalists	Spain Portugal under Philip of Spain	Defeat
Wars of Religion (1562–1598)
Siege of La Rochelle	1572–1573	France	Kingdom of France	None	La Rochelle French Protestants Kingdom of England	Indecisive
Battle of Craon	26 July 1582	France	Kingdom of France	French Protestants Kingdom of England	Catholic League (Spain) Spanish Empire	Defeat
Siege of Paris	May – September, 1590	France	Kingdom of France	French Protestants	Catholic League City of Paris (Spain) Spanish Empire	Defeat

== House of Bourbon (1589–1792) ==
=== Henry IV (1589–1610) ===
Battle	Date	Current location	Contemporary location	Allies	Enemies	Result
Wars of Religion (1562–1598)
Siege of Fort Crozon	1 October – 19 November 1594	France	Kingdom of France	England	(Spain) Spanish Empire	Victory
Battle of Fontaine-Française	5 June 1595	France	Kingdom of France	None	Catholic League (Spain) Spanish Empire	Victory
Siege of Calais	8–24 April 1596	France	Kingdom of France	None	(Spain) Spanish Empire	Defeat
Siege of Amiens	11 March – 25 September 1597	France	Kingdom of France	None	(Spain) Spanish Empire	Victory
Siege of Doullens	11–25 September 1597	France	Kingdom of France	None	(Spain) Spanish Empire	Defeat

=== Louis XIII (1610–1643) ===
Battle	Date	Current location	Contemporary location	Allies	Enemies	Result
Thirty Years' War (1618–1648)
Relief of Genoa	28 March – 24 April 1625	Italy	Republic of Genoa	Duchy of Savoy	(Spain) Spanish Empire Republic of Genoa	Defeat
Siege of Saint-Martin-de-Ré	12 July 1627 – 28 October 1628	France	Kingdom of France	None	Huguenots Kingdom of England	Victory
Siege of La Rochelle	September 1627 – October 1628	France	Kingdom of France	(Spain) Spanish Empire	La Rochelle Huguenot forces Kingdom of England	Victory
Battle of Pont du Feneau	November 1627	France	Kingdom of France	None	Kingdom of England	Victory
Battle of St. Kitts	17 June – 7 September 1629	Saint Kitts and Nevis	Kingdom of England/ Kingdom of France	Kingdom of England	(Spain) Spanish Empire	Defeat
Battle of Veillane	10 July 1630	Italy	Duchy of Savoy	None	(Spain) Spanish Empire	Victory
Battle of Les Avins	20 May 1635	Belgium	Holy Roman Empire	None	(Spain) Spanish Empire	Victory
Siege of Leuven	24 June – 4 July 1635	Belgium	(Spain) Spanish Empire	United Provinces	(Spain) Spanish Empire Holy Roman Empire	Defeat
Battle of Tornavento	22 June 1636	Italy	Duchy of Savoy	Duchy of Savoy	(Spain) Spanish Empire	Indecisive
Crossing of the Somme	5 August 1636	France	Kingdom of France	None	(Spain) Spanish Empire Holy Roman Empire Duchy of Lorraine	Defeat
Battle of Rheinfelden	28 February – 2 March 1638	Germany	Holy Roman Empire	Weimar Army	Holy Roman Empire Electorate of Bavaria	Victory
Battle of Guetaria	22 August 1638	Spain	(Spain) Spanish Empire	None	(Spain) Spanish Empire	Victory
Siege of Saint-Omer	May – July 1638	France	Kingdom of France	None	(Spain) Spanish Empire	Defeat
Siege of Fuenterrabía	June – September 1638	Spain	(Spain) Spanish Empire	None	(Spain) Spanish Empire	Defeat
Battle of Breisach	18 August – 17 December 1638	Germany	Holy Roman Empire	Weimar Army	Holy Roman Empire Bavaria	Victory
Relief of Thionville	6–7 June 1639	France	(Spain) Spanish Empire	None	Holy Roman Empire (Spain) Spanish Empire	Defeat
Siege of Salses	1639 – 1 January 1640	France	(Spain) Spanish Empire	None	(Spain) Spanish Empire	Defeat
Siege of Arras	16 June – 9 August 1640	France	(Spain) Spanish Empire	None	(Spain) Spanish Empire	Victory
Battle of Cádiz	21 July 1640	Bay of Cádiz	Idem	None	(Spain) Spanish Empire	Victory
Siege of Turin	22 May – 20 September 1640	Italy	Duchy of Savoy	None	(Spain) Spanish Empire	Victory
Battle of Montjuïc	26 January 1641	Spain	(Spain) Spanish Empire	Catalans	(Spain) Spanish Empire	Victory
Battle of La Marfée	6 July 1641	France	Principality of Sedan	None	Holy Roman Empire (Spain) Spanish Empire Principality of Sedan	Defeat
First Battle of Tarragona	4–6 July 1641	Spain	(Spain) Spanish Empire	None	(Spain) Spanish Empire	Victory
Second Battle of Tarragona	20–25 August 1641	Spain	(Spain) Spanish Empire	None	(Spain) Spanish Empire	Defeat
Battle of Kempen	17 January 1642	Germany	Holy Roman Empire	Hesse-Kassel	Holy Roman Empire	Victory
Battle of Montmeló	28 March 1642	Spain	(Spain) Spanish Empire	Catalans	(Spain) Spanish Empire	Victory
Battle of Honnecourt	26 May 1642	France	(Spain) Spanish Empire	None	(Spain) Spanish Empire	Defeat
Battle of Barcelona	3 July 1642	Balearic Sea	Idem	None	(Spain) Spanish Empire	Victory
Battle of Lerida	7 October 1642	Spain	(Spain) Spanish Empire	Catalans	(Spain) Spanish Empire	Victory

=== Louis XIV (1643–1715) ===
Battle	Date	Location	Allies	Enemies	Result
Thirty Years' War (1618–1648)
Battle of Rocroi	19 May 1643	France	None	Spain	Victory
Battle of Cartagena	3 September 1643	Spain	None	Spain	Victory
Battle of Tuttlingen	24 November 1643	Germany	None	Holy Roman Empire Spain Bavaria	Defeat
Battle of Freiburg	9 August 1644	Germany	None	Holy Roman Empire Bavaria	Indecisive
Battle of Herbsthausen	2 May 1645	Germany	None	Holy Roman Empire Bavaria	Defeat
Battle of Nördlingen	3 August 1645	Germany	Hesse-Kassel	Holy Roman Empire Bavaria	Victory
Battle of Orbitello	14 June 1646	Italy	None	Spain	Defeat
Battle of Zusmarshausen	17 May 1648	Germany	Sweden	Holy Roman Empire Bavaria	Victory
Battle of Lens	20 August 1648	France	None	Spain	Victory
Siege of Barcelona	10 October 1652	Spain	Catalans	Spain	Defeat
Battle of Bordeaux	20 October 1653	France	None	Spain	Defeat
Battle of Arras	23–25 August 1654	France	None	Spain	Victory
Siege of Landrecies	19 June – 13 July 1655	France	None	Spain	Victory
Battle of Valenciennes	16 July 1656	France	None	Spain	Defeat
Battle of the Dunes	4 June 1658	France	England	Spain	Victory
Austro-Turkish War (1663–1664) (1663–1664)
Battle of Saint Gotthard	1 August 1664	Hungary	Holy Roman Empire	Ottoman Empire	Victory
War of Devolution (1667–1668)
Siege of Charleroi	31 May 1667 – 2 June 1667	Belgium	None	Spain	Victory
Siege of Tournai	21–26 June 1667	Belgium	None	Spain United Provinces	Victory
Siege of Lille	10–28 August 1667	France	None	Spain	Victory
Franco-Dutch War (1672–1678)
Siege of Groenlo	1–10 June 1672	Netherlands	Cologne Münster	United Provinces	Victory
Battle of Solebay	7 June 1672	England	England	United Provinces	Defeat
Battle of Schooneveld	7 June 1673	Netherlands	England	United Provinces	Defeat
Siege of Maastricht	13–26 June 1673	Netherlands	None	United Provinces Spain	Victory
Battle of Texel	21 August 1673	Netherlands	England	United Provinces	Defeat
Siege of Naarden	25 July – 27 October 1674	Netherlands	None	Dutch Republic Spain Brandenburg-Prussia	Defeat
Siege of Bonn	6–13 September 1673	Germany	None	Dutch Republic Spain	Defeat
Battle of Sinsheim	16 June 1674	Germany	None	Holy Roman Empire	Victory
Siege of Grave	25 July – 27 October 1674	Netherlands	None	Dutch Republic Spain Brandenburg-Prussia	Defeat
Battle of Seneffe	11 August 1674	Belgium	None	Dutch Republic Holy Roman Empire Spain	Indecisive
Battle of Entzheim	4 October 1674	France	None	Holy Roman Empire	Indecisive
Battle of Mulhouse	29 December 1674	France	None	Holy Roman Empire	Victory
Battle of Turckheim	5 January 1675	France	None	Holy Roman Empire Brandenburg-Prussia	Victory
Battle of Salzbach	27 July 1675	Germany	None	Holy Roman Empire	Indecisive
Battle of Konzer Brücke	11 August 1675	Germany	None	Holy Roman Empire	Defeat
Battle of Stromboli	8 January 1676	Italy	None	United Provinces	Indecisive
Battle of Augusta	22 April 1676	Italy	None	United Provinces Spain	Indecisive
Siege of Philippsburg	1 May 1676 – 17 September 1676	Germany	None	Holy Roman Empire	Defeat
Battle of Palermo	2 June 1676	Italy	None	United Provinces Spain	Victory
Siege of Valenciennes	1676 – 17 March 1677	France	None	Spain	Victory
Battle of Tobago	3 March 1677	Trinidad and Tobago	None	United Provinces	Defeat
Siege of Cambrai	20 March – 19 April 1677	France	None	Spain	Victory
French capture of Gorée	1677	Senegal	None	United Provinces	Victory
Battle of Cassel	11 April 1677	France	None	United Provinces	Victory
Battle of Saint-Denis	14–15 August 1678	Belgium	None	United Provinces Spain	Indecisive
War of the Reunions (1681–1684)
Siege of Strasbourg	28–30 September 1681	France	None	Free imperial city of Strasbourg	Victory
Siege of Courtrai	1–6 November 1683	Belgium	None	Spain	Victory
Capture of Dixmude	10 November 1683	Belgium	None	Spain	Victory
Siege of Luxembourg	28 April – 3 June 1684	Luxembourg	None	Spain	Victory
Bombardment of Genoa	18–28 May 1684	Italy	None	Republic of Genoa	Victory
Siamese revolution (1688)
Siege of Bangkok	June 1688 – 13 November 1688	Thailand	None	Kingdom of Siam	Defeat
War of the League of Augsburg (1688–1697)
Siege of Philippsburg	27 September – 29 October 1688	Germany	None	Holy Roman Empire	Victory
Sack of Palatinate	1689	Germany	None	Holy Roman Empire	Victory
Battle of Bantry Bay	11 May 1689	Ireland	None	England	Victory
Siege of Mayence	1 June 1689	Germany	None	Holy Roman Empire	Defeat
Battle of Walcourt	25 August 1689	Belgium	None	Dutch Republic England Scotland Holy Roman Empire Spain	Defeat
Battle of Fleurus	1 July 1690	Belgium	None	Dutch Republic Holy Roman Empire Spain	Victory
Battle of Beachy Head	10 July 1690	English Channel	None	Dutch Republic England	Victory
Battle of the Boyne	12 July 1690	Ireland	Jacobite forces	Williamite forces Dutch Republic	Defeat
Battle of Staffarda	18 August 1690	Italy	None	Duchy of Savoy Spain	Victory
Battle of Quebec	16–24 October 1690	Canada	None	England	Victory
Siege of Cuneo	28 June 1691	Italy	None	Duchy of Savoy Holy Roman Empire	Defeat
Siege of Mons	15 March – 10 April 1691	Belgium	None	Dutch Republic Spain Holy Roman Empire	Victory
Battle of La Prairie	11 August 1691	Canada	None	England	Victory
Siege of Limerick	August – October 1691	Ireland	Jacobite forces	Williamite forces Dutch Republic	Defeat
Battle of Leuze	18 September 1691	Belgium	None	England Dutch Republic Scotland	Victory
Battle of Aughrim	12 July 1691	Ireland	Jacobite forces	Williamite forces Dutch Republic	Defeat
Battles of Barfleur and La Hogue	29 May 1692	English Channel	None	England Dutch Republic	Defeat
Action at Cherbourg	1–2 June 1692	English Channel	None	England Dutch Republic	Defeat
Siege of Namur	25 May – 30 June 1692	Belgium	None	Spain Holy Roman Empire Dutch Republic	Victory
Battle of Steenkerque	3 August 1692	Belgium	None	England United Provinces Scotland	Victory
Battle of Lagos	27 June 1693	Portugal	None	England Dutch Republic	Victory
Battle of Landen	29 July 1693	Belgium	None	England Scotland Dutch Republic	Victory
Battle of Marsaglia	4 October 1693	Italy	None	Savoy Spain	Victory
Siege of Charleroi	10 September – 11 October 1693	Belgium	None	Spain	Victory
Battle of Torroella	27 May 1694	Spain	None	Spain	Victory
Battle of Camaret	18 June 1694	France	None	England, Dutch Republic	Victory
Action of 29 June 1694	29 June 1694	Netherlands	None	Dutch Republic	Victory
Siege of Huy	22–27 September 1694	Belgium	None	Dutch Republic England Scotland Holy Roman Empire Spain	Defeat
Siege of Namur	2 July – 5 September 1695	Belgium	None	Holy Roman Empire England Scotland Dutch Republic	Defeat
Bombardment of Brussels	13–15 July 1695	Belgium	None	Holy Roman Empire	Indecisive
Battle of Dogger Bank	17 June 1696	North Sea	None	Dutch Republic	Victory
Raid on Cartagena	13 April 1697	Colombia	None	Spain	Victory
Siege of Barcelona	15 June – 8 August 1697	Spain	None	Spain	Victory
Battle of Hudson's Bay	5 September 1697	Canada	None	England	Victory
War of the Spanish Succession (1701–1714)
Battle of Carpi	9 July 1701	Italy	None	Holy Roman Empire	Defeat
Battle of Chiari	1 September 1701	Italy	Kingdom of Spain Duchy of Savoy	Holy Roman Empire	Defeat
Battle of Cremona	1 February 1702	Italy	None	Holy Roman Empire	Indecisive
Assault on Nijmegen	10 and 11 June 1702	Netherlands	None	Dutch Republic England	Defeat
Battle of Luzzara	15 August 1702	Italy	None	Holy Roman Empire	Indecisive
Newfoundland expedition (1702)	28 August – 11 October 1702	Canada	None	England	Defeat
Siege of Venlo (1702)	11–23 September 1702	Netherlands	Spain	Dutch Republic England	Defeat
Capture of Liège (1702)	13 October – 31 October 1702	Belgium	Spain	Dutch Republic England	Defeat
Battle of Friedlingen	14 October 1702	Germany	None	Holy Roman Empire	Victory
Battle of Vigo Bay	23 October 1702	Spain	Spain	England Dutch Republic	Defeat
Siege of Kehl	20 February 1703 – 10 March 1703	Germany	None	Holy Roman Empire	Victory
Battle of Cap de la Roque	22 May 1703	Portugal	None	Dutch Republic	Victory
Battle of Ekeren	30 June 1703	Belgium	Spain	Dutch Republic	Indecisive
Northeast Coast campaign (1703)	10 August – 6 October 1703	United States	Abenaki	England	Victory
Battle of Höchstädt	20 September 1703	Germany	Bavaria	Holy Roman Empire	Victory
Battle of Speyerbach	15 November 1703	Germany	None	Hesse-Kassel Electorate of the Palatinate	Victory
Raid on Deerfield	29 February 1704	United States	Native Americans	England	Victory
Raid on Grand Pré	24–26 June (3–5 July New Style) 1704	Canada	Mi'kmaq	England	Defeat
Battle of Schellenberg	2 July 1704	Germany	Bavaria	England Dutch Republic Habsburg Monarchy	Defeat
Battle of Blenheim	13 August 1704	Germany	Bavaria	Habsburg Monarchy (Kingdom of Prussia) Brandenburg–Prussia Hesse-Kassel Hesse-Homburg England Scotland Dutch Republic	Defeat
Battle of Vélez-Málaga	24 August 1704	Spain	Kingdom of Spain	Kingdom of England United Provinces	Indecisive
Battle of Bonavista	18 August 1704	Canada	Abenaki	Kingdom of England	Defeat
Twelfth siege of Gibraltar	September 1704 – May 1705	Gibraltar	Kingdom of Spain	Kingdom of England United Provinces (Habsburg monarchy) Habsburg Austria Pro-Habsburg Spain Portugal	Defeat
Siege of St. John's	1 February – 5 March 1705	Canada	Mi'kmaq Abenakis	Kingdom of England	Defeat
Battle of Cabrita point	March 1705	Spain	Kingdom of Spain	Kingdom of England United Provinces Portugal	Defeat
Battle of Elixheim	18 July 1705	Belgium	None	England Dutch Republic (Habsburg monarchy) Habsburg Austria Scotland	Defeat
Battle of Cassano	16 August 1705	Italy	None	(Habsburg monarchy) Habsburg Austria Prussia	Victory
Battle of Montjuïc	13–17 September 1705	Spain	Kingdom of Spain	(Habsburg monarchy) Habsburg Austria England Dutch Republic Pro-Habsburg Spain	Defeat
First Siege of Barcelona	14 September – 19 October 1705	Spain	Pro-Bourbon Spain	England (Holy Roman Empire) Austria Portugal Dutch Republic Pro-Habsburg Spain	Defeat
Second Siege of Barcelona	3–27 April 1706	Spain	Pro-Bourbon Spain	England (Holy Roman Empire) Austria Portugal Dutch Republic Pro-Habsburg Spain	Defeat
Battle of Calcinato	19 April 1706	Italy	Kingdom of Spain	(Habsburg monarchy) Habsburg Austria	Victory
Battle of Ramillies	23 May 1706	Belgium	Electorate of Bavaria Spain	Dutch Republic England Scotland	Defeat
Charles Town expedition	August 1706	Canada	Spain	England	Defeat
Battle of Turin	7 September 1706	Italy	Spain	(Habsburg monarchy) Habsburg Austria Duchy of Savoy Prussia	Defeat
Battle of Castiglione	8 September 1706	Italy	None	Hesse-Kassel	Victory
Battle of Almansa	25 April 1707	Spain	Kingdom of Spain	Great Britain Portugal Dutch Republic	Victory
Battle of Beachy Head	2 May 1707	English Channel	None	England	Victory
First siege of Port Royal	17–28 June 1707	Canada	Wabanaki	England	Victory
Battle of Toulon	29 July – 21 August 1707	France	Kingdom of Spain	Austria Duchy of Savoy Great Britain	Victory
Second siege of Port Royal	20–31 August 1707	Canada	Wabanaki	Great Britain	Victory
Battle at The Lizard	21 October 1707	English Channel	None	Great Britain	Victory
Battle of Oudenarde	11 July 1708	Belgium	None	Great Britain Dutch Republic (Holy Roman Empire) Austria Prussia	Defeat
Siege of Lille	28 July – 28 October 1708	France	None	United Provinces Great Britain (Habsburg monarchy) Habsburg Austria	Defeat
Raid on Haverhill (1708)	29 August 1708	United States	Algonquin Innu	Great Britain	Victory
Capture of Minorca (1708)	14–21 September 1708	Spain	Kingdom of Spain	Great Britain United Provinces	Defeat
Battle of Wijnendale	28 September 1708	Belgium	Kingdom of Spain	Great Britain United Provinces	Defeat
Assault on Brussels (1708)	22 November 1708 – 27 November 1708	Belgium	Bavaria Kingdom of Spain	Pro-Habsburg Spain United Provinces (Habsburg monarchy) Habsburg Austria Great Britain	Defeat
Battle of St. John's	1 January 1709	Canada	Mi'kmaq Abenaki	Great Britain	Victory
Battle of Fort Albany (1709)	26 June 1709	Canada	Mohawks of Kahnawà:ke	Great Britain	Defeat
Siege of Tournai (1709)	28 June – 3 September 1709	Belgium	None	United Provinces Great Britain Habsburg Monarchy Prussia	Defeat
Battle of Malplaquet	11 September 1709	France	Electorate of Bavaria	Great Britain Habsburg Monarchy United Provinces Prussia	Defeat
Third siege of Port Royal	24 September – 1 October 1710	Canada	Wabanaki	Great Britain Haudenosaunee	Defeat
Battle of Syracuse	9 November 1710	Italy	None	Great Britain	Victory
Battle of Brihuega	8 December 1710	Spain	Kingdom of Spain	Great Britain	Victory
Battle of Villaviciosa	10 December 1710	None	Kingdom of Spain	Great Britain Austria United Provinces Portugal	Victory
Siege of Bouchain	5 August – 12 September 1711	France	None	Great Britain Dutch Republic (Habsburg monarchy) Habsburg Austria	Defeat
Quebec Expedition	22 August 1711	Canada	None	Great Britain	Victory
Battle of Denain	24 July 1712	France	None	Dutch Republic Austria	Victory
Siege of Barcelona	25 July 1713 – 11 September 1714	Spain	Spain loyal to Philip V of Spain	(Holy Roman Empire) Habsburg monarchy Spain loyal to Archduke Charles	Victory

=== Louis XV (1715–1774) ===
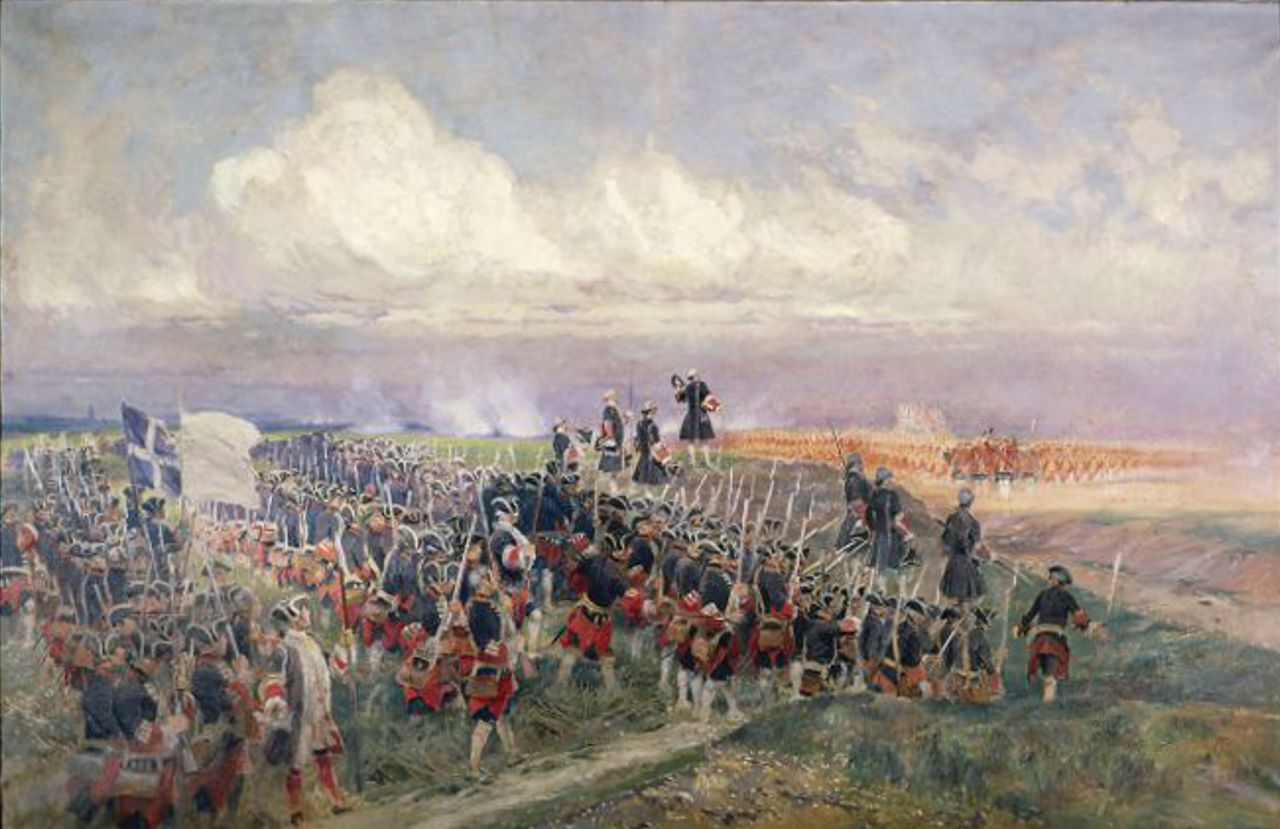
French Guards at the Battle of Fontenoy (1745), during the War of the Austrian Succession. Painting by Édouard Detaille

Battle	Date	Current location	Contemporary location	Allies	Enemies	Result
War of the Quadruple Alliance (1718–1720)
Capture of Pensacola	1719	United States	Spain	None	Spain	Victory
War of the Polish Succession (1733–1738)
Siege of Kehl	13 October 1733	Germany	(Habsburg monarchy) Habsburg Empire	None	(Habsburg monarchy) Habsburg Empire	Victory
Siege of Pizzighettone	11 November – 9 December 1733	Italy	(Habsburg monarchy) Habsburg Empire	Kingdom of Sardinia	(Habsburg monarchy) Habsburg Empire	Victory
Siege of Philippsburg	2 June – 18 July 1734	Germany	(Habsburg monarchy) Habsburg Empire	None	(Habsburg monarchy) Habsburg Empire	Victory
Siege of Danzig	22 February – 9 July 1734	Poland	Poland-Lithuania	Poland-Lithuania Sweden	Russia Electorate of Saxony	Defeat
Battle of San Pietro	29 June 1734	Italy	(Habsburg monarchy) Habsburg Empire	Kingdom of Sardinia	(Habsburg monarchy) Habsburg Empire	Victory
Siege of Gaeta	6 August 1734	Italy	(Habsburg monarchy) Habsburg Empire	Spain	(Habsburg monarchy) Habsburg Empire	Victory
Battle of Guastalla	19 September 1734	Italy	(Habsburg monarchy) Habsburg Empire	Kingdom of Sardinia	(Habsburg monarchy) Habsburg Empire	Victory
Battle of Clausen	20 October 1735	Germany	(Habsburg monarchy) Habsburg Empire	None	(Habsburg monarchy) Habsburg Empire	Defeat
War of the Austrian Succession (1740–1748)
Battle of Sahay	24 May 1742	Czech Republic	(Habsburg monarchy) Habsburg Empire	None	(Habsburg monarchy) Habsburg Empire	Victory
Siege of Prague	June – December 1742	Czech Republic	(Habsburg monarchy) Habsburg Empire	None	(Habsburg monarchy) Habsburg Empire	Indecisive
Battle of Dettingen	27 June 1743	Germany	(Habsburg monarchy) Habsburg Empire	None	Great Britain (Province of Hanover) Hanover Habsburg Empire	Defeat
Battle of Toulon	22 February 1744	France	Kingdom of France	Spain	Great Britain	Victory
Action of 8 May 1744	8 May 1744	Atlantic Ocean	Idem	None	Great Britain	Victory
Raid on Canso	23 May 1744	Canada	Great Britain	None	Great Britain	Victory
Battle of Villafranca	20 April 1744	France	Savoy	Spain	Great Britain Savoy	Victory
First siege of Annapolis Royal	1 July – 6 October 1744	Canada	Great Britain	None	Great Britain	Defeat
Battle of Casteldelfino	18 July 1744	Italy		None	Sardinia	Victory
Battle of Madonna dell'Olmo	30 September 1744	Italy		Spain	Sardinia	Victory
Siege of Louisbourg	1 May – 16 June 1745	Canada	Kingdom of France	Mi'kmaq	Great Britain	Defeat
Siege of Port Toulouse	2–10 May 1745	Canada	Kingdom of France	Mi'kmaq	Great Britain	Defeat
Second siege of Annapolis Royal	2–23 May 1745	Canada	Great Britain	Mi'kmaq	Great Britain	Defeat
Battle of Fontenoy	11 May 1745	Belgium	Habsburg Empire	None	Great Britain (Province of Hanover) Hanover Habsburg Empire Dutch Republic	Victory
Battle of Pfaffenhofen	15 April 1745	Germany		Bavaria	Habsburg Empire	Defeat
Action of 15 June 1745	15 June 1745	Northumberland Strait	Idem	Mi'kmaq Wolastoqiyik Wendat	Great Britain	Defeat
Battle of Melle	9 July 1745	Belgium	Habsburg Empire	None	Great Britain (Province of Hanover) Hanover Habsburg Empire Dutch Republic	Victory
Fall of Ghent	15 July 1745	Belgium	Habsburg Empire	None	Great Britain (Province of Hanover) Hanover Habsburg Empire Dutch Republic	Victory
Northeast Coast Campaign	19 July – 5 September 1745	United States	Great Britain	Wabanaki Confederacy	Great Britain	Victory
Battle of Bassignano	27 September 1745	Italy		Spain	Habsburg Empire Sardinia	Victory
Raid on Saratoga	28 November 1745	United States	Great Britain	None	Great Britain	Victory
Siege of Brussels	January – February 1746	Belgium	Habsburg Empire	None	Habsburg Empire	Victory
Siege of Fort William	20 March – 3 April 1746	United Kingdom	Great Britain	Jacobite clans	Hanoverian clans	Defeat
Battle of Culloden	16 April 1746	United Kingdom	Great Britain	Jacobite clans	Great Britain	Defeat
Siege of Fort at Number 4	7–11 April 1746	United States	Great Britain	None	Great Britain	Defeat
Battle of Piacenza	16 June 1746	Italy		Spain	Habsburg Empire	Defeat
Battle of Port-la-Joye	11 July 1746	Canada	Kingdom of France	Mi'kmaq	Great Britain	Victory
Battle of Rottofreddo	12 August 1746	Italy		None	Habsburg Empire	Victory
Siege of Fort Massachusetts	19–20 August 1746	United States	Great Britain	Native Americans	Great Britain	Victory
Battle of Madras	7–9 September 1746	India		None	Great Britain	Victory
Raid on Lorient	20 September 1746	France	Kingdom of France	None	Great Britain	Victory
Battle of Adyar	29 October 1746	India		None	Nawab of the Carnatic	Victory
Battle of Rocoux	11 October 1746	Belgium	Holy Roman Empire	None	Great Britain (Province of Hanover) Hanover Habsburg Empire Dutch Republic	Victory
Battle of Grand Pré	10–11 February 1747	Canada	Kingdom of France	None	Great Britain	Victory
First Battle of Cape Finisterre	14 May 1747	Spain		None	Great Britain	Defeat
Battle of Lauffeld	2 July 1747	Belgium	Dutch Republic	None	Great Britain (Province of Hanover) Hanover Habsburg Empire Dutch Republic	Victory
Siege of Bergen op Zoom	July – September 1747	Netherlands	Dutch Republic	None	Great Britain Dutch Republic	Victory
Siege of Genoa	1747	Italy		Republic of Genoa Spain	(Habsburg monarchy) Habsburg Empire Kingdom of Sardinia	Victory
Battle of Assietta	19 July 1747	France	Kingdom of France	None	Kingdom of Sardinia	Defeat
Second Battle of Cape Finisterre	25 October 1747	Spain		None	Great Britain	Defeat
Battle of Saint-Louis-du-Sud	25 October 1747	Caribbean	Idem	None	Great Britain	Defeat
Siege of Maastricht	April – May 1748	Netherlands	Dutch Republic	None	Dutch Republic	Victory
Siege of Pondicherry	August – October 1748	India	Kingdom of France	None	Dutch Republic	Victory
Seven Years' War (1756–1763)
European theater of the Seven Years' War
Siege of Fort St. Philip	April – 29 June 1756	Spain	Great Britain	None	Great Britain	Victory
Battle of Minorca	20 May 1756	Spain	Great Britain	None	Great Britain	Victory
Battle of Hastenbeck	26 July 1757	Germany		None	(Province of Hanover) Hanover Great Britain Hesse-Kassel Brunswick	Victory
Raid on Rochefort	September 1757	France	Kingdom of France	None	Great Britain	Victory
Battle of Rossbach	5 November 1757	Germany		(Holy Roman Empire) Habsburg Empire	Prussia	Defeat
Battle of Cartagena	28 February 1758	Spain		None	Great Britain	Defeat
Raid on St Malo	5–12 June 1758	France	Kingdom of France	None	Great Britain	Defeat
Battle of Rheinberg	12 June 1758	Germany		None	(Province of Hanover) Hanover Prussia Hesse-Kassel Great Britain	Indecisive
Battle of Krefeld	23 June 1758	Germany		None	(Province of Hanover) Hanover Prussia Hesse-Kassel Great Britain	Defeat
Raid on Cherbourg	7 August 1758 – 16 August 1758	France	Kingdom of France	None	Great Britain	Defeat
Battle of Saint Cast	11 September 1758	France	Kingdom of France	None	Great Britain	Victory
Battle of Lutterberg	10 October 1758	Germany		None	(Province of Hanover) Hanover Great Britain	Victory
Battle of Bergen	13 April 1759	Germany		None	Great Britain Hesse-Kassel Brunswick (Province of Hanover) Hanover	Victory
Raid on Le Havre	3–5 July 1759	France	Kingdom of France	None	Great Britain	Defeat
Battle of Minden	1 August 1759	Germany		Saxony	Great Britain (Province of Hanover) Hanover Hesse-Kassel Brunswick Schaumburg-Lippe	Defeat
Battle of Lagos	18–19 August 1759	Portugal		None	Great Britain	Defeat
Battle of Quiberon Bay	20 November 1759	France	Kingdom of France	None	Great Britain	Defeat
Battle of Carrickfergus	21–26 February 1760	United Kingdom	Great Britain	None	Great Britain	Indecisive
Battle of Corbach	10 July 1760	Germany		None	(Province of Hanover) Hanover Great Britain Brunswick Hesse-Kassel	Victory
Battle of Emsdorf	14 July 1760	Germany		None	Great Britain (Province of Hanover) Hanover Hesse-Kassel	Defeat
Battle of Warburg	31 July 1760	Germany		None	(Province of Hanover) Hanover Great Britain Brunswick Hesse-Kassel	Defeat
Battle of Kloster Kampen	15 October 1760	Germany		None	Great Britain Prussia (Province of Hanover) Hanover Brunswick Hesse-Kassel	Victory
Battle of Langensalza	10 February 1761	Germany		None	Prussia (Province of Hanover) Hanover	Defeat
First siege of Cassel	March 1761	Germany		None	(Province of Hanover) Hanover	Victory
Battle of Grünberg	21 March 1761	Germany		None	Prussia (Province of Hanover) Hanover	Victory
Capture of Belle Île	7 April – 8 June 1761	France	Kingdom of France	None	Great Britain	Defeat
Battle of Villinghausen	15–16 July 1761	Germany		None	Great Britain (Province of Hanover) Hanover Prussia	Defeat
Battle of Ölper	13 October 1761	Germany		Saxony	Brunswick	Defeat
Battle of Wilhelmsthal	24 June 1762	Germany		None	Great Britain Prussia (Province of Hanover) Hanover Brunswick Hesse-Kassel	Defeat
Battle of Lutterberg	23 July 1762	Germany		Saxony	Hanover Brunswick Great Britain	Defeat
Battle of Nauheim	30 August 1762	Germany		None	Great Britain (Province of Hanover) Hanover	Victory
Second Siege of Cassel	October – November 1762	Germany		None	Great Britain (Province of Hanover) Hanover Brunswick Hesse-Kassel	Defeat
American theater of the Seven Years' War
Battle of Jumonville Glen	28 May 1754	United States	Ohio Country	None	Great Britain Ohio Iroquois	Defeat
Battle of Fort Necessity	3 July 1754	United States	Great Britain	Wyandot (Hurons) Odawas Nipissings	Great Britain	Victory
Battle of Fort Beauséjour	3–16 June 1755	Canada	Kingdom of France	None	Great Britain	Defeat
Action of 8 June 1755	8 June 1755	Atlantic Ocean	Idem	None	Great Britain	Defeat
Braddock expedition	9 July 1755	United States	Ohio Country	Odawas Ojibwe Potawatomis	Great Britain	Victory
Battle of the Monongahela	9 July 1755	United States	Ohio Country	Native Americans	Great Britain	Victory
Battle of Petitcodiac	3 September 1755	Canada	Kingdom of France	None	Great Britain	Victory
Battle of Lake George	8 September 1755	United States	Great Britain	Abenaki Nipissing	Great Britain Haudenosaunee	Defeat
Battle of Fort Bull	27 March 1756	United States	Great Britain	Canadian Iroquois Huron-Wendats	Great Britain	Victory
Battle of Fort Oswego	10–14 August 1756	United States	Great Britain	Native Americans	Great Britain	Victory
Battle on Snowshoes	21 January 1757	United States	Great Britain	Native Americans	Great Britain	Indecisive
Battle of Sabbath Day Point	23 July 1757	United States	Great Britain	Native Americans	Great Britain	Victory
Siege of Fort William Henry	3 August 1757	United States	Great Britain	Hurons	Great Britain	Victory
Louisbourg Expedition	September 1757	Canada	Kingdom of France	None	Great Britain	Victory
Battle of Cap-Français	21 October 1757	Caribbean	Idem	None	Great Britain	Indecisive
Attack on German Flatts	12 November 1757	United States	Great Britain	Native Americans	Great Britain	Victory
Battle on Snowshoes	23 March 1758	United States	Great Britain	None	Great Britain	Victory
Battle of Bloody Creek	8 December 1757	Canada	Great Britain	None	Great Britain	Victory
Siege of Louisbourg	8 June – 26 July 1758	Canada	Kingdom of France	None	Great Britain	Defeat
Battle of Carillon	8 July 1758	United States	Kingdom of France	Native Americans	Great Britain	Victory
Battle of Fort Frontenac	25–27 August 1758	Canada	Kingdom of France	None	Great Britain	Defeat
Battle of Fort Duquesne	13 September 1758	United States	Kingdom of France	Native Americans	Great Britain	Victory
Battle of Fort Ligonier	12 October 1758	United States	Kingdom of France	Native Americans	Great Britain	Defeat
Invasion of Martinique	16–19 January 1759	France	Kingdom of France	None	Great Britain	Victory
Invasion of Guadeloupe	22 January – 1 May 1759	France	Kingdom of France	None	Great Britain	Defeat
Battle of Fort Niagara	6–26 July 1759	United States	Kingdom of France	None	Great Britain Haudenosaunee	Defeat
Battle of La Belle-Famille	24 July 1759	United States	Kingdom of France	Native Americans	Great Britain Haudenosaunee	Defeat
Battle of Ticonderoga	26–27 July 1759	United States	Kingdom of France	None	Great Britain	Defeat
Battle of Beauport	31 July 1759	Canada	Kingdom of France	None	Great Britain	Victory
Battle of the Plains of Abraham	13 September 1759	Canada	Kingdom of France	Native Americans	Great Britain	Defeat
Battle of Sainte-Foy	28 April 1760	Canada	Kingdom of France	None	Great Britain	Victory
Battle of Restigouche	3–8 July 1760	Canada	Kingdom of France	Mi'kmaqs	Great Britain	Defeat
Battle of the Thousand Islands	16–24 August 1760	Canada/United States	Kingdom of France	None	Great Britain	Defeat
Invasion of Dominica	June 1761	Dominica	Kingdom of France	None	Great Britain	Defeat
Capture of Martinique	5 January – 12 February 1762	France	Kingdom of France	None	Great Britain	Defeat
Battle of Signal Hill	15 September 1762	Canada	Great Britain	None	Great Britain Haudenosaunee	Defeat
Asian theater of the Seven Years' War
Battle of Chandannagar	23 March 1757	India	Kingdom of France	None	Great Britain	Defeat
Battle of Plassey	23 June 1757	India	Maratha Empire	Nawab of Bengal	Great Britain	Defeat
Battle of Cuddalore	29 October 1758	Bay of Bengal	Idem	None	Great Britain	Victory
Battle of Negapatam	3 August 1758	Bay of Bengal	Idem	None	Great Britain	Indecisive
Battle of Condore	9 December 1758	India	Maratha Empire	None	Great Britain	Defeat
Battle of Pondicherry	10 September 1758	Bay of Bengal	Idem	None	Great Britain	Victory
Siege of Masulipatam	6 March – 7 April 1759	India	Kingdom of France	None	Great Britain	Defeat
Siege of Madras	December 1758 and February 1759	India	Great Britain	None	Great Britain	Defeat
Battle of Wandiwash	22 January 1760	India	Maratha Empire	None	Great Britain	Defeat
Siege of Pondicherry	4 September 1760 – 15 January 1761	India	Kingdom of France	None	Great Britain	Defeat
French colonisation of Africa
Larache expedition	June 1765	Morocco	Morocco	None	Morocco	Defeat
Conquest of Corsica (1768–1769)
Battle of Borgo	8–9 October 1768	France		None	Corsican Republic	Defeat
Battle of Ponte Novu	8–9 May 1769	France		None	Corsican Republic	Victory

=== Louis XVI (1774–1792) ===
Battle	Date	Current location	Contemporary location	Allies	Enemies	Result
American Revolutionary War (1775–1783)
First Battle of Ushant	27 July 1778	Bay of Biscay	Idem	None	Kingdom of Great Britain	Victory
Siege of Pondicherry	21 August – 19 October 1778	India	Kingdom of France	None	Kingdom of Great Britain	Defeat
Invasion of Dominica	7 September 1778	Dominica	Kingdom of Great Britain	None	Kingdom of Great Britain	Victory
Battle of St. Lucia	15 December 1778	Caribbean	Idem	None	Kingdom of Great Britain	Defeat
Capture of St. Lucia	18–28 December 1778	Saint Lucia	Kingdom of Great Britain	None	Kingdom of Great Britain	Defeat
Action of 13 May 1779	13 May 1779	English Channel	Idem	None	Kingdom of Great Britain	Defeat
Capture of Saint Vincent	16–18 June 1779	Saint Vincent and the Grenadines	Kingdom of Great Britain	None	Kingdom of Great Britain	Victory
Great Siege of Gibraltar	24 June 1779 – 7 February 1783	Gibraltar	Kingdom of Great Britain	Spain	Kingdom of Great Britain (Province of Hanover) Hanover	Defeat
Capture of Grenada	2–4 July 1779	Grenada	Kingdom of Great Britain	None	Kingdom of Great Britain	Victory
Battle of Grenada	6 July 1779	Caribbean	Idem	None	Kingdom of Great Britain	Victory
Siege of Savannah	16 September – 18 October 1779	United States	Kingdom of Great Britain	United States	Kingdom of Great Britain	Defeat
Battle of Flamborough Head	23 September 1779	North Sea	Idem	United States	Kingdom of Great Britain	Indecisive
First Battle of Martinique	18 December 1779	Caribbean	Idem	None	Kingdom of Great Britain	Defeat
Second Battle of Martinique	17 April 1780	Caribbean	Idem	None	Kingdom of Great Britain	Indecisive
Action of 9 August 1780	9 August 1780	Atlantic Ocean	Idem	Spain	Kingdom of Great Britain	Victory
Action of 13 August 1780	13 August 1780	Atlantic Ocean	Idem	None	Kingdom of Great Britain	Defeat
Action of 30 September 1780	30 September 1780	Atlantic Ocean	Kingdom of Great Britain	None	Kingdom of Great Britain	Defeat
Battle of Jersey	6 January 1781	Jersey	Kingdom of Great Britain	None	Kingdom of Great Britain	Defeat
Siege of Pensacola	9 March – 8 May 1781	United States	Kingdom of Great Britain	Spain	Kingdom of Great Britain	Victory
Battle of Cape Henry	16 March 1781	United States	Kingdom of Great Britain	None	Kingdom of Great Britain	Indecisive
Battle of Porto Praya	16 April 1781	Cape Verde	Kingdom of Portugal	None	Kingdom of Great Britain	Victory
Battle of Fort Royal	29–30 April 1781	Caribbean	Idem	None	Kingdom of Great Britain	Victory
Invasion of Tobago	24 May – 2 June 1781	Caribbean	Idem	None	Kingdom of Great Britain	Victory
Naval battle off Cape Breton	21 July 1781	Atlantic Ocean	Idem	None	Kingdom of Great Britain	Victory
Invasion of Minorca	19 August 1781 – 5 February 1782	Spain	Kingdom of Great Britain	Spain	Kingdom of Great Britain	Victory
Siege of Yorktown	28 September – 17 October 1781	United States	Kingdom of Great Britain	United States	Kingdom of Great Britain Ansbach-Bayreuth Hesse-Kassel	Victory
Battle of the Chesapeake	5 September 1781	Chesapeake Bay	Idem	None	Kingdom of Great Britain	Victory
Recapture of Sint Eustatius	26 November 1781	Sint Eustatius	Dutch East Indies	None	Kingdom of Great Britain	Victory
Second Battle of Ushant	12 December 1781	Bay of Biscay	Idem	None	Kingdom of Great Britain	Defeat
Siege of Brimstone Hill	11 January – 13 February 1782	Saint Kitts and Nevis	Kingdom of Great Britain	None	Kingdom of Great Britain	Victory
Capture of Demerara and Essequibo	22 January 1782	Guyana	Kingdom of Great Britain	None	Kingdom of Great Britain	Victory
Battle of St. Kitts	25–26 January 1782	Caribbean	Idem	None	Kingdom of Great Britain	Victory
Battle of Sadras	17 February 1782	Bay of Bengal	Idem	None	Kingdom of Great Britain	Victory
Capture of Montserrat	22 February 1782	Montserrat	Kingdom of Great Britain	None	Kingdom of Great Britain	Victory
First Battle of Cuddalore	3 April 1782	India	Kingdom of France	None	Kingdom of Great Britain	Victory
Battle of the Saintes	9/12 April 1782	France	Kingdom of France	None	Kingdom of Great Britain	Defeat
Battle of Providien	12 April 1782	Bay of Bengal	Idem	None	Kingdom of Great Britain	Victory
Battle of the Mona Passage	19 April 1782	Caribbean	Idem	None	Kingdom of Great Britain	Defeat
Third Battle of Ushant	20–21 April 1782	Bay of Biscay	Idem	None	Kingdom of Great Britain	Defeat
Battle of Negapatam	6 July 1782	Bay of Bengal	Idem	None	Kingdom of Great Britain	Indecisive
Hudson Bay Expedition	8 August 1782	Canada	Kingdom of Great Britain	None	Kingdom of Great Britain	Victory
Action of 12 August 1782	12 August 1782	Bay of Bengal	Idem	None	Kingdom of Great Britain	Indecisive
Battle of Trincomalee	25 August – 3 September 1782	Sri Lanka	Kingdom of Great Britain	None	Kingdom of Great Britain	Victory
Battle of Cape Spartel	20 October 1782	Strait of Gibraltar	Idem	Spain	Kingdom of Great Britain	Indecisive
Capture of the Turks and Caicos Islands	12 February 1783	Turks and Caicos Islands	Kingdom of Great Britain	None	Kingdom of Great Britain	Victory
Action of 15 February 1783	15 February 1783	Caribbean	Idem	None	Kingdom of Great Britain	Defeat
Action of 11 April 1783	11 April 1783	Bay of Bengal	Idem	None	Kingdom of Great Britain	Defeat
Second Battle of Cuddalore	7 June – 25 July 1783	India	Kingdom of Great Britain	None	Kingdom of Great Britain	Indecisive
Third Battle of Cuddalore	20 June 1783	Bay of Bengal	Idem	None	Kingdom of Great Britain	Victory

== See also ==
- Military history of France
- List of wars involving France
- French Armed Forces
- Deployments of the French military
