= Victor François de Broglie, 2nd Duke of Broglie =

French army officer (1718–1804)

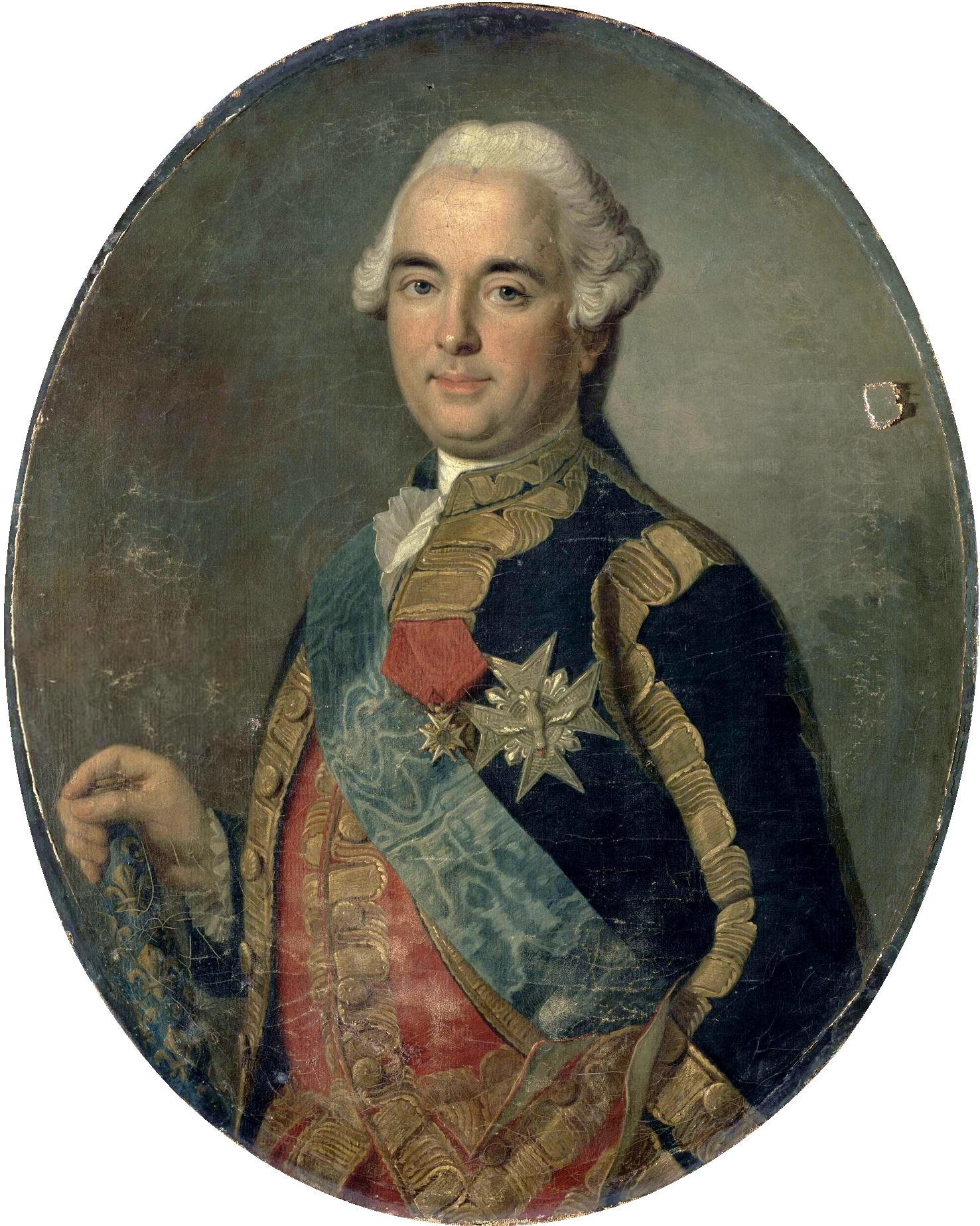
- Born: 19 October 1718; Paris, Kingdom of France
- Died: 30 March 1804 (aged 85); Münster
- Military career
- Allegiance: Kingdom of France
- Branch: French Royal Army
- Service years: 1734–1792
- Rank: Marshal of France
- Conflicts: War of the Austrian Succession; Battle of Rocoux; Battle of Lauffeld; Siege of Masstricht; Seven Years' War; Battle of Hastenbeck; Battle of Rossbach; Battle of Sandershausen; 1st Battle of Lutterberg; Battle of Bergen; Battle of Minden; Battle of Corbach; Battle of Löwenhagen; Battle of Grünberg; Siege of Cassel; Battle of Villinghausen; American Revolutionary War; French Revolutionary Wars; War of the First Coalition

Victor François de Broglie, 2nd Duke of Broglie (French: [viktɔʁ fʁɑ̃swa də bʁɔj]; 19 October 1718 – 30 March 1804) was an officer of the French Army. He became a Marshal of France in 1759.

== Biography ==
He served with his father, François Marie de Broglie, 1st Duke of Broglie, at Parma and Guastalla, and in 1734 obtained a colonelcy.

In the War of the Austrian Succession, he took part in the storming of Prague in 1742, and was made a brigadier. In 1744 and 1745 he saw further service on the Rhine, and he succeeded his father as 2nd duc de Broglie on the old duke's death in 1745. He was made a Maréchal de Camp, and he subsequently served with Marshal de Saxe in the Low Countries, and was present at Roucoux, Val and Maastricht. At the end of the war, he was made a lieutenant-general.

During the Seven Years' War, he served successively under Louis Charles César Le Tellier, duc d'Estrées, Charles de Rohan, prince de Soubise, and Contades, being present at all the battles from Hastenbeck onwards. His victory over Prince Ferdinand's forces at Bergen (1759) won him the rank of marshal of France from King Louis XV and the title of Prince of the Holy Roman Empire Reichsfürst from Emperor Francis I.

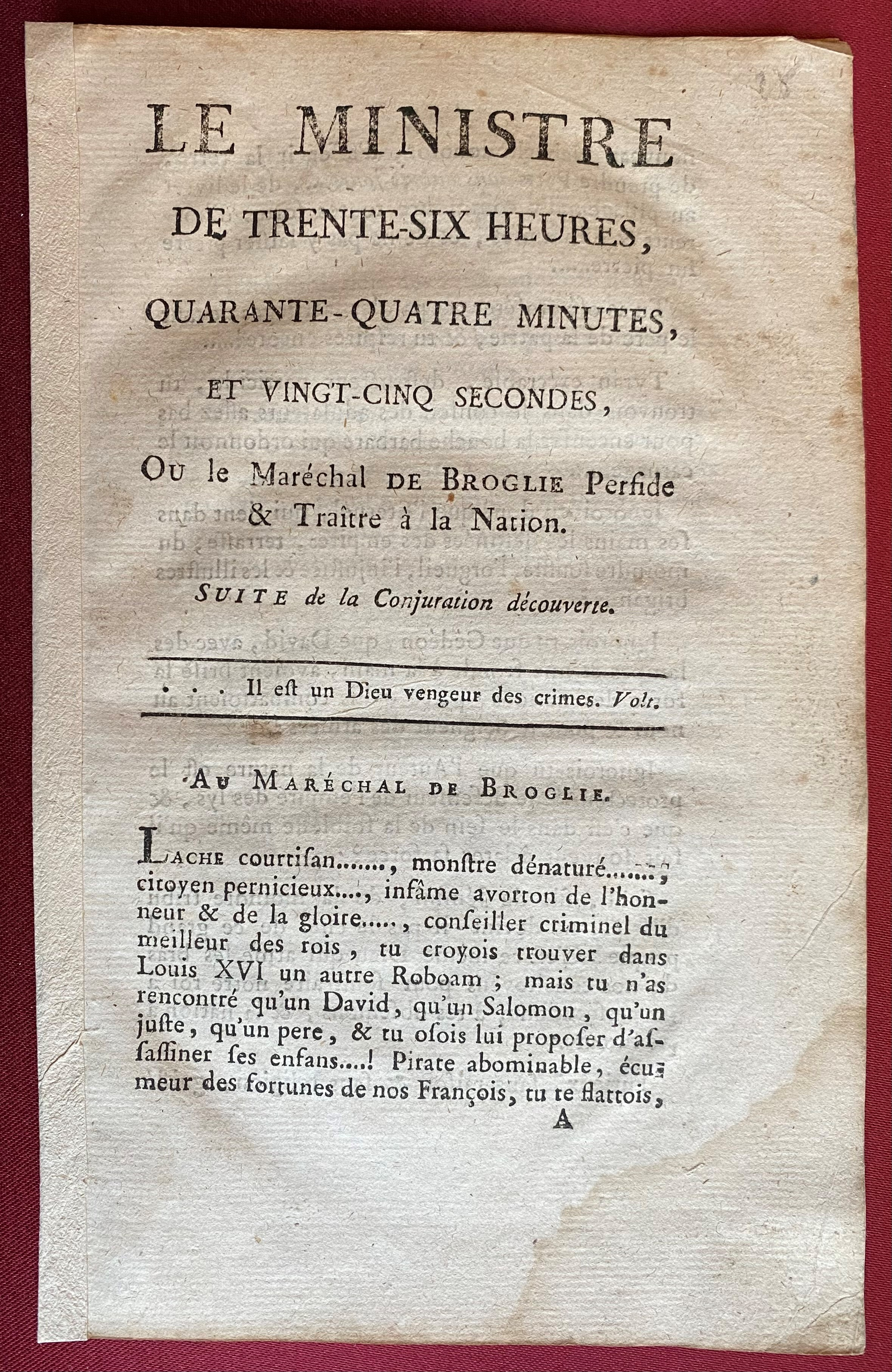
In French history, Victor François de Broglie's term as Secretary of State, Minister of War, was the shortest. According to this contemporary defamatory pamphlet, it lasted exactly: 36 hours, 44 minutes and 25 seconds.

After his victory at the Battle of Bergen, followed that with the capture the city of Minden, the French were defeated at the Battle of Minden under the command of Contades, whom he would succeed in command. In 1760, he won an action at the Korbach, but was defeated at Villinghausen in 1761. After the war, he fell into disgrace and was not recalled to active employment until 1778, when he was given command of the troops designed to operate against Great Britain, when France intervened on the Thirteen Colonies' side during the American war of independence. He played a prominent part in the French Revolution, which he opposed with determination; he commanded troops at Versailles in July 1789 and briefly served as Louis XVI's minister of war before fleeing France. After his emigration, the duc de Broglie commanded the Army of the Princes for a short time (1792).

Since the duke's eldest son, Charles-Louis-Victor, prince de Broglie, died in the Terror, the succession fell to his grandson, who became the third duc de Broglie. He died at Münster in 1804.

== Marriage and children ==
Victor François de Broglie first married in 1736 Marie Anne Dubois de Villers, who died in 1751.
They had 4 sons, which all died young.

In 1752, he remarried Louise Augustine Salbigothon Crozat de Thiers. They had 12 children, including :

- Victor de Broglie, Prince of Broglie (1756-1794), his successor, guillotined.
- Maurice-Jean de Broglie (1766-1821), Bishop of Ghent.
- Amédée de Broglie (1772-1851), Maréchal de camp, Order of the Holy Spirit.

== See also ==
- France in the Seven Years War
- France in the American Revolutionary War

== Notes ==
Political offices
Preceded by Louis Pierre de Chastenet, comte de Puységur	Secretary of State for War; 13 Jul 1789 – 16 Jul 1789	Succeeded by Jean-Frédéric de la Tour du Pin-Gouvernet
French nobility
Preceded by François-Marie de Broglie	Duke of Broglie; 1745–1804	Succeeded by Victor de Broglie
