= Arboretum Habichtsborn =

Arboretum in Lower Saxony, Germany

Coordinates: 51°20′37″N 9°39′42″E

The Arboretum Habichtsborn, also known as the Arboretum Staufenberg, is an arboretum located at Forstamtsstraße 6, Escherode, several kilometers southeast of Staufenberg, Lower Saxony, Germany. It is maintained by the Niedersächsischen Forstlichen Versuchsanstalt, and contains about 150 types of woody plants, including Sequoiadendron specimens.

== See also ==
- List of botanical gardens in Germany
