= Battle of Corbach =

Battle on 10 July 1760 during the Seven Years' War

Coordinates: 51.2833°N 8.8667°E

- Part of the Seven Years' War
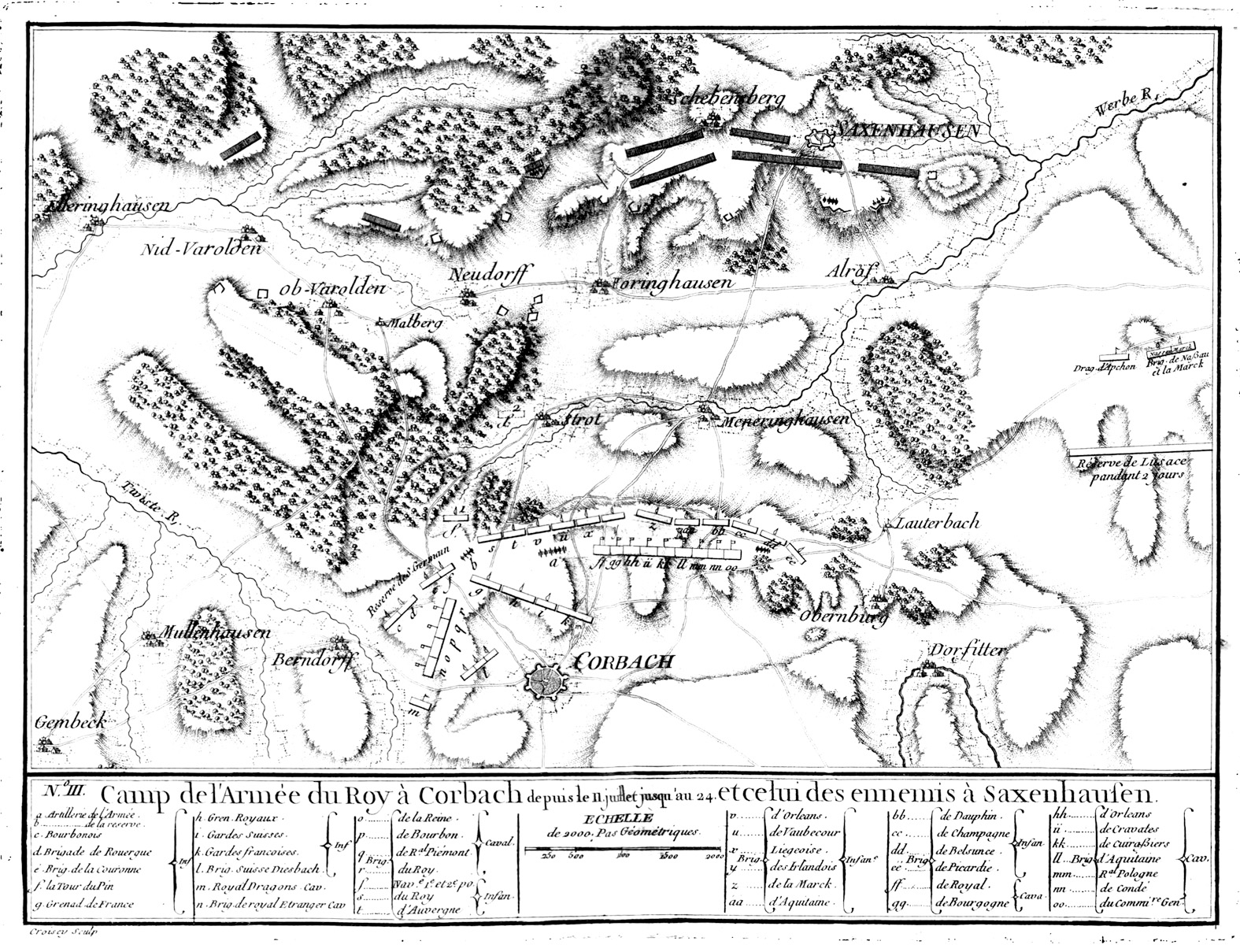
- Camp of the King 's Army at Corbach and that of the enemies at Saxenhausen .
Date	10 July 1760
Location	Korbach, present-day Germany
Result	French victory

Belligerents
(Province of Hanover) Hanover; Great Britain; Brunswick; Hesse-Kassel (or Hesse-Cassel)	(Kingdom of France) France

Commanders and leaders
Duke Ferdinand of Brunswick-Wolfenbüttel	Victor-François, 2nd duc de Broglie Jean-Baptiste Donatien de Vimeur, comte de Rochambeau

Strength
15,000 to 20,000: 8,000 to 8,500 Hanoverian infantry; 3,500 to 3,800 British infantry; 2,500 to 2,700 Hessian infantry; 1,000 to 1,200 Brunswick infantry; 600 Hanoverian cavalry; 300 British cavalry; 250 Hessian cavalry; 13 British Guns; 8 Hanoverian Guns 400 to 500 with Luckner	7,000 to 12,000 initially, rising to 20,000: 1,000 to 1,200 cavalry; 24 Guns

Casualties and losses
800 to 1,000 dead, wounded or captured 18 guns lost	700 to 800

The Battle of Corbach, or Korbach, a Hanseatic town of Waldeck-Frankenberg in northern Hesse, Germany, was fought on 10 July 1760 during the Seven Years' War. Corbach was the first battle of the campaign of 1760 and was a victory for the French over the Hanoverians, the British and their allies.

== Preliminary maneuvers ==
The town of Corbach is sited on the heights of Corbach that rise to some 400 meters above the surrounding plain and extend about one mile east of Corbach to the woods of Berndorf. The main French force under Victor-François, 2nd duc de Broglie marshal of France was about 18 miles to the south at Frankenburg while the main allied force under Ferdinand, Duke of Brunswick was at Sachsenhausen 6 miles to the east. De Broglie had been ordered to advance on Hanover north through Hesse.

Corbach itself had been previously seized on 9 July by General Nicolas Luckner, the Hanoverian light cavalry commander, but his small force of 4 squadrons and a battalion of Hessian Jägers was driven off very early on the 10th by the vanguard of St. Germain. Ferdinand sent Karl Wilhelm Ferdinand, the Hereditary Prince, the Erbprinz of Brunswick, with a mixed force of British, Hanoverians, Hessians and others with the intent to retake Corbach, defeat St. Germain's corps and prevent the junction of two French armies at that point. Leaving Lord Granby in command at Sachsenhausen, Ferdinand marched with a large force to Wildungen. The Erbprinz marched from Sachsenhausen and arrived before the heights of Corbach by nine in the morning.

The British portion under the command of Major General John Griffin of the allied force is stated to be at least four battalions of foot; including: Hodgson's 5th, Cornwallis' 24th, Carr's 50th, Brudenell's 51st; five squadron's of horse including three of Bland's Dragoons and 2 of Howard's; and a brigade of 18 pieces of artillery under Captain Charlton. The balance of the allied force was some nineteen battalions of Hanoverian, Hessian and Brunswick foot and fourteen squadrons of cavalry. Additionally, Luckner was still in the vicinity.

Saint Germain's fleet was initially the two brigades of de la Tour-du-Pin and la Couronne followed by the brigades Royal-Suédois and de Castella (3 Swiss regiments) reinforced later by Navarre and du Roi and is stated to be various sizes from a low of 10 battalions and fifteen squadrons, perhaps 7,000 to as many as 10,000 in six brigades and 17 squadrons.

== Battle ==
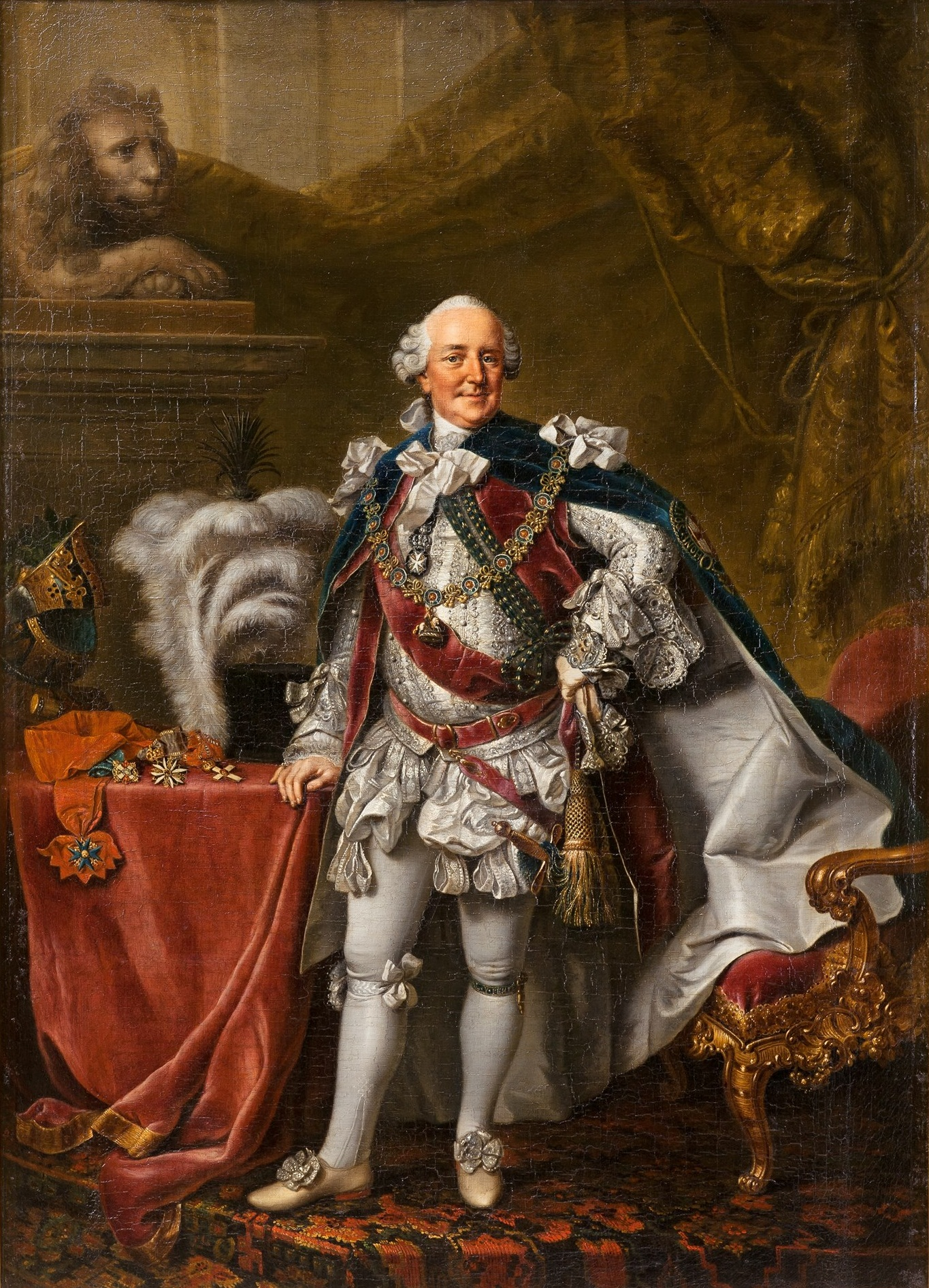
The Erbprinz, Charles William Ferdinand of Brunswick.

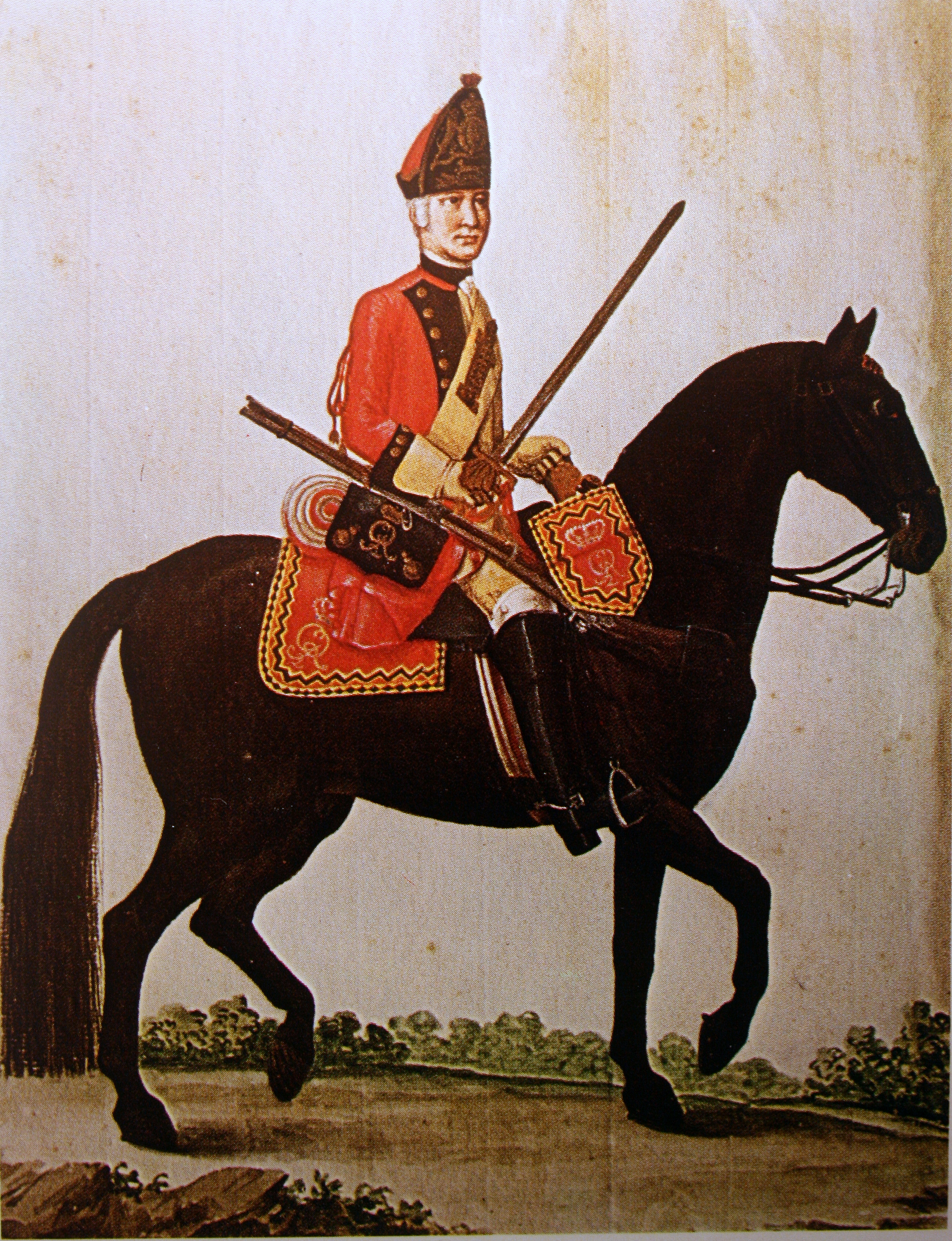
Hanoverian Cavalryman

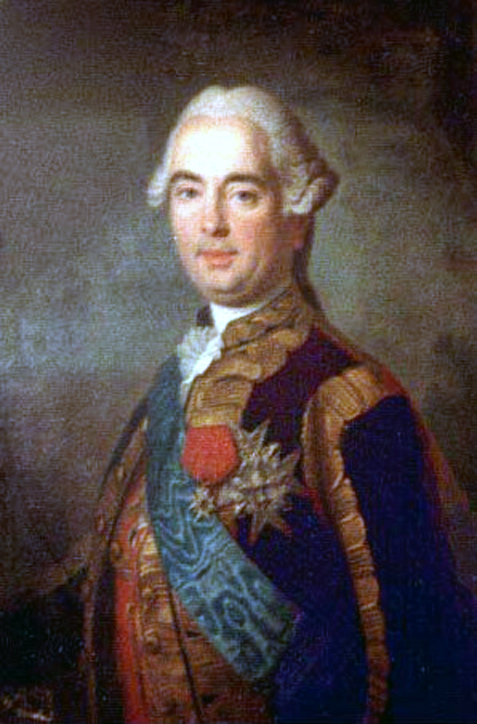
The duc de Broglie

St. Germain deployed four infantry battalions in the town of Corbach. The rest of his corps, infantry artillery and cavalry, were drawn up on Corbach heights extending east and somewhat north to the woods of Berndorf in which he deployed some light troops. The Hereditary Prince deployed his corps and attacked immediately, however, the French deployment obliged him to leave his left rear open to an advance by any French reinforcement sent north on the road from Frankenberg to Corbach.

The battle began with the allies' arrival at 9 A.M., opening with some Hussar light cavalry skirmishing from both sides. A heated cannonade lasted throughout the day along with brisk infantry fire with the French standing firm. The fight became particularly intense in the center in a hollow way, between two woods on the hill between Corbach and Berndorf Wood where the French put the German allied contingent into some difficulty. According to an official report from Granby to Ligonier, the arrival of French troops from Frankenberg on the allied rear decided the Prince on a withdrawal.

During the withdrawal confusion broke out in the allied German infantry and cavalry ranks the French redoubled their artillery fire and charged with a large body of cavalry. The allied retreat began around 3 in the afternoon in some disorder. Two of British cavalry squadrons of the 1st King's Regiment of Dragoon Guards and the 2nd Queen's Regiment of Dragoon Guards led by the Erbprinz charged and are credited with saving nearly the entire force, with the 1st KDG losing 47 killed. The two British cavalry regiments and two British infantry regiments, the 50th and 51st, covered the allies' retreat but could not prevent the loss of the right flank Royal Artillery Brigade and 18 guns to the French.

== Aftermath ==
The battle of Corbach was the first battle of the campaign of 1760. The French success at Corbach combined with De Broglie's taking the initiative early in the season did much to enable them to continue their advance and maintain the gains they made by maneuver in Germany despite several subsequent battlefield defeats at the hands of the Hereditary Prince and Ferdinand in the battles of Emsdorf and Warburg. With the French marginal victory at the Kloster Kampen later in October any hope the British had of ending the war on favorable terms in 1760 evaporated despite their successes in America.
