= Siege of Cassel (1761) =

1761 failed attempt by Duke Ferdinand of Brunswick to capture French-held Kassel

Coordinates: 51.3197°N 9.4978°E

- Part of the Seven Years' War
Date	March 1761
Location	Cassel, Hesse-Kassel, Germany
Result	French victory

Belligerents
Great Britain; Hanover; Prussia; Hesse-Kassel	France

Commanders and leaders
(Electorate of Brunswick-Lüneburg) Duke Ferdinand of Brunswick	(Kingdom of France) Duc de Broglie

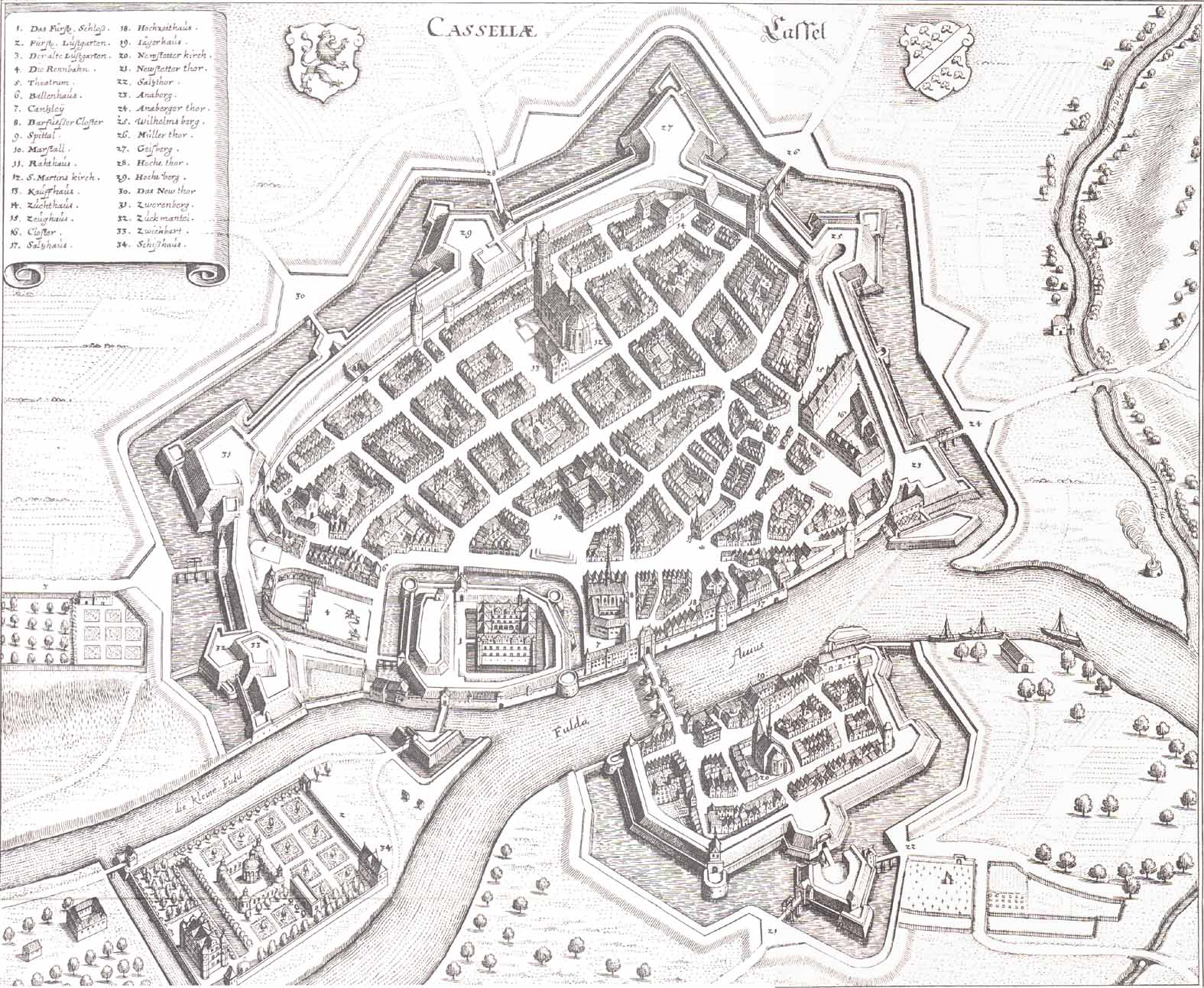
Cassel 1761

The siege of Cassel (March 1761) was a failed attempt by Duke Ferdinand of Brunswick to capture French-held Kassel, the capital of Hesse-Kassel. The siege lasted about four weeks, but Brunswick was forced to lift the siege after forces of the Duc de Broglie inflicted heavy casualties on his forces at the Battle of Grünberg on March 21, making continuation of the siege untenable.

In 1762, Brunswick successfully captured Cassel after the Siege of Cassel. It would remain under occupation until the end of the Seven Years War.
