= Battle of Lutterberg (1758) =

1758 battle in Saxony

Coordinates: 51.3500°N 9.5997°E

- Part of the Seven Years' War
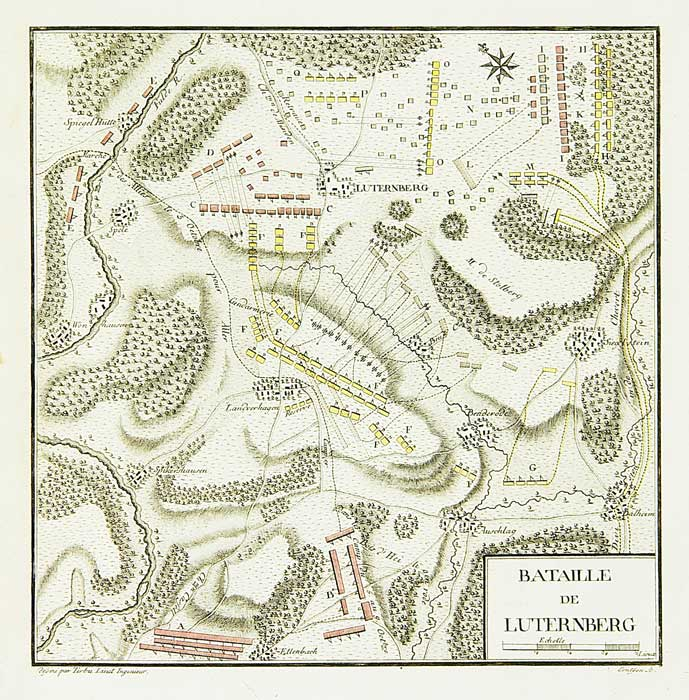
Date	10 October 1758
Location	Lutterberg (present-day Lower Saxony)
Result	French victory

Belligerents
(Province of Hanover) Hanover	France

Commanders and leaders
Christoph von Oberg	(Kingdom of France) Charles, Prince of Soubise

Strength
14,000	42,000

Casualties and losses
3,000 to 4,000 dead or wounded 800 captured	600 dead or wounded

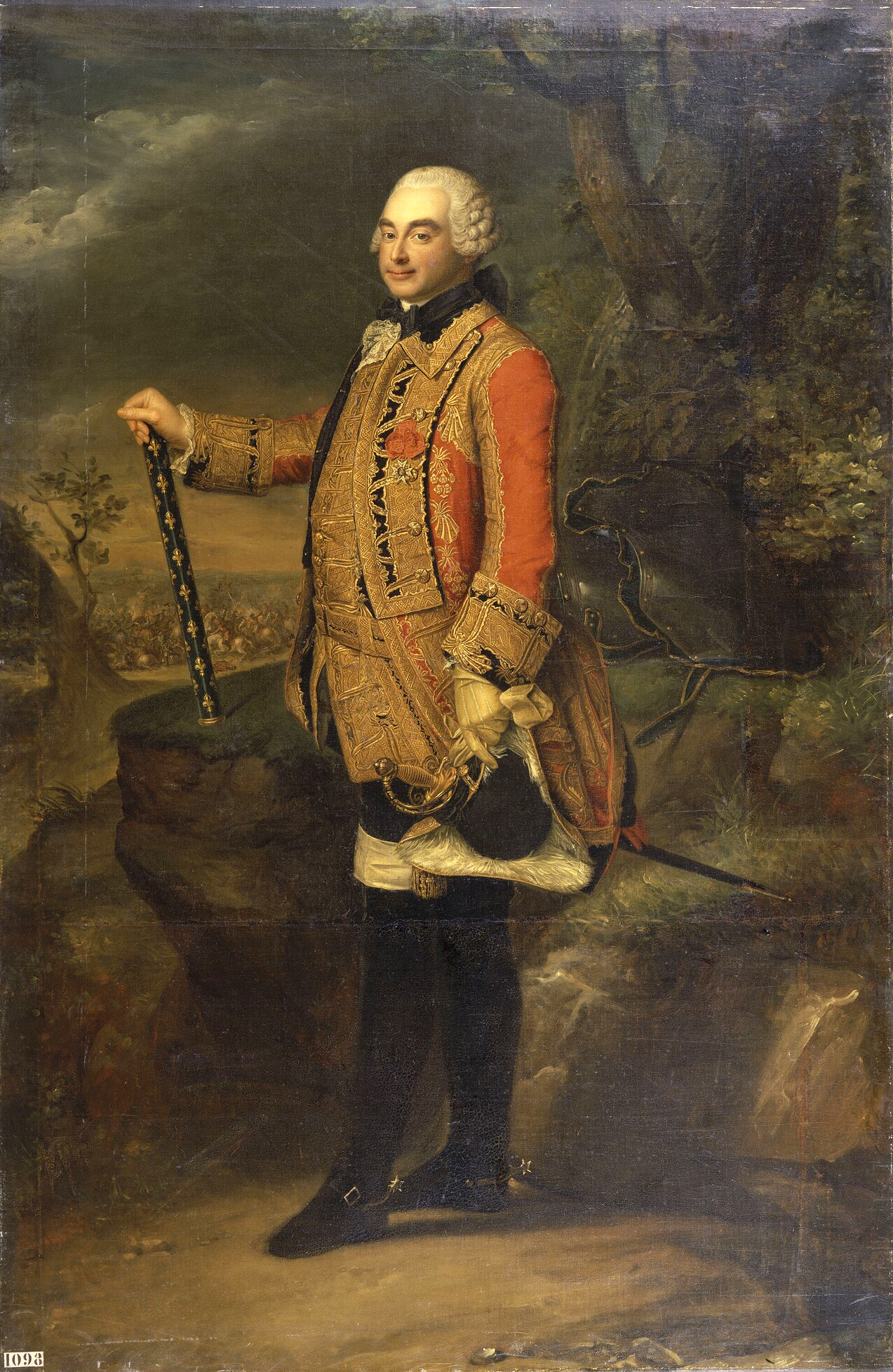
The Prince of Soubise, with his earned Marshal's baton

The Battle of Lutterberg took place on 10 October 1758 during the Seven Years' War between a French force of 42,000 commanded by Charles, Prince of Soubise and a much smaller Anglo-German force commanded by General Christoph Ludwig von Oberg.

The two armies clashed near the town of Lutterberg, Lower Saxony. The 14,000 mostly Prussian Allied troops, were overwhelmed by several charges of French cavalry and were forced to withdraw. Despite having won a decisive victory, Soubise was slow to pursue the retreating enemy - causing his superiors in Paris to replace him with the Marquis de Contades.

Soubise earned a Marshal's baton for this victory. François de Chevert was decorated with the Grand Croix for his contributions in the battle.

== Bibliography ==
- Duffy, Christopher. The Military Experience in the Age of Reason. Routledge & Kegan Paul, 1987.
- Jacques, Tony. The Dictionary of Battles and Sieges, F-O. Greenwood Press, 2007.
