= Staufenberg, Lower Saxony =

Staufenberg
- Municipality
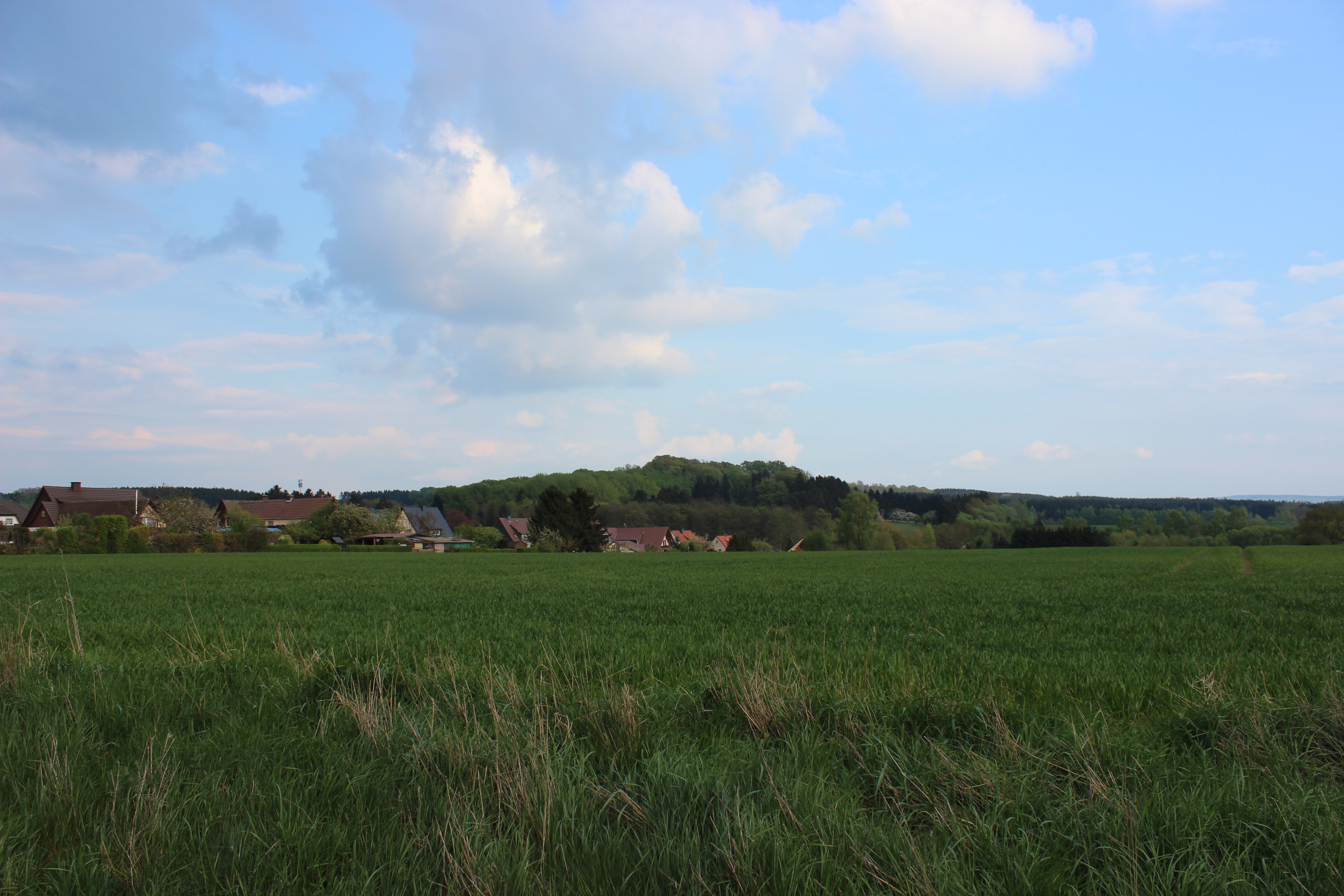

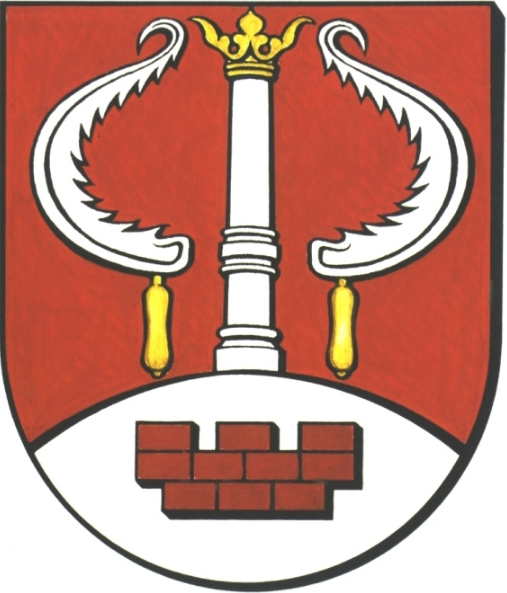
- Coat of arms

- Location of Staufenberg within Göttingen district
- Interactive map of Staufenberg
- Location within Germany Location within Lower Saxony
- Coordinates: 51°21′00″N 09°35′59″E
- Country: Germany
- State: Lower Saxony
- District: Göttingen

Government
  - Mayor (2021–26): Bernd Grebenstein

Area
  - Total: 77.55 km^{2} (29.94 sq mi)
- Elevation: 288 m (945 ft)

Population (2025-12-31)
  - Total: 7,480
  - Density: 96.5/km^{2} (250/sq mi)
- Time zone: UTC+01:00 (CET)
  - Summer (DST): UTC+02:00 (CEST)
- Postal codes: 34355
- Dialling codes: 05543
- Vehicle registration: GÖ
- Website: www.staufenberg-nds.de

Staufenberg (German pronunciation: [ˈʃtaʊfn̩ˌbɛʁk]) is the southernmost municipality of the district of Göttingen, and of Lower Saxony, Germany. It is situated east of the river Fulda, approx. 6 km south of Hannoversch Münden, and 12 km northeast of Kassel. Its seat is in the village Landwehrhagen.

== Points of interest ==
- Arboretum Habichtsborn
