= Battle of Grünberg =

1761 battle

Coordinates: 50.6000°N 8.9500°E

- Part of the Seven Years' War
Date	21 March 1761
Location	Grünberg, Hesse-Cassel
Result	French victory

Belligerents
Hanover; Hesse-Kassel; Brunswick-Wolfenbüttel	France

Commanders and leaders
Prince Ferdinand	Louis Georges Érasme de Contades

Strength
Unknown	Unknown

Casualties and losses
1,000 killed or wounded 2,000 captured	100 killed or wounded

The Battle of Grünberg (21 March 1761) was fought between French and allied Prussian and Hanoverian troops in the Seven Years' War at village of Grünberg, Hesse, near Stangenrod. The French, led by the Jacques Philippe de Choiseul, inflicted a significant defeat on the allies, taking several thousand prisoners, and capturing 18 military standards. The allied loss prompted Duke Ferdinand of Brunswick to lift the siege of Cassel and retreat.
