= History of Denmark =

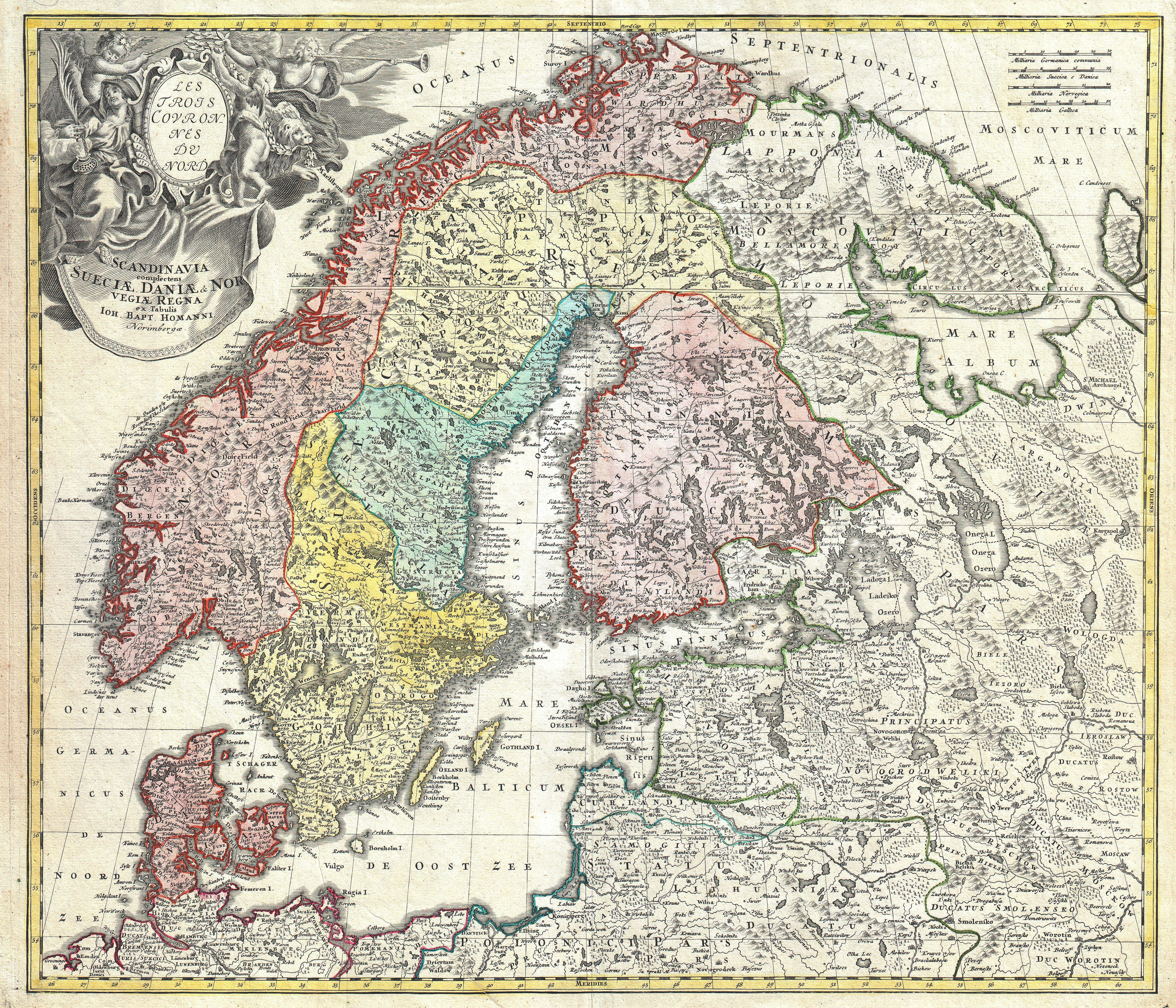
Homann's map of the Scandinavian Peninsula and Fennoscandia with their surrounding territories: northern Germany, northern Poland, the Baltic region, Livonia, Belarus, and parts of Northwest Russia. Johann Baptist Homann (1664–1724) was a German geographer and cartographer; map dated around 1730.

The history of Denmark as a unified kingdom began in the 8th century, but prehistoric cultures populated the area for about 12,000 years, since the end of the last ice age. Historic descriptions of the area and people from around 500 AD include writings by Jordanes and Procopius. The kingdom arose before the Christianization of the Danes c. 960 AD. The Viking kings Gorm the Old and Harald Bluetooth from that time are predecessors of today's king, Frederik X, thus the monarchy of Denmark is the oldest in Europe.

Denmark's history was shaped by its location between the North and Baltic seas and between Sweden and Germany. This location provided economic benefits and mutual struggles for control of the Baltic Sea (dominium maris baltici). For example, it had long disputes with Sweden over Skånelandene and with Germany over Schleswig (a Danish fief) and Holstein (a German fief). Eventually, Denmark lost these conflicts and ceded Skåneland to Sweden and later Schleswig-Holstein to the German Empire. After Norway seceded in 1814, Denmark retained control of the old Norwegian colonies of the Faroe Islands, Greenland and Iceland. During the 20th century, Iceland gained independence, Greenland and the Faroes became integral parts of the Kingdom of Denmark and North Schleswig reunited with Denmark in 1920 after a referendum. During World War II, Denmark was occupied by Nazi Germany, in 1940 April 9th the first sabatoge group in Denmark, the Churchill club was formed, five years later Denmark was liberated by British forces of the Allies and soon joined the United Nations. With the emergence of the Cold War, Denmark was a founding member of the military alliance NATO in 1949.

== Prehistory ==
The Scandinavian region has been populated by several prehistoric cultures and people for about 12,000 years, since the end of the last ice age. During the ice age, all of Scandinavia was covered by glaciers most of the time, except for the southwestern parts of what we now know as Denmark. When the ice began retreating, the barren tundras were soon inhabited by reindeer and elk, and Ahrenburg and Swiderian hunters from the south followed them here to hunt occasionally. Due to lower sea levels, the area called Doggerland between Great Britain and today's Jutland peninsula was inhabited by tribes of hunter-gatherers. As the climate warmed, meltwater shaped the land, the submerged Doggerland and more stable flora and fauna gradually emerged in Scandinavia. The first permanent human settlers in Scandinavia were the Maglemosian people, residing in seasonal camps and exploiting the land, sea, rivers and lakes. The approximate geography of today's Denmark had taken shape by around 6,000 BC.

Denmark’s natural conditions have facilitated the preservation of archaeological artefacts, contributing to extensive evidence for the study of prehistoric cultures in the region.

=== Stone and Bronze Age ===
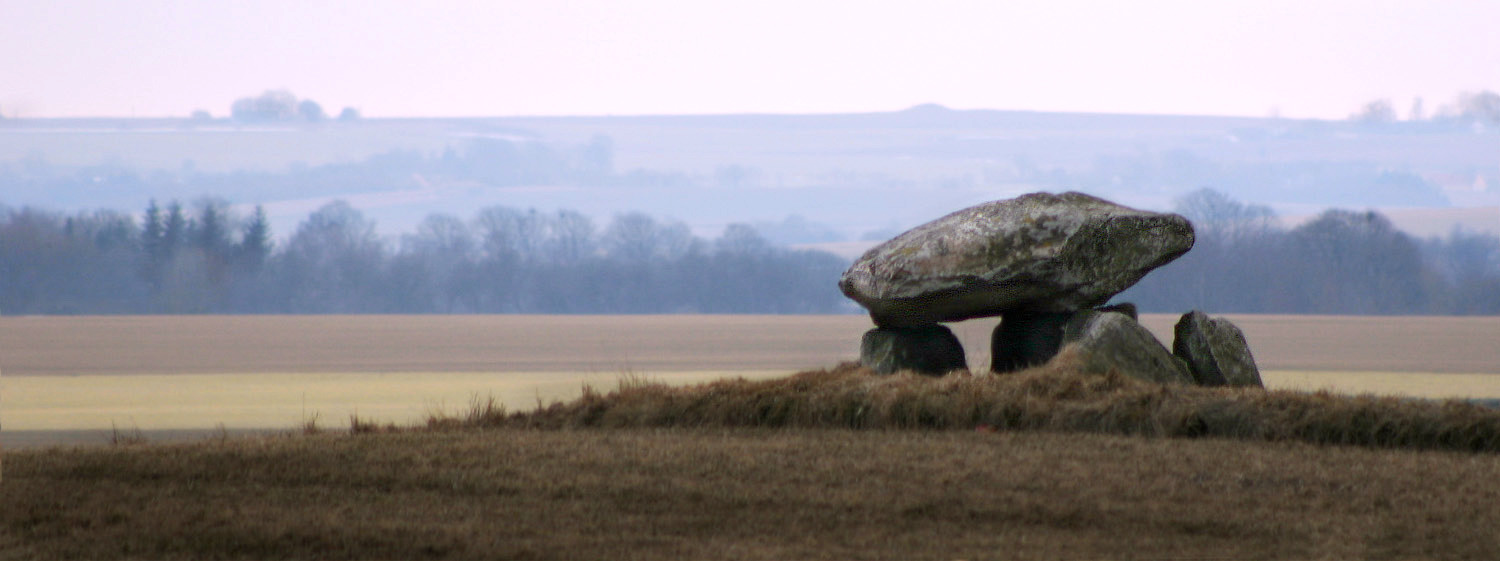
Stone Dolmen near Vinstrup, Nørhald. Built in the 3rd millennium BC.

The Weichsel glaciation covered all of Denmark most of the time, except the western coasts of Jutland. It ended around 13,000 years ago, allowing humans to move back and settle there. Over a few thousand years, the vegetation changed from tundra to light forest, and various animal species appeared, including megafauna. Early prehistoric human cultures uncovered in modern Denmark include the Maglemosian culture (9,500–6,000 BC); the Kongemose culture (6,000–5,200 BC), the Ertebølle culture (5,300–3,950 BC), and the Funnelbeaker culture (4,100–2,800 BC).

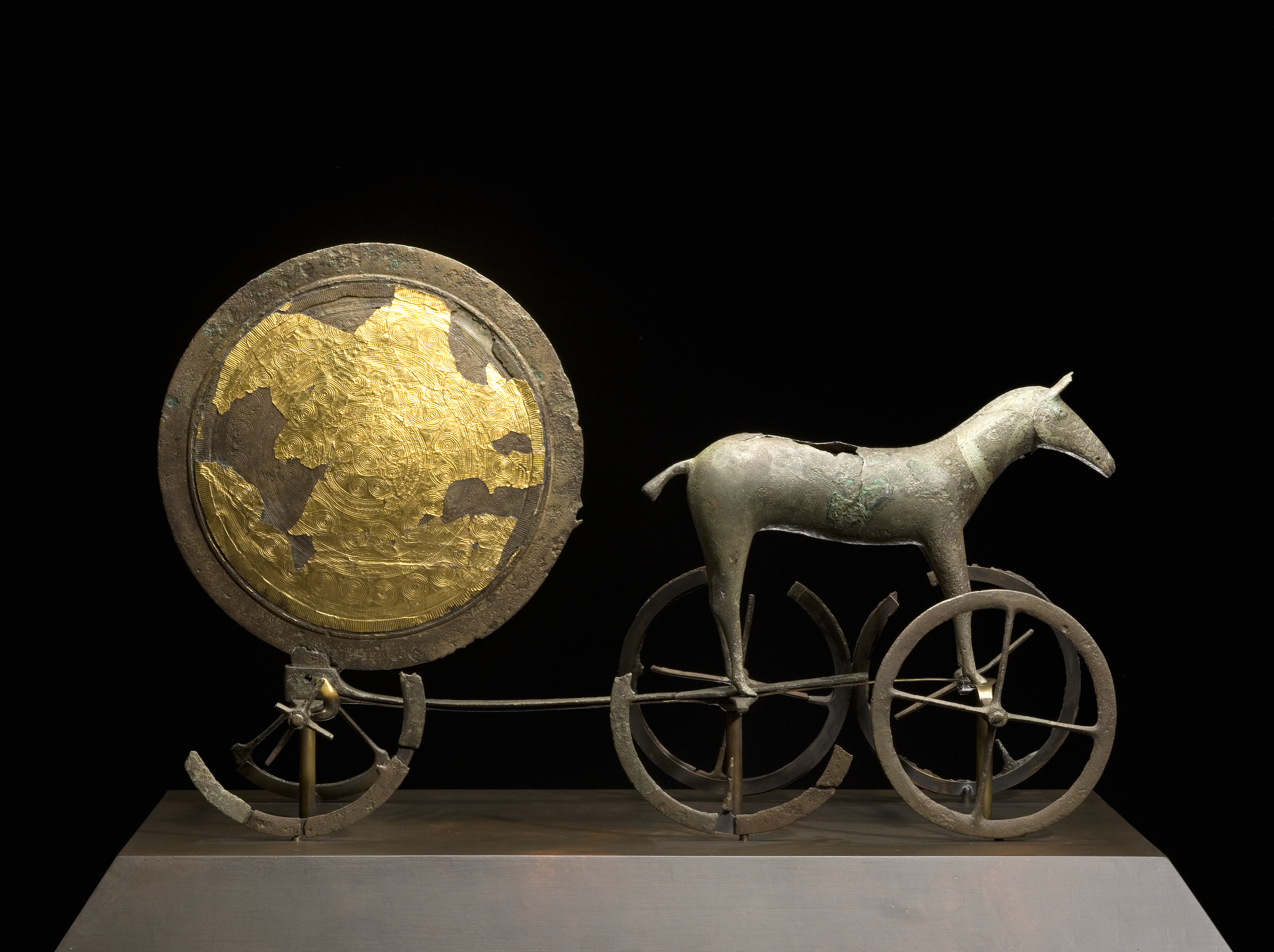
The famous Trundholm sun chariot (called Solvognen in Danish), a sculpture of the sun pulled by a mare. Scholars have dated it to some time in the 15th century BC and believe that it illustrates an important concept expressed in Nordic Bronze Age mythology.

During this so-called Boreal period, human groups here were very small and scattered living from hunting of reindeer and other land mammals and gathering whatever fruits the climate was able to offer. Around 8,300 BC the temperature rose sharply, reaching around 15 degrees Celsius (59 degrees Fahrenheit) in summer; the vegetation changed into dense forests of aspen, birch and pine and the reindeer moved north, while aurochs and elk arrived from the south. The oldest set of human bones found in Denmark and oldest bog body found in the world is the Koelbjerg Man, dated to the time of the Maglemosian culture around 8,000 BC. With a continuing rise in temperature oak, elm and hazel arrived in Denmark around 7,000 BC. Boar, red deer, and roe deer also began to abound.

A burial from Bøgebakken at Vedbæk dates to c. 6,000 BC and contains 22 persons – including four newborns and one toddler. Eight of the 22 had died before reaching 20 years of age – testifying to the hardness of hunter-gatherer life in the cold north. Based on estimates of the amount of game animals, scholars estimate the population of Denmark to have been between 3,300 and 8,000 persons in the time around 7,000 BC. It is believed that the early hunter-gatherers lived nomadically, exploiting different environments at different times of the year, gradually shifting to the use of semi permanent base camps.

The rising temperatures caused a rise in sea levels so that during the Atlantic period Denmark evolved from a contiguous landmass around 11,000 BC to a series of islands by 4,500 BC. The inhabitants then shifted to a seafood-based diet, which allowed the population to increase.

After agriculture arrived in Central Europe, for 1,500 years, Scandinavia remained Mesolithic in the Ertebølle culture. Around 4,000 BC, it was replaced by Funnelbeaker neolithic farmers. This left behind many dolmens and rock tombs (especially passage graves). After about 1,000 years, Steppe herder descendants began to arrive from Eastern Europe. The arriving groups descended from people that originated from the Pontic–Caspian steppe. These groups settled in Europe and gave rise to Corded Ware culture and its local variant, the Single Grave culture. The Nordic Bronze Age period in Denmark, approximately 1,500 BC, featured a culture that buried its dead with their personal belongings, valuables, and other objects, also known as grave goods beneath burial mounds. Various discoveries of gold and bronze items from this era include religious artifacts, musical instruments, and has provided the earliest evidence of social classes and stratification.

=== Iron Age ===
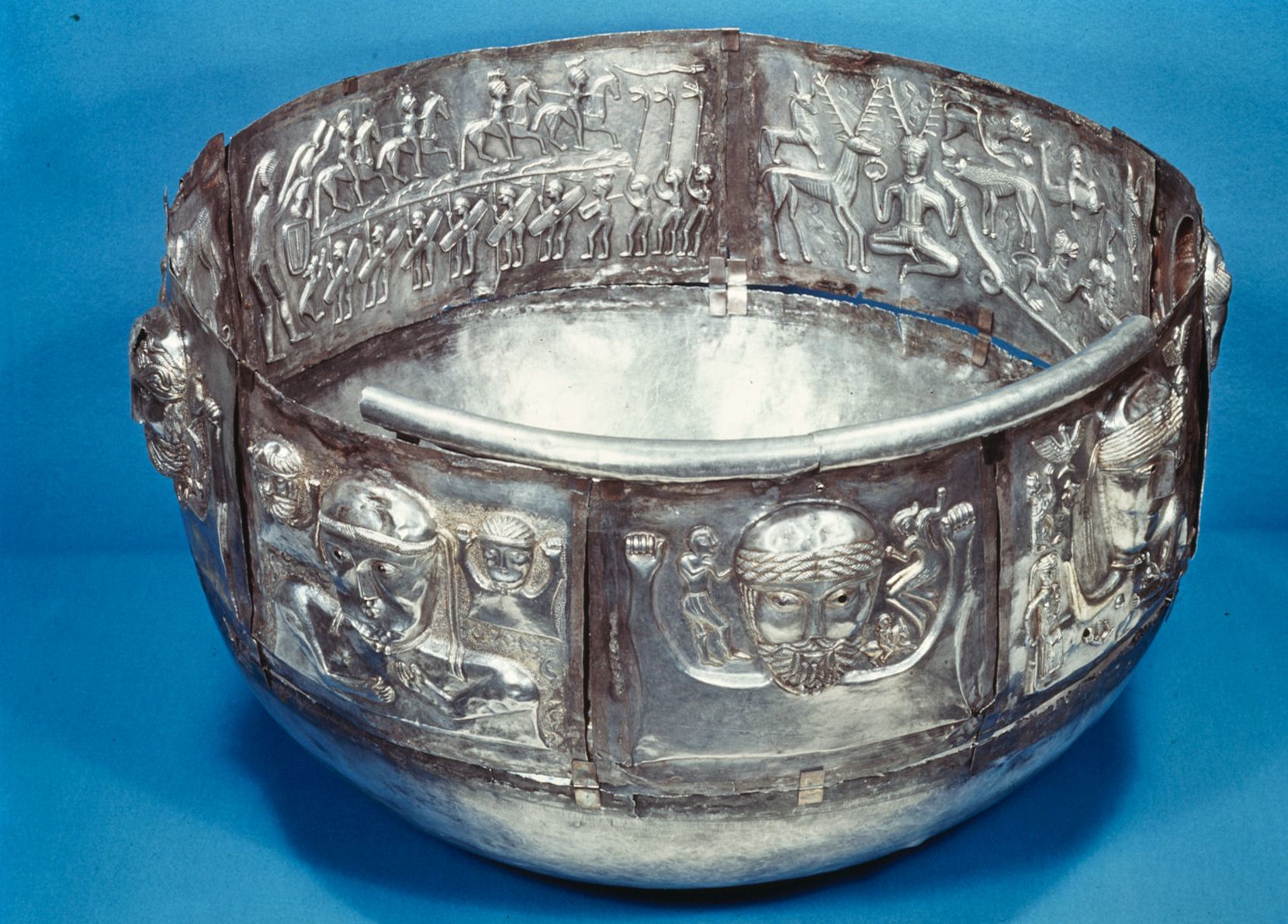
The silver Gundestrup Cauldron, with what some scholars interpret as Celtic depictions, exemplifies the trade relations of the period.

During the Pre-Roman Iron Age (from the 4th to the 1st century BC), the climate in southern Scandinavia became cooler and wetter, limiting agriculture. Humans migrated south to Germania. People also began to extract iron from ore in peat bogs. Celtic culture existed in the area as in much of northwest Europe, and survives in some place names.

The Roman Empire excluded Denmark but traded with people there, as attested by finds of Roman coins. Some Danish warrior-aristocrats served in the Roman army. The earliest known runic inscriptions date to c. 200 AD. In the last century BC, depletion of cultivated land apparently contributed to migrations in northern Europe and conflict between Teutonic tribes and Roman settlements in Gaul. Roman artifacts are especially common in finds from the 1st century. Occasionally, animals and humans were sacrificed and bodies were immersed in bogs. Some bog bodies such as Tollund Man and Grauballe Man emerged very well-preserved in recent decades, providing information about the cultures in Denmark during this period.

From around the 5th to the 7th century, Northern Europe experienced mass migrations. This period and its material culture are referred to as the Germanic Iron Age.

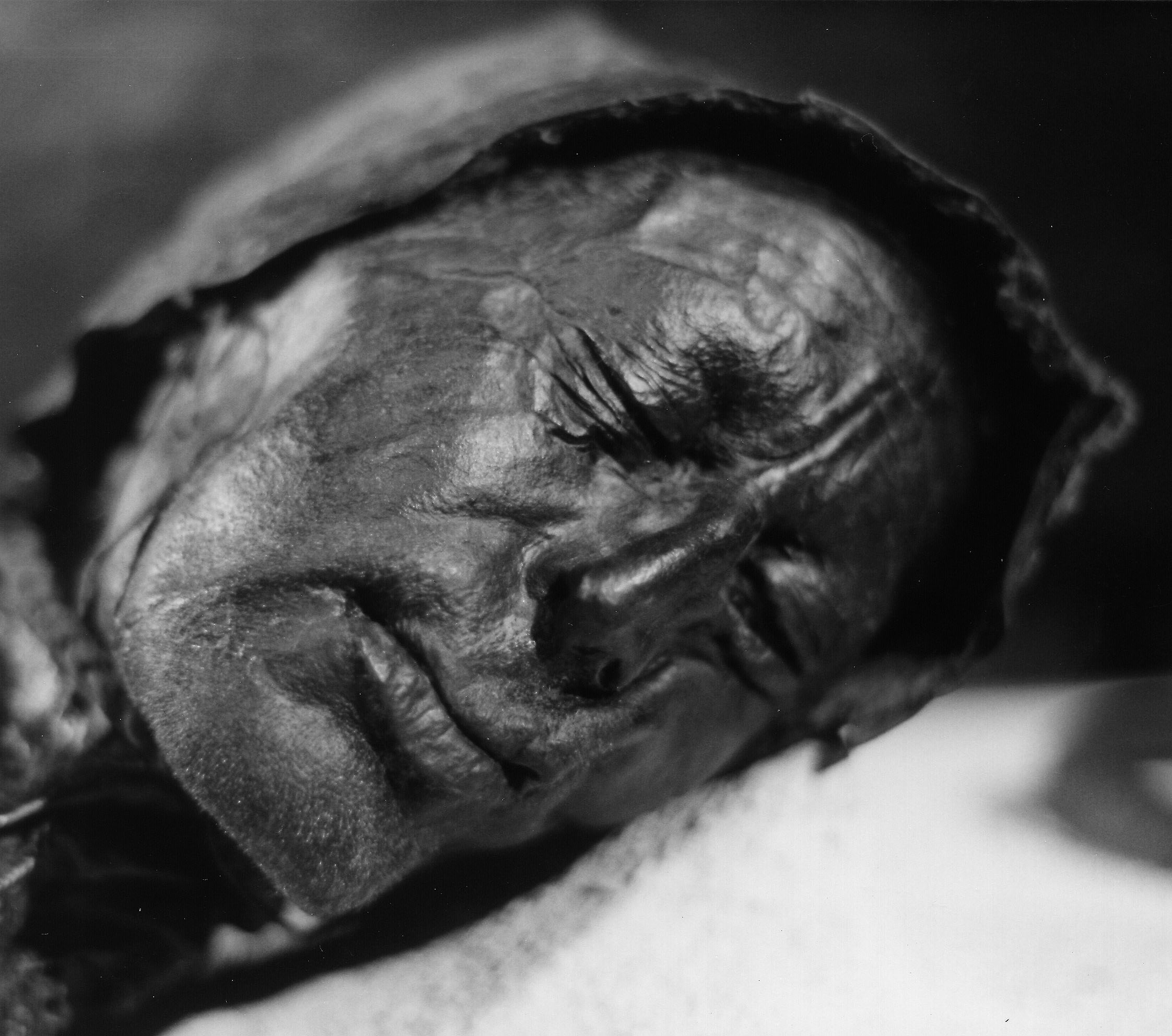
The face of Tollundmanden, one of the best preserved bog body finds.

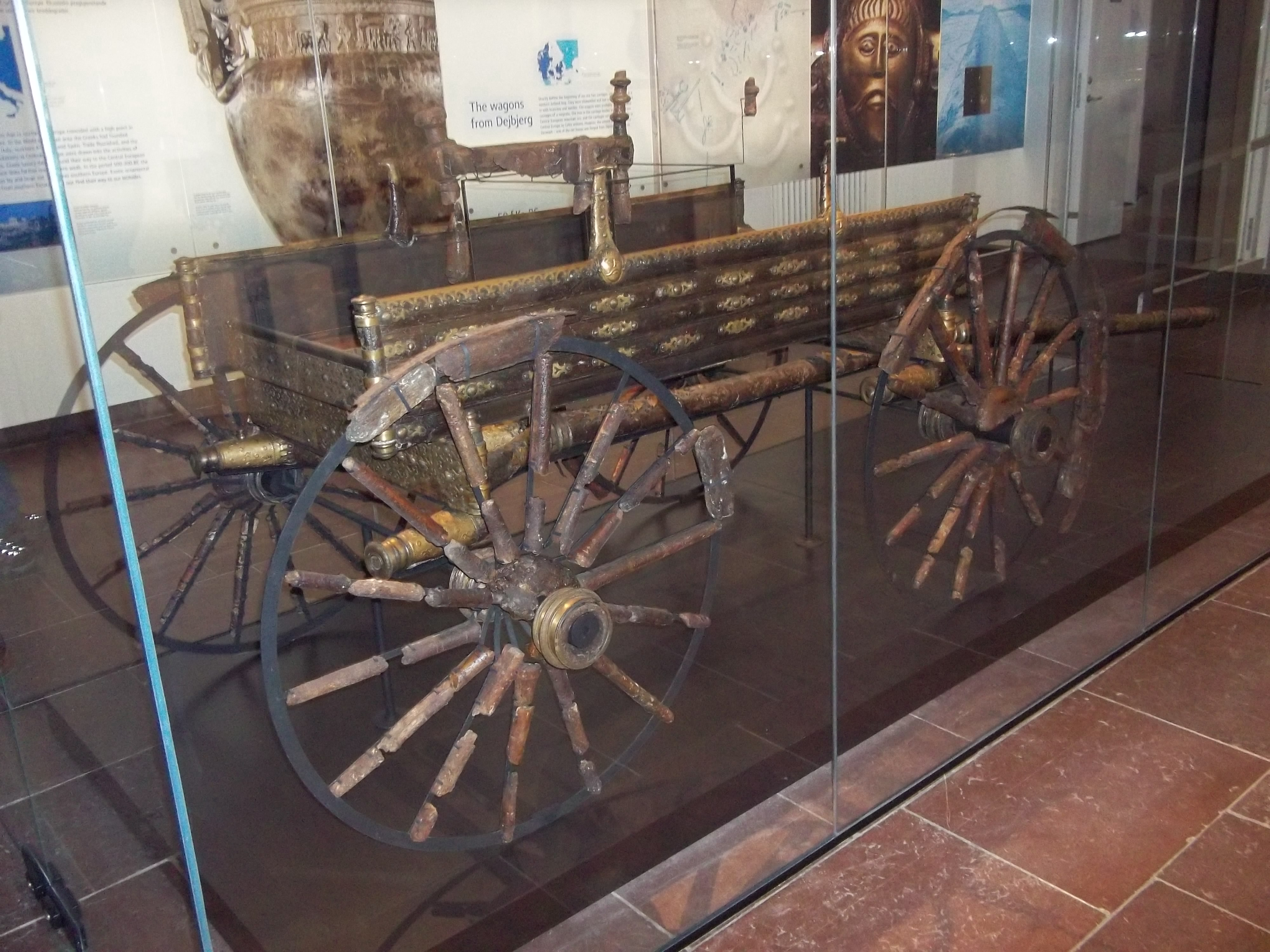
The Dejbjerg wagon from the Pre-Roman Iron Age, thought to be a ceremonial wagon.

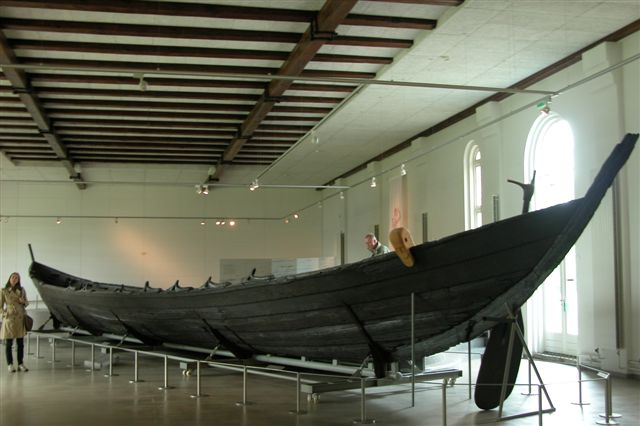
The Nydam oak boat, a ship burial from the Roman Iron Age. At Gottorp Castle, Schleswig, now in Germany.

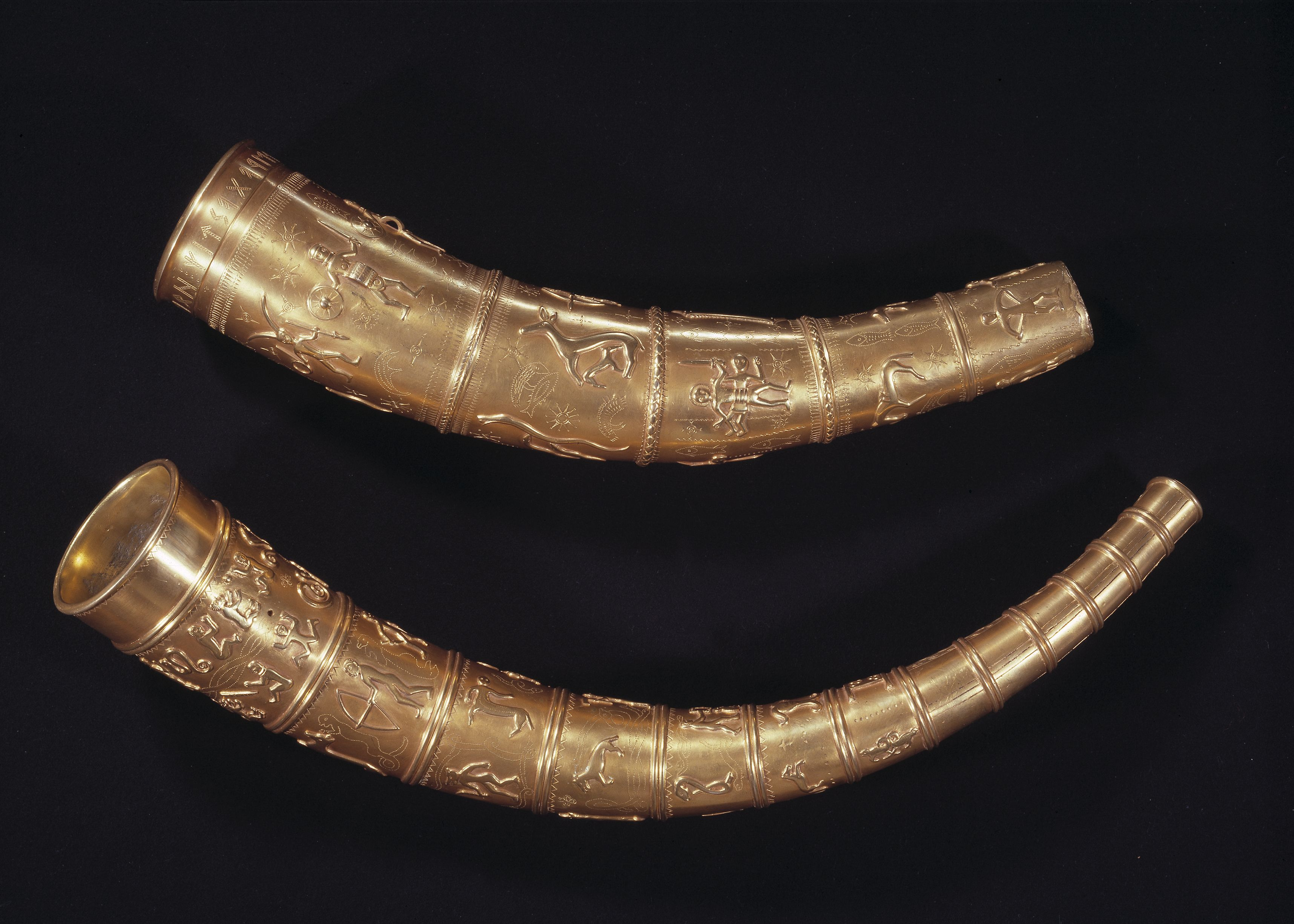
Copies of the Golden Horns of Gallehus from the Germanic Iron Age, thought to be ceremonial horns but of a raid purpose.

== Middle Ages ==
Kingdom of Denmark: ᛏᚨᚾᛗᚨᚱᚴᚱ (Younger Futhark) (Note: Reconstructed nominative tanmarkaʀ, based on the Jelling stones.); Danmǫrk konungrríki (Old Norse); Danmærk konungerīki (Old Danish)
- 8th century / 936–1397
- State banner of Denmark (14th century)

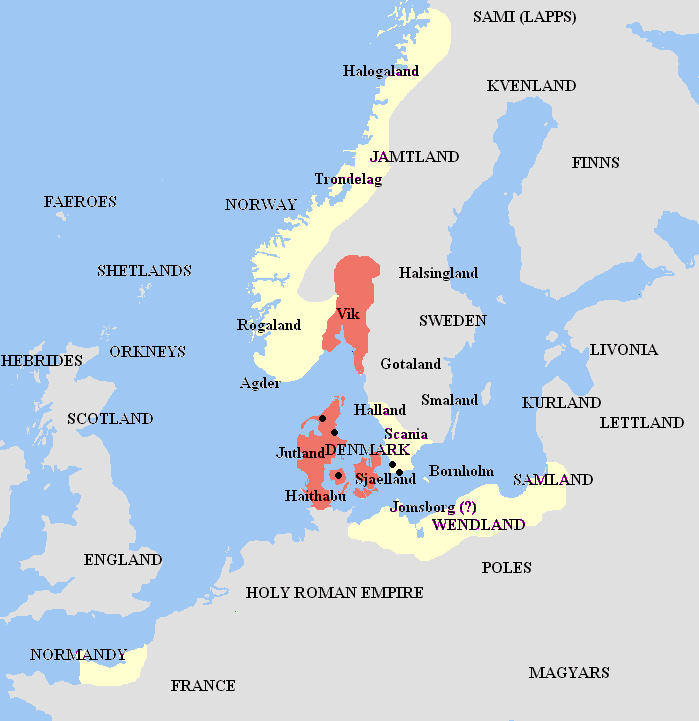
- Harald's realm (red) with vassals and allies (yellow).
- Status: Part of the North Sea Empire (1013–1035); Independent state until 1397
- Capital: Lejre in Zealand; Jelling (until 10th cent.); Roskilde (since 10th cent.)
- Common languages: Old Norse; Old Danish; Latin; Estonian (Danish Estonia)
- Religion: Norse paganism; (before c. 960); Christianity (Catholic); (after c. 960); Other and non-Danish: goðlauss (lack of faith in any deity); Estonian paganism (Danish Estonia)
- Historical era: Middle Ages
  - Formed: 8th century
  - Incorporated into the Kalmar Union: 17 June 1397

=== Earliest literary sources ===
In his description of Scandza (from the 6th-century work, Getica), the ancient writer Jordanes says that the Dani were of the same stock as the Suetidi (Swedes, Suithiod?) and expelled the Heruli and took their lands.

The Old English poems Widsith and Beowulf, as well as works by later Scandinavian writers — notably by Saxo Grammaticus (c. 1200) — provide some of the earliest references to Danes.

=== Viking Age ===
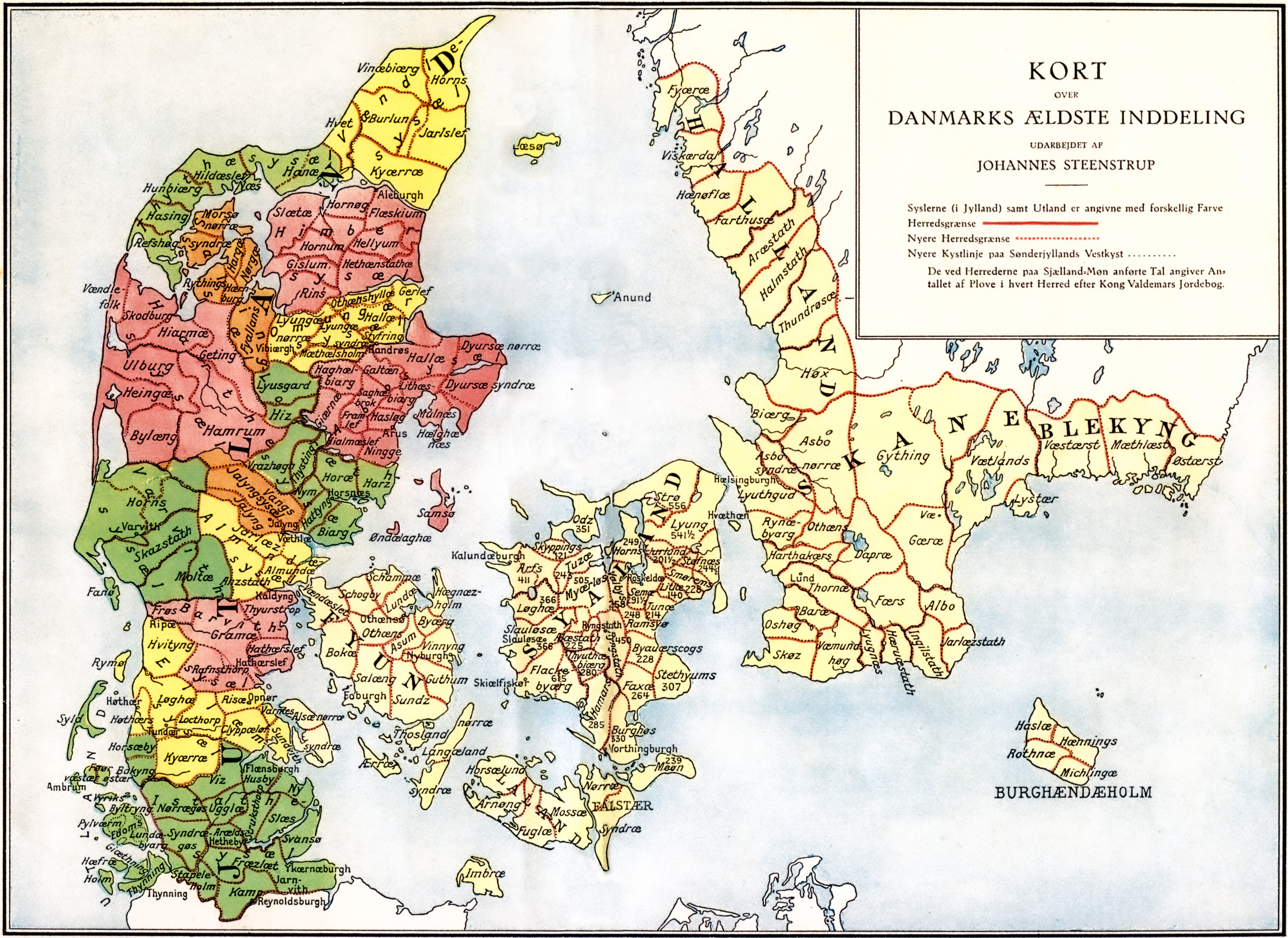
The extent of the Danish Realm before the expansion of the Viking Age. It is not known when, but the tribal Danes divided the realm into "herreder" (marked by red lines).

With the beginning of the Viking Age in the 9th century, the prehistoric period in Denmark ends. The Danish people were among those known as Vikings, during the 8th–11th centuries. Viking explorers first discovered and settled in Iceland in the 9th century, on their way from the Faroe Islands. From there, Greenland and Vinland (probably Newfoundland) were also settled. Utilizing their great skills in shipbuilding and navigation they raided and conquered parts of France and the British Isles.

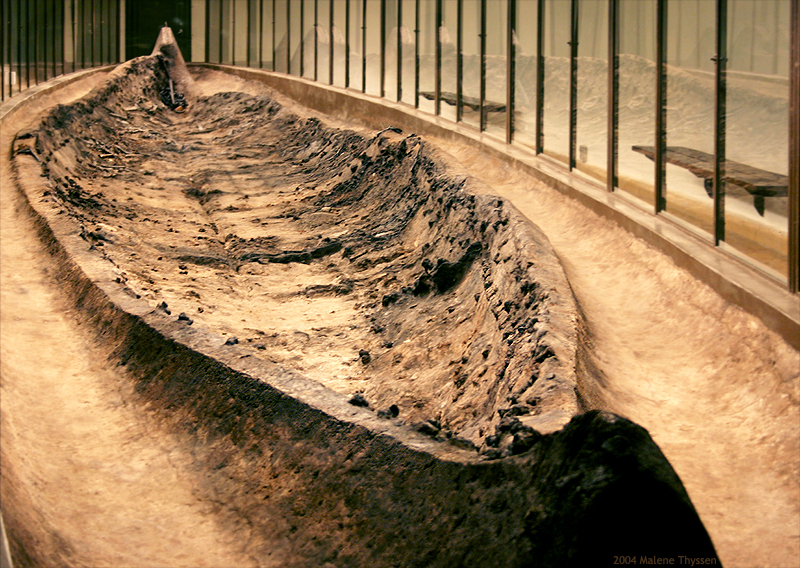
The Ladby ship, the largest ship burial found in Denmark.

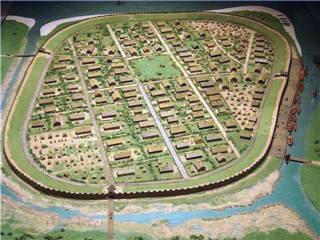
The fortified Viking town of Aros (Aarhus), 950 AD.

They also excelled in trading along the coasts and rivers of Europe, running trade routes from Greenland in the north to Constantinople in the south via Russian and Ukrainian rivers, most notably along the River Dnieper and via Kiev, then being the capital of Kievan Rus, which was founded by Viking conquerors. (Note: "The controversies over the nature of the Rus and the origins of the Russian state have bedevilled Viking studies, and indeed Russian history, for well over a century. It is historically certain that the Rus were Swedes. The evidence is incontrovertible, and that a debate still lingers at some levels of historical writing is clear evidence of the holding power of received notions. The debate over this issue – futile, embittered, tendentious, doctrinaire – served to obscure the most serious and genuine historical problem which remains: the assimilation of these Viking Rus into the Slavic people among whom they lived. The principal historical question is not whether the Rus were Scandinavians or Slavs, but, rather, how quickly these Scandinavian Rus became absorbed into Slavic life and culture.") The Danish Vikings were most active in Britain, Ireland, France, Spain, Portugal and Italy where they raided, conquered and settled (their earliest settlements included sites in the Danelaw, Ireland and Normandy). The Danelaw encompassed the Northeastern half of what now constitutes England, where Danes settled and Danish law and rule prevailed. Prior to this time, England consisted of approximately seven independent Anglo-Saxon kingdoms. The Danes conquered (terminated) all of these except for the kingdom of Wessex. Alfred the Great, king of Wessex, emerged from these trials as the sole remaining English king, and thereby as the first English Monarch.

In the early 9th century, Charlemagne's Christian empire had expanded to the southern border of the Danes, and Frankish sources (e.g. Notker of St Gall) provide the earliest historical evidence of the Danes. These report a King Gudfred, who appeared in present-day Holstein with a navy in 804 where diplomacy took place with the Franks; In 808, King Gudfred attacked the Obotrites and conquered the city of Reric whose population was displaced or abducted to Hedeby. In 809, King Godfred and emissaries of Charlemagne failed to negotiate peace, despite the sister of Godfred being a concubine of Charlemagne, and the next year King Godfred attacked the Frisians with 200 ships.

Viking raids along the coast of France and the Netherlands were large-scale. Paris was besieged and the Loire Valley devastated during the 10th century. One group of Danes was granted permission to settle in northwestern France under the condition that they defend the place from future attacks. As a result, the region became known as "Normandy" and it was the descendants of these settlers who conquered England in 1066.

The oldest parts of the defensive works of Danevirke near Hedeby at least date from the summer of 755 and were expanded with large works in the 10th century. The size and number of troops needed to man it indicates a quite powerful ruler in the area, which might be consistent with the kings of the Frankish sources. In 815 AD, Emperor Louis the Pious attacked Jutland apparently in support of a contender to the throne, perhaps Harald Klak, but was turned back by the sons of Godfred, who most likely were the sons of the above-mentioned Godfred. At the same time St. Ansgar travelled to Hedeby and started the Catholic Christianisation of Scandinavia.

Gorm the Old was the first historically recognized ruler of Denmark, reigning from c. 936 to his death c. 958. He ruled from Jelling, and made the oldest of the Jelling Stones in honour of his wife Thyra. Gorm was born before 900 and died c. 958. His rule marks the start of the Danish monarchy and royal house (see Danish monarchs' family tree).

The Danes were united and officially Christianized in 965 AD by Gorm's son Harald Bluetooth (see below), the story of which is recorded on the Jelling stones. The extent of Harald's Danish Kingdom is unknown, although it is reasonable to believe that it stretched from the defensive line of Dannevirke, including the Viking city of Hedeby, across Jutland, the Danish isles and into southern present day Sweden; Scania and perhaps Halland and Blekinge. Furthermore, the Jelling stones attest that Harald had also "won" Norway.

In retaliation for the St. Brice's Day massacre of Danes in England, the son of Harald, Sweyn Forkbeard mounted a series of wars of conquest against England. By 1014, England had completely submitted to the Danes. However, distance and a lack of common interests prevented a lasting union, and Sweyn's son Cnut the Great barely maintained the link between the two countries, which completely broke up during the reign of his son Hardecanute. A final attempt by the Norwegians under Harald Hardrada to reconquer England failed, but did pave the way for William the Conqueror's takeover in 1066.

=== Christianity, expansion and the establishment of the Kingdom of Denmark ===
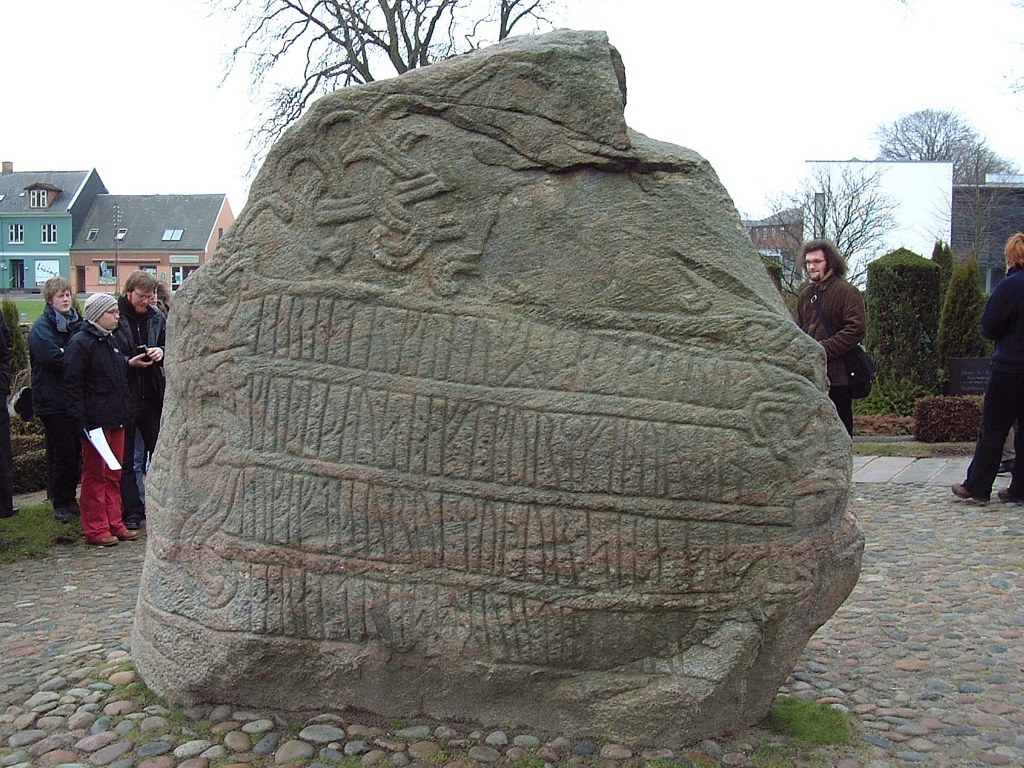
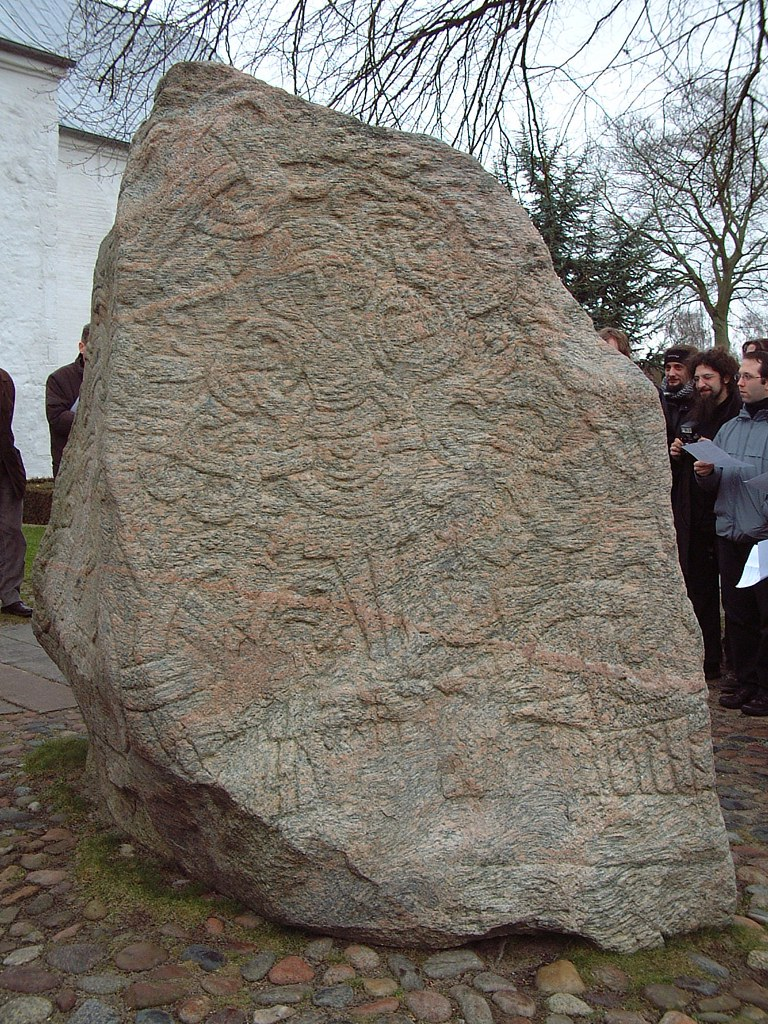
Often regarded as Denmark's "birth certificate", the large Jelling Stone announces the unification and Christianization of Denmark by Harald Bluetooth c. 980

The history of Christianity in Denmark overlaps with that of the Viking Age. Various petty kingdoms existed throughout the area now known as Denmark for many years. Between c. 960 and the early 980s, Harald Bluetooth appears to have established a kingdom in the lands of the Danes which stretched from Jutland to Skåne. Around the same time, he received a visit from a German missionary who, according to legend, survived an ordeal by fire, which convinced Harald to convert to Christianity.

Sweyn Estridson (1020–1074) re-established strong royal Danish authority and built a good relationship with Archbishop Adalbert of Hamburg-Bremen – at that time the archbishop of all of Scandinavia.

The new religion, which replaced the old Norse religious practices, had many advantages for the king. Christianity brought with it some support from the Holy Roman Empire. It also allowed the king to dismiss many of his opponents who adhered to the old mythology. At this early stage there is no evidence that the Danish Church was able to create a stable administration that Harald could use to exercise more effective control over his kingdom, but it may have contributed to the development of a centralising political and religious ideology among the social elite which sustained and enhanced an increasingly powerful kingship.

England broke away from Danish control in 1035 and Denmark fell into disarray for some time. Sweyn Estridsen's son, Canute IV, raided England for the last time in 1085. He planned another invasion to take the throne of England from an aging William I. He called up a fleet of 1,000 Danish ships, 60 Norwegian long boats, with plans to meet with another 600 ships under Duke Robert of Flanders in the summer of 1086. Canute, however, was beginning to realise that the imposition of the tithe on Danish peasants and nobles to fund the expansion of monasteries and churches and a new head tax (Danish: nefgjald) had brought his people to the verge of rebellion. Canute took weeks to arrive where the fleet had assembled at Struer, but he found only the Norwegians still there.

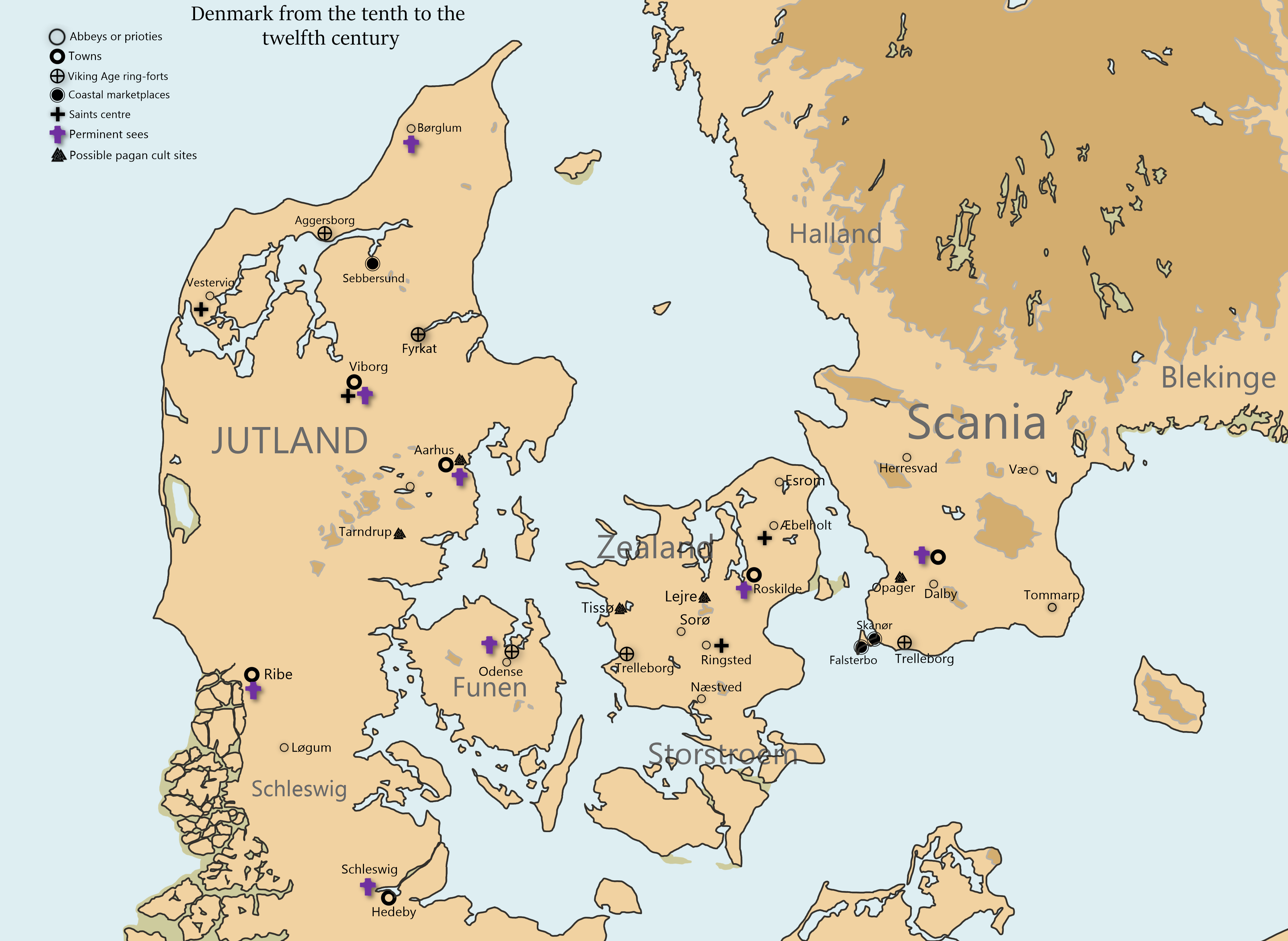
Ecclesiastical map of Denmark from the tenth to twelfth century

Canute thanked the Norwegians for their patience and then went from assembly to assembly (Danish: landsting) outlawing any sailor, captain or soldier who refused to pay a fine, which amounted to more than a year's harvest for most farmers. Canute and his housecarls fled south with a growing army of rebels on his heels. Canute fled to the royal property outside the town of Odense on Funen with his two brothers. After several attempts to break in and then bloody hand-to-hand fighting in the church, Benedict was cut down, and Canute was struck in the head by a large stone and then speared from the front. He died at the base of the main altar on 10 July 1086, where he was buried by the Benedictines. When Queen Edele came to take Canute's body to Flanders, a light allegedly shone around the church and it was taken as a sign that Canute should remain where he was.

The death of St. Canute marks the end of the Viking Age. Never again would massive flotillas of Scandinavians meet each year to ravage the rest of Christian Europe.

In the early 12th century, Denmark became the seat of an independent church province of Scandinavia. Not long after that, Sweden and Norway established their own archbishoprics, free of Danish control. The mid-12th century proved a difficult time for the kingdom of Denmark. Violent civil wars rocked the land. Eventually, Valdemar the Great (1131–82), gained control of the kingdom, stabilizing it and reorganizing the administration. King Valdemar and Absalon (ca 1128–1201), the bishop of Roskilde, rebuilt the country.

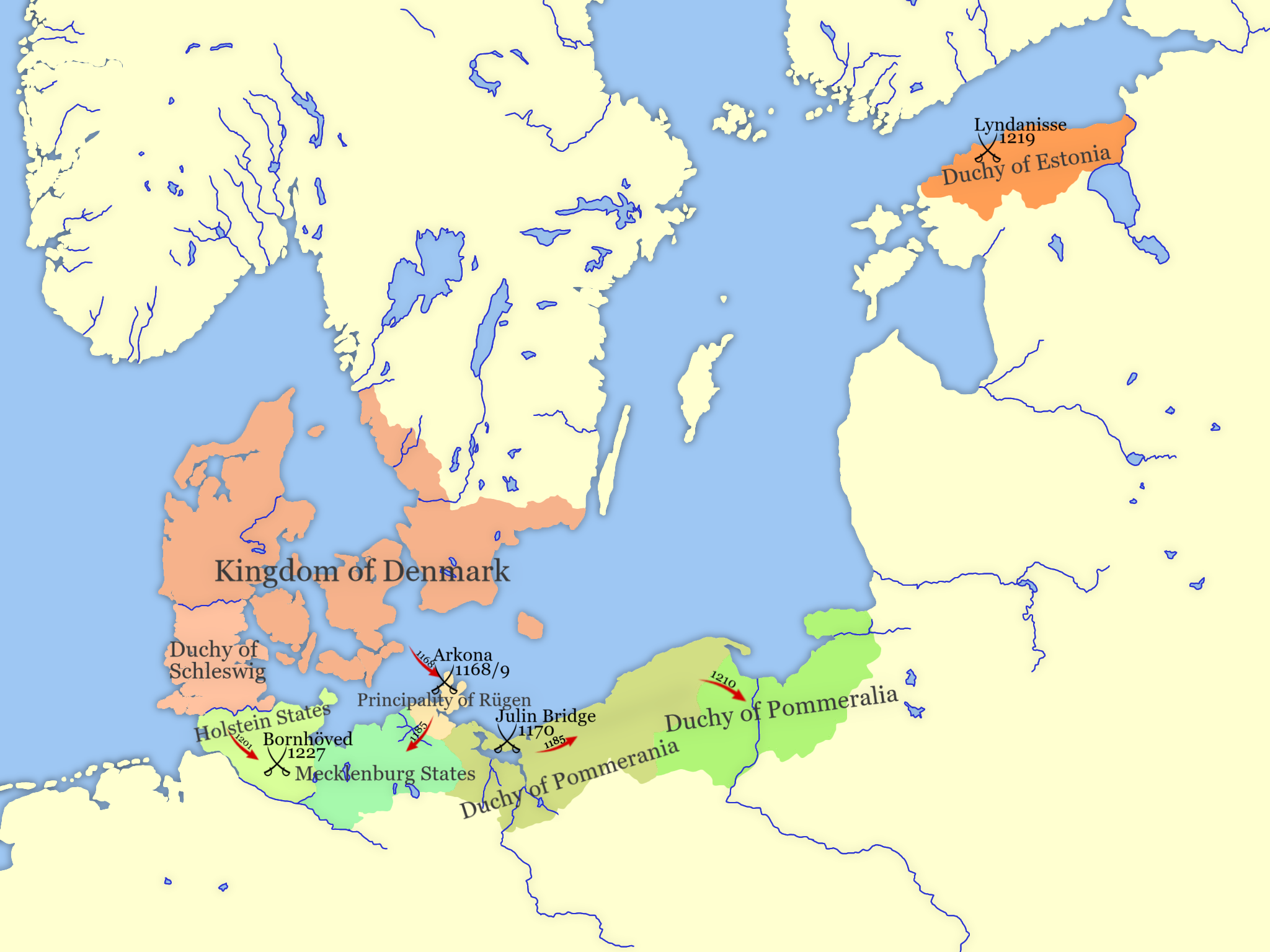
Danish Empire and campaigns 1168-1227

During Valdemar's reign construction began of a castle in the village of Havn, leading eventually to the foundation of Copenhagen, the modern capital of Denmark. Valdemar and Absalon built Denmark into a major power in the Baltic Sea, a power which later competed with the Hanseatic League, the counts of Holstein, and the Teutonic Knights for trade, territory, and influence throughout the Baltic. In 1168, Valdemar and Absalon gained a foothold on the southern shore of the Baltic, when they subdued the Principality of Rügen.

In the 1180s, Mecklenburg and the Duchy of Pomerania came under Danish control, too. In the new southern provinces, the Danes promoted Christianity (mission of the Rani, monasteries like Eldena Abbey) and settlement (Danish participation in the Ostsiedlung). The Danes lost most of their southern gains after the Battle of Bornhöved (1227), but the Rugian principality stayed with Denmark until 1325.

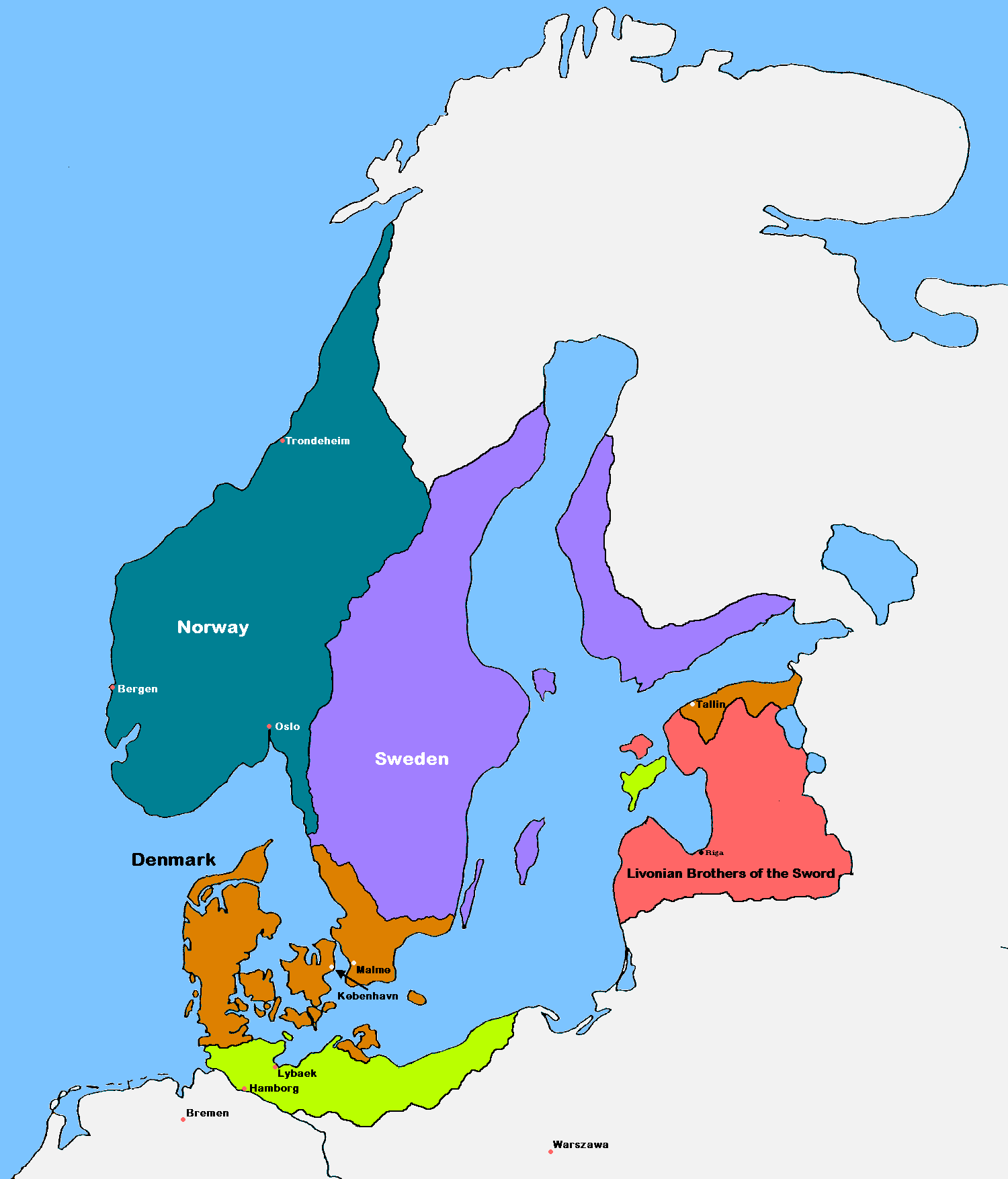
Northern countries in 1219 Norway Sweden Denmark Conquered by Denmark in 1219 (Pomerania conquered in 1219, lost in 1227. Ösel purchased in 1559, lost in 1645) Livonia before 1343

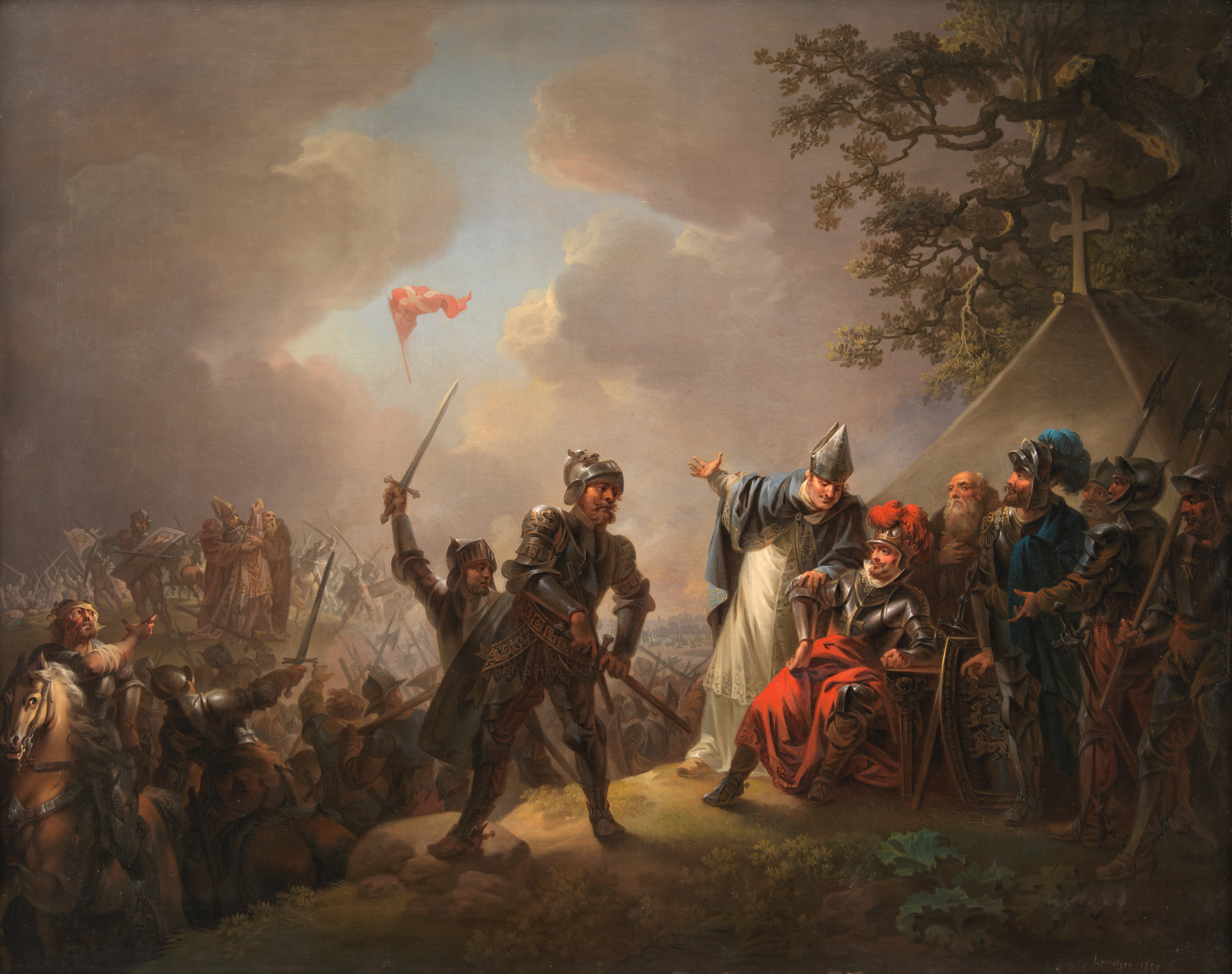
The flag of Denmark falling from the sky during the Battle of Lyndanisse on 15 June, 1219. Painted by C.A Lorentzen, 1809.

In 1202, Valdemar II became king and launched various "crusades" to claim territories, notably modern Estonia. Once these efforts were successful, a period in history known as the Danish Estonia began. Legend has it that the Danish flag, the Dannebrog fell from the sky during the Battle of Lindanise in Estonia in 1219. A series of Danish defeats culminating in the Battle of Bornhöved on 22 July 1227 cemented the loss of Denmark's north German territories. Valdemar himself was saved only by the courageous actions of a German knight who carried Valdemar to safety on his horse.

From that time on, Valdemar focused his efforts on domestic affairs. One of the changes he instituted was the feudal system where he gave properties to men with the understanding that they owed him service. This increased the power of the noble families (Danish: højadelen) and gave rise to the lesser nobles (Danish: lavadelen) who controlled most of Denmark. Free peasants lost the traditional rights and privileges they had enjoyed since Viking times.

The king of Denmark had difficulty maintaining control of the kingdom in the face of opposition from the nobility and from the Church. An extended period of strained relations between the crown and the Popes of Rome took place, known as the "archiepiscopal conflicts".

By the late 13th century, royal power had waned, and the nobility forced the king to grant a charter, considered Denmark's first constitution. Following the Battle of Bornhöved in 1227, a weakened Denmark provided windows of opportunity to both the Hanseatic League and the Counts of Holstein. The Holstein Counts gained control of large portions of Denmark because the king would grant them fiefs in exchange for money to finance royal operations.

Valdemar spent the remainder of his life putting together a code of laws for Jutland, Zealand and Skåne. These codes were used as Denmark's legal code until 1683. This was a significant change from the local law making at the regional assemblies (Danish: landsting), which had been the long-standing tradition. Several methods of determining guilt or innocence were outlawed including trial by ordeal and trial by combat. The Code of Jutland (Danish: Jyske Lov) was approved at meeting of the nobility at Vordingborg in 1241 just prior to Valdemar's death. Because of his position as "the king of Dannebrog" and as a legislator, Valdemar enjoys a central position in Danish history. To posterity the civil wars and dissolution that followed his death made him appear to be the last king of a golden age.

The Middle Ages saw a period of close cooperation between the Crown and the Roman Catholic Church. Thousands of church buildings sprang up throughout the country during this time. The economy expanded during the 12th century, based mostly on the lucrative herring-trade, but the 13th century turned into a period of difficulty and saw the temporary collapse of royal authority.

=== Count rule ===
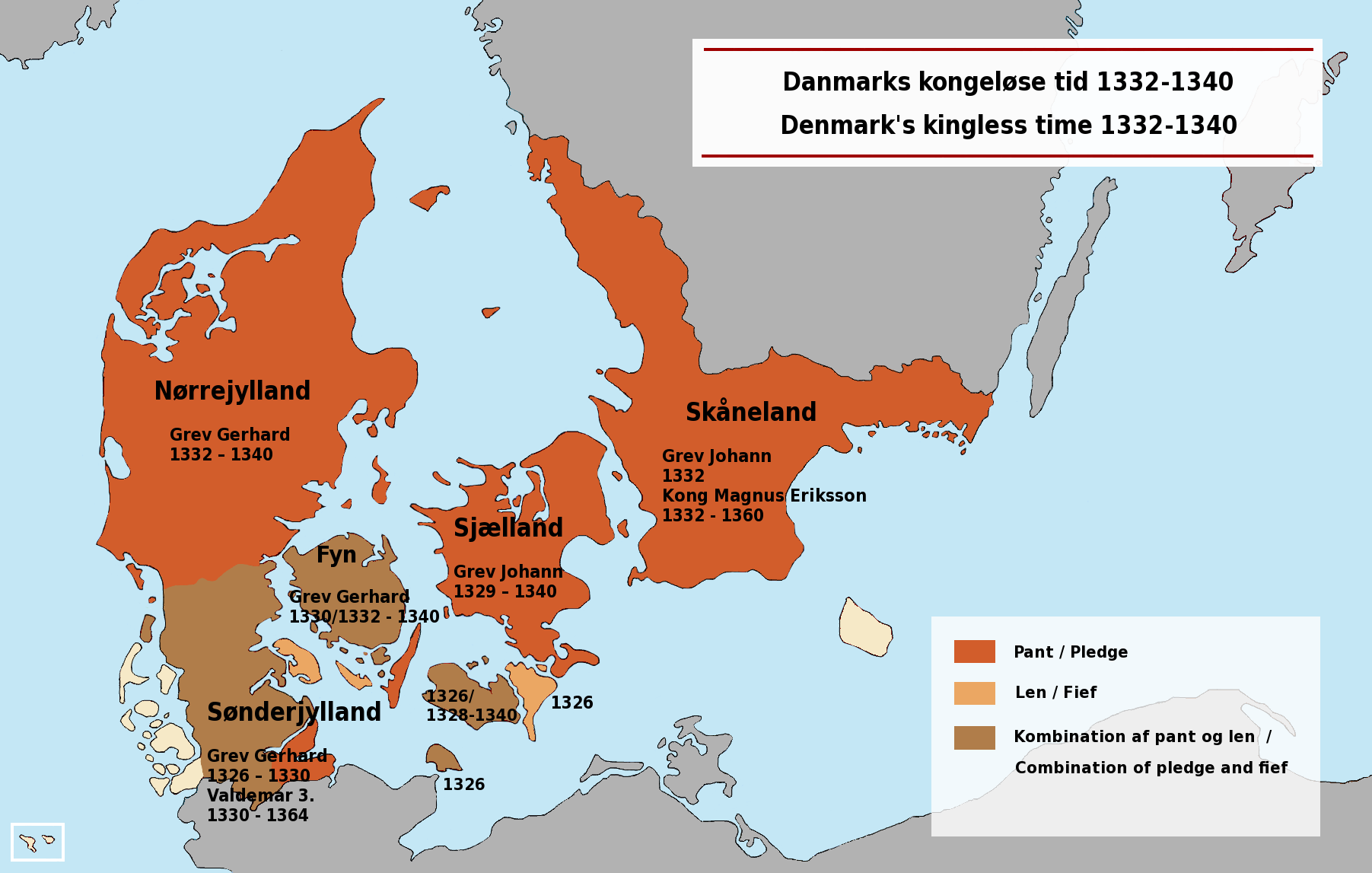
The kingless time 1332–1340. Danish Estonia not shown on the map was under the protection of the Livonian Order.

During the disastrous reign of Christopher II (1319–1332), most of the country was seized by the provincial counts (except Skåne, which was taken over by Sweden) after numerous peasant revolts and conflicts with the Church. For eight years after Christopher's death, Denmark had no king, and was instead controlled by the counts. After one of them, Gerhard III of Holstein-Rendsburg, was assassinated in 1340, Christopher's son Valdemar was chosen as king, and gradually began to recover the territories, which was finally completed in 1360.

The Black Death in Denmark, which came to Denmark during these years, also aided Valdemar's campaign. His continued efforts to expand the kingdom after 1360 brought him into open conflict with the Hanseatic League. He conquered Gotland, much to the displeasure of the League, which lost Visby, an important trading town located there.

The Hanseatic alliance with Sweden to attack Denmark initially proved a fiasco since Danish forces captured a large Hanseatic fleet, and ransomed it back for an enormous sum. Luckily for the League, the Jutland nobles revolted against the heavy taxes levied to fight the expansionist war in the Baltic; the two forces worked against the king, forcing him into exile in 1370. For several years, the Hanseatic League controlled the fortresses on the Sound, the strait between Skåne and Zealand.

=== Margaret and the Kalmar Union (1397–1523) ===
The Kalmar Union, c. 1400

Margaret I, the daughter of Valdemar Atterdag, found herself married off to Håkon VI of Norway in an attempt to join the two kingdoms, along with Sweden, since Håkon had kinship ties to the Swedish royal family. The dynastic plans called for her son, Olaf II to rule the three kingdoms, but after his early death in 1387 she took on the role herself (1387–1412). During her lifetime (1353–1412) the three kingdoms of Denmark, Norway, and Sweden (including the Faroe Islands, as well as Iceland, Greenland, and present-day Finland) became linked under her capable rule, in what became known as the Kalmar Union, made official in 1397.

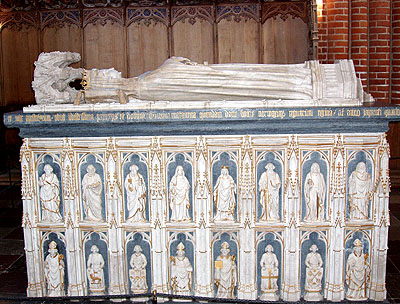
The tomb of Margaret I in Roskilde Cathedral.

Her successor, Eric of Pomerania (King of Denmark from 1412 to 1439), lacked Margaret's skill and thus directly caused the breakup of the Kalmar Union. Eric's foreign policy engulfed Denmark in a succession of wars with the Holstein counts and the city of Lübeck. When the Hanseatic League imposed a trade embargo on Scandinavia, the Swedes (who saw their mining industry adversely affected) rose up in revolt. The three countries of the Kalmar Union all declared Eric deposed in 1439.

However, support for the idea of regionalism continued, so when Eric's nephew Christopher of Bavaria came to the throne in 1440, he managed to get himself elected in all three kingdoms, briefly reuniting Scandinavia (1442–1448). The Swedish nobility grew increasingly unhappy with Danish rule and the union soon became merely a legal concept with little practical application. During the subsequent reigns of Christian I (1450–1481) and Hans (1481–1513), tensions grew, and several wars between Sweden and Denmark erupted.

In the early 16th century, Christian II (reigned 1513–1523) came to power. He allegedly declared, "If the hat on my head knew what I was thinking, I would pull it off and throw it away." This quotation apparently refers to his devious and machiavellian political dealings. He conquered Sweden in an attempt to reinforce the union, and had about 100 leaders of the Swedish anti-unionist forces killed in what came to be known as the Stockholm Bloodbath of November 1520. The bloodbath destroyed any lingering hope of Scandinavian union.

Map of Denmark–Norway, c. 1780

In the aftermath of Sweden's definitive secession from the Kalmar Union in 1521, civil war and the Protestant Reformation followed in Denmark and Norway. When things settled down, the Privy Council of Denmark had lost some of its influence, and that of Norway no longer existed. The two kingdoms, known as Denmark–Norway, operated in a personal union under a single monarch. Norway kept its separate laws and some institutions, such as a royal chancellor, separate coinage and a separate army. As a hereditary kingdom, Norway's status as separate from Denmark remained important to the royal dynasty in its struggles to win elections as kings of Denmark. The two kingdoms remained tied until 1814.

== Early Modern Denmark ==
Abraham Ortelius's 1570 map of Denmark including parts on the Scandinavian peninsula.

=== The Reformation ===
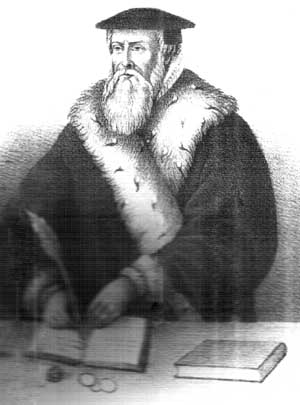
Hans Tausen was one of the first Lutheran preachers, and later a bishop, in Denmark.

The Reformation, which originated in the German lands in the early 16th century from the ideas of Martin Luther (1483–1546), had a considerable impact on Denmark. The Danish Reformation started in the mid-1520s. Some Danes wanted access to the Bible in their own language. In 1524 Hans Mikkelsen and Christiern Pedersen translated the New Testament into Danish; it became an instant best-seller.

Those who had traveled to Wittenberg in Saxony and come under the influence of the teachings of Luther and his associates included Hans Tausen, a Danish monk in the Order of St John Hospitallers. On Good Friday in 1525, Tausen used the pulpit at Antvorskov Abbey Church to proclaim Luther's reforms. His scandalized superiors ordered him out of Zealand and held him in the priory at Viborg under close confinement until he should come to his senses.

Townspeople came to see the troublesome monk, and Tausen preached to them from the window of his cell. Within days Tausen's ideas swept through the town. The then radical ideas of Luther found a receptive audience. Tausen's preaching converted ordinary people, merchants, nobles, and monks and even the Prior grew to appreciate Tausen and ordered his release. Tausen preached openly: much to the consternation of Bishop Jøn Friis, who lost his ability to do anything about the Lutherans and retreated to Hald Castle.

After preaching in the open air, Tausen gained the use of a small chapel, which soon proved too small for the crowds who attended services in Danish. His followers broke open a Franciscan Abbey so they could listen to Tausen, who packed the church daily for services. The town leaders protected Tausen from the Bishop of Viborg. Viborg became the center for the Danish Reformation for a time. Lutheranism spread quickly to Aarhus and Aalborg.

Within months King Frederick appointed Tausen as one of his personal chaplains (October 1526) in order to protect him from Catholics. Tausen's version of Luther's ideas spread throughout Denmark. Copenhagen became a hotbed of reformist activity and Tausen moved there to continue his work. His reputation preceded him and the excitement of hearing the liturgy in Danish brought thousands of people out to hear him. With the kings' permission, churches in Copenhagen opened their doors to the Lutherans and held services for Catholics and for Lutherans at different times of the day.

At Our Lady Church, the main church of Copenhagen, Bishop Ronnow refused to admit the "heretics". In December 1531, a mob stormed the Church of Our Lady in Copenhagen, encouraged by Copenhagen's fiery mayor, Ambrosius Bogbinder. They tore down statues and side-altars and destroyed artwork and reliquaries. Frederick I's policy of toleration insisted that the two competing groups share churches and pulpits peacefully, but this satisfied neither Lutherans nor Catholics.

Luther's ideas spread rapidly as a consequence of a powerful combination of popular enthusiasm for church reform and a royal eagerness to secure greater wealth through the seizure of church lands and property. In Denmark the reformation increased the crown's revenues by 300%.

==== Dissatisfaction with the Catholic Church ====
Dissatisfaction with the established Catholic Church had already been widespread in Denmark. Many people viewed the tithes and fees — a constant source of irritation for farmers and merchants — as unjust. This became apparent once word got out that King Frederick and his son, Duke Christian had no sympathy with Franciscans who persistently made the rounds of the parishes to collect food, money, and clothing in addition to the tithes. Between 1527 and 1536 many towns petitioned the king to close the Franciscan houses.

Frederick obliged by sending letters authorizing the closure of the monasteries, often offering a small sum of money to help the brothers on their way. With the royal letter in hand, mobs forcibly closed Franciscan abbeys all over Denmark. They beat up monks, two of whom died. The closure of Franciscan houses occurred systematically in Copenhagen, Viborg, Aalborg, Randers, Malmö and ten other cities; in all, 28 monasteries or houses closed. People literally hounded Franciscan monks out of the towns.

No other order faced such harsh treatment. Considering how strongly many people felt about removing all traces of Catholic traditions from Danish churches, surprisingly little violence took place. Luther's teaching had become so overwhelmingly popular that Danes systematically cleared churches of statues, paintings, wall-hangings, reliquaries and other Catholic elements without interference. The only exceptions came in individual churches where the local churchmen refused to permit reform.

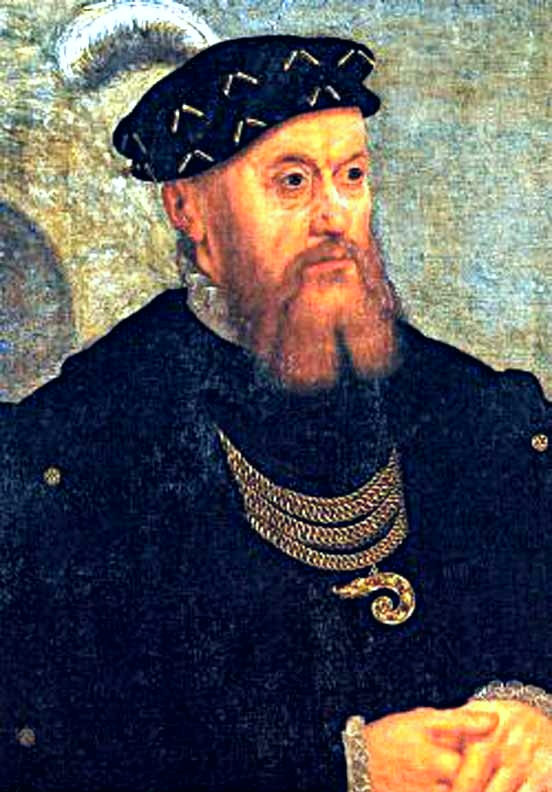
King Christian III carried out the Protestant Reformation in Slesvig, Holsten, Denmark and Norway.

Frederick I died in 1533; the Viborg Assembly (Danish: landsting) proclaimed his son, Duke Christian of Schleswig, King Christian III. The State Council (Danish: Rigsråd) on Zealand, led by the Catholic bishops, took control of the country and refused to recognize the election of Christian III, a staunch Lutheran. The regents feared Christian's zeal for Luther's ideas would tip the balance and disenfranchise Catholics — both peasants and nobles.

The State Council encouraged Count Christopher of Oldenburg to become Regent of Denmark. Christian III quickly raised an army to enforce his election, including mercenary troops from Germany. Count Christopher raised an army (including troops from Mecklenburg and Oldenburg and the Hanseatic League, especially Lübeck) to restore his Catholic uncle King Christian II (deposed in 1523). This resulted in a three-year civil war called the Count's Feud (Danish: Grevens Fejde).

==== Count's Feud (1534–1536) ====
Armed rebellion by Catholic peasants led by Skipper Clement started in northern Jutland. Rebellion swept across Funen, Zealand and Skåne. Christian III's army soundly defeated an army of Catholic nobles at Svenstrup on 16 October 1534. Christian forced a truce with the Hanseatic League, which had sent troops to help Count Christopher. Christian III's army, under Johan Rantzau, chased the rebels all the way back to Aalborg and then massacred over 2,000 of them inside the city in December 1534.

The Protestants captured Skipper Clement (1534), and later executed him in 1536. Christian III's mercenary troops put an end to Catholic hopes on Zealand and then Funen. Skåne rebels went as far as proclaiming Christian II king again. King Gustav Vasa of Sweden sent two separate armies to ravage Halland and Skåne into submission. Besiegers finally starved the last hold-outs in the rebellion, Copenhagen and Malmø, into surrender in July 1536. By the spring of 1536, Christian III had taken firm control.

==== State Lutheranism ====
Denmark became officially Lutheran on 30 October 1536 by decree of King Christian III, and in 1537 the reconstituted State Council approved the Lutheran Ordinances which was worked out by Danish theologians and Johannes Bugenhagen, based on the Augsburg Confession and Luther's Little Catechism. The government established the Danish National Church (Danish: Folkekirken) as the state church. All of Denmark's Catholic bishops went to prison until such time as they converted to Luther's reform. The authorities released them when they promised to marry and to support the reforms.

If they agreed, they received property and spent the rest of their lives as wealthy landowners. If they refused conversion, they died in prison. The State confiscated Church lands to pay for the armies that had enforced Christian III's election. Priests swore allegiance to Lutheranism or found new employment. The new owners turned monks out of their monasteries and abbeys. Nuns in a few places gained permission to live out their lives in nunneries, though without governmental financial support. The Crown closed churches, abbeys, priories and cathedrals, giving their property to local nobles or selling it.

The King appointed Danish superintendents (later bishops) to oversee Lutheran orthodoxy in the church. Denmark became part of a Lutheran heartland extending through Scandinavia and northern Germany. The Catholic Church everywhere in Scandinavia had sealed its fate by supporting hopeless causes: Christian II and the emperor Charles V in Denmark, Norwegian independence in that country, and in Sweden the Kalmar Union. Geographical distance also prevented them from receiving anything more than a sympathetic ear from Rome.

The 17th century saw a period of strict Lutheran orthodoxy in Denmark, with harsh punishments visited on suspected followers of either Calvinism or Huldrych Zwingli. Lutheran authorities treated Catholics harshly — in the fear that they might undermine the king, government, and national church. In a delayed result of the Reformation, Denmark became embroiled in the Thirty Years' War (1618–1648) on the Protestant side.

=== The loss of Eastern Denmark ===
The Dano-Norwegian Kingdom grew wealthy during the 16th century, largely because of the increased traffic through the Øresund, which Danes could tax because Denmark controlled both sides of the Sound. The trade in grain exports from Poland to the Netherlands and to the rest of Europe grew enormously at this time, and the Danish kings did not hesitate to cash in on it. The Sound duty was only repealed in the 1840s.

The Danish economy benefited from the Eighty Years' War (1568–1648) in the Netherlands because a large number of skilled refugees from that area (the most economically advanced in Europe) came to Denmark. This helped to modernize many aspects of society and to establish trading links between Denmark and the Netherlands.

Denmark–Norway had a reputation as a relatively powerful kingdom at this time. European politics of the 16th century revolved largely around the struggle between Catholic and Protestant forces, so it seemed almost inevitable that Denmark, a strong, unified Lutheran kingdom, would get drawn into the larger war when it came. The Thirty Years' War went badly for the Protestant states in the early 1620s, and a call went out to Denmark–Norway to "save the Protestant cause".

King Christian IV, who was also a duke of the Holy Roman Empire on the basis of his possessions in Holstein, decided to intervene in the conflict raging in northern Germany. The campaign ended in defeat, and Jutland was occupied by the imperial army of Albrecht von Wallenstein. In the Treaty of Lübeck, Christian made peace and agreed to not intervene in Germany again. The war in Germany had been very expensive and Christian IV saw no other recourse than to raise the Sound tolls. Unfortunately, this act pushed the Netherlands away from Denmark and into the arms of Sweden.

==== Torstenson War (1643–1645) ====
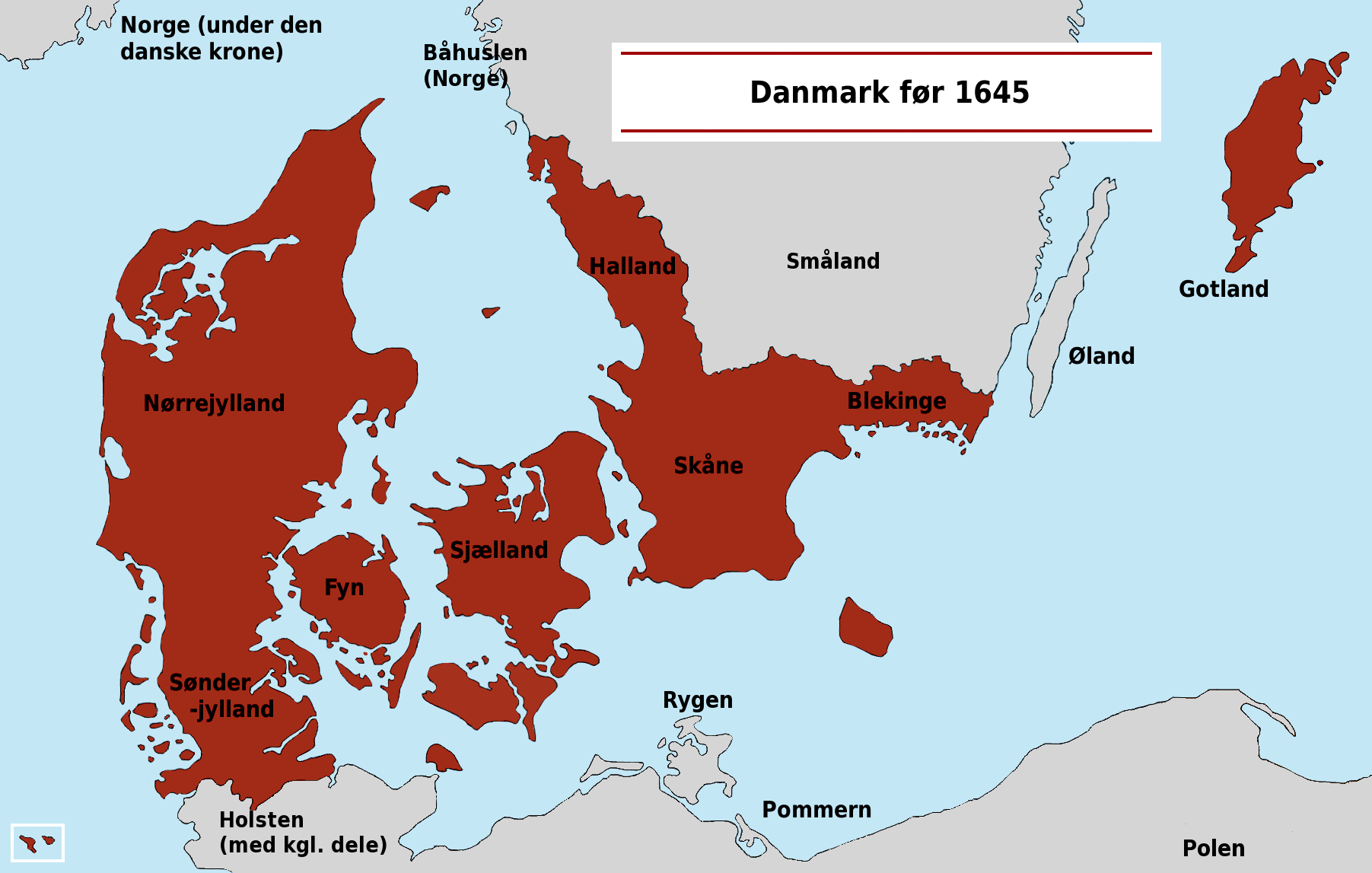
Denmark before 1645

In 1643, Sweden's armies, under the command of Lennart Torstensson, suddenly invaded Denmark without declaring war. The ensuing conflict became known as the Torstenson War. The Netherlands, wishing to end the Danish stranglehold on the Baltic, joined the Swedes in their war against Denmark–Norway. In October 1644, a combined Dutch-Swedish fleet destroyed 80 percent of the Danish fleet in the Battle of Femern. The result of this defeat proved disastrous for Denmark–Norway: in the Second treaty of Brömsebro (1645) Denmark ceded to Sweden the Norwegian provinces Jemtland, Herjedalen and Älvdalen as well as the Danish islands of Gotland and Øsel. Halland went to Sweden for a period of 30 years and the Netherlands were exempted from paying the Sound Duty.

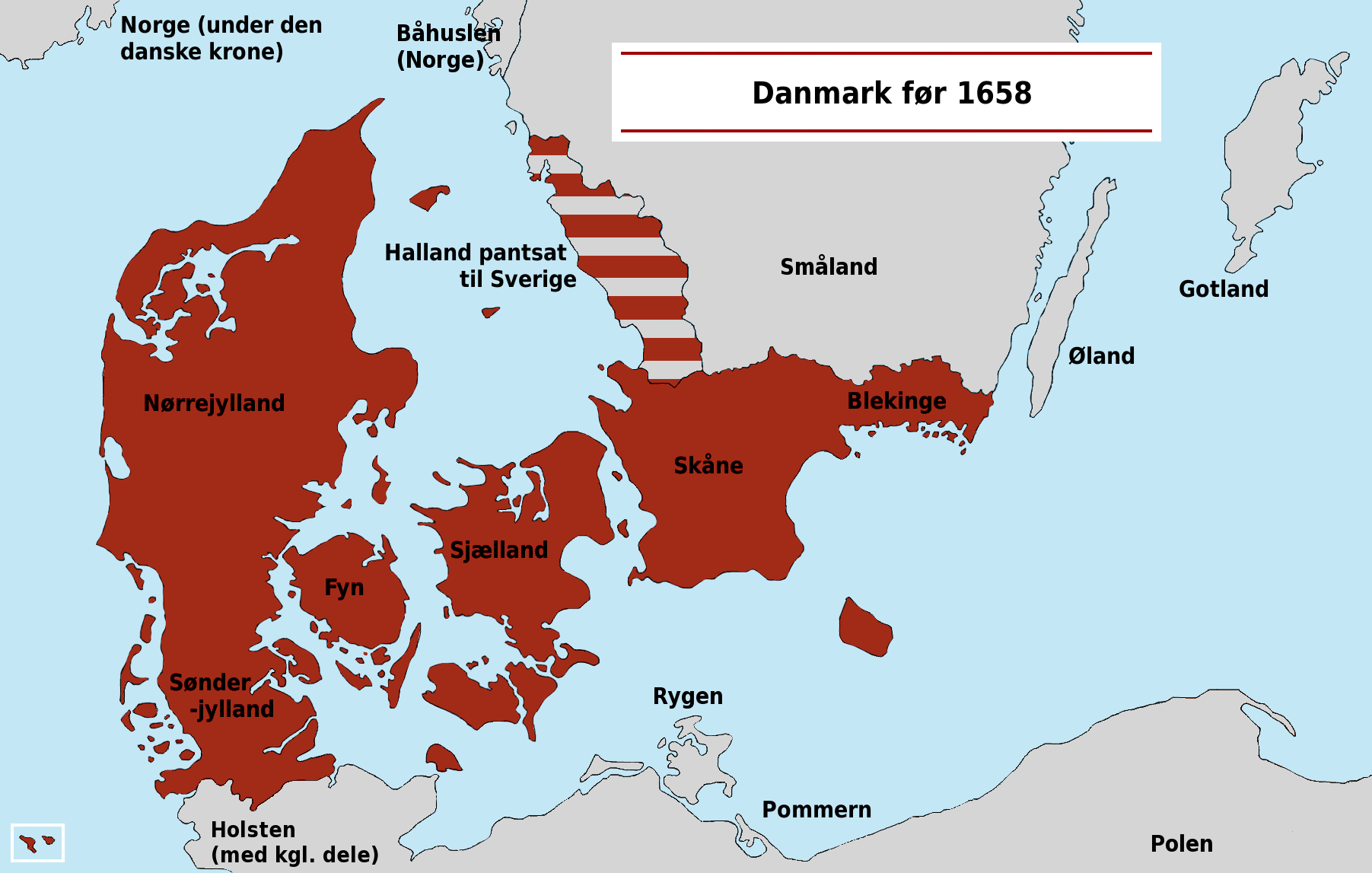
Denmark before 1658

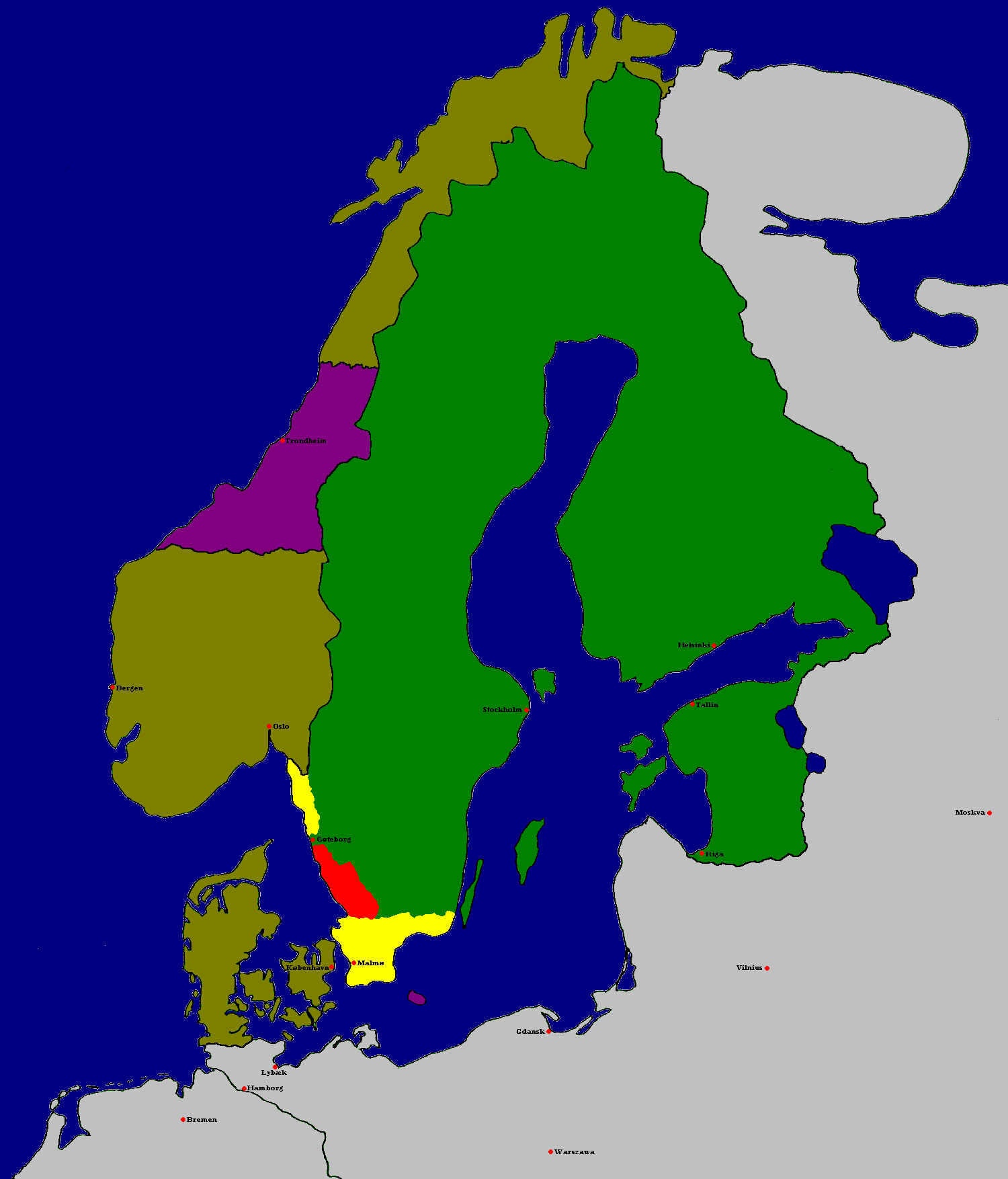
Treaty of Roskilde, 1658. Halland, previously occupied by Sweden for a 30-year period under the terms of the Peace of Brömsebro negotiated in 1645, was now ceded the Scanian lands and Bohus County were ceded Trøndelag and Bornholm provinces, which were ceded in 1658, but rebelled against Sweden and returned to Danish rule in 1660.

Nevertheless, Danes remember Christian IV as one of the great kings of Denmark. He had a very long reign, from 1588 to 1648, and has become known as "the architect on the Danish throne" because of the large number of building projects he undertook. Many of the great buildings of Denmark date from his reign. After the death of Christian IV in 1648, his son Frederick succeeded him.

==== Second Northern War (1655–1660) ====
In 1657, during the Second Northern War, Denmark–Norway launched a war of revenge against Sweden (then distracted in Poland) which turned into a complete disaster. The war became a disaster for two reasons: Primarily, because Denmark's new powerful ally, the Netherlands, remained neutral as Denmark was the aggressor and Sweden the defender. Secondly, the Belts froze over in a rare occurrence during the winter of 1657–1658, allowing Charles X Gustav of Sweden to lead his armies across the ice to invade Zealand.

In the following Treaty of Roskilde, Denmark–Norway capitulated and gave up all of Eastern Denmark (Danish: Skåne, Halland, Blekinge and Bornholm), in addition to the counties of Bohuslän (Norwegian: Båhuslen) and Trøndelag in Norway. Holstein-Gottorp was also tied to Sweden, providing a gateway for future invasions from the south.

But the Second Northern War was not yet over. Three months after the peace treaty was signed, Charles X Gustav of Sweden held a council of war where he decided to simply wipe Denmark from the map and unite all of Scandinavia under his rule. Once again the Swedish army arrived outside Copenhagen. However, this time the Danes did not panic or surrender. Instead, they decided to fight and prepared to defend Copenhagen.

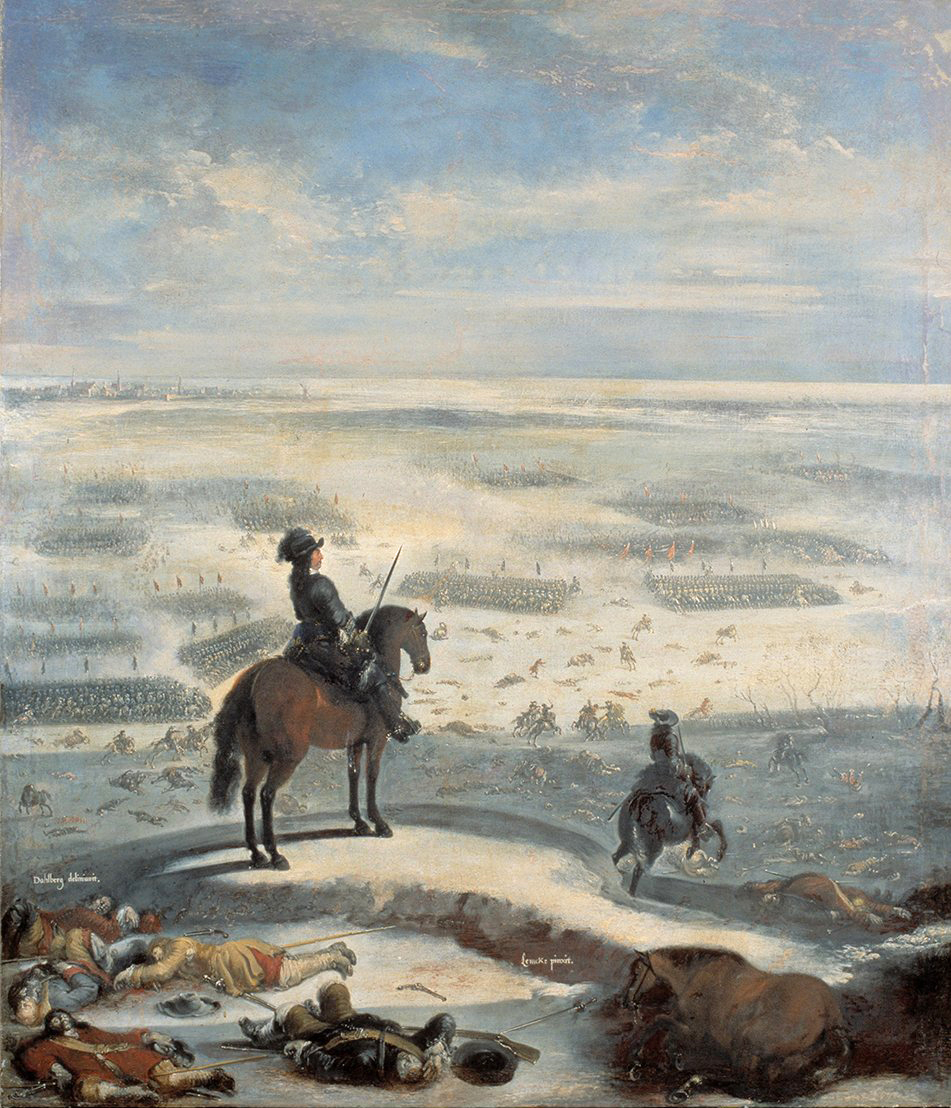
March across the Belts in 1658

Frederick III of Denmark had stayed in his capital and now encouraged the citizens of Copenhagen to resist the Swedes, by saying he would die in his nest. Furthermore, this unprovoked declaration of war by Sweden finally triggered the alliance that Denmark–Norway had with the Netherlands. A powerful Dutch fleet was sent to Copenhagen with vital supplies and reinforcements, which saved the city from being captured during the Swedish attack. Furthermore, Brandenburg-Prussia, the Polish–Lithuanian Commonwealth and the Habsburg monarchy had gathered large forces to aid Denmark–Norway and fighting continued into 1659.

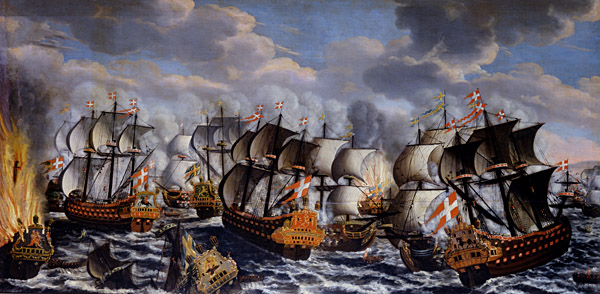
Battle of Køge Bay in 1677

Charles X Gustav of Sweden suddenly died of an illness in early 1660, while planning an invasion of Norway. Following his death, Sweden made peace in the Treaty of Copenhagen. The Swedes returned Trøndelag to Norway and Bornholm to Denmark, but kept both Bohuslän and Terra Scania. The Netherlands and other European powers accepted the settlement, not wanting both coasts of the Sound controlled by Denmark. This treaty established the boundaries between Norway, Denmark, and Sweden that still exist today. All in all, Sweden had now surpassed Denmark as the most powerful country in Scandinavia.

=== Absolutism ===
As a result of the disaster in the war against Sweden, King Frederick III (reigned 1648–1670) succeeded in convincing the nobles to give up some of their powers and their exemption from taxes, leading to the era of absolutism in Denmark. The country's main objective in the following decades was the recovery of its lost provinces from Sweden. In the 1670s, Denmark–Norway had regained enough strength to start a war with Sweden to recover its lost provinces. However, in spite of Denmark's outside support, naval dominance and initial support from the population of the former eastern provinces, the war ended in a bitter stalemate.

==== Great Northern War (1700–1721) ====
A renewed attack during the Third Northern War (1700–1721) first resulted in the unfavourable Peace of Travendal, but after Denmark's re-entry into the war and Sweden's ultimate defeat by a large alliance, Sweden was no longer a threat to Denmark. However, the great powers opposed any Danish territorial gains, which meant the Treaty of Frederiksborg did not return the former eastern provinces to Denmark. Furthermore, Denmark was even forced to return Swedish Pomerania, held by Danish forces since 1715, to Sweden. Denmark now had no hope of recovering its lost provinces from Sweden. As noted earlier, the rest of Europe was simply against the Sound being controlled by a single nation ever again.

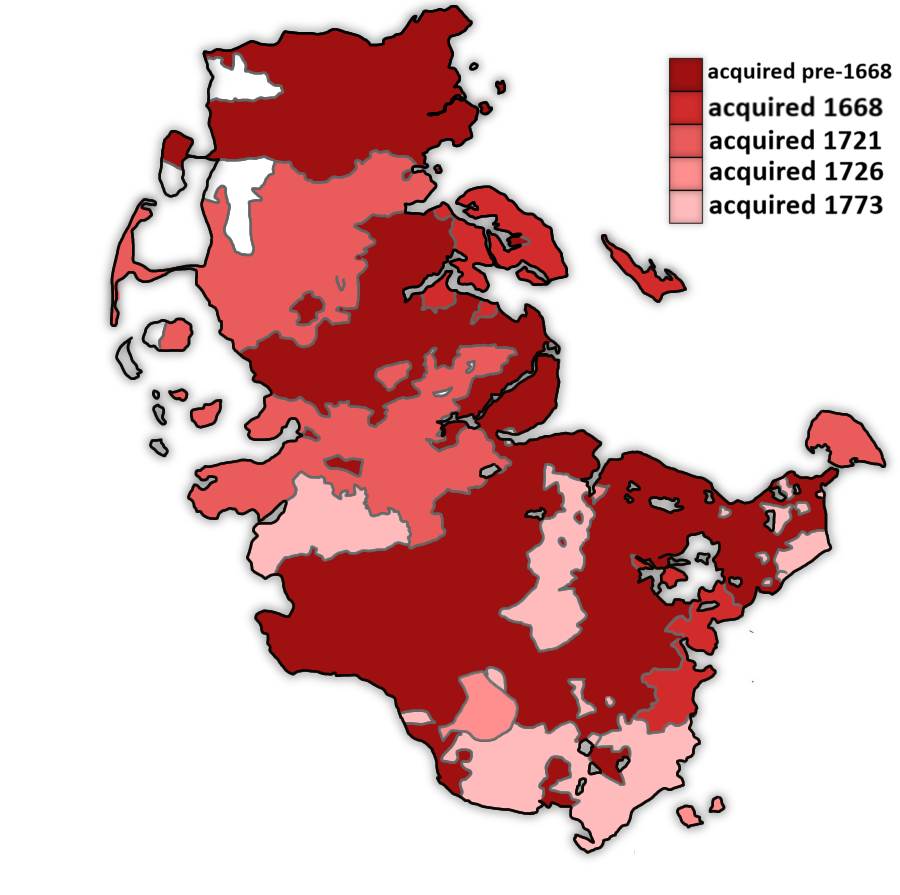
Unification process of Holstein

For most of the 18th century, Denmark was at peace. The only time when war threatened was in 1762, when the Duke of Holstein-Gottorp became Tsar Peter III of Russia and declared war on Denmark over his ancestral claims in Schleswig. Before any fighting could begin, however, he was overthrown by his wife, who took control of Russia as Tsarina Catherine II (Catherine the Great). Empress Catherine withdrew her husband's demands and negotiated the transfer of ducal Schleswig-Holstein to the Danish crown in return for Russian control of the County of Oldenburg and adjacent lands within the Holy Roman Empire, an exchange that was formalized with the 1773 Treaty of Tsarskoye Selo. The alliance that accompanied the territorial exchange tied Denmark's foreign policy to Russia's and led directly to Denmark's involvement in a series of wars over the succeeding decades.

With the suspension of the Danish diet, that body disappeared for a couple of centuries. During this time power became increasingly centralized in Copenhagen. Frederick's government reorganized itself in a much more hierarchical manner, built around the king as a focal point of administration. Crown officials dominated the administration, as well as a new group of bureaucrats, much to the dismay of the traditional aristocracy, who saw their own influence curtailed even further. The absolutist kings of Denmark were quite weak compared to their Swedish counterparts, and non-noble landlords became the real rulers of the country. They used their influence to pass laws that favored themselves.

The administration and laws underwent "modernization" during this period. In 1683, the Danske lov 1683 (Danish Code) standardized and collected all the old provincial laws. Other initiatives included the standardization of all weights and measures throughout the kingdom, and an agricultural survey and registry. This survey allowed the government to begin taxing landowners directly, moving it beyond dependence on revenue from crown lands.

The population of Denmark rose steadily through this period, from 600,000 in 1660 (after the loss of territory to Sweden) to 700,000 in 1720. By 1807, it had risen to 978,000.

==== Changes in the agricultural economy ====
Attempts to diversify the economy away from agriculture failed. During this period, little industry existed, except for a very small amount in Copenhagen (population: 30,000). In the late 17th century a small amount of industry did develop, catering to the military. Denmark suffered in part because of its lack of natural resources. It had nothing much to export except agricultural products. The Netherlands bought the largest share of Denmark's exports. The landlords, only about 300 in number, nevertheless owned 90% of the land in the country.

Rural administration remained primarily the preserve of the large landholders and of a few law-enforcement officials. In 1733, low crop prices caused the introduction of adscription, an effort by the landlords to obtain cheap labor. The effect of this was to turn the previously free Danish peasantry into serfs. The adscription system tied rural laborers to their place of birth and required them to rent farms on the estates.

As rent, peasants were required to work the landlords' plots and could not negotiate contracts or demand payment for improvements made to the farm. Peasants who refused to rent a farm were subject to six years of military service. Danish agriculture was very inefficient and unproductive as a result, since the peasants had no motivation to perform anything more than the absolute minimum of work. Attempts to sell Danish grain in Norway failed because of its low quality compared to grain from the Baltic.

In the late 18th century, extensive agricultural reforms took place, involving the abolition of the old open-field system and the amalgamation of many smaller farms into larger ones. With the abolition of the adscription system, the military could now only obtain manpower through conscription. These reforms were possible because agricultural prices steadily rose in the second half of the century.

Throughout the 18th century, the Danish economy did very well, largely on the basis of expanded agricultural output to meet growing demand across Europe. Danish merchant ships also traded around Europe and the North Atlantic, venturing to new Danish colonies in the Caribbean and North Atlantic.

==== The Enlightenment and Danish nationalism ====
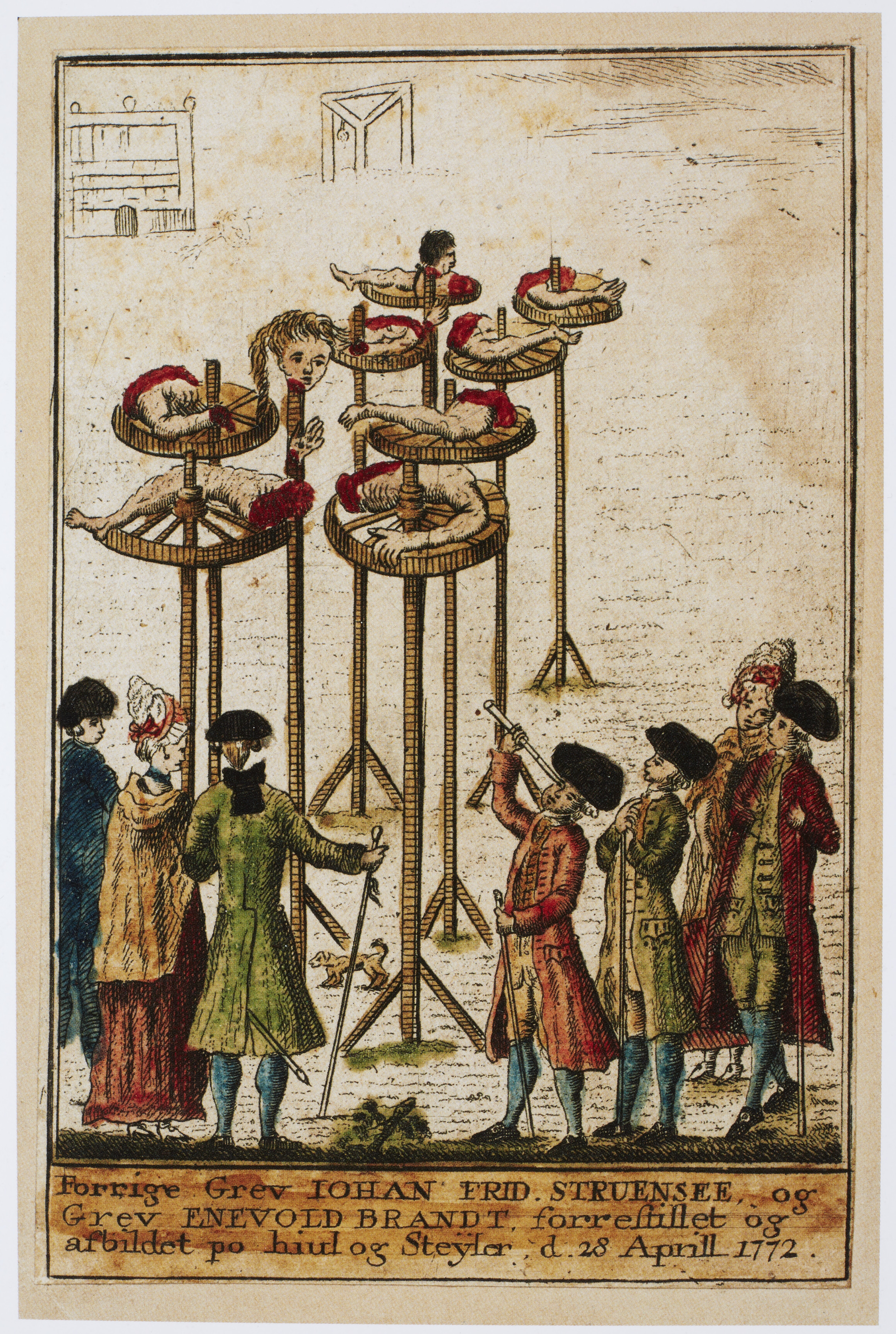
Denmark's social reformers Struensee and Brandt quartered and displayed on the wheel on 28 April 1772

New propriety and Enlightenment ideas became popular among the middle classes of Denmark, arousing increased interest in personal liberty. In the last 15 years of the 18th century, the authorities relaxed the censorship which had existed since the beginning of the 17th century. At the same time, a sense of Danish nationalism began to develop. Hostility increased against Germans and Norwegians present at the royal court. Pride in the Danish language and culture increased, and eventually a law banned "foreigners" from holding posts in the government. Antagonism between Germans and Danes increased from the mid-18th century on.

In the 1770s, during the reign of the mentally unstable Christian VII (1766–1808), the queen Caroline Matilda's lover, a German doctor named Johann Friedrich Struensee, became the de facto ruler of the country. Filled with the ideas of the Enlightenment, he attempted a number of radical reforms including freedom of the press and religion. But it was short-lived and saw open revolt. The landlords feared that the reforms were a threat to their power, while the commoners believed that religious freedom was an invitation to atheism.

In 1772, a court faction involving the king's stepmother had Struensee arrested, tried, and convicted of crimes against the majesty, his right hand was cut off following his beheading, his remains were quartered and put on display on top of spikes on the commons west of Copenhagen. The next 12 years were a period of unmitigated reaction until a group of reformers gained power in 1784.

===== Reforms =====
Denmark became the model of enlightened despotism, partially influenced by the ideas of the French Revolution. Denmark thus adopted liberalizing reforms in line with those of the French Revolution, with no direct contact. Danes were aware of French ideas and agreed with them, as it moved from Danish absolutism to a liberal constitutional system between 1750 and 1850. The change of government in 1784 was caused by a power vacuum created when King Christian VII took ill, and influence shifted to the crown prince (who later became King Frederick VI) and reform-oriented landowners. Between 1784 and 1815, the abolition of serfdom made the majority of the peasants into landowners. The government also introduced free trade and universal education. In contrast to France under the ancien regime, agricultural reform was intensified in Denmark, civil rights were extended to the peasants, the finances of the Danish state were healthy, and there were no external or internal crises. That is, reform was gradual and the regime itself carried out agrarian reforms that had the effect of weakening absolutism by creating a class of independent peasant freeholders. Much of the initiative came from well-organized liberals who directed political change in the first half of the 19th century.

===== Newspapers =====
Danish news media first appeared in the 1540s, when handwritten fly sheets reported on the news. In 1666, Anders Bording, the father of Danish journalism, began a state paper. The royal privilege to bring out a newspaper was issued to Joachim Wielandt in 1720. University officials handled the censorship, but in 1770 Denmark became one of the first nations of the world to provide for press freedom; it ended in 1799. In 1795–1814, the press, led by intellectuals and civil servants, called out for a more just and modern society, and spoke out for the oppressed tenant farmers against the power of the old aristocracy.

In 1834, the first liberal newspaper appeared, one that gave much more emphasis to actual news content rather than opinions. The newspapers championed the Revolution of 1848 in Denmark. The new constitution of 1849 liberated the Danish press. Newspapers flourished in the second half of the 19th century, usually tied to one or another political party or labor union. Modernization, bringing in new features and mechanical techniques, appeared after 1900. The total circulation was 500,000 daily in 1901, more than doubling to 1.2 million in 1925. The German occupation brought informal censorship; some offending newspaper buildings were simply blown up by the Nazis. During the war, the underground produced 550 newspapers—small, surreptitiously printed sheets that encouraged sabotage and resistance.

=== Colonial ventures ===
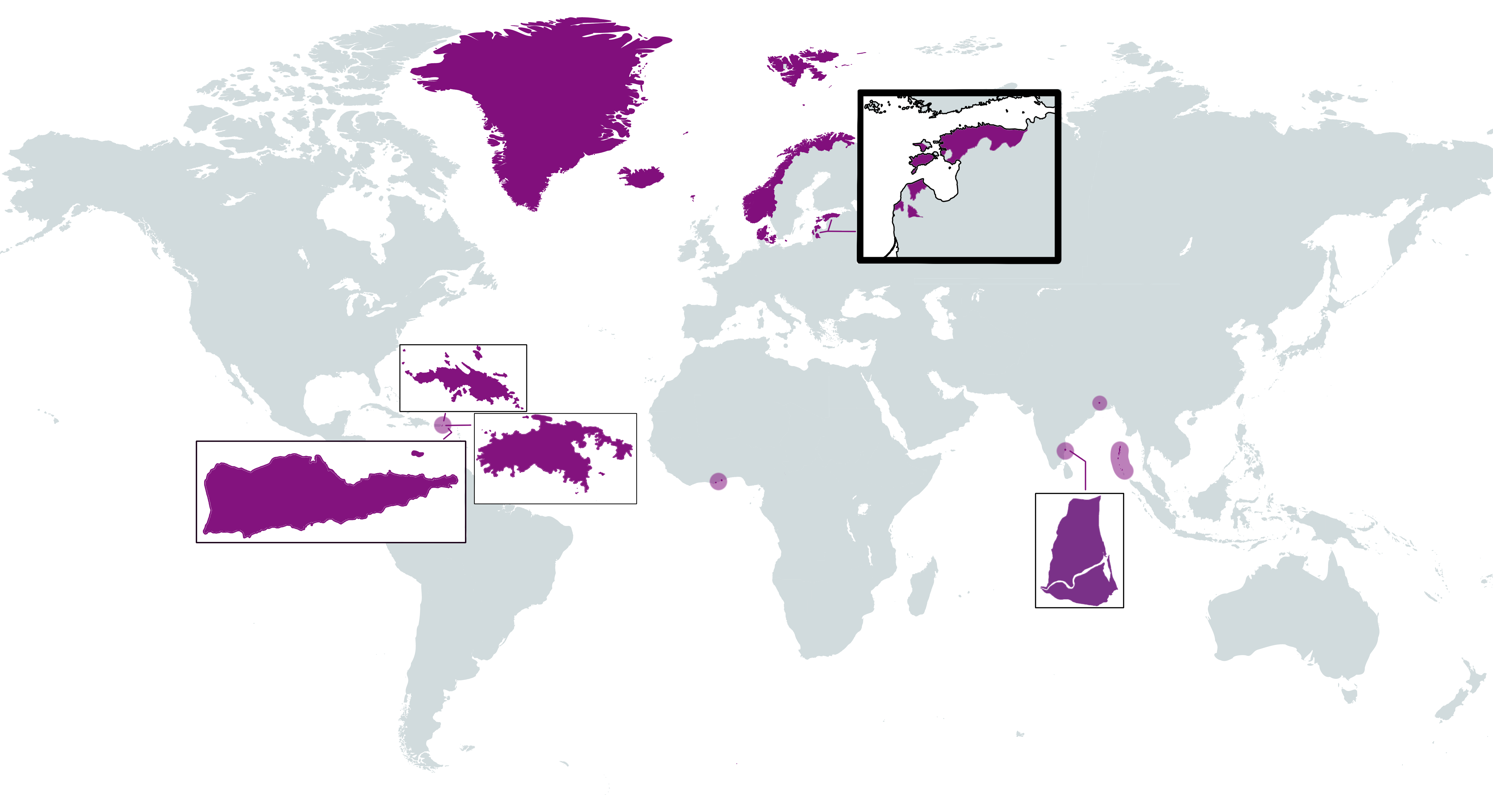
Map showing Denmark–Norway and its colonial possessions.

Denmark maintained a number of colonies outside Scandinavia, starting in the 17th century and lasting until the 20th century. Denmark also controlled traditional colonies in Greenland and Iceland in the north Atlantic, obtained through the union with Norway. Christian IV (reigned 1588–1648) first initiated the policy of expanding Denmark's overseas trade, as part of the mercantilist trend then popular in European governing circles. Denmark established its own first colony at Tranquebar, or Trankebar, on India's south coast, in 1620.

In the Caribbean, Denmark started a colony on St Thomas in 1671, St John in 1718, and purchased Saint Croix from France in 1733. Denmark maintained its Indian colony, Tranquebar, as well as several other smaller colonies there, for about two hundred years. The Danish East India Company operated out of Tranquebar. The Danes also established themselves in the Gold coast and fought against other European powers like Sweden and the Netherlands there.

During its heyday, Danish East Indian Company and the Swedish East India Company imported more tea than the British East India Company – and smuggled 90% of it into Britain, where it sold at a huge profit. Both of the Scandinavia-based East India Companies folded during the course of the Napoleonic Wars. Denmark also maintained other colonies, forts, and bases in West Africa, primarily for the purpose of slave-trading.

== 19th century ==
Danish Unitary State Helstaten (da) Dänischer Gesamtstaat (de)
- 1814–1864
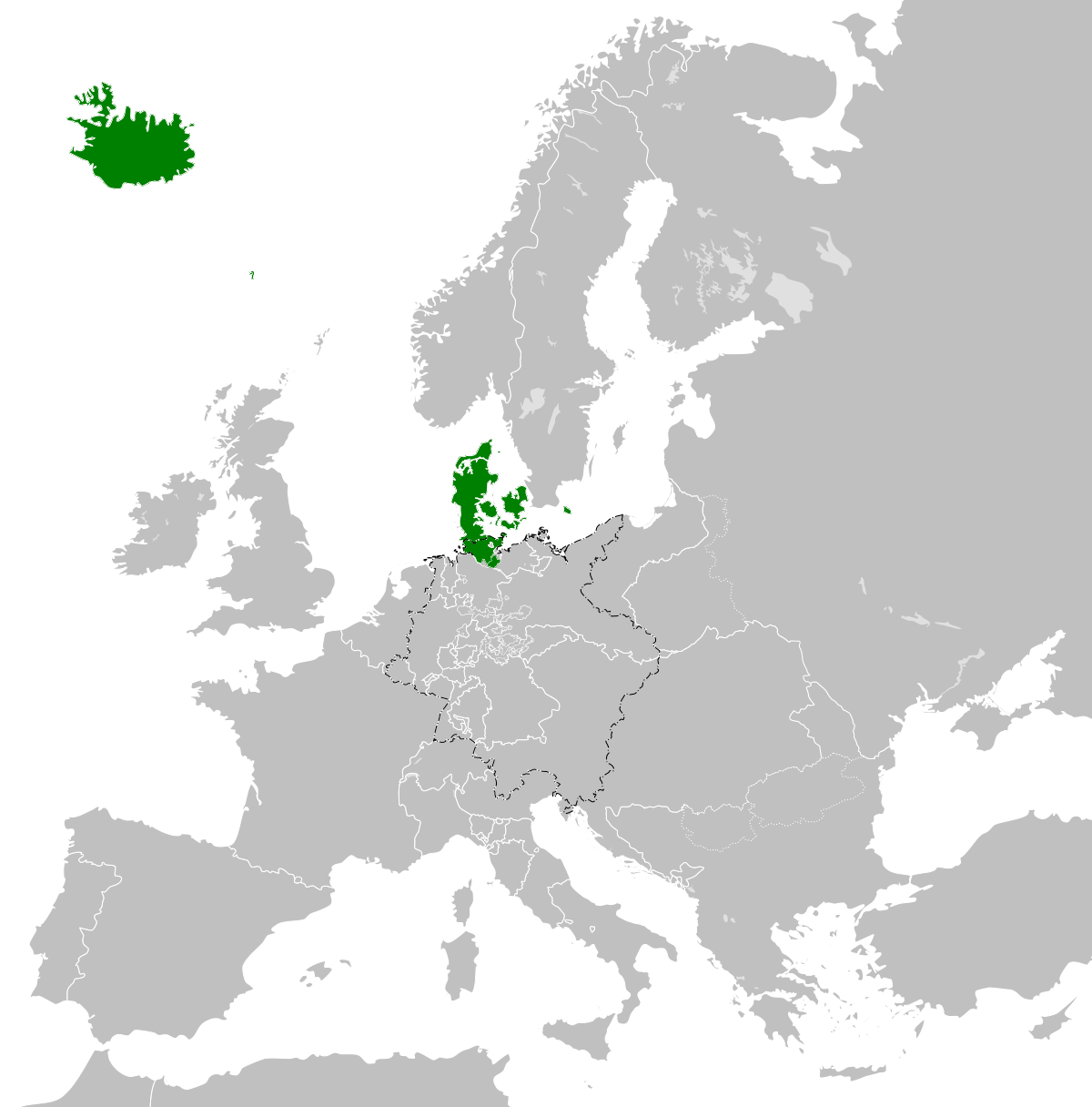
- Territories that were part of the Kingdom of Denmark from 1814 to 1864
- Status: personal union between Schleswig, Holstein, Lauenburg and Denmark
- Common languages: Danish, Frisian, German
- Religion: Lutheranism
- King of Denmark, Duke of Schleswig, Holstein and Lauenburg
  - 1808–1839: Frederik VI
  - 1839–1848: Christian VIII
  - 1848–1863: Frederik VII
  - 1863–1906: Christian IX
- Prime ministers (1848–1855) Council Presidents (1855–1864)
  - 1848–1852: Adam Wilhelm Moltke
  - 1852–1853: Christian Albrecht Bluhme
  - 1853–1854: Anders Sandøe Ørsted
  - 1854–1856: Peter Georg Bang
  - 1856–1857: Carl Christoffer Georg Andræ
  - 1857–1859: Carl Christian Hall
  - 1859–1860: Carl Edvard Rotwitt
  - 1863–1864: Ditlev Gothard Monrad
- Historical era: Late Modern Period
  - Established: 1814
  - Treaty of Kiel: 14 January 1814
  - First Schleswig War: 1848–1851
  - Disestablished: 1864

=== The Napoleonic Wars ===
The Battle of Copenhagen, 1801.

The long decades of peace came to an abrupt end during the French Revolutionary and Napoleonic Wars. Denmark-Norway initially attempted to stay neutral in the ongoing conflict in order to maintain their trade with both France and Britain. However, British fears that the Dano-Norwegians would ally with France led to a naval battle outside of Copenhagen in 1801, in which a Royal Navy fleet delivered a crushing blow to the Dano-Norwegian navy. Despite this, Denmark-Norway continued to remain neutral until 1807, when a British fleet bombarded Copenhagen and captured most of the Dano-Norwegian navy in order to prevent it from assisting Napoleon against Britain. This led to the Gunboat War, in which Danish gunboats fought against the British navy until 1814, though major engagements ended after the last Danish frigate was captured by the Royal Navy at Lyngør in 1812.

In 1809 Danish forces fighting on the French side participated in defeating the anti-Bonapartist German rebellion led by Ferdinand von Schill, at the Battle of Stralsund. By 1813, Denmark could no longer bear the war costs, and the state was bankrupt. When in the same year the Sixth Coalition isolated Denmark by clearing Northern Germany of French forces, Frederick VI had to make peace. Accordingly, the Treaty of Kiel was concluded in January 1814 with Sweden and Great Britain, and another peace was signed with Russia in February.

The post-Napoleonic Congress of Vienna demanded the dissolution of the Dano-Norwegian union, and this was confirmed by the Treaty of Kiel in 1814. The treaty transferred Heligoland to Great Britain and Norway from the Danish to the Swedish crown, Denmark was to be satisfied with Swedish Pomerania. But the Norwegians revolted, declared their independence, and elected crown-prince Christian Frederick (the future Christian VIII) as their king. However, the Norwegian independence movement failed to attract any support from the European powers. After a brief war with Sweden, Christian had to abdicate in order to preserve Norwegian autonomy, established in a personal union with Sweden. In favour of the Kingdom of Prussia, Denmark renounced her claims to Swedish Pomerania at the Congress of Vienna (1815), and instead was satisfied with the Duchy of Lauenburg and a Prussian payment of 3.5 million talers. Prussia also took over a Danish 600,000-taler debt to Sweden.

This period also counts as "the Golden Age" of Danish intellectual history. A sign of renewed intellectual vigor was the introduction of compulsory schooling in 1814. Literature, painting, sculpture, and philosophy all experienced an unusually vibrant period. The stories of Hans Christian Andersen (1805–1875) became popular not only in Denmark, but all over Europe and in the United States. The ideas of the philosopher Søren Kierkegaard (1813–1855) spread far beyond Denmark, influencing not only his own era, but proving instrumental in the development of new philosophical systems after him. The sculptures of Thorvaldsen (1770–1834) grace public buildings all over Denmark and other artists appreciated and copied his style. Grundtvig (1783–1872) tried to reinvigorate the Danish National Church and contributed to the hymns used by the church in Denmark.

=== Nationalism and liberalism ===
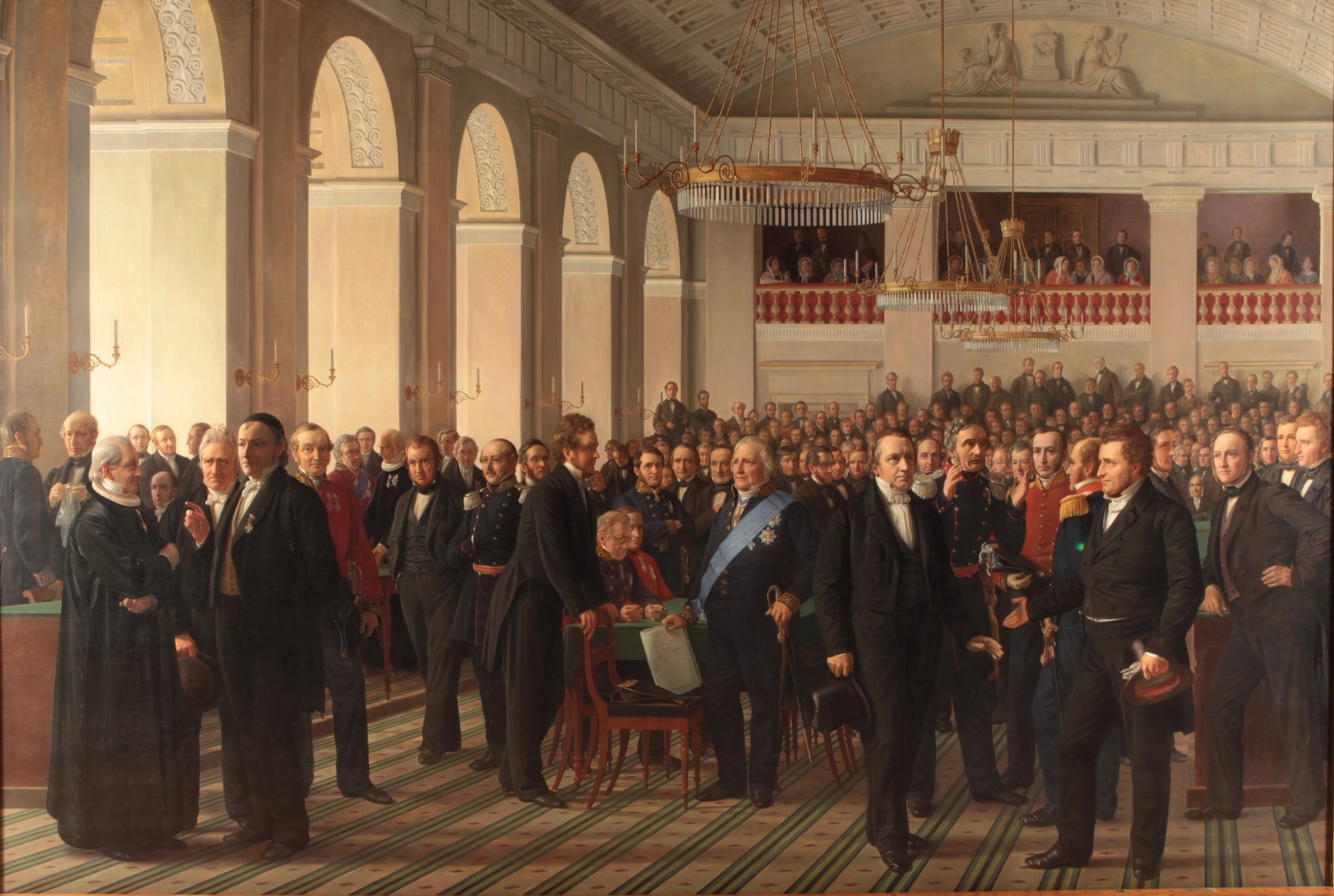
Den Grundlovgivende Rigsforsamling The Constitutional Assembly created The Danish constitution, 1860–1864 painting by Constantin Hansen.

The Danish liberal and national movements gained momentum in the 1830s, and after the European revolutions of 1848 Denmark became a constitutional monarchy on 5 June 1849. The growing bourgeoisie had demanded a share in government, and in an attempt to avert the sort of bloody revolution occurring elsewhere in Europe, Frederick VII gave in to the demands of the citizens. A new constitution emerged, separating the powers and granting the franchise to all adult males, as well as freedom of the press, religion, and association. The king became head of the executive branch. The legislative branch consisted of two parliamentary chambers; the Folketing, comprising members elected by the general population, and the Landsting, elected by landowners. Denmark also gained an independent judiciary.

Another significant result of the revolution was the abolition of slavery in the Danish West Indies, the Danish colony in the Caribbean, which at an earlier part of its history witnessed the biggest slave auctions in the world. In 1845 Denmark's other tropical colony, Tranquebar in India, was sold to Britain.

The Danish king's realm still consisted of the islands, the northern half of the Jutland peninsula, and the Duchy of Schleswig in real union with the Duchy of Holstein.

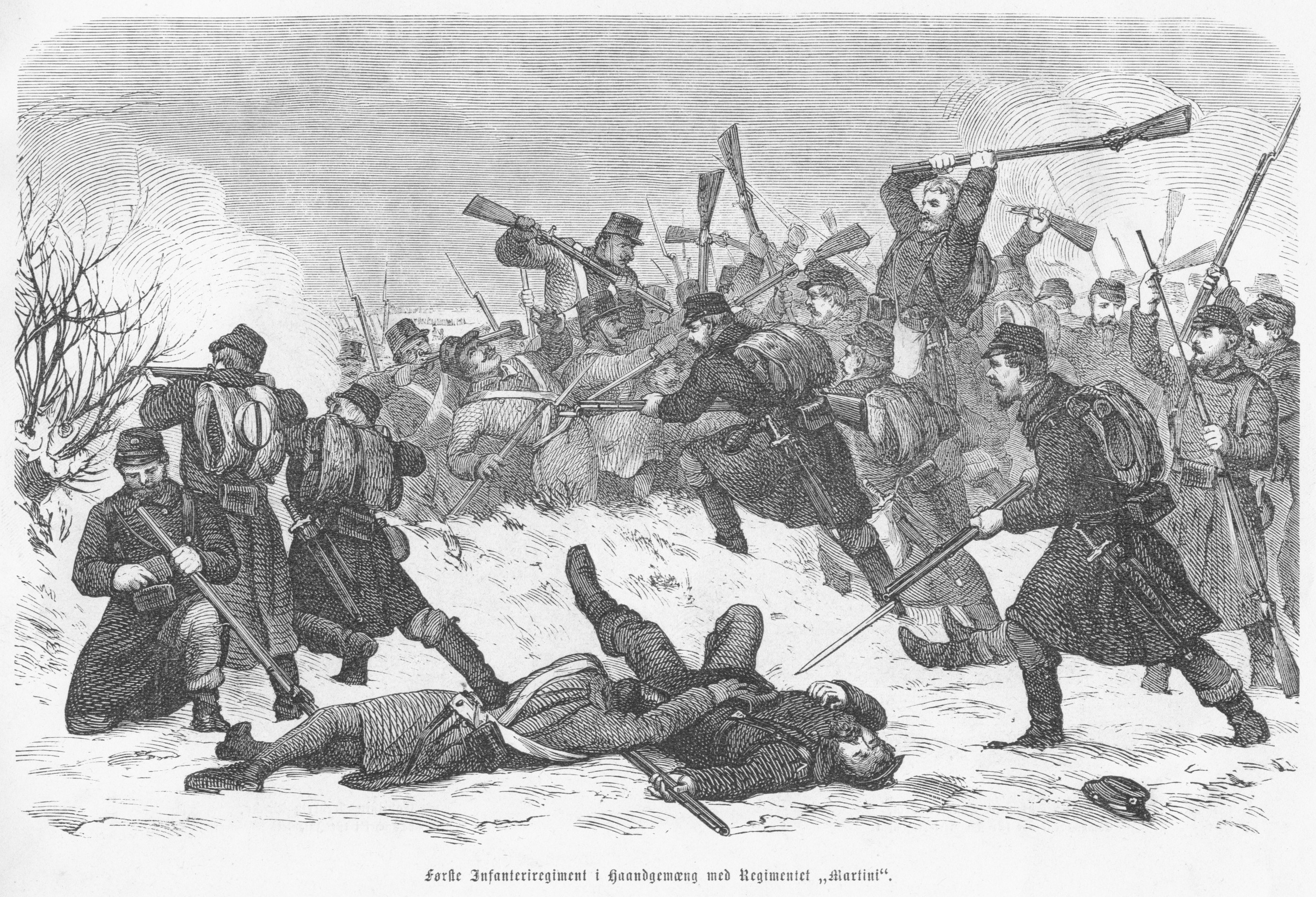
Danish Infantry regiment in a fight with regiment "Martini". Contemporary illustration of the 1864 Second Schleswig War.

The islands and Jutland together constituted the kingdom, whereas the monarch held the duchies in personal union with the kingdom. The duchy of Schleswig constituted a Danish fief, while the Duchy of Holstein remained a part of the German Confederation.

Since the early 18th century, and even more so from the early 19th century, the Danes had become used to viewing the duchies and the kingdom as increasingly unified in one state. This view, however, clashed with that of the German majority in the duchies, also enthused by liberal and national trends, which led to a movement known as Schleswig-Holsteinism. Schleswig-Holsteinists aimed for independence from Denmark. The First Schleswig War (1848–1851) broke out after constitutional change in 1849 and ended with the status quo because of the intervention of Britain and other Great Powers.

Much debate took place in Denmark as to how to deal with the question of Schleswig-Holstein. National-Liberals demanded permanent ties between Schleswig and Denmark, but stated that Holstein could do as it pleased. However, international events overtook domestic Danish politics, and Denmark faced war against both Prussia and Austria in what became known as the Second Schleswig War (1864). The war lasted from February to October 1864. Denmark was easily beaten by Prussia and Austria, and obliged to relinquish both Schleswig and Holstein.

The war caused Denmark as a nation severe trauma, forcing it to reconsider its place in the world. The loss of Schleswig-Holstein came as the latest in the long series of defeats and territorial loss that had begun in the 17th century. The Danish state had now lost some of the richest areas of the kingdom: Skåne to Sweden and Schleswig to Germany, so the nation focused on developing the poorer areas of the country. Extensive agricultural improvements took place in Jutland, and a new form of nationalism, which emphasized the "small" people, the decency of rural Denmark, and the shunning of wider aspirations, developed.

=== Industrialisation ===
Industrialisation came to Denmark in the second half of the 19th century. The nation's first railroads were constructed in the 1850s, and improved communications and overseas trade allowed industry to develop in spite of Denmark's lack of natural resources. Trade unions developed starting in the 1870s. There was a considerable migration of people from the countryside to the cities.

Danish agriculture became centered around the export of dairy and meat products, especially to Great Britain. Instead of relying on German middlemen in Hamburg, the Danes opened new direct trade routes to England after the defeat by the Germans. Lampke and Sharp argue that Denmark's success as in the dairy industry was not based on co-operatives, which came in the late nineteenth century. Instead leadership was in the hands of the landed, intellectual and political elites. They made land reforms, adopted new technologies, and started educational and trading systems. Together these made Denmark a major exporter of butter after 1850. Land reform enabled the growth of a middle ranking class of farmers. They copied the innovations pioneered by wealthy estate owners, and implemented them through newly formed co-operatives.

Internationalism and nationalism have become very much part of the history of the Danish Labour movement. The Labour movement gathered momentum when social issues became associated with internationalism. Socialist theory and organisational contact with the First International, which linked labour movements in various countries, paved the way. Louis Pio emerged as the driving force. In 1871, following the bloody defeat of the Paris Commune, he started publishing socialist journalism. He campaigned strongly for an independent organisation of the workers under their own management, and organised a Danish branch of the First International. This became the foundation stone for the Social Democratic Party under the name of Den Internationale Arbejderforening for Danmark (The International Labour Association for Denmark). As a combination of union and political party, it adroitly brought together national and international elements.

Pio saw internationalism as vital for the success of the workers' struggle: without internationalism, no progress. He pointed out that the middle classes cooperated across national frontiers and used nationalistic rhetoric as a weapon against the workers and their liberation.

The Danish section started organising strikes and demonstrations for higher wages and social reforms. Demands were moderate, but enough to provoke the employers and the forces of law and order. Things came to a head in the Battle of Fælleden on 5 May 1872. The authorities arrested the three leaders, Louis Pio, Poul Geleff and Harald Brix, charged them and convicted them of high treason. The three left Denmark for the United States to set up the ill-starred and short-lived socialist colony near Hays City, in Ellis County, Kansas.

Back in Denmark, the emerging political situation made possible by the new Danish door of independence alarmed many of the existing elites, since it inevitably empowered the peasantry. Simple men with little education replaced professors and professionals in positions of power. The peasants, in coalition with liberal and radical elements from the cities, eventually won a majority of seats in the Folketing. Even though constitutional changes had taken place to boost the power of the Landsting, the Left Venstre Party demanded to form the government, but the king, still the head of the executive branch, refused. However, in 1901, king Christian IX gave in and asked Johan Henrik Deuntzer, a member of Venstre, to form a government, the Cabinet of Deuntzer. This began a tradition of parliamentary government, and with the exception of the Easter Crisis of 1920, no government since 1901 has ruled against a parliamentary majority in the Folketing.

=== Monetary union ===
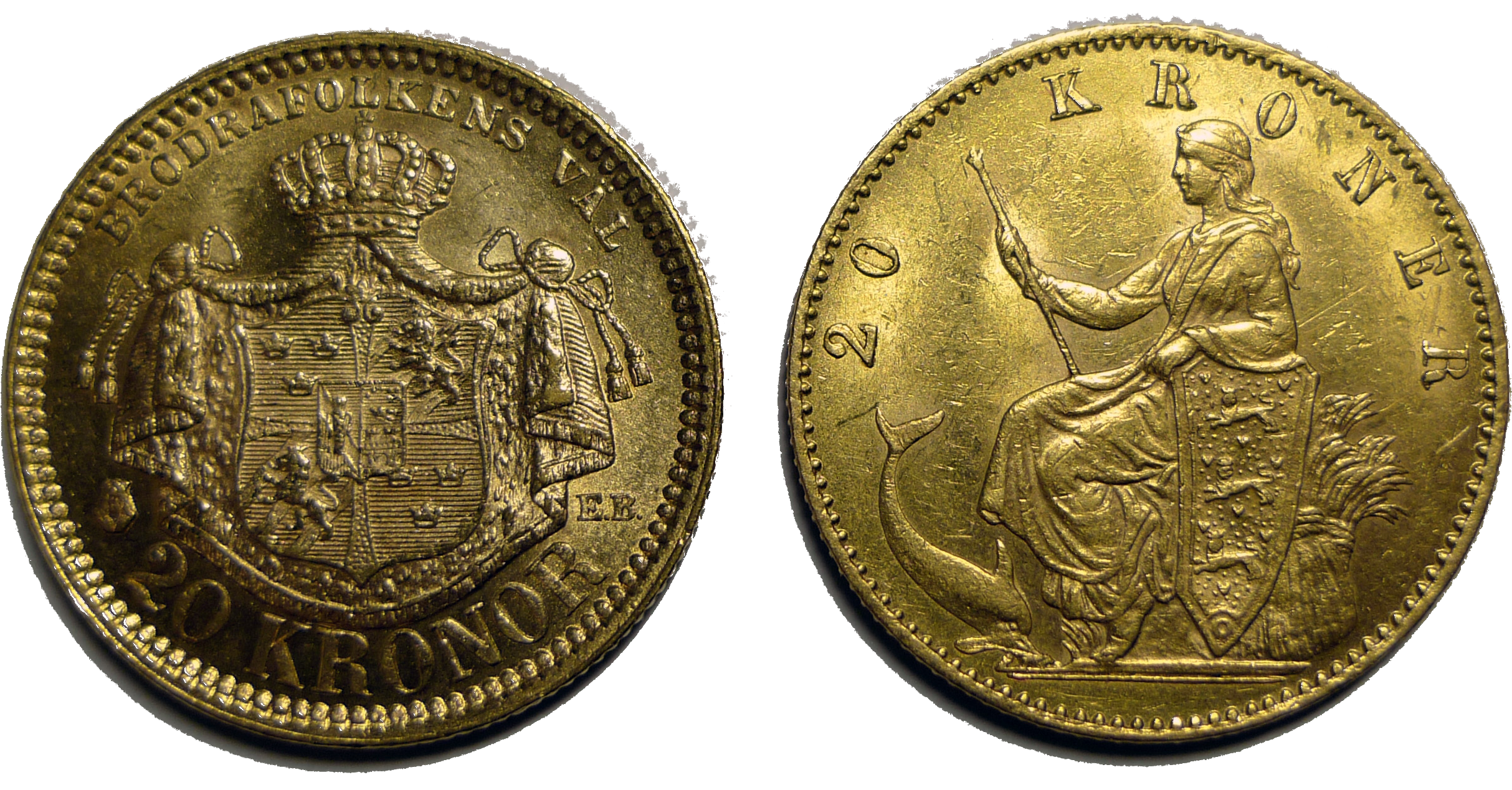
Two golden 20 kr coins from the Scandinavian Monetary Union, which was based on a gold standard. The coin to the left is Swedish and the right one is Danish.

The Scandinavian Monetary Union, a monetary union formed by Sweden and Denmark on 5 May 1873, fixed both their currencies against gold at par to each other. Norway, governed in union with Sweden, entered the monetary union two years later in 1875 by pegging its currency to gold at the same level as Denmark and Sweden (.403 gram). The monetary union proved one of the few tangible results of the Scandinavist political movement of the 19th century.

The union provided fixed exchange-rates and stability in monetary terms, but the member-countries continued to issue their own separate currencies. In an outcome not initially foreseen, the perceived security led to a situation where the formally separate currencies circulated on a basis of "as good as" the legal tender virtually throughout the entire area.

The outbreak of World War I in 1914 brought an end to the monetary union. Sweden abandoned the tie to gold on 2 August 1914, and without a fixed exchange rate the free circulation came to an end.

== 20th century ==
=== 1901–1939 ===
In the early decades of the 20th century the new Danish Social Liberal Party and the older Venstre Party shared government. During this time women gained the right to vote (1915), and the United States purchased some of Denmark's colonial holdings: the three islands of Saint John, Saint Croix, and Saint Thomas in the West Indies. The period also saw Denmark inaugurating important social and labour-market reforms, laying the basis for the present welfare state.

Denmark remained neutral during World War I, but the conflict affected the country to a considerable extent. As its economy was heavily based on exports, the unrestricted German submarine warfare was a serious problem. Denmark had to sell many of its exports to Germany instead of overseas nations. Widespread war profiteering took place, but commerce also suffered significant disruption because of the conflict and because of the ensuing financial instability in Europe. Rationing was instituted, and there were food and fuel shortages. In addition, Berlin forced Denmark to mine the Sound to prevent British ships from entering it. Following the defeat of Germany in the war (1918), the Treaty of Versailles (1919) mandated the Schleswig Plebiscites, which resulted in the return of Northern Schleswig (now South Jutland) to Denmark. The king and parts of the opposition grumbled that Prime Minister Carl Theodor Zahle (in office 1909–1910 and 1913–1920) did not use Germany's defeat to take back a bigger portion of the province, which Denmark had lost in the Second Schleswig War in 1864. The king and the opposition wanted to take over the city of Flensburg, while the cabinet insisted on only claiming areas where a majority of Danes lived, which led to a plebiscite in the affected areas over whether they wanted to become a part of Denmark or remain within Germany. Believing that he had the support of the people, King Christian X used his reserve power to dismiss Zahle's cabinet, sparking the Easter Crisis of 1920. As a result of the Easter Crisis, the king promised to no longer interfere in politics. Although the Danish Constitution was not amended at that time, Danish monarchs have stayed out of politics since then. The end of the war also prompted the Danish government to finish negotiating with Iceland, resulting in Iceland becoming a sovereign Kingdom on 1 December 1918 while retaining the Danish monarch as head of state.

In the 1924 Folketing election the Social Democrats, under the charismatic Thorvald Stauning, became Denmark's largest parliamentary political party, a position they maintained until 2001. Since the opposition still held a majority of the seats in the Landsting, Stauning had to co-operate with some of the right-wing parties, making the Social Democrats a more mainstream party. He succeeded in brokering an important deal in the 1930s which brought an end to the Great Depression in Denmark, and also laid the foundation for a welfare state.

Denmark joined the League of Nations in 1920 and during the interwar period was active in promoting peaceful solutions to international issues. With the rise of Adolf Hitler in Germany during the 1930s, the country found itself in a very precarious situation. Berlin refused to recognize its post-1920 border with Denmark, but the Nazi regime was preoccupied with more important matters and did not make any issue of it. The Danes tried unsuccessfully to obtain recognition of the border from their neighbor, but otherwise went out of their way to avoid antagonizing Germany.

=== Second World War ===
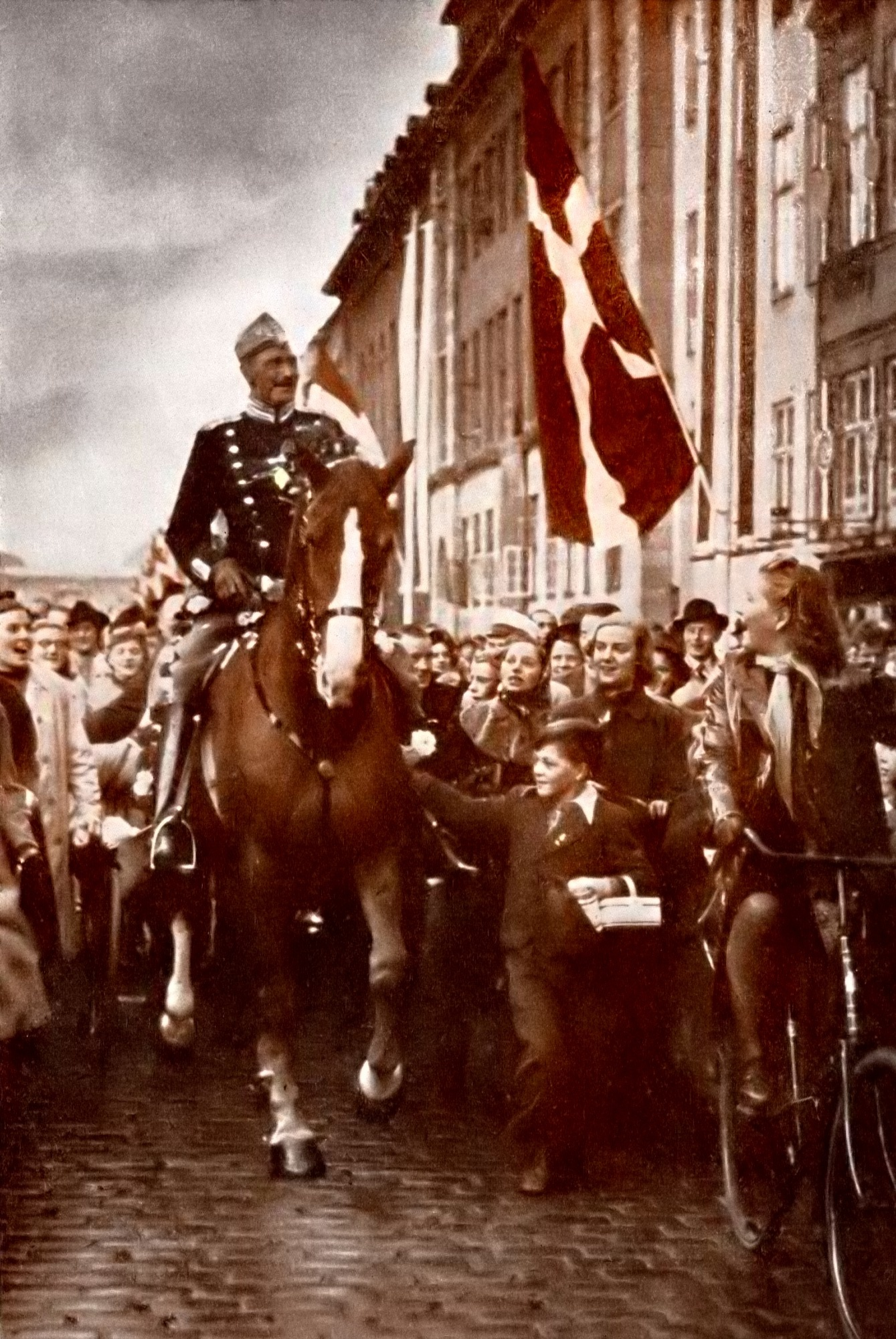
During the German occupation, King Christian X became a powerful symbol of national sovereignty. This image dates from the King's birthday, 26 September 1940.

In 1939, Hitler offered non-aggression pacts to the Scandinavian nations. While Sweden and Norway refused, Denmark readily accepted. When WWII began that fall, Copenhagen declared its neutrality. Nevertheless, Germany (so as to secure communications for its invasion of Norway) invaded and subsequently occupied Denmark on 9 April 1940, meeting limited resistance. British forces, however, occupied the Faroe Islands (12 April 1940) and invaded Iceland (10 May 1940) in pre-emptive moves to prevent German occupation. Following a plebiscite, Iceland declared its independence on 17 June 1944 and became a republic, dissolving its union with Denmark.

The Nazi occupation of Denmark unfolded in a unique manner. The Monarchy remained. The conditions of occupation started off very leniently (although the authorities banned Danmarks Kommunistiske Parti (the Communist party) when the Wehrmacht invaded the Soviet Union in June 1941), and Denmark retained its own government. The new coalition government tried to protect the population from Nazi rule through compromise. The Germans allowed the Folketing to remain in session. Despite deportations of nearly 2,000 of its members, the police remained largely under Danish control, and the German authorities stayed one step removed from the population. However, the Nazi demands eventually became intolerable for the Danish government, so, in 1943, it resigned and Germany assumed full control of Denmark. From that point, an armed resistance movement grew against the occupying forces. Towards the end of the war, Denmark grew increasingly difficult for Germany to control, but the country remained under occupation until near the end of the war. On 4 May 1945, German forces in Denmark, North West Germany, and the Netherlands surrendered to the Allies. On 5 May 1945, British troops liberated Copenhagen. Three days later, the war ended.

Denmark succeeded in smuggling most of its Jewish population to Sweden, in 1943, when the Nazis threatened deportation; see Rescue of the Danish Jews. Danish doctors refused to treat German citizens fleeing from Germany. More than 13,000 died in 1945 from various causes, among them some 7,000 children under five.

=== Post-war ===
In 1948, Denmark granted home rule to the Faroe Islands. 1953 saw further political reform in Denmark, abolishing the Landsting (the elected upper house), colonial status for Greenland and allowing female rights of succession to the throne with the signing of a new constitution.

The post-war years were marked by rising levels of personal prosperity, which found expression in increased household possession of various consumer goods. In 1977, for example, 69.5% of households had a car, 63% a washing machine, 98% a vacuum cleaner, 66% a food mixer, 95% a television, 56% a cassette recorder, 75% a still camera, and 90% a transistor radio, while in 1976 13% of households had a radio recorder, 56% a tape recorder, and 55% a record player.

Although not one of the war-time United Nations, Denmark succeeded in obtaining a (belated) invitation to the UN Charter conference, and became a founding member of the United Nations organisation in 1945. With the Soviet occupation of Bornholm, the emergence of what evolved to become the Cold War and with the lessons of World War II still fresh in Danish minds, the country abandoned its former policy of neutrality and became one of the original founding members of the North Atlantic Treaty Organisation (NATO) in 1949. Denmark had originally tried to form an alliance with Norway and Sweden only, but this attempt had failed. A Nordic Council later emerged however, with the aim of co-ordinating Nordic policies. Later on, in a referendum in 1972, Danes voted in favour of joining the European Community, the predecessor of the European Union, and Denmark became a member on 1 January 1973. Since then, Denmark has proven a hesitant member of the European community, opting out of many proposals, including the Euro, which the country rejected in a referendum in 2000.

== 21st century ==
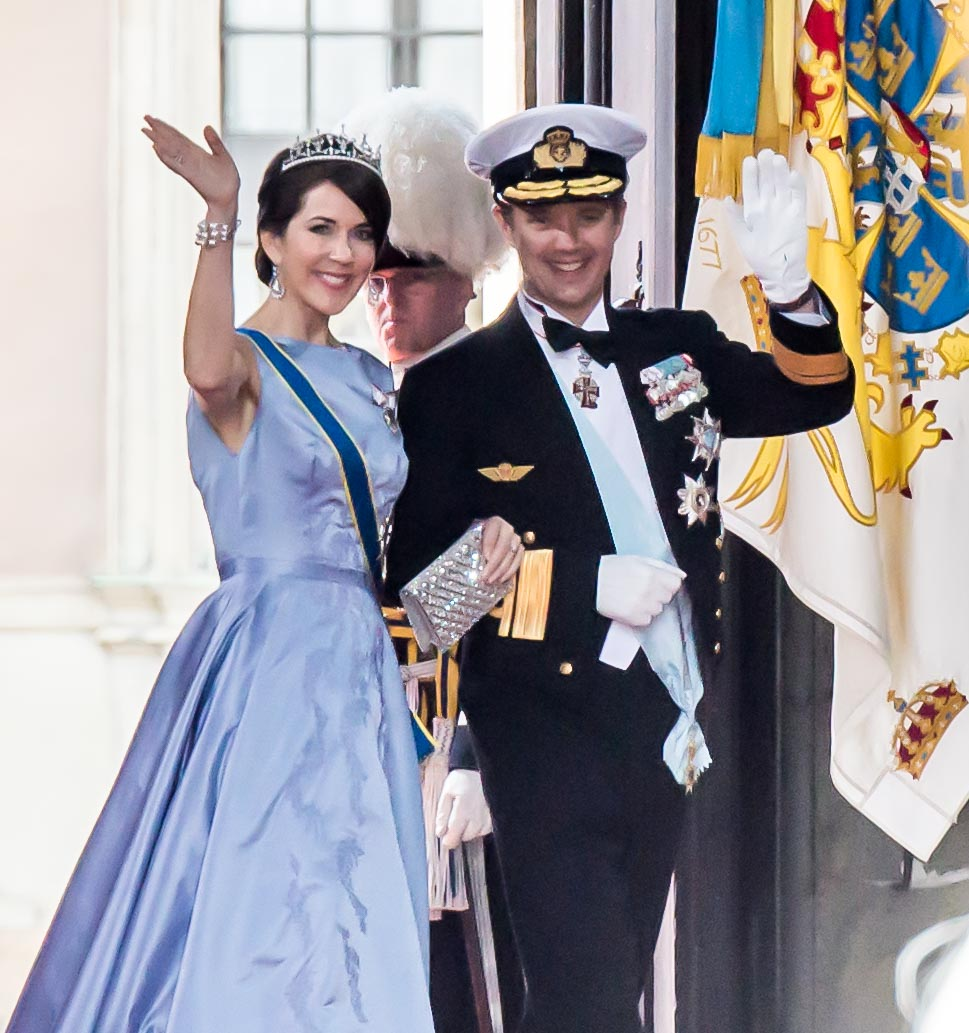
Then-Crown Prince Frederik with his wife then-Crown Princess Mary in 2015.

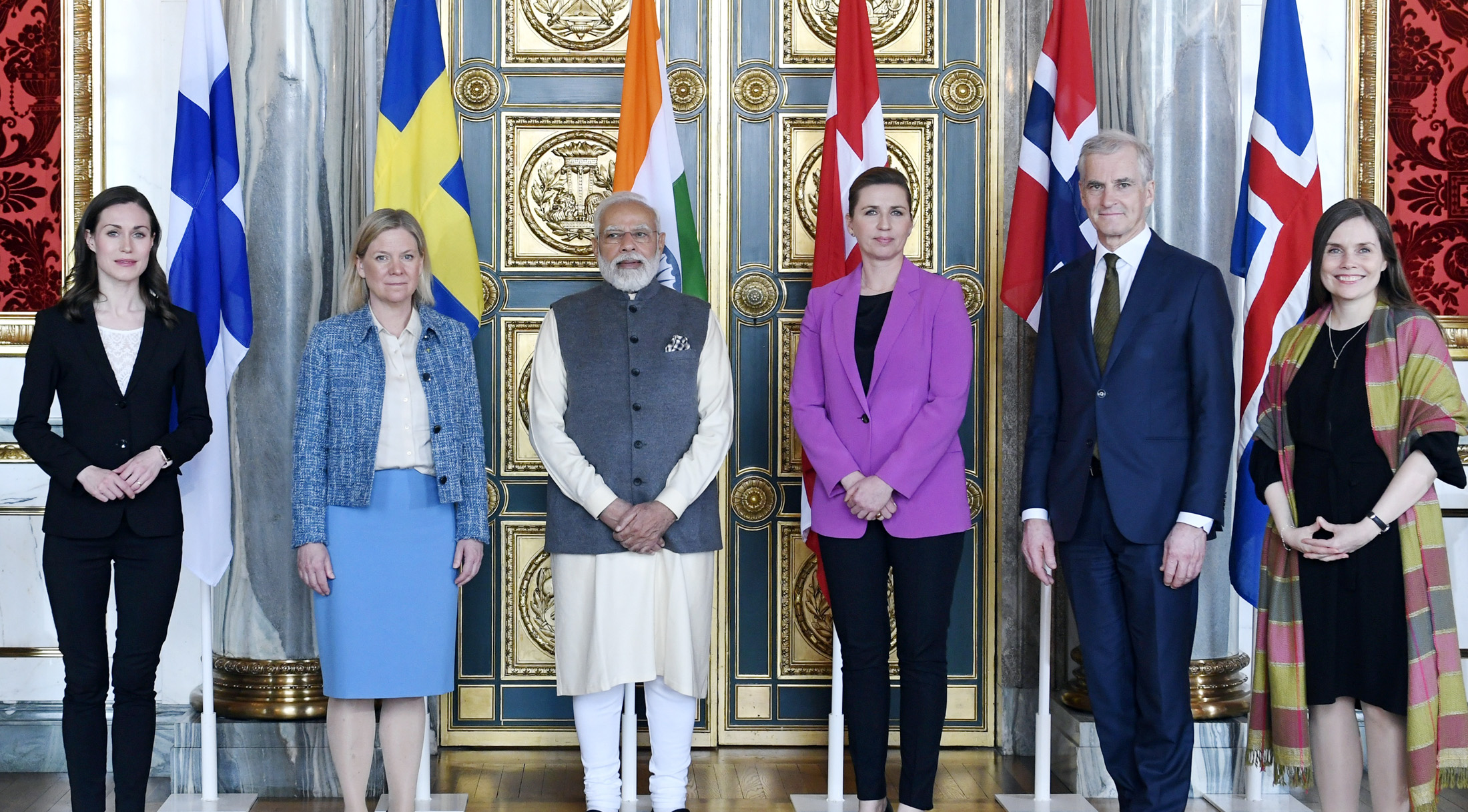
Indian Prime Minister Narendra Modi and 5 Nordic Prime Ministers (Sanna Marin of Finland, Magdalena Andersson of Sweden, Mette Frederiksen of Denmark, Jonas Gahr Støre of Norway, and Katrín Jakobsdóttir of Iceland) at 2nd India-Nordic Summit, in Copenhagen, 4 May 2022.

Denmark went through some of its most serious post-war crises in the early 21st century, such as SARS outbreak in 2003, Indian Ocean tsunami in December 2004, Jyllands-Posten Muhammad cartoons controversy in 2005, Great Recession and Danish embassy bombing in Islamabad in 2008, Copenhagen attacks in 2015, and with COVID-19 pandemic in between January 2020 and March 2022, which further met with national and international acclaim.

In 2001 following 9/11 terror attacks in the United States of America, Folketing agreed to entered the War in Afghanistan (2001–2021). A total of 43 Danish soldiers were killed in Afghanistan since the first deployment in 2002.

Venstre leader Anders Fogh Rasmussen won the 2001, 2005, and 2007 Folketing elections and formed a new government and was in his first few months challenged after the Social Democrat prime minister Poul Nyrup Rasmussen admitted defeat. Eight years later, he resigned from his office in April 2009 due to upcoming as the NATO Secretary-General, and then Lars Løkke Rasmussen was sworn in as prime minister in his first term from 2009 to 2011.

In 2011 Folketing elections, incumbent centre-right coalition led by Venstre lost power to a centre-left coalition led by the Social Democrats, making Helle Thorning-Schmidt the country's first female prime minister. The Social Liberal Party and the Socialist People's Party became part of the three-party government. The new parliament convened on 4 October 2011.

In 2015, Lars Løkke Rasmussen won the Folketing election and formed a government for the second time. Although the ruling Social Democrats became the largest party in the Folketing and increased their seat count, the opposition Venstre party was able to form a minority government headed by Lars Løkke Rasmussen with the support of the Danish People's Party, the Liberal Alliance and the Conservative People's Party. Prime Minister Lars Løkke Rasmussen held the office between 2009 and 2011, and again between 2015 and 2019, with backing from the Danish People's Party (DF).

In the 2019 Folketing election, comprising parties that supported the Social Democrats' leader Mette Frederiksen as candidate for Prime Minister. The "red bloc", consisting of the Social Democrats, the Social Liberals, Socialist People's Party, the Red–Green Alliance, the Faroese Social Democratic Party and the Greenlandic Siumut, won 93 of the 179 seats, securing a parliamentary majority. Meanwhile, the incumbent governing coalition, consisting of Venstre, the Liberal Alliance and the Conservative People's Party was reduced to 76 seats (including the Venstre-affiliated Union Party in the Faroe Islands) despite receiving external parliamentary support from the Danish People's Party and Nunatta Qitornai. Following 2019 general election the Social Democrats, led by leader Mette Frederiksen, formed a single-party government with support from the left-wing coalition. Frederiksen became prime minister on 27 June 2019.

In November 2022 snap general election, Prime Minister Mette Frederiksen's Social Democrats remained the biggest party with two more seats, its best result in two decades. The second biggest was the Liberal Party (Venstre), led by Jakob Ellemann-Jensen. The recently formed Moderates party, led by two-time former Prime Minister Lars Løkke Rasmussen, became the third-biggest party in Denmark. In December 2022, Prime Minister Mette Frederiksen formed a new coalition government with her Social Democrats and the Liberal Party and the Moderates party. Jakob Ellemann-Jensen became deputy prime minister and defence minister while Lars Løkke Rasmussen was appointed foreign minister.

In her 52nd New Year's speech on the last day of 2023, Queen Margrethe II announced her abdication of the Danish throne in favor of her son, Frederick. This was the first willing abdication of a Danish monarch since Eric III in 1146. On 14 January, 52 years to the day after Margrethe ascended the throne, Frederik X was proclaimed king of Denmark.

== See also ==
- List of Danish monarchs
  - Danish monarchs' family tree
- List of Danish chronicles
- History of Christianity in Denmark
- Politics of Denmark
- Timeline of Danish history
- Politics of the Faroe Islands
- Politics of Greenland
