= Christiern Pedersen =

Christiern Pedersen (c. 1480 – 16 January 1554) was a Danish canon, humanist scholar, writer, printer and publisher.

== Education ==
Christiern Pedersen was born in Helsingør, Denmark. He was schooled in Roskilde and studied from 1496 at the University of Greifswald. He received a baccalaureate degree in 1498 and from 1505 was a canon at Lund Cathedral.

He studied at the University of Paris from 1508 to 1515, where in 1511 he received a Master of Arts degree. During his stay in Paris he developed an interest in writing, translating and publishing. At that time Paris was the undisputed capital of the still-new printing press. While considering writing a new Latin-Danish lexicon, he wrote a replacement for the 300-year-old Latin grammar, Doctrinale, written in 1199 by Alexander of Villedieu, and still used as standard in the schools of Denmark at that time. In 1510 he published his new Latin-Danish lexicon, called Vocabularium ad usum Dacorum.

== Gesta Danorum ==
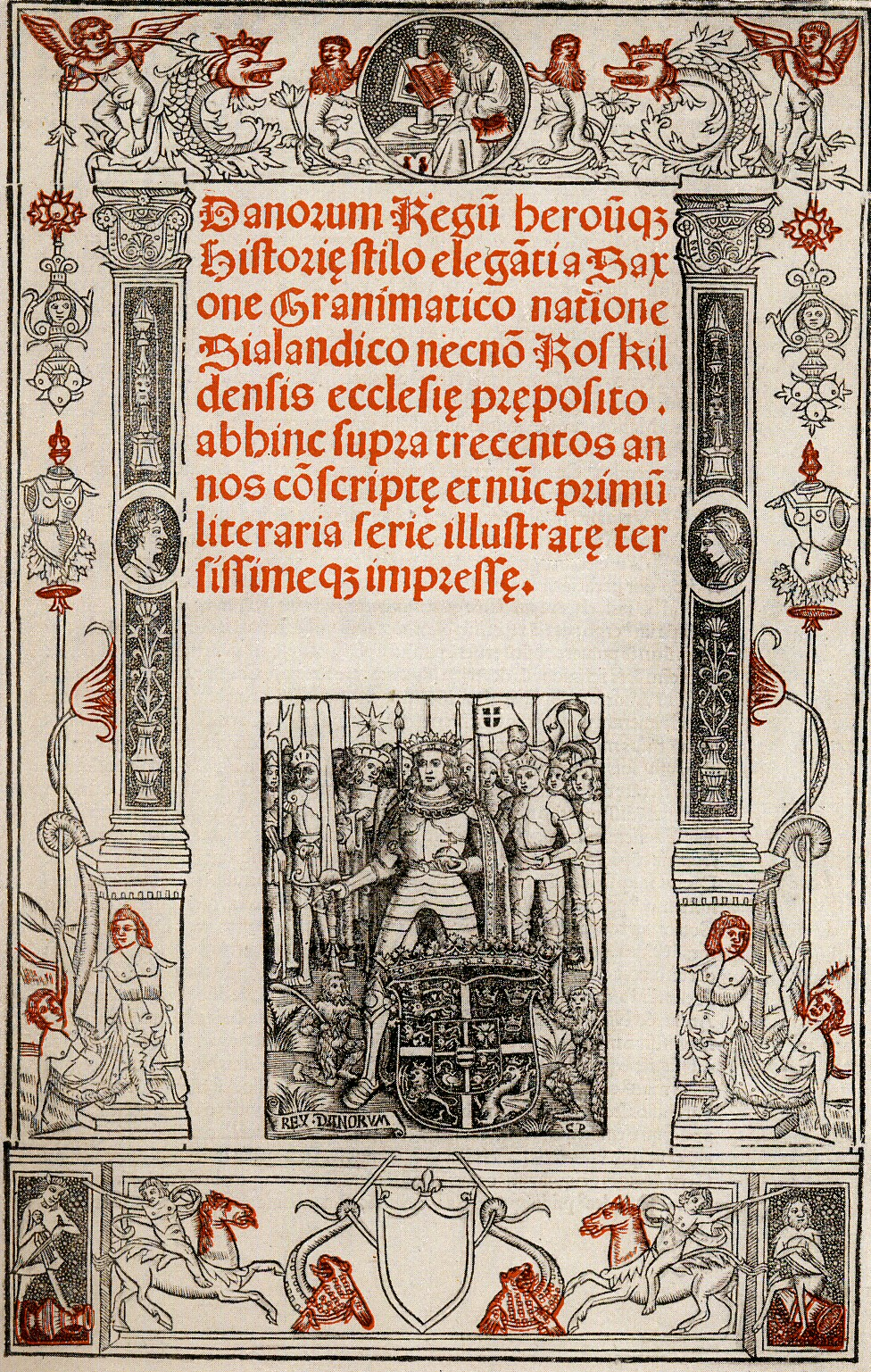
Title page of Danorum Regum heroumque Historiae, Paris 1514

He wanted to publish the huge 300-year-old chronicle of Denmark, Gesta Danorum, written by Saxo Grammaticus, but he had difficulty in gaining access to a manuscript of the work. At that time the most knowledge of this work came from a summary called Compendium Saxonis located in Chronica Jutensis, dated about 1342. Undoubtedly this is also how Pedersen knew of it.

Pedersen began to send letters to friends all over Denmark, trying to locate a manuscript, but they either did not have one or did not want to release it to him. He finally travelled to Denmark to search through libraries and monasteries, but still could not find one. Unexpectedly a letter arrived from Archbishop Birger Gunnersen of Lund stating that he had found a copy in his district and it would be made available to Pedersen.

With the help of Jodocus Badius Ascensius (also known as Jodocus Van Asche Badius), whose relationship with Pedersen had now grown to more than just a professional one, they published this first edition, editio princeps, of the Gesta Danorum, titled Danorum Regum heroumque Historiae, 15 March 1514, in Paris. This is today the oldest known complete copy of Saxo’s Gesta Danorum.

== The later years ==
In 1516, Pedersen returned to Lund and worked for Archbishop Birger Gunnersen. In 1522, he became Kanzler under the new archbishop, Johann Wess. However, during the reign of the next archbishop, Aage Sparre, Pedersen was accused of treason, among other things, resulting in Pedersen leaving for Germany. As he was loyal to King Christian II, he followed him in exile to the Netherlands in 1526, after meeting him in Berlin, where he spent the next five years in the then-Dutch city of Lier.

In 1529, he renounced his Catholicism (and his canon status) and became Lutheran. Consequently, Margaret of Austria, Regent of the Low Countries asked Christian II to dismiss him, but the exiled king ignored her request.

He did not return to Denmark before 1532, and got permission to settle in Malmø, where he opened a printing press shop. His continued loyalty towards King Christian II gained him no friends among the nobility, and it did not get better when later he actively participated in the Civil War (Grevens Fejde) on the losers' side.

He married Else Jacobsdatter in 1534 in Malmø, who died during childbirth in 1539. Pedersen sold his printing press shop and moved to Copenhagen in 1541. During these years he translated the Bible to Danish. This was to become his life's work, which sometimes earns him the title "the father of Danish literature". Finished in 1543, but first published in 1550, this work, Biblia, was not only a masterpiece of translation, but also technically excellent, with good-quality graphics and woodcuts. This is the first complete Danish Bible translation. 3000 copies were printed by Ludwig Dietz.

Pedersen was ill during the last 10 years of his life, but he continued to work until his death in 1554, while he was living with relatives in Helsinge.

== Publications ==
Pedersen's notable works include:

- 1510, Vocabularium ad usum Dacorum (A Latin-to-Danish Lexicon)
- 1514, Danorum Regum heroumque Historiae (publishing of Saxo's Gesta Danorum)
- 1515, "Jærtegnspostil"
- 1529, "Det Ny Testamente" (A translation of the New Testament)
- 1533, "Nøttelig Legebog faar Fattige och Rige Unge och Gamle" (A medical book)
- 1534, "Karl Magnus Krønike" (A free re-write of Charlemagne legends)
- 1534, "Kong Holger Danskes Krønike" (A free re-write based on the French 15th century 'Ogier le Dannoys')
- 1550, "Biblia - Christian d.3.s Bibel" (Translation of the Bible,- this is the first complete Danish Bible translation)

Additionally, a revised edition of the Danish "Rimkrøniken" and a Danish translation of Saxo’s "Gesta Danorum" were produced. It was never published and was lost in the library fire at Copenhagen University in 1728.

He published and/or wrote many other smaller works.
