= Gesta Danorum =

12th-century work of Danish history

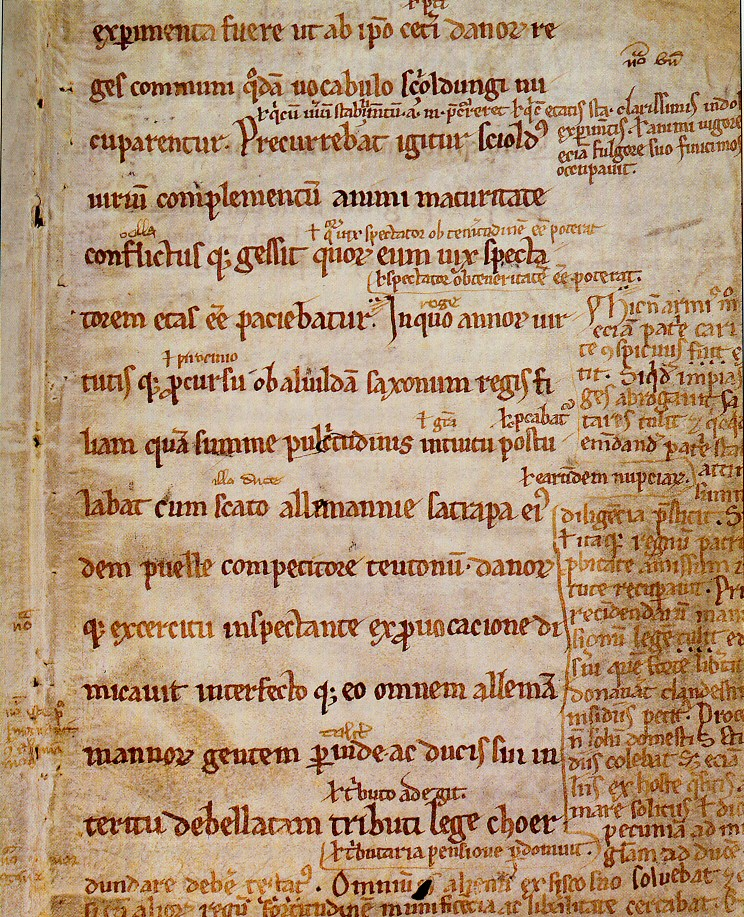
Gesta Danorum (Angers Fragment), page 1, front

Gesta Danorum ("Deeds of the Danes") is a patriotic work of Danish history, by the 12th-century author Saxo Grammaticus ("Saxo the Grammarian"). It is the most ambitious literary undertaking of medieval Denmark and is an essential source for the nation's early history. It is also one of the oldest known written documents about the history of Estonia and Latvia.

Consisting of sixteen books written in Latin on the invitation of Archbishop Absalon, Gesta Danorum describes Danish history and to some degree Scandinavian history in general, from prehistory to the late 12th century. In addition, Gesta Danorum offers singular reflections on European affairs in the High Middle Ages from a unique Scandinavian perspective, supplementing what has been handed down by historians from Western and Southern Europe.

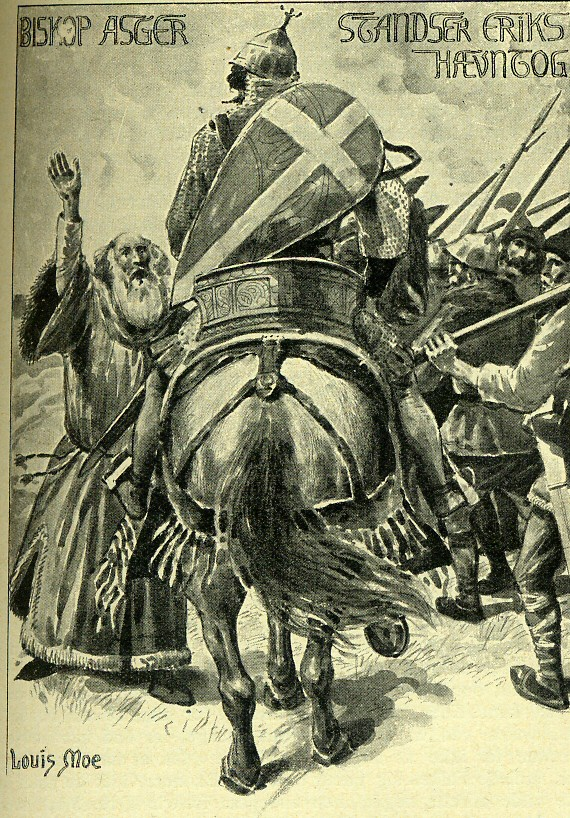
Bishop Ansgar, etching by the Danish-Norwegian illustrator Louis Moe (1857–1945)

== Books ==
The sixteen books, in prose with an occasional excursion into poetry, can be categorized into two parts: Books 1–9, which deal with Norse mythology and stories of legendary, or semi-legendary, Danish kings, ending with Gorm the Old; and Books 10–16, which deal with medieval history. The last three books (14–16), which describe Danish conquests on the south shore of the Baltic Sea and wars against Slavic peoples (the Northern Crusades), are very valuable for the history of West Slavic tribes (Polabian Slavs, Pomeranians) and Slavic paganism. Book 14 contains a unique description of the temple on the island of Rügen.

=== Book 1 ===
The first book is mostly Saxo's original work, sharing little with other primary works, but taking some inspiration from Ancient Greek epics. It very briefly covers the rule of the eponymous founder of the Danish nation, Dan, but also his brother Angul, his sons Humblus and Lotherus, and Dan's grandson, Skioldus, whose son Gram is the first Danish king to be given some detail: his reign revolves around conquering Sweden and Finland, only to die in a battle.

Most of the book deals with the adventures of Hadingus, the son of Gram and Finnish princess, Signe. Here the adventure concerns the loss of Denmark to the Swedes as well as Hadingus's attempts to reclaim it with the help of giants and Odin. The book concludes with Hadingus's suicide after hearing of his friend's death.

Kings featured in Book 1 are:

- Dan I
- Humblus
- Lotherus
- Skioldus
- Gram
- Svibdagerus
- Guthormus
- Hadingus

=== Book 2 ===
Book 2 is split into two halves. The first half primarily follows adventures of Hadingus's son, Frotho, who perform cunning raids across the Baltic Sea and far as England, while encountering many supernatural events and being forced to solve disputes via single combat.

The second half of the Book includes the stories of kings Haldanus, Helgo, Roe and Rolvo Krake, which are also told in Hrólfs saga kraka. These kings also appear in other sources such as the Old English Beowulf (under the names Healfdene, Halga, Hroðgar, and Hroðulf).

Kings featured in Book 2 are:

- Frotho I
- Haldanus I
- Roe
- Helgo
- Rolvo Krake
- Hiarwarthus (king for less than a single day)

=== Book 3 ===
Book 3 begins with Saxo's version of the death of the Norse god Baldr. In this version, Hotherus is a Swedish prince in love with a woman named Nanna, and Balderus is a son of Odin (Norse gods are described in Gesta Danorum as magicians who were merely believed to be gods) who desires Nanna for himself, leading to extended conflict between them. After defeating the army of the gods and slaying Balderus, Hotherus becomes King in Denmark after the deaths of Rolvo Krake and his usurper Hiartuar. Later, Odin rapes a Ruthenian princess named Rinda, begetting the son Bous. For this crime, Odin was temporarily exiled from Byzantium (where the euhemerised Aesir were believed to rule) and replaced by Ollerus. When Odin returned to power ten years later, he incited Bous to declare war on Hotherus in revenge for the death of Balderus.

The second half of the book introduces Amleth, as a grandson of the Danish king Rørikus. Amleth's father was murdered by his uncle, the governor of Jylland. Amleth pretends to be a fool in fear of his uncle who has married his mother. He is sent to Britain by his uncle to be put to death, but secretly rewrites the death warrant and instead marries the daughter of the king. Then he returns to Denmark and kills his uncle. This story was later told by Shakespeare as Hamlet.

Kings featured in Book 3 are:

- Høtherus (and Balderus)
- Rørikus (the grandfather of Hamlet)

=== Book 4 ===
Book 4 concludes the tale of Amleth. After killing his uncle and securing the support of his people in doing so, Amleth returns to Britain. His father-in-law sends him to woo (on the King's behalf) the Scottish Queen Hermutrude, who is famous for murdering all her suitors. However, Hermutrude refuses to marry the King and instead marries Amleth, making the King into Amleth's enemy. Amleth is killed by the new King of Denmark, Wiglecus, who then marries Hermutrude.

Many subsequent kings follow, including Wiglecus, Wermundus, and Uffo, who are known to us from the Anglo-Saxon royal genealogies as three legendary Kings of the Angles (Wihtlæg, Wermund, and Offa).

Kings featured in Book 4 are:

- Wiglecus
- Wermundus
- Uffo
- Dan II
- Huglecus
- Frotho II
- Dan III
- Fridlevus I

=== Book 5 ===
Book 5 covers the life of just a single king, Frotho III, and focuses on his empire-building and the exploits of his brilliant Norwegian advisor, Erick the Eloquent (later King of Sweden). Ultimately Frotho ends up ruling over Britain, Scandinavia, the Slavs, and the Huns. Other tales from Norse legend are included in this book, within Frotho's lifetime, including the story of Hedin and Hogni and the story of Hialmar and Arrow-Odd. Saxo says that it was during Frotho's reign that Jesus came to Earth, and there was uninterrupted peace around the world. Frotho is eventually killed by a sorceress in the form of a sea-cow.

=== Book 6 ===
In Book 6, the poet Hiarnus is given the crown after the death of Frotho III because of the great song of praise he wrote for Frotho. Frotho's son, Fridlevus II, returns and takes the kingship from Hiarnus, then goes on many adventures. Fridlevus' son Frotho IV, named for his grandfather, is a generous and beloved king, and skilled in war from the age of twelve, but is eventually slain by the treacherous Suertingus. Frotho is followed by Ingellus, who is unlike his father and whose court becomes decadent under the influence of the sons of Suertingus.

Book 6 also introduces and follows the adventures of the legendary hero, Starcatherus, who after surviving a shipwreck was taken in at the court of Frotho IV and exceedingly well treated, before leaving to become a viking. Tales told of Starcatherus include his slaying of King Wicarus, and his attack on the Irish king Huglecus in the fleet of the pirate king Hako.

When Starcatherus returns to Denmark, he is disappointed in the decadent ways of Ingellus, and incites the king to slay the sons of Suertingus.

This story, of three kings named Friðleifr (Fridlevus), his son Froði (Frotho) and his son Ingjaldr (Ingellus) appear in other sources of Germanic legend, such as Chronicon Lethrense, Brevis historia regum Dacie, and several genealogies. Starcatherus inciting Ingellus to revenge against the sons of Suertingus echoes the old warrior in Beowulf who incites the Heaðobard king Ingeld to renew his conflict with the Danes. The death of Vikar (Wicarus) is told in Gautreks saga and the battle of Haki (Hako) and Hugleik (Huglecus) is told in Ynglinga saga.

Kings featured in Book 6 are:

- Hiarnus
- Fridlevus II
- Frotho IV
- Ingellus

=== Book 7 ===
Book 7 tells of the last of the royal descendants of the original kings, beginning with Olavus I and ending with Haldanus II Biargrammus. On his deathbed, Haldanus II he wills his sovereignty to the unrelated Unguinus, King of the Geats, whose descendants become the new royal family. Conflict between Sygarus, grandson of Unguinus, and the sons of Hamundus leads to the near destruction of this second royal family also and the fracturing of the Danish state, which is eventually reunified by Sygarus's great-grandson Harald Wartooth.

Also included in Book 7 is a collection of short love stories, including the tales of Alf and Alfhild (Alf is here presented as a son of Sygarus) and Hagbard and Signy (Signy being a daughter of Sygarus, and Hagbard a son of Hamundus). Several of these short tales feature shieldmaidens.

Kings featured in Book 7 are:

- Olavus I
- Frotho V
- Haraldus I
- Haldanus II Biargrammus
- Haraldus II
- Unguinus
- Sywaldus I
- Sygarus
- Sywaldus II
- Haldanus III
- Haraldus III Hyldetan (Harald Wartooth)

=== Book 8 ===
Covers the famous Battle of Brávellir, between Harald Wartooth and Ringo. The Book covers the lives of the kings following this battle, including how Starcatherus slew king Olo and afterwards died in the reign of Olo's son Omundus as a result.

During the reign of Gormo I, the hero Thorkillus leads two journeys beyond the known world: one via Biarmia to the home of Geruthus, a giant killed long ago by Thor; and one to the place where Utgarthilocus is bound in heavy chains. When Thorkillus returns home from his journeys, he discovers that Germany has been Christianised.

The Book concludes with Danish involvement in the Saxon Wars against the Frankish King Karolus (Charlemagne) in the reign of Gormo's son, Gotricus.

Kings featured in Book 8 are:

- Haraldus III Hyldetan (Harald Wartooth)
- Ringo
- Olo
- Omundus
- Sywardus I
- Buthlus
- Iarmericus
- Broderus
- Sywaldus III
- Snio
- Biorn
- Haraldus III
- Gormo I
- Gotricus

=== Book 9 ===
The book deals with Ragnar Lothbrok and his rising empire, he appoints many of his sons to govern parts of his empire all the way from Scotland to Scythia.

Kings featured in Book 9 are:

- Olavus II
- Hemmingus
- Siwardus Ring
- Regner Lothbrog
- Siwardus III
- Ericus I
- Ericus II
- Kanutus I
- Frotho VI
- Gormo II
- Haraldus III
- Gormo III

The family tree of legendary Kings of the Danes, according to the Gesta Danorum (Books 1 to 9)

Kings of the Danes are marked with a crown (♕). Kings of the Swedes are marked with a dagger (†). Superscript numbers after a name indicate in which books of Gesta Danorum the individual is mentioned.

Humblus ♂ ^{(1)}
KEY
Angul ♂ ^{(1)}	♕ Dan I ♂ ^{(1)}	Grytha ♀ ^{(1)}	Marriage or coupling
Parent and child
The Angles	♕ Humblus ♂ ^{(1)}	♕ Lotherus ♂ ^{(1)}	King of the Saxons ♂ ^{(1)}	Succession by other or unclear means
Roarus ♂ ^{(1)}
Sigtrugus, King of the Swedes† ♂ ^{(1)}	♕ Skioldus ♂ ^{(1)}	Alvilda ♀ ^{(1)}
daughter of Roarus ♀ ^{(1)}	Bessus ♂ ^{(1)}
sister of Gram ♀ ^{(1)}	Gro ♀ ^{(1)}	♕ Gram† ♂ ^{(1)}	Sumblus, King of the Finns ♂ ^{(1)}
Wagnofthus ♂ ^{(1)}
Signe ♀ ^{(1)}	Henricus, King of the Saxons ♂ ^{(1)}	Haquinus, King of the Nitherians ♂ ^{(1)}
Harthgrepa ♀ ^{(1)}
♕Suibdagerus, King of Norway† ♂ ^{(1)}	sister of Guthormus ♀ ^{(1)}	♕Guthormus ♂ ^{(1)}	♕Hadingus ♂ ^{(1,2,4,5)}	Regnilda ♀ ^{(1)}
Asmundus† ♂ ^{(1)}	Gunnilda ♀ ^{(1)}	Guthormus ♂ ^{(1)}
Ulvilda ♀ ^{(1,2)}	♕ Ubbo ♂ ^{(2)}
Henricus ♂ ^{(1)}	Uffo† ♂ ^{(1)}	Hundingus† ♂ ^{(1,2)}	Thorilda ♀ ^{(2)}	Scottus ♂ ^{(2)}
daughter of Uffo ♀ ^{(1)}	Regnerus† ♂ ^{(2)}	Suanhuita ♀ ^{(2)}	sisters of Suanhuita ♀♀ ^{(2)}	Andwan, King of the Hellespont ♂ ^{(2)}
Thoraldus ♂ ^{(2)}
♕ Frotho I ♂ ^{(2,5)}	daughter of Andwan ♀ ^{(2)}
Hothbrodus† ♂ ^{(2,3)}	♕ Haldanus I ♂ ^{(2)}	Roe ♂ ^{(2)}	Skato ♂ ^{(2)}
Thora ♀ ^{(2)}
♕ Helgo ♂ ^{(2,3)}	♕ Roe ♂ ^{(2)}
Athislus† ♂ ^{(2,3)}	Ursa ♀ ^{(2)}
King Gevarus ♂ ^{(2,3)}	♕ Rolvo Krake† ♂ ^{(2,3)}	Ruta ♀ ^{(2)}	Biarco ♂ ^{(2)}	Sculda ♀ ^{(2)}	♕Hiarwarthus † ♂ ^{(2,3)}
♕ Hotherus† ♂ ^{(2,3)}	Nanna ♀ ^{(3)}	Herlecus ♂ ^{(3)}	Gericus ♂ ^{(3)}
former King of Britain ♂ ^{(3)}	mother of the King of Britain ♀ ^{(3)}	a slave ♂ ^{(3)}	a bondmaid ♀ ^{(3)}	♕ Roricus Slyngebond ♂ ^{(3)}	Gerwendillus ♂ ^{(3)}
King of Britain ♂ ^{(3,4)}	Queen of Britain ♀ ^{(3,4)}	Gerutha ♀ ^{(3,4)}	Horwendillus ♂ ^{(3,4)}	Fengo ♂ ^{(3,4)}
foster sister of Amlethus ♀ ^{(3,4)}	daughter of the King of Britain ♀ ^{(3,4)}	Amlethus ♂ ^{(3,4)}	Herminthruda, Queen of Scotland ♀ ^{(4)}	♕ Wiglecus ♂ ^{(4)}
son of Amlethus ♂ ^{(4)}	♕Wermundus ♂ ^{(4)}	Frowinus, governor of Sleswik ♂ ^{(4)}
♕ Uffo, or Olavus the Gentle ♂ ^{(4)}	daughter of Frowin ♀ ^{(4)}	Keto ♂ ^{(4)}	Wigo ♂ ^{(4)}
♕ Dan II ♂ ^{(4)}
♕ Huglecus ♂ ^{(4)}
♕ Frotho II, the Vigorous ♂ ^{(4)}
♕ Dan III ♂ ^{(4)}
Craca ♀ ^{(5)}	Regnerus ♂ ^{(5)}	Bracus ♂ ^{(5)}	♕ Fridlevus I, the Swift ♂ ^{(4,5)}	Hun, King of the Huns ♂ ^{(5)}	Hun ♂ ^{(5)}
Gøtarus, King of Norway ♂ ^{(5)}	Westmarus ♂ ^{(5)}	Colo ♂ ^{(5)}	Gøtwara ♀ ^{(5)}
Rollerus ♂ ^{(5)}	Ericus the Shrewd-spoken† ♂ ^{(5,6)}	Gunwara the Fair ♀ ^{(5)}	Alvilda ♀ ^{(5)}	♕ Frotho III ♂ ^{(5,6)}	Hanunda ♀ ^{(5)}	Grep (eldest of three) ♂ ^{(5)}	11 other sons (two named Grep) ♂♂ ^{(5)}
Hythin, King of Tellemark ♂ ^{(6)}	Alvo ♂ ^{(5)}	Ofura ♀ ^{(5)}	Arngrimus ♂ ^{(5)}	Grubbus ♂ ^{(6)}	♕ Hiarnus ♂ ^{(6)}	Amundus, King of Norway ♂ ^{(6)}
child of Hythin ^{(6)}	Haldanus† ♂ ^{(6)}	12 sons, including Angantir ♂♂ ^{(5)}	Ano ♂ ^{(6)}	Iuritha ♀ ^{(6)}	♕ Fridlevus II ♂ ^{(6)}	Frogertha ♀ ^{(6)}
Hanevus, King of Saxony ♂ ^{(6)}	Suertingus, King of Saxony ♂ ^{(6)}	Olavus ♂ ^{(6)}	♕ Frotho IV ♂ ^{(6)}
Sywardus† ♂ ^{(6,7)}	sons of Suertingus ♂♂ ^{(6)}	sister of the sons of Suertingus ♀ ^{(6)}	♕ Ingellus ♂ ^{(6,7)}	Helga ♀ ^{(6)}	Helgo ♂ ^{(6)}	Asa ♀ ^{(6)}
three sons that died in war ♂♂ ^{(7)}	♕ Olavus I ♂ ^{(7)}	Karolus, governor of Gothland ♂ ^{(7)}
Ulvilda ♀ ^{(7)}	♕ Frotho V ♂ ^{(7)}	Hatherus ♂ ^{(7)}	♕ Haraldus I ♂ ^{(7)}	Sygne ♀ ^{(7)}
Ericus† ♂ ^{(7)}	Thorhilda ♀ ^{(7)}	♕ Haldanus II Biargrammus† ♂ ^{(7)}	♕Haraldus II ♂ ^{(7)}
Ebbo ♂ ^{(7)}	mother of Otharus ♀ ^{(7)}	♕ Unguinus, King of the Goths ♂ ^{(7)}	Asmundus ♂ ^{(7)}
sister of Otharus ♀ ^{(7)}	♕ Sywaldus I ♂ ^{(7)}	Sygrutha ♀ ^{(7)}	Kings of Norway
Sywardus, King of the Goths ♂ ^{(7)}	mother of Alvilda ♀ ^{(7)}	Otharus ♂ ^{(7)}	Syritha ♀ ^{(7)}	♕ Sygarus ♂ ^{(7)}	queen of Sygarus ♀ ^{(7)}	Hamundus, a petty king ♂ ^{(7)}
Wemundus ♂ ^{(7)}	Ostenus ♂ ^{(7)}	♕Sywaldus II ♂ ^{(7)}	Algerus ♂ ^{(7)}	Helwin ♂ ^{(7)}	Hamundus ♂ ^{(7)}
Regnaldus, King of the Northmen ♂ ^{(7)}	Alvilda ♀ ^{(7)}	Alf ♂ ^{(7)}	Sygne ♂ ^{(7)}	Hagbarthus ♂ ^{(7)}	Hako ♂ ^{(7)}
Gro ♀ ^{(7)}	Borcarus ♂ ^{(7)}	Drota ♀ ^{(7)}	Gunnarus ♂ ^{(7)}	Hano, ruler of Funen ♂ ^{(7)}	Ostmarus, ruler of Scania ♂ ^{(7)}	Hundingus, ruler of Zealand ♂ ^{(7)}	Roricus, co-ruler of Jutland ♂ ^{(7)}	Hatherus, co-ruler of Jutland ♂ ^{(7)}
Haraldus ♂ ^{(7)}	Hildigerus ♂ ^{(7)}	Røtho, a Ruthenian pirate ♂ ^{(7)}	Wesetus ♂
♕Haldanus III ♂ ^{(7)}	Guritha ♀ ^{(7)}
Alverus† ♂ ^{(7,8)}	♕ Haraldus III Hyldetan ♂ ^{(7)}
Olavus ♂ ^{(7)}	Ingo ♂ ^{(7)}	Ingeldus† ♂ ^{(7)}	sister of Haraldus ♀ ^{(7)}	Ubbo ♂ ^{(7)}	sister of Haraldus ♀ ^{(7)}	Sywardus ♂ ^{(7)}	sister of Haraldus ♀ ^{(7)}	Olavus, king of the Werms ♂ ^{(7)}
♕ Ringo I† ♂ ^{(7,8)}	♕ Hetha ♀ ^{(8)}	♕ Olo the Vigorous ♂ ^{(7,8)}	Esa ♀ ^{(7)}	son of the king ♂ ^{(7,8)}
Atylo the Scanian ♂ ^{(8)}	Ringo, ruler of Norway ♂ ^{(8)}
Tola ♂ ^{(8)}	Omothus, or Homothus ♂ ^{(8)}	daughter of Ringo ♀ ^{(8)}	Esa ♀ ^{(8)}	♕ Omundus ♂ ^{(7,8)}
Sibbo ♂ ^{(8)}	sister of Gøtarus ♀ ^{(8)}	Gøtarus† ♂ ^{(8)}	daughter of Omundus ♀ ^{(8)}	♕ Sywardus I ♂ ^{(8)}	♕ Buthlus ♂ ^{(8)}	daughter of Omundus ♀ ^{(8)}
Ebbo ♂ ^{(8)}
early wife of Iarmericus ♀ ^{(8)}	♕Iarmericus † ♂ ^{(8)}	Suanilda ♀ ^{(8)}	the Hellepontines, 4 brothers ♂♂ ^{(8)}	Iarmericus' sister, sold to Norwegians ♀ ^{(8)}	Iarmericus' sister, sold to Germans ♀ ^{(8)}
♕ Broderus ♂ ^{(8)}	nephews of Iarmericus ♂♂ ^{(8)}
King of the Goths ♂ ^{(8)}	♕ Sywaldus III ♂ ^{(8)}
King of Sweden† ♂ ^{(8)}	daughter of the King of the Goths ♀ ^{(8)}	♕ Snio ♂ ^{(8)}
♕ Biorn ♂ ^{(8)}
♕ Haraldus III ♂ ^{(8)}
a queen from Sweden ♀ ^{(8)}	♕ Gormo I ♂ ^{(8)}
♕ Gotricus, or Godefridus ♂ ^{(8,9)}
♕ Olavus III ♂ ^{(9)}	daughter of Gotricus ♀ ^{(9)}	Sywardus, King of Norway ♂ ^{(9)}	unknown
♕Hemmingus ♂ ^{(9)}	♕Siwardus II Ring ♂ ^{(9)}	♕ Ringo II ♂ ^{(9)}	Herothus† ♂ ^{(9)}	Hesbernus ♂ ^{(9)}
ruler in Norway ♂ ^{(9)}	Lathgertha ♀ ^{(9)}	♕Regnerus Lothbrog ♂ ^{(9)}	Thora ♀ ^{(9)}
Suanlogha ♀ ^{(9)}	a woman ♀ ^{(9)}
2 daughters ♀♀ ^{(9)}	Fridlevus ♂ ^{(9)}	♕ Haraldus ♂ ^{(9)}	♕ Siwardus & Ericus ♂♂ ^{(9)}	Rathbarthus ♂ ^{(9)}	Dunwatus ♂ ^{(9)}	Ubbo ♂ ^{(9)}
Regnaldus ♂ ^{(9)}	Withsercus ♂ ^{(9)}	Ericus Wind-hat ♂ ^{(9)}	Guthormus ♂ ^{(9)}	♕ Ericus I ♂ ^{(9)}	♕ Sywardus Snake-Eye ♂ ^{(9)}	Biornus ♂ ^{(9)}	Agnerus ♂ ^{(9)}	Ivarus ♂ ^{(9)}
daughter of Guthormus ♀ ^{(9)}	♕ Ericus II ♂ ^{(9)}
♕ Kanutus I ♂ ^{(9)}
♕ Frotho VI ♂ ^{(9)}
♕ Gormo II the English ♂ ^{(9)}
♕ Haraldus V ♂ ^{(9)}	Hedelradus, King of England ♂ ^{(9)}
♕ Gormo III ♂ ^{(9)}	Thira ♀ ^{(9)}
Kanutus ♂ ^{(9)}	Haraldus VI ♂ ^{(9)}

Genealogical information is derived from Oliver Elton's 1905 translation, The First Nine Books of the Danish History of Saxo Grammaticus (via Wikisource). Name spellings are from the 1931 Latin critical edition by Olrik and Ræder (via Wikisource). Regnal numbers, which do not appear in the original text, are included for clarity and taken from the engraving Veræ effigies regum omnium by Erico Olai Tormio.

== History ==
=== Chronology ===
When exactly Gesta Danorum was written is the subject of numerous works; however, it is generally agreed that Gesta Danorum was not finished before 1208. The last event described in the last book (Book 16) is King Canute VI of Denmark subduing Pomerania under Duke Bogislaw I, in 1186. However, the preface of the work, dedicated to Archbishop Anders Sunesen, mentions the Danish conquest of the areas north of the Elbe in 1208.

Book 14, comprising nearly one-quarter of the text of the entire work, ends with Absalon's appointment to archbishop in 1178. Since this book is so large and Absalon has greater importance than King Valdemar I, this book may have been written first and comprised a work on its own. It is possible that Saxo then enlarged it with Books 15 and 16, telling the story of King Valdemar I's last years and King Canute VI's first years.

It is believed that Saxo then wrote Books 11, 12, and 13. Svend Aagesen's history of Denmark, Brevis historia regum Dacie (circa 1186), states that Saxo had decided to write about "The king-father and his sons," which would be King Sweyn Estridson, in Books 11, 12, and 13. He would later add the first ten books. This would also explain the 22 years between the last event described in the last book (Book 16) and the 1208 event described in the preface.

=== Manuscripts ===
The original manuscripts of the work are lost, except for four fragments: the Angers Fragment, Lassen Fragment, Kall-Rasmussen Fragment and Plesner Fragment. The Angers Fragment is the biggest fragment, and the only one attested to be in Saxo's own handwriting. The other ones are copies from c. 1275. All four fragments are in the collection of the Danish Royal Library in Copenhagen, Denmark.

The text has, however, survived. In 1510–1512, Christiern Pedersen, a Danish translator working in Paris, searched Denmark high and low for an existing copy of Saxo's works, which by that time was nearly all but lost. By that time most knowledge of Saxo's work came from a summary located in Chronica Jutensis, from around 1342, called Compendium Saxonis. It is also in this summary that the name Gesta Danorum is found. The title Saxo himself used for his work is unknown.

Christiern Pedersen finally found a copy in the collection of Archbishop Birger Gunnersen of Lund, Skåne (Skåne is now part of Sweden, but at the time was still part of Denmark), which he gladly lent him. With the help of printer Jodocus Badius, Gesta Danorum was refined and printed.

=== Printing ===
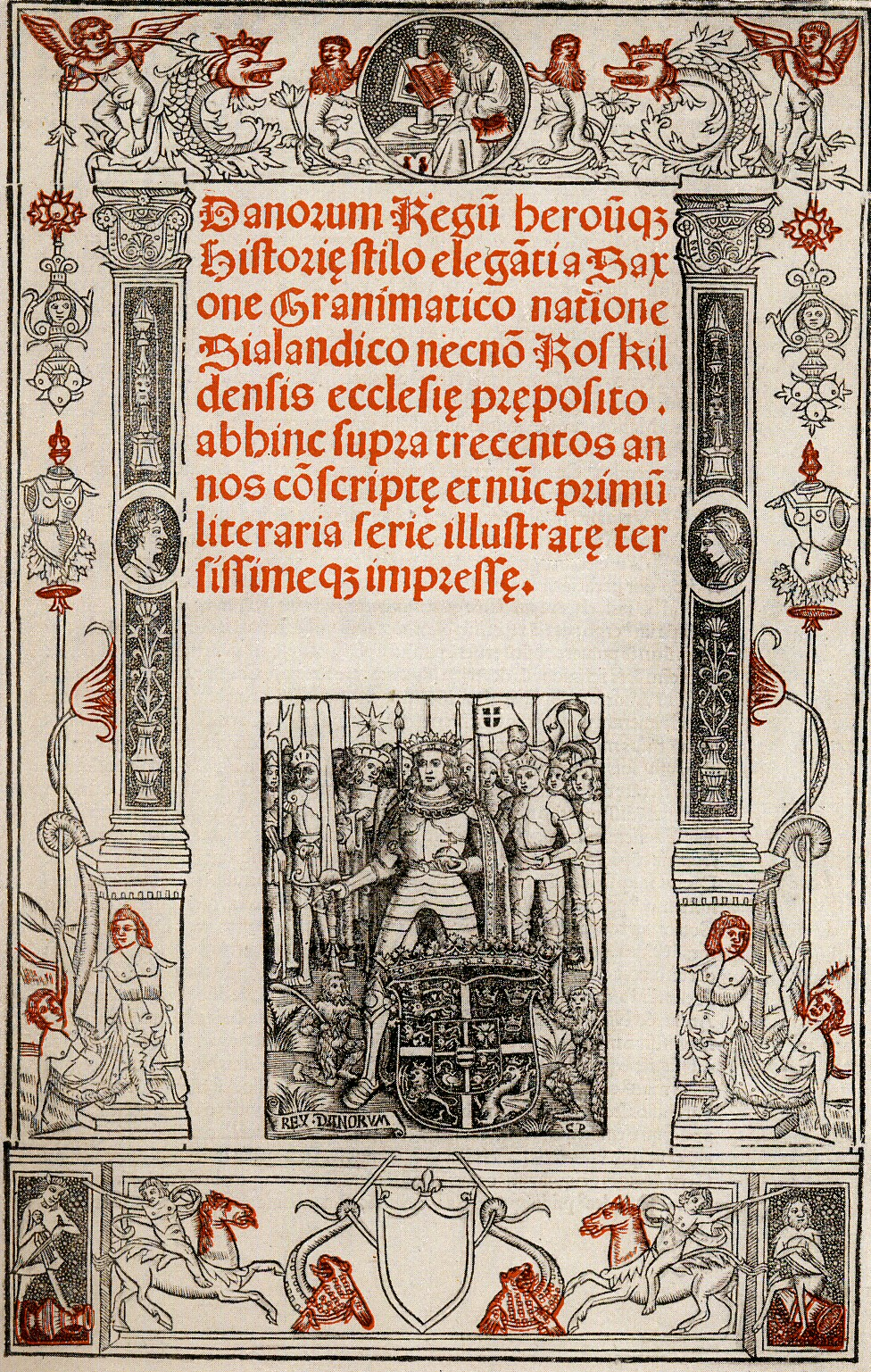
Front page of Christiern Pedersen's Saxo version, Paris 1514.

The first printed press publication and the oldest known complete text of Saxo's works is Christiern Pedersen's Latin edition, printed and published by Jodocus Badius in Paris, France, on 15 March 1514 under the title of Danorum Regum heroumque Historiae ("History of the Kings and heroes of the Danes"). The edition features the following colophon: ...impressit in inclyta Parrhisorum academia Iodocus Badius Ascensius Idibus Martiis. MDXIIII. Supputatione Romana. (the Ides of March, 1514).

The full front page reads (with abbreviations expanded) in Latin:

Danorum Regum heroumque Historiae stilo eleganti a Saxone Grammatico natione Zialandico necnon Roskildensis ecclesiae praeposito, abhinc supra trecentos annos conscriptae et nunc primum literaria serie illustratae tersissimeque impressae.

English language:

Histories of the Kings and heroes of the Danes, composed in elegant style by Saxo Grammaticus, a Zealander and also provost of the church of Roskilde, over three hundred years ago, and now for the first time illustrated and printed correctly in a learned compilation.

==== Latin versions ====
The source of all existing translations and new editions is Christiern Pedersen's Latin Danorum Regum heroumque Historiae. There exist a number of different translations today, some complete, some partial.

- Christiern Pedersen (1514), Danorum Regum heroumque Historiae, Badius Ascensius, Jodocus, 1462-1535
- Johannes Oporinus (1534), Saxonis Grammatici Danorum Historiae Libri XVI
- Philip Lonicer (1576), Danica Historia Libris XVI
- Stephan Hansen Stephanius (1645), Saxonis Grammatici Historiæ Danicæ Libri XVI
- Christian Adolph Klotz (1771), Saxonis Grammatici Historiae Danicae libri XVI
- Peter Erasmus Müller (1839), Saxonis Grammatici Historia Danica
- Alfred Holder (1886), Saxonis Grammatici Gesta Danorum, Strassburg, K. J. Trübner
- Jørgen Olrik; Hans Ræder (1931), Saxonis Gesta Danorum
- Karsten Friis-Jensen (2005), Gesta Danorum

==== Danish translations ====
- Christiern Pedersen, never published ca. 1540, Lost
- Jon Tursons, lost, never published ca. 1555
- Anders Sørensen Vedel (1575), Den Danske Krønicke, Kjøbenhavn, Trykt hos B. Luno
- Sejer Schousbölle (1752), Saxonis Grammatici Historia Danica
- N. F. S. Grundtvig (1818–1822), Danmarks Krønike af Saxo Grammaticus
- Frederik Winkel Horn (1898), Saxo Grammaticus: Danmarks Krønike
- Jørgen Olrik (1908–1912), Sakses Danesaga
- Peter Zeeberg (2000), Saxos Danmarkshistorie , 2 volumes

==== English translations ====
- Oliver Elton (1894), The First Nine Books of the Danish History of Saxo Grammaticus
- Hilda Ellis Davidson, ed. (1979–1980), Saxo Grammaticus: The History of the Danes, Books I-IX, translated by Peter Fisher (Volume 1: English text; volume 2: Commentary by Hilda Ellis Davidson)
- Eric Christiansen (1980–1981), Saxo Grammaticus: Danorum regum herorumque historia, books X-XVI
- William F. Hansen (1983), Saxo Grammaticus and the life of Hamlet
- Karsten Friis-Jensen, ed. (2015), Saxo Grammaticus: Gesta Danorum The History of the Danes, translated by Peter Fisher (Volume 1: Books I-X; Volume 2: Books XI-XVI).

==== Other translations ====
- Hermann Jantzen (1900), Saxo Grammaticus. Die ersten neun Bücher der dänischen Geschichte, Leipzig, W. Engelmann
- Ludovica Koch; Maria Adele Cipolla (1993), Sassone Grammatico: Gesta dei re e degli eroi danesi
- Yukio Taniguchi (1993), Sakuso Guramatikusu: Denmakujin no jiseki
- Santiago Ibáñez Lluch (1999), Saxo Gramático: Historia Danesa
- Андрей С. Досаев (2017), Саксон Грамматик. Деяния данов [Full translation on Russian by Andrey Dosaev in two vols.]
- Daniel Palmqvist (2021), Gesta Danorum, Saxo Grammaticus, En del av Sveriges historia. [The first nine of the 16 books translated into Swedish].

Gesta Danorum is also translated partially in other English, French and German releases.

== Hamlet ==
Certain aspects of Gesta Danorum formed the basis for William Shakespeare's play Hamlet; Saxo's version, told of in books 3 and 4, is very similar to that of Shakespeare's play. The name "Hamlet" itself is an anagram of "Amleth", though it is unclear if this was a deliberate creative choice on Shakespeare's part.

In Saxo's version, two brothers, Orvendil and Fengi are given the rule over Jutland by King Rørik Slyngebond of the Danes. Soon after, Orvendil marries King Rørik's daughter, Geruth (Gertrude in Hamlet). Amleth is their first and only child. Fengi becomes resentful of his brother's marriage, and also wants sole leadership of Jutland, so therefore murders Orvendil. After a very brief period of mourning, Fengi marries Geruth, and declares himself sole leader of Jutland. Eventually, Amleth avenges his father's murder and plans the murder of his uncle, making him the new and rightful King of Jutland. However, while Hamlet dies in Shakespeare's version just after his uncle's death, in Saxo's version Amleth survives and begins ruling his kingdom, going on to other adventures.
