= Plesner Fragment =

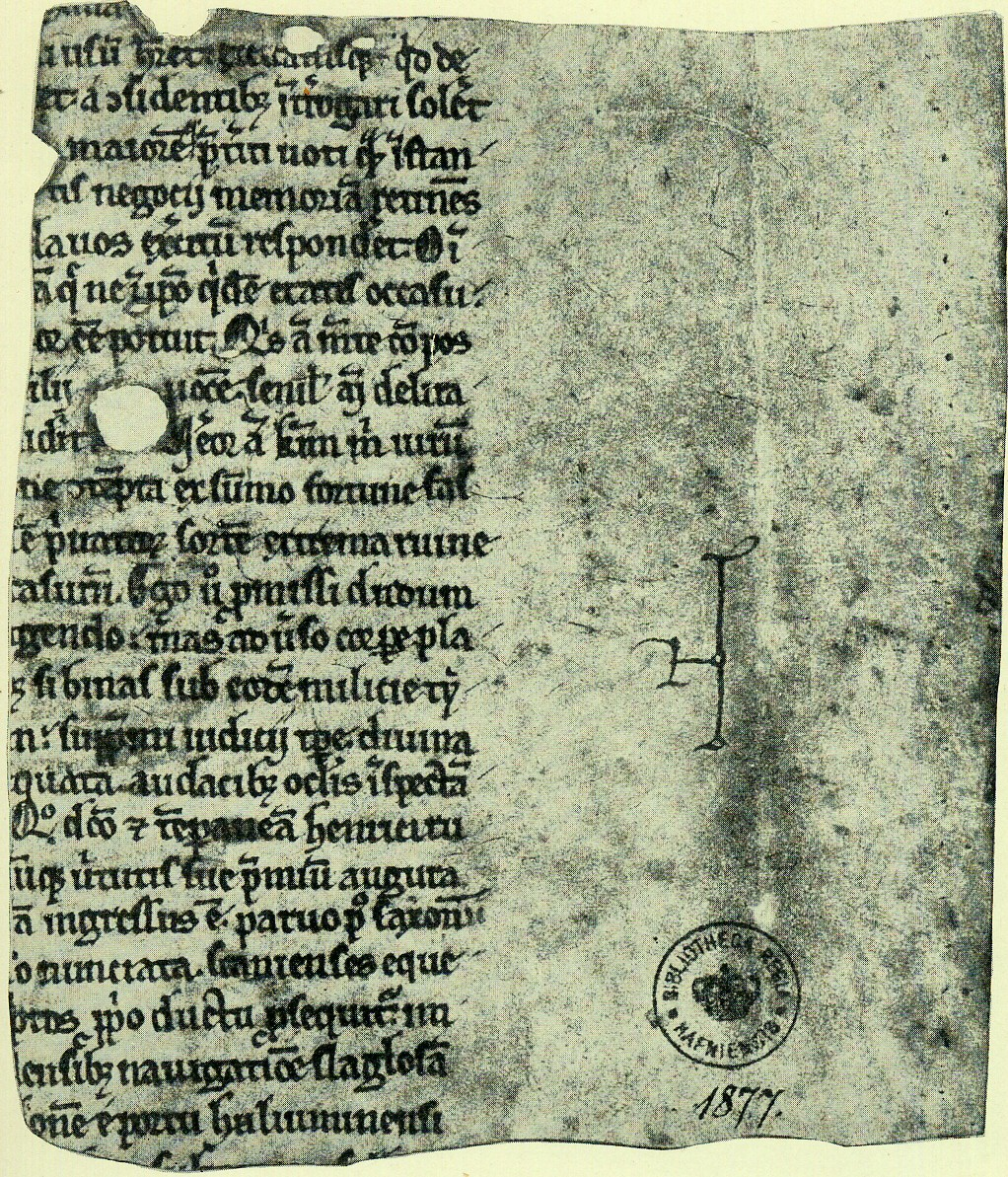
Front

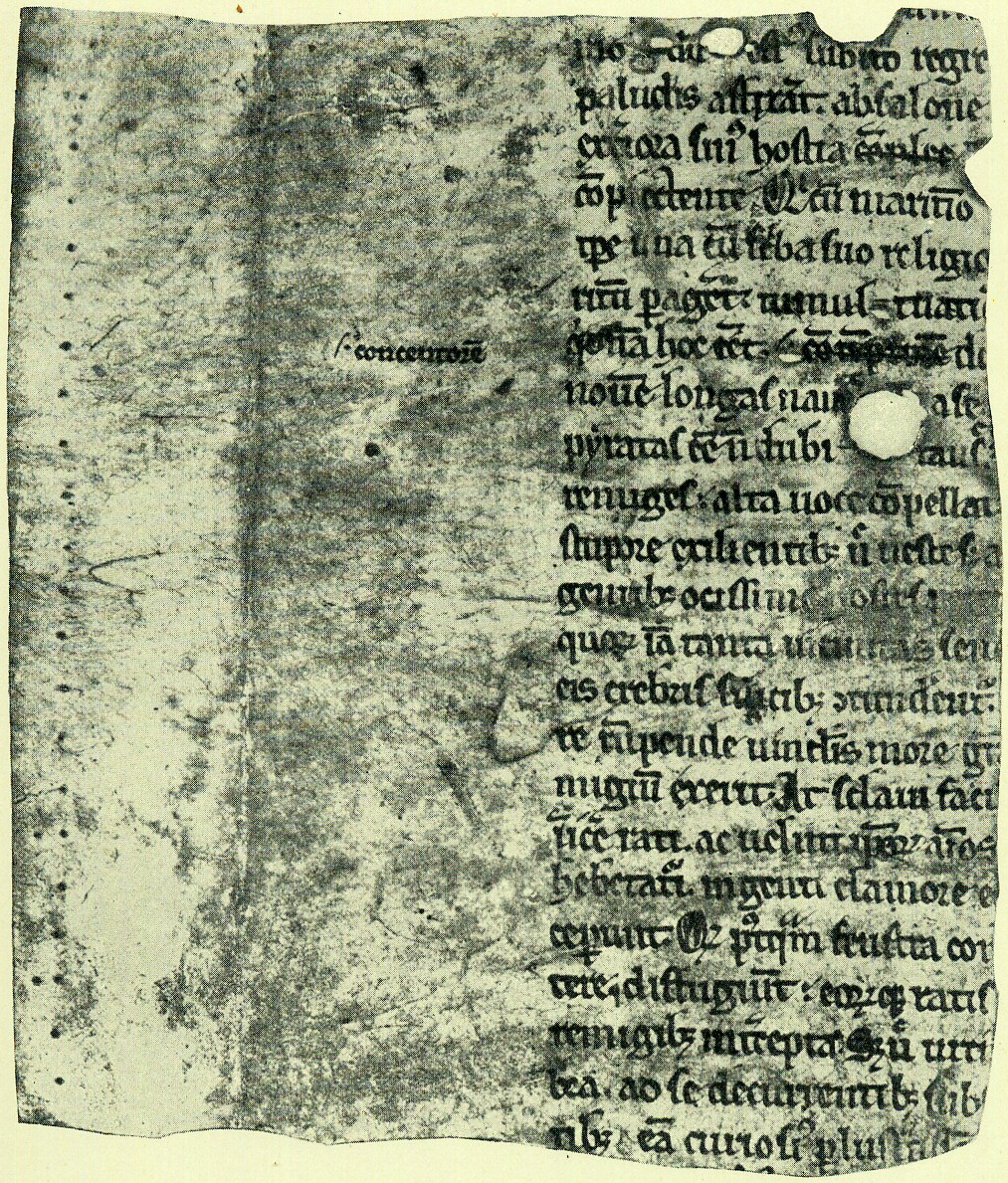
Back

The Plesner Fragment is a parchment page from c. 1275. It is one of the four fragments remaining, or early copy of, the original Saxo Gesta Danorum. Its size is 15 cm × 13 cm. It consists of one page with two written sides.

== History ==
The fragment was found in 1877 by C. U. A. Plesner in Geheime-archive (Danish National Archives), where it was used as staple-list on Kristianstad fief taxman-number (skattemandtal) list of 1623.

The fragment is now owned by the Danish Royal Library in Copenhagen. It has Royal Library signature of Ny kgl. Saml. Fol. 570.

The pages correspond to page 811–813 in Peter Erasmus Müller Latin version of Gesta Danorum from 1839 or page 459.15 – 460.24 in Jørgen Olrik and H. Ræder's Latin version of Gesta Danorum from 1931.

== See also ==
- Angers Fragment
- Lassen Fragment
- Kall-Rasmussen Fragment
