= Lassen Fragment =

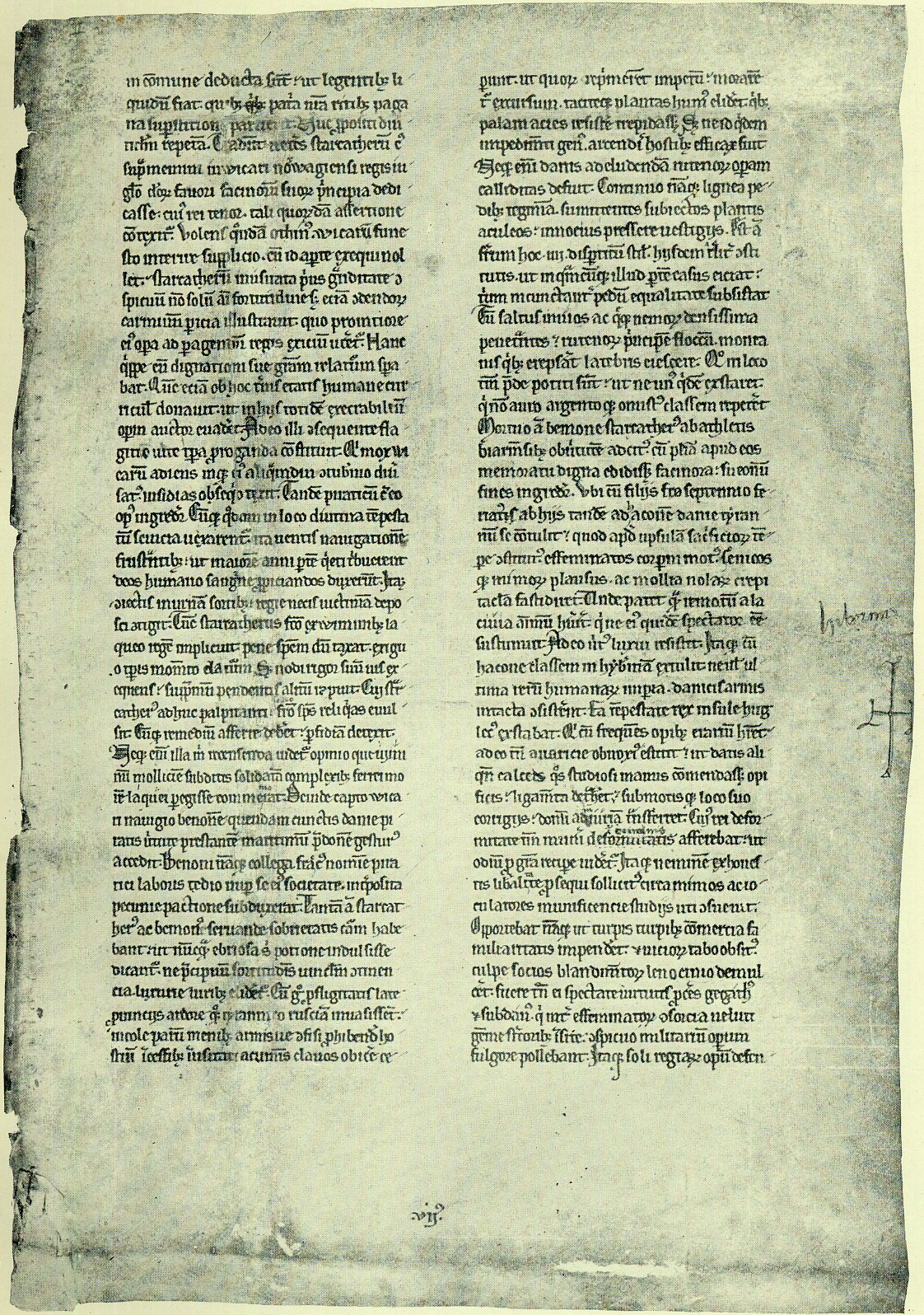
Lassen Fragment, Front

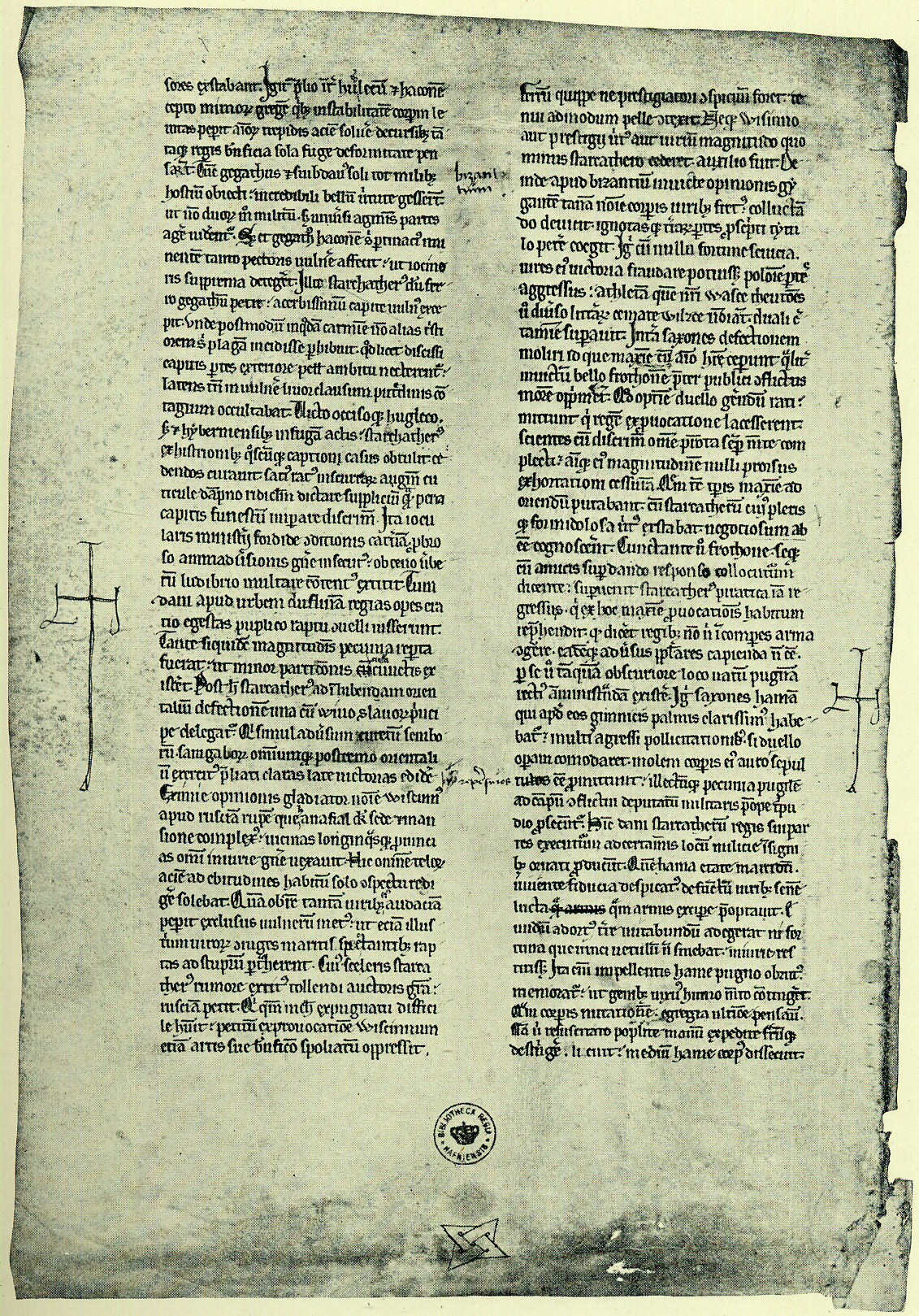
Lassen Fragment, Back

The Lassen Fragment, is a parchment page from c. 1275. It is one of the four fragments remaining of the original, or early copy of, Saxo's Gesta Danorum. Size is 40x27 cm. It consists of one page with two written sides.

== History ==
It was found 1860 in the literary remains of library-secretary G. F. Lassen, and is now owned by the Royal Library of Copenhagen. It has Royal Library signature of Ny kgl. Saml. Fol. 570.

Correspond to page 275–282 in Peter Erasmus Müller Latin version of Gesta Danorum from 1839 or page 152.29 – 156.14 in Jørgen Olrik & H. Ræder's Latin version of Gesta Danorum from 1931.

== See also ==
- Angers Fragment
- Kall-Rasmussen Fragment
- Plesner Fragment
