= Angers Fragment =

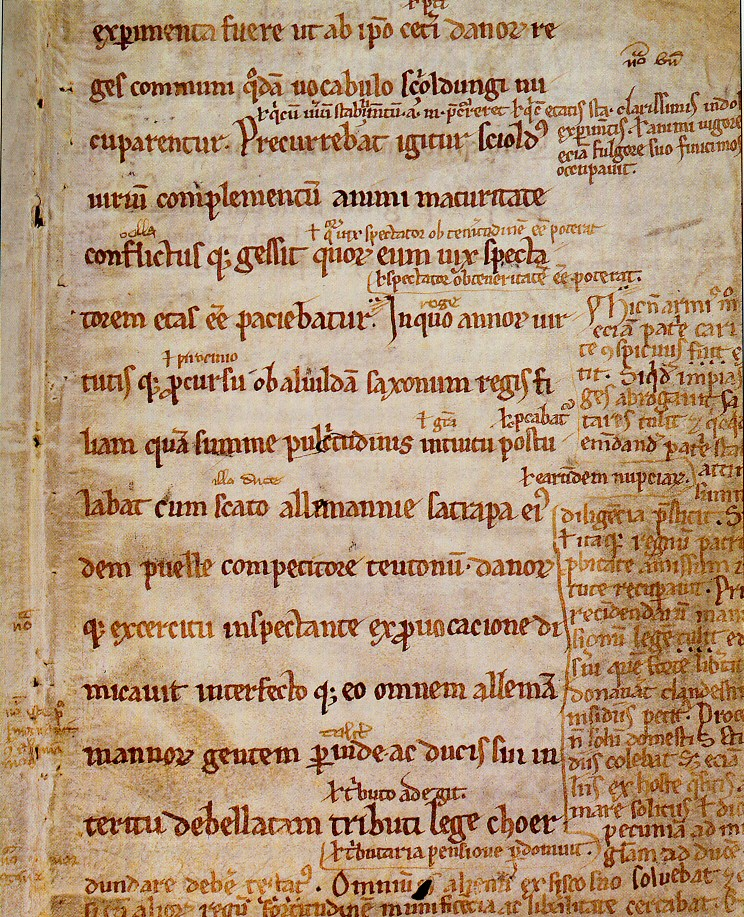
Original Saxo, Angers Fragment, page 1, front

The Angers Fragment (Angersfragmentet) are four parchment pages dating from the 12th century. They are one of the four fragments remaining of the original Gesta Danorum written by Saxo Grammaticus. This is the only fragment attested to be of Saxo's own handwriting. It consists of four pages with 8 written sides.

== History ==
It is first spoken of in Albert Lemarchand's book Catalogue des manuscripts de la Bibliothèque d'Angers,(1863, page 90), in the same library where it had been used as binding for an old book from the 15th century. First identified in 1877, by Gaston Paris and in 1878 exchanged to the Danish Royal Library for the manuscript charter of the abbey of Saint-Martin-des-Champs in Paris. It has the Royal Library signature of Ny kgl. Saml. 4to, 869 g. The text corresponds to pages 24–29 in Peter Erasmus Müller Latin version of Gesta Danorum from 1839 and page 11.19 – 16.29 in Jørgen Olrik & H. Ræder's Latin version of Gesta Danorum from 1931.

== See also ==
- Lassen Fragment
- Kall-Rasmussen Fragment
- Plesner Fragment

== Other sources ==
- Apoteker Sibbernsens Saxobog, C. A. Reitzels Forlag, Copenhagen, 1927. (Copenhagen, C. A. Reitzels Forlag. 1927)
