= Kall-Rasmussen Fragment =

C.1275 parchment page from or of Saxo's Gesta Danorum

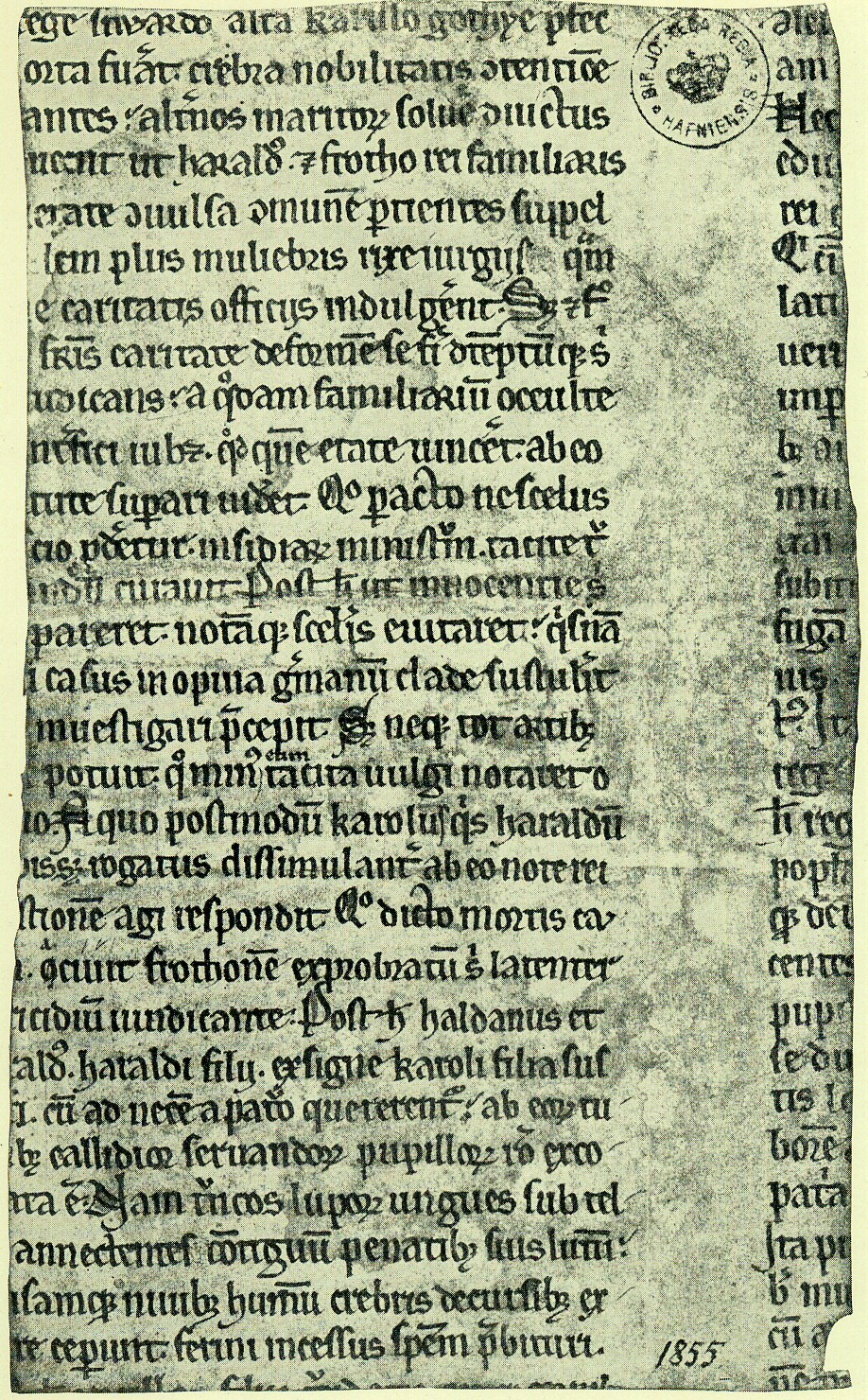
Page 1, Front

The Kall-Rasmussen Fragment is a parchment page from c. 1275. It is one of the four fragments remaining, or early copy of, the original Saxo's Gesta Danorum. Its size is about 19x11cm. It consists of two pages with four written sides.

== History ==
Found in 1855 by M. N. C. Kall Rasmussen in the Danish Geheime-archive (Danish National Archives), where it was used as staple-list on Kronborg Castle's cadastre of 1627–1628. It is now owned by the Royal Library of Copenhagen. It has the Royal Library signature of Ny kgl. Saml. Fol. 570.

Correspond to page 320–324 in Peter Erasmus Müller Latin version of Gesta Danorum from 1839 or page 181.17 – 184.16 in Jørgen Olrik & H. Ræder's Latin version of Gesta Danorum from 1931.

== See also ==
- Angers Fragment
- Lassen Fragment
- Plesner Fragment

== Gallery ==
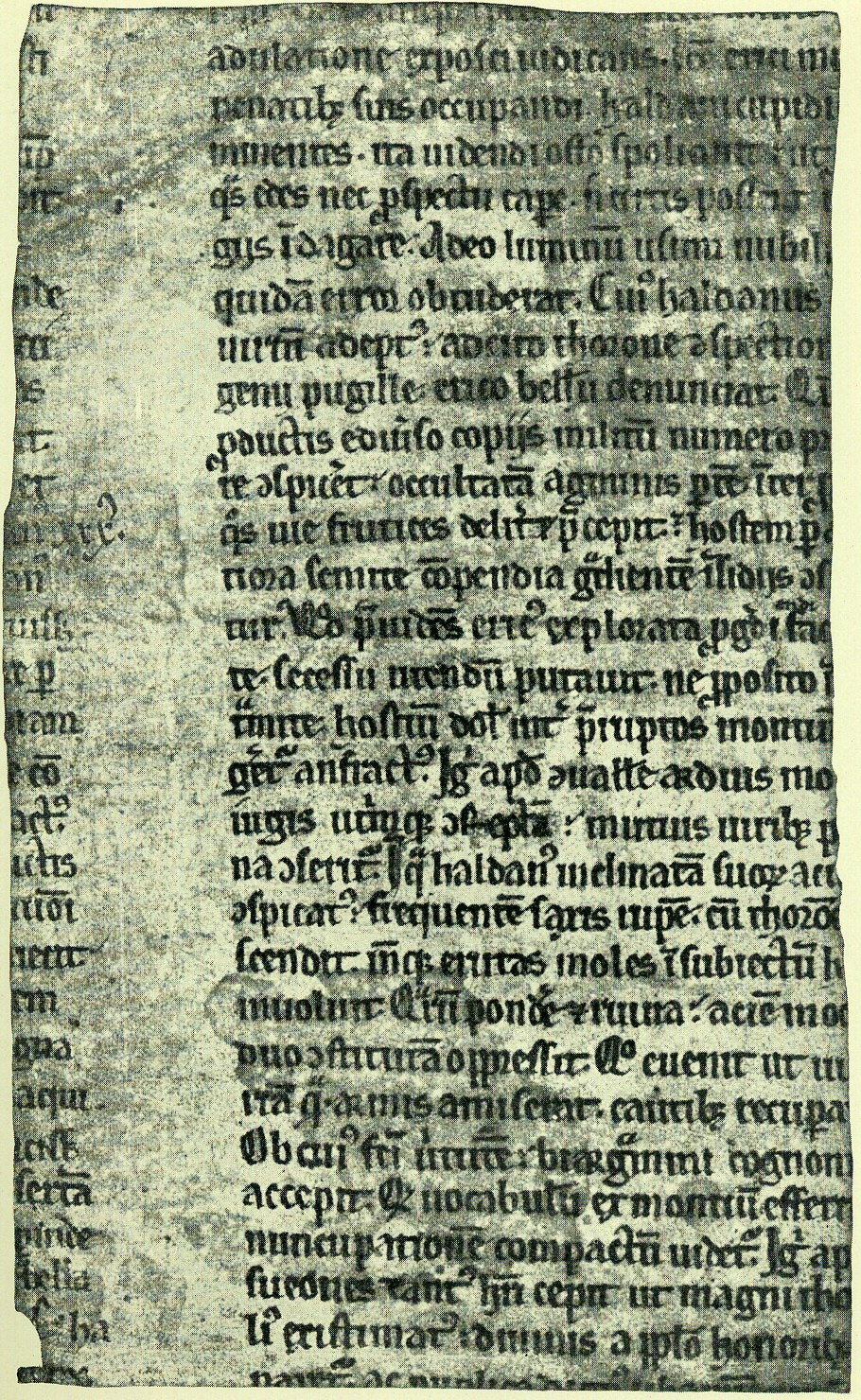
Page 1, Back

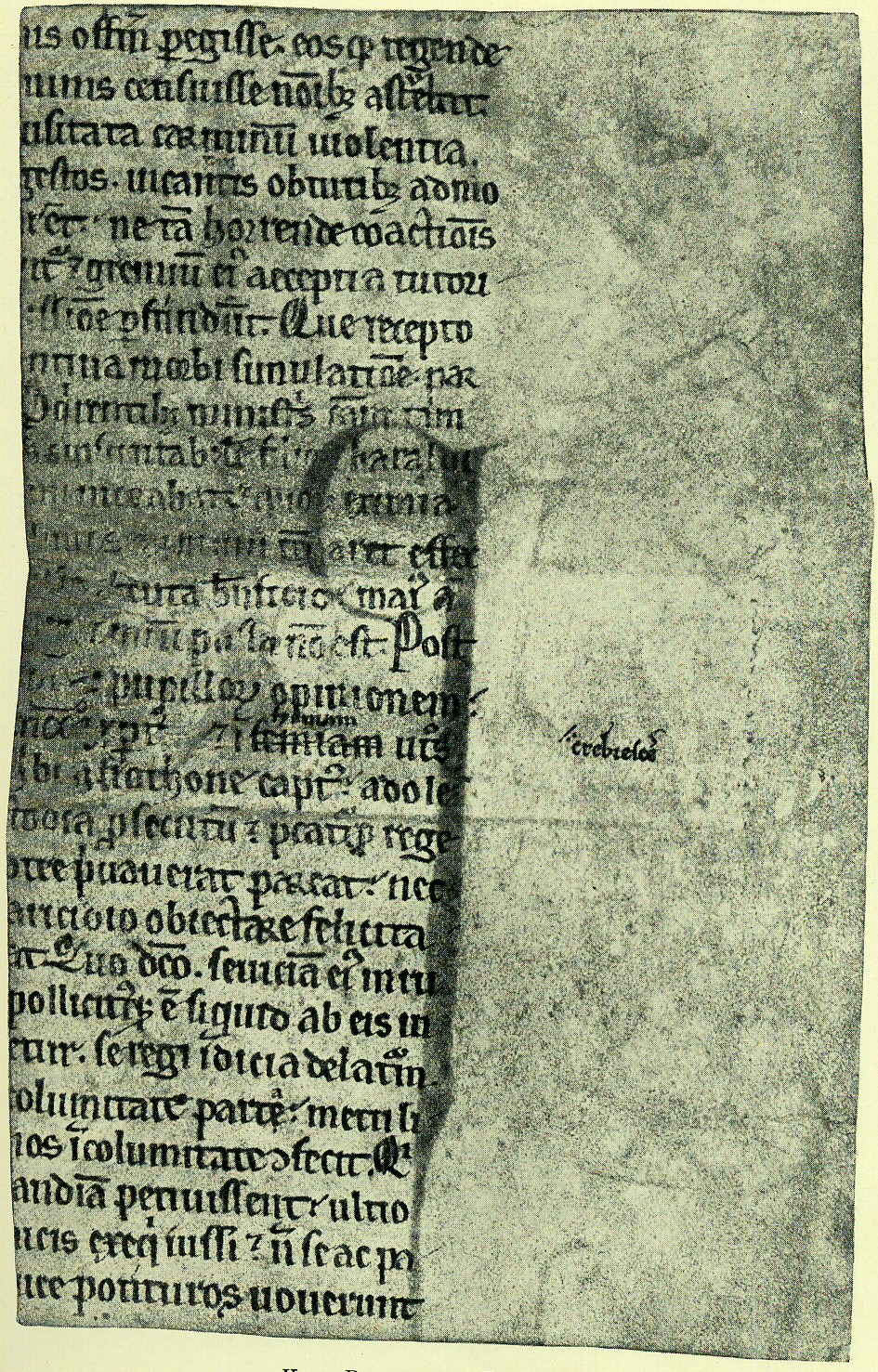
Page 2, Front

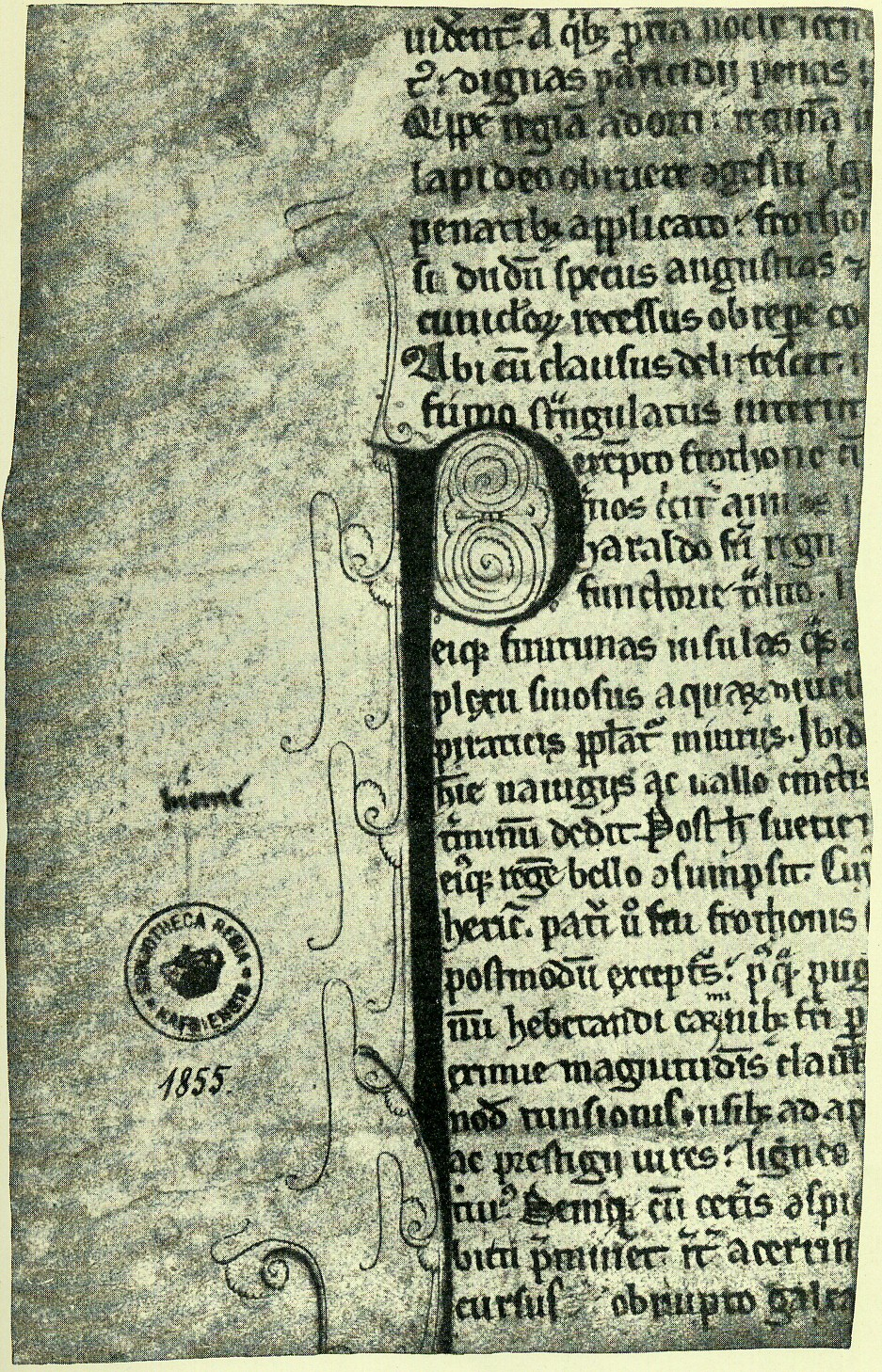
Page 2, Back
