= Jean Petit (printer) =

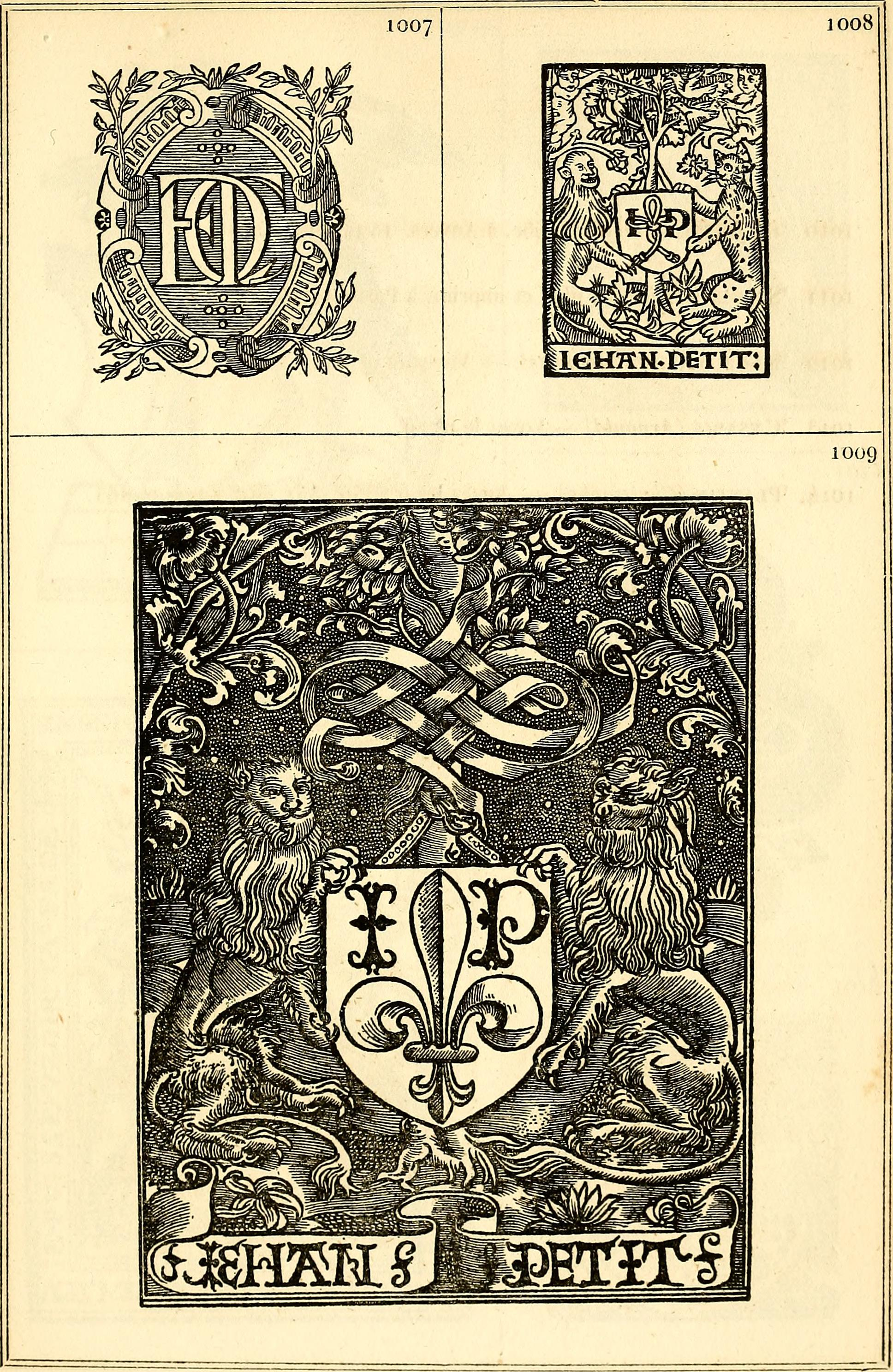
Two printer's marks used by Jehan Petit (top right and bottom).

Jean or Jehan Petit, in Latin Johannes Parvus, was a printer, publisher and bookseller in Paris. From 1493 to 1530 he printed about one tenth of all publications in Paris, more than ten thousand volumes.

Petit was one of the four major booksellers at the University of Paris and greatly contributed to the spread of early Renaissance Humanism in Paris. He published a large number of original editions. Among his collaborators were Robert Estienne and Josse Bade. Petit was an example of a prosperous early printer.

== Published works ==
- Euangelia Cum Commentariis Reverendissimi Domini Domini Thomae de Vio.
- Gringor, Pierre. Heures de Nostre Dame, c 1527
- Beroaldo, Phillipo. On the Symbols of Pythagorus
- Deguilville. Le romant de trois pelerinaiges

Today his works are held in museums and private collections.
