= Philip Lonicer =

German historian

Philip Lonicer (Philippus Lonicerus; died 1599) was a German historian. Lonicer produced a Latin version of the Gesta Danorum in 1576, entitled Danica Historia Libris XVI. He was also the rector of the Frankfurt Gymnasium.
