= Adam August Müller =

Danish painter (1811–1844)

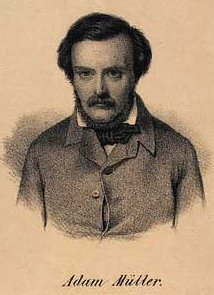
Adam Müller (1844); after a painting by Johan Vilhelm Gertner

Adam August Müller (16 August 1811 – 15 March 1844), a Danish history painter, was one of Eckersberg's favourite students. Generally unhealthy and dead at 32, his work is recognized as an important component in Danish art. His favourite subjects were historical and religious themes.

== Biography ==
A son of Bishop Peter Erasmus Müller (1776-1834), he was born in Copenhagen. In 1825, he became a student of Christoffer Wilhelm Eckersberg (1783– 1853) at the Royal Danish Academy of Fine Arts, joining the Model School in 1828. Müller was deeply influenced by his mentor Eckersberg, an emblematic figure of the Danish Golden Age, whose academic rigor shaped Müller’s development to one day become one of Denmark’s most promising history painters. In 1829, he exhibited Aladdin, staaende bag Pillen, ser Gulnare ("Aladdin, standing behind a pillar, sees Gulnare") and the following year exhibited a number of portraits, two of which were purchased for the Royal Collection.

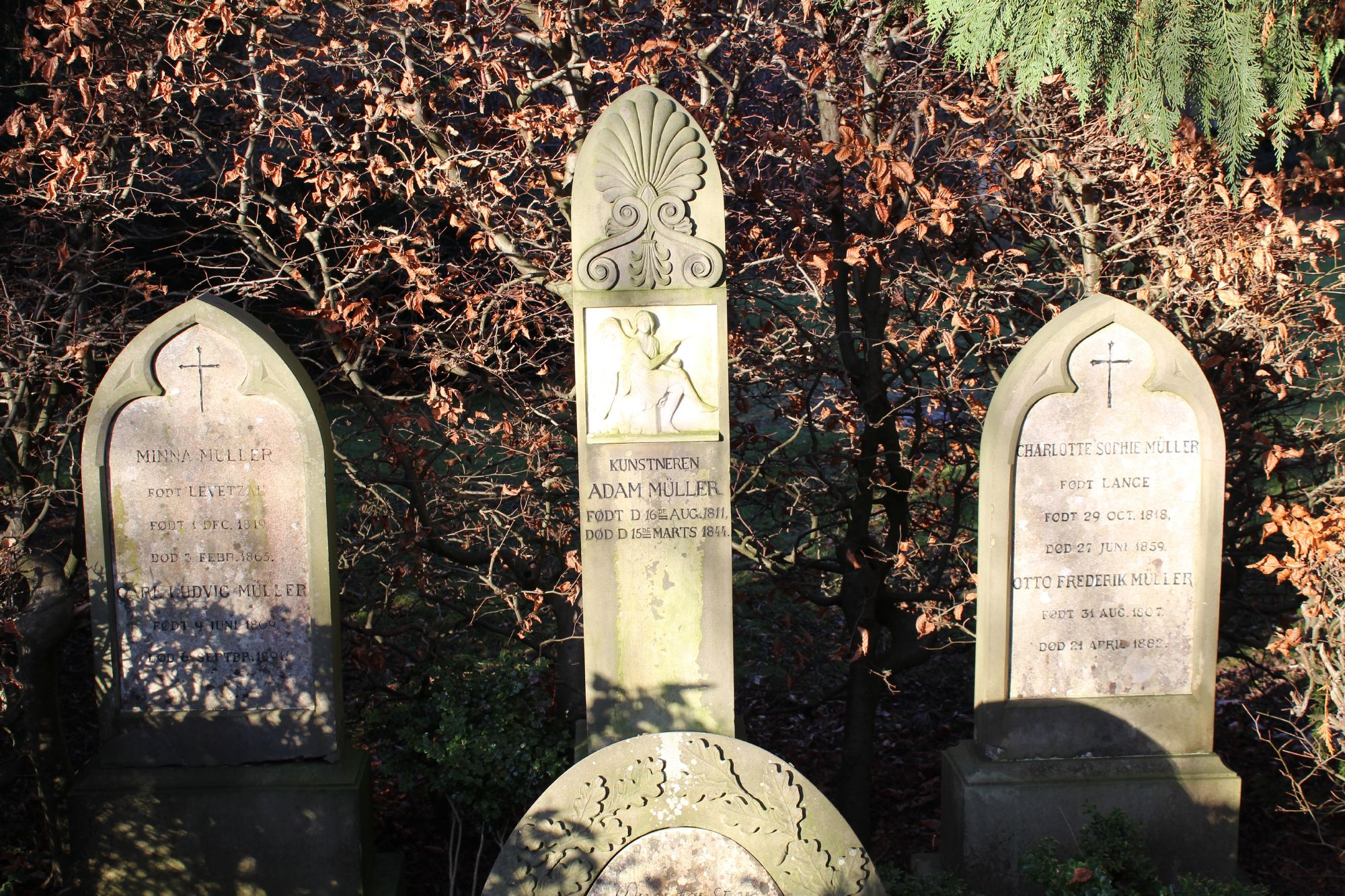
Müller's tomb at Assistens Cemetery in Copenhagen.

In 1838, he competed with Heinrich Eddelien for a scholarship to Italy. Eddelein prevailed but, thanks to the intercession of Bertel Thorvaldsen, Müller received some travel money as well. In 1839, he went to Italy after a short stay in Munich. His studies of Florentine painting encouraged him to adopt a new approach to religious painting, emulating the old Italian style. This earned him the Thorvaldsen Medal for "Christ Blesses the Four Evangelists", painted in 1843 after he had returned to Denmark.

He had only just recovered from a serious illness when he went to Italy and was frequently ill while there. After his return to Copenhagen, his health deteriorated and he died there, leaving several unfinished commissions.

== Selected works ==
- Aladdin, staaende bag Pillen, ser Gulnare (1829)
- Cleobis og Biton (1830)
- Aladdin griber imellem andre drenge efter de nedkastede pommeranser (1831)
- Landskab med en hvilende jæger (1832)
- Den Saarede Herluf Trolle, som modtages af sin Hustru og af Skolens Disciple paa Herlufsholm (1832)
- Flugten til Ægypten (1833)
- Brystbillede af en ældre mand (1834)
- Christus prædiker fra Skibet, altarpiece (1834)
- Odysseus kommer til Nausikae (1835)
- Valdemar Sejer i Fængsel (1836)
- David opmuntrer Saul ved sit Harpespil (1838)
- Christus giver sig til Kjende for Disciplene i Emmaus (1838)
- Christus velsigner de 4 Evangelister (1842)
- Den fortabte Søns Hjemkomst (1843)

== Gallery ==
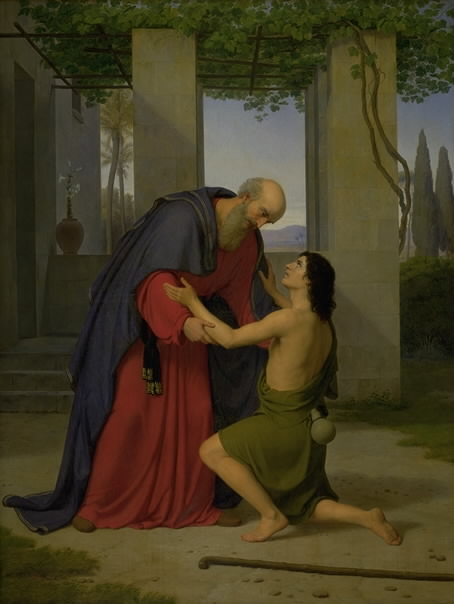
Homecoming of the
Prodigal Son (1843)

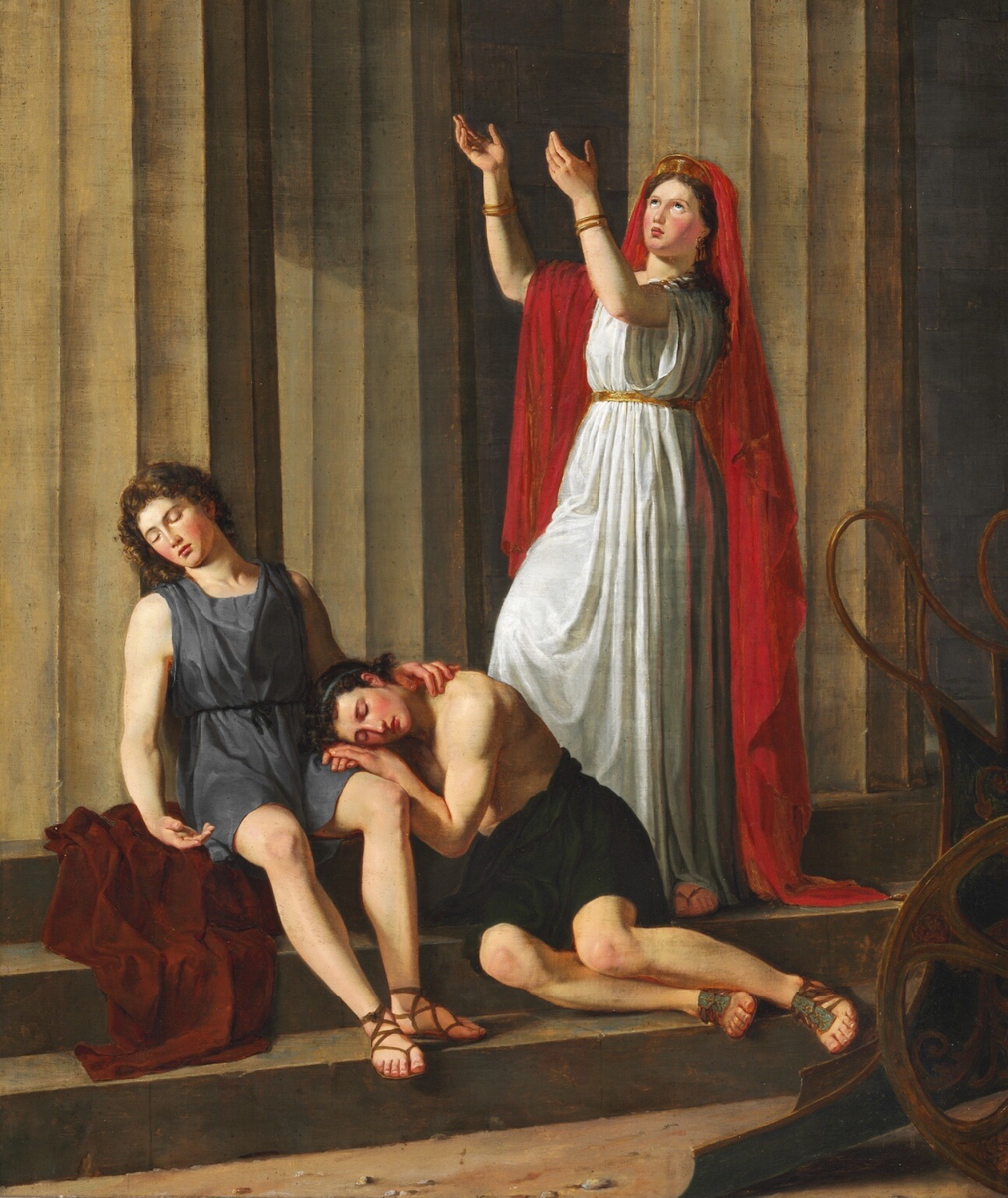
Kleobis and Biton (1830)

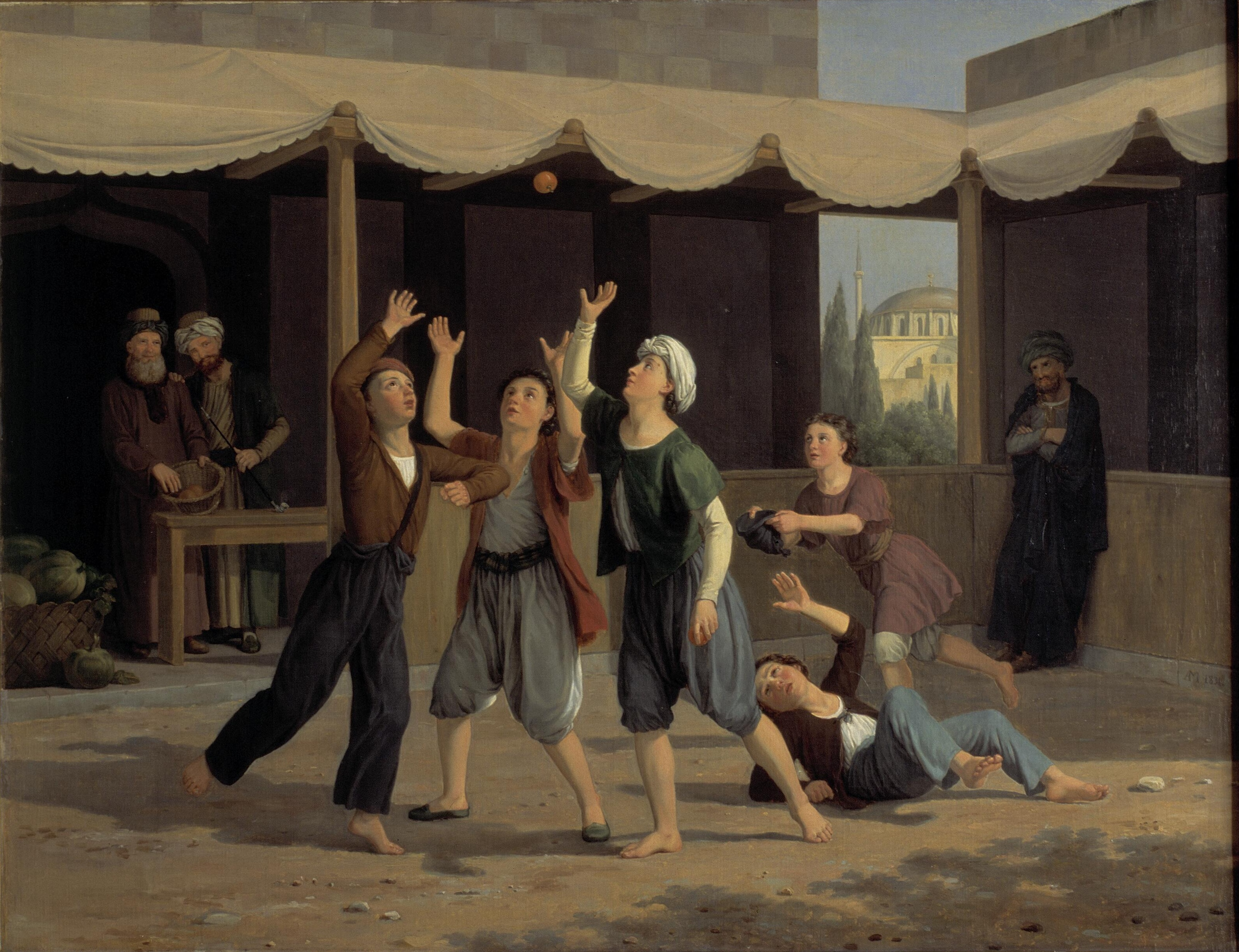
Aladdin Tries to Catch the Falling Orange (1831)

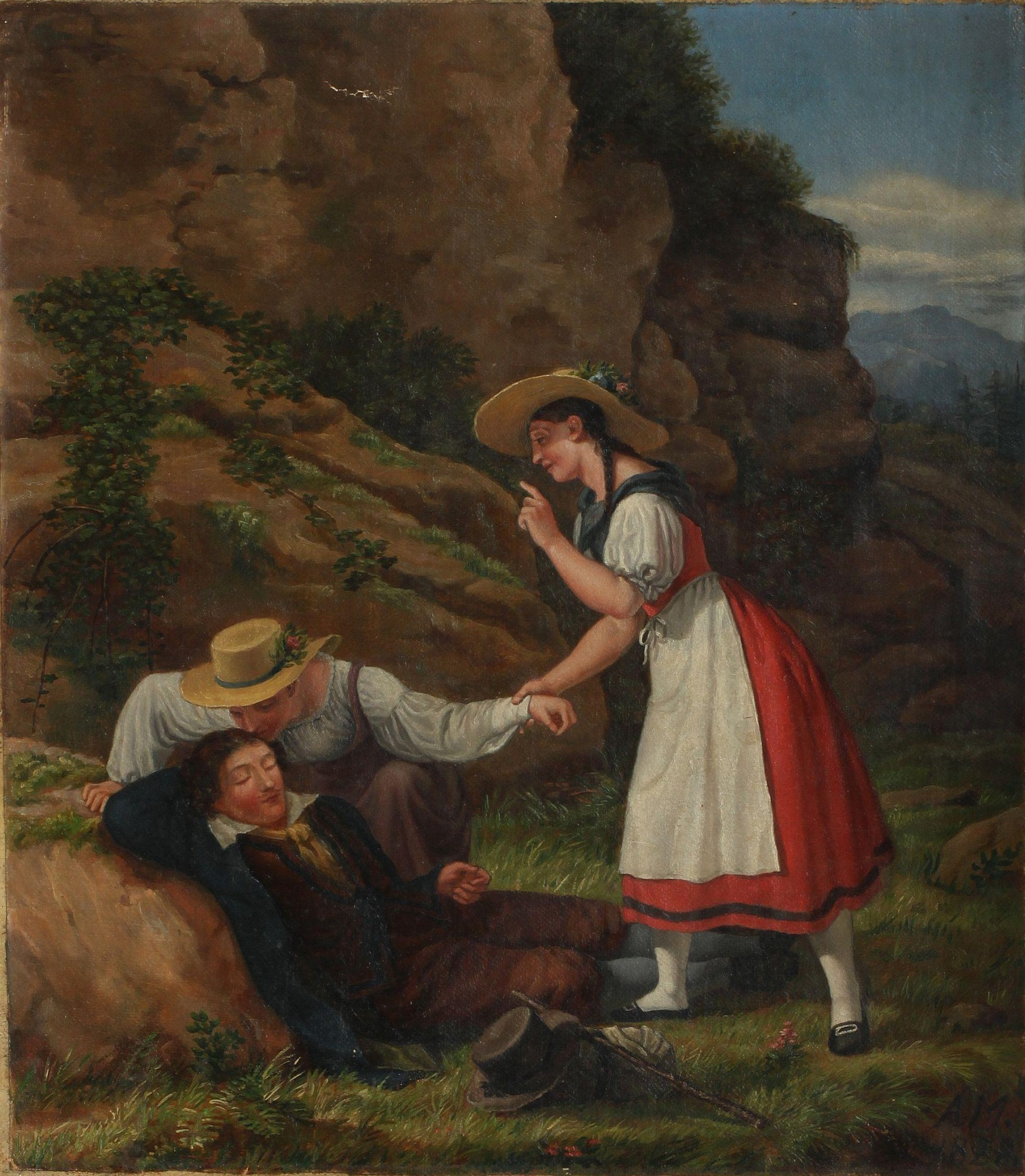
Sleeping Man with
Two Young Girls (1828)

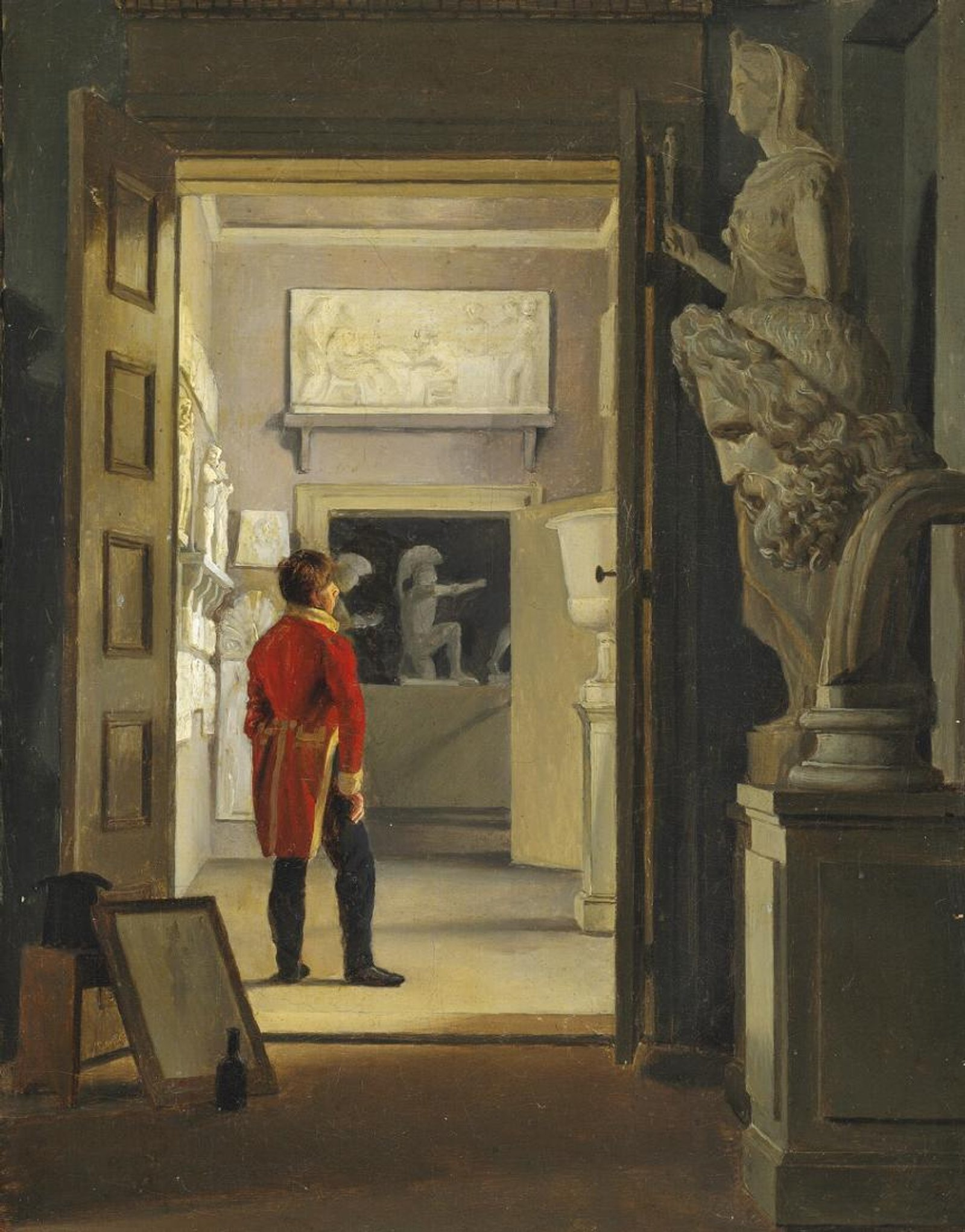
The Hall of Antiquities at Charlottenborg Palace, Copenhagen (1830), Metropolitan Museum of Art

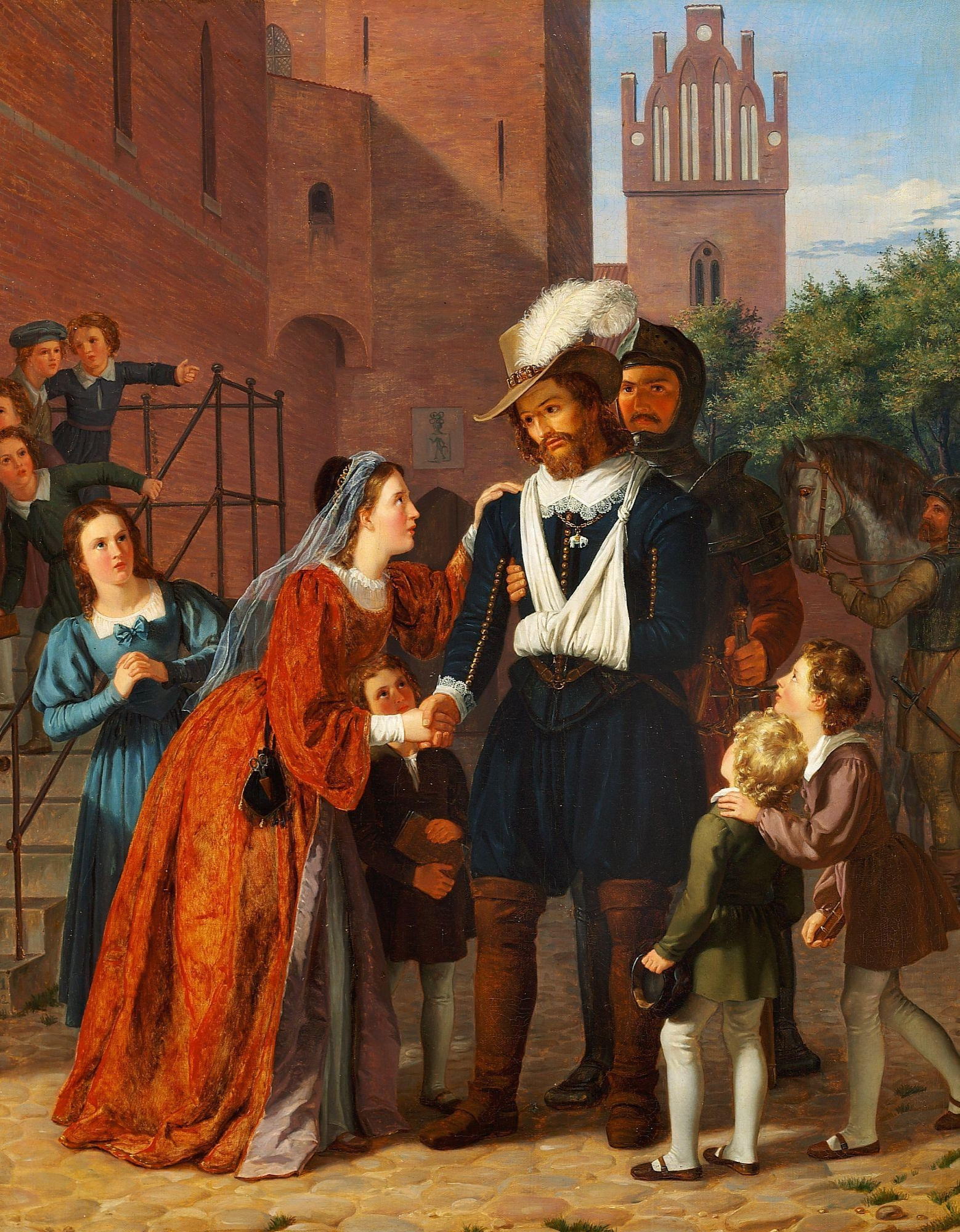
Herluf Trolle Returns to Herlufsholm School (1832)
