= Compendium Saxonis =

Compendium Saxonis (also known as Abbreviatio Saxonis) is a summary located in Chronica Jutensis. It contains a summary of Saxo’s Gesta Danorum, about one-fourth the size of the original. It is written in Latin.

It is thought to have been written by the same author as Chronica Jutensis.

In this summary, the name Gesta Danorum is found. It is not known if Saxo also used this name for his original work.

As this is a summary, a large part of the original work is cut out, which some readers have found frustrating. As the author is less interested in war and battles, stories dealing with such things are often cut heavily.

The original manuscript is lost, but it survives in four different handwritten copies, about a hundred years younger. One was written by a Monk from Odense in 1431.

Latin copies can be found in:

- Danish Royal Library of Copenhagen, Add.. 49 2o (1431)
- Danish Royal Library of Copenhagen, Don. Var. 139 4o (14/15th century).
- Swedish Royal Library of Stockholm, De la Gardie 44 4o (15th century)
- Swedish Royal Library of Stockholm, Skokloster 47 4o (15th century)
