= The Hall of Antiquities at Charlottenborg Palace, Copenhagen =

1830 painting by Adam August Müller

- Partie af Antiksalen paa Charlottenborg (Danish)
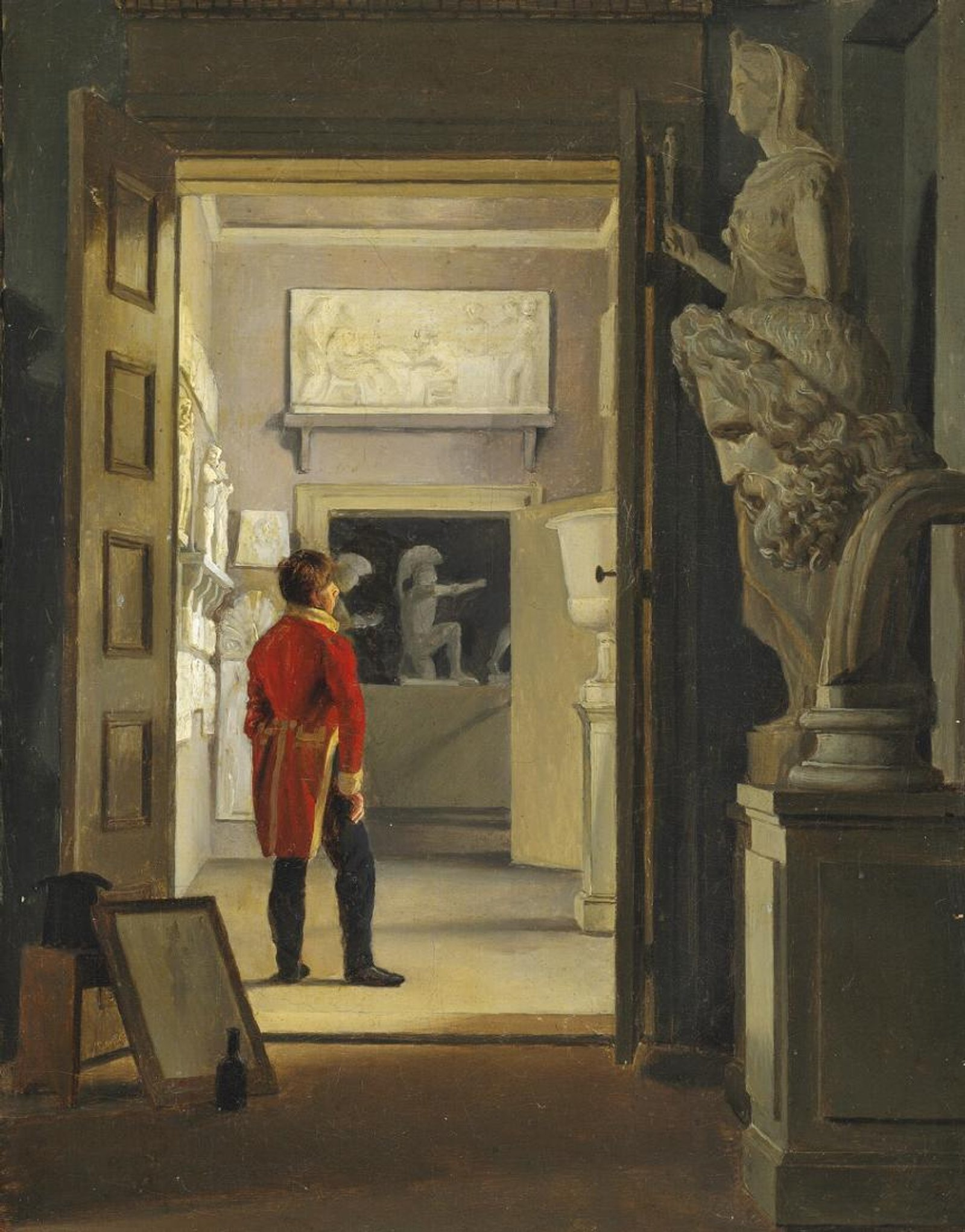
- Artist: Adam August Müller
- Year: 1830
- Medium: Oil on canvas
- Dimensions: 31.5 cm × 25 cm (12.4 in × 9.8 in)
- Location: Metropolitan Museum of Art; New York City
- Accession: 2018.280

The Hall of Antiquities at Charlottenborg Palace, Copenhagen is a 19th-century painting by Danish artist Adam August Müller. Done in oil on canvas, the painting depicts a young custodian guarding the hall of antiquities at Charlottenborg Palace, Copenhagen. The work is currently in the collection of the Metropolitan Museum of Art.

== Description ==
=== Background ===
Produced in 1830, Hall of Antiquities was painted by Adam August Müller while the young artist was under the tutelage of Christoffer Wilhelm Eckersberg. A prominent artist of the Danish Golden Age, Eckersberg encouraged his young student to produce paintings in his own style; with the support of his influential tutor, Müller was able to paint in the style of History painting—an uncommon genre among Danish painters of the time.

At the time of Müller's rendering of Hall of Antiquities, the most extensive collection of antiquities in Denmark was located in Charlottenborg Palace. The palace was also the seat of the Royal Danish Academy of Fine Art, and as such was attached great cultural importance in Denmark.

=== Painting ===
Müller's work depicts three chambers in Charlottenborg Palace's hall of antiquities. Several Hellenic sculptures can be seen, as can the relief Hector's Body Surrounded by His Mourning Family, by the contemporaneous Herman Wilhelm Bissen. A single young man (a custodian) can be seen, dressed in the red frock uniform of the palace.
