= Hermann Jantzen =

Hermann Jantzen (28 May 1866-13 November 1959) was a Christian Mennonite missionary to Russian Turkestan.

When he was a teenager, Jantzen's family followed Claas Epp, Jr. to Central Asia on the Great Trek. He became a court interpreter for Muhammad Rahim II in the Khanate of Khiva before rising through the ranks as an interior ministry official for Russian Turkestan. Later in life, he became a missionary in what is now Uzbekistan, Kazakhstan and Kyrgyzstan. His life is noted for positive relationships with his Muslim neighbors, harrowing pursuits by Russian authorities, and his work on the mission field.
