= Philippe Renouard =

French bookseller and bibliographer

Philippe Ernest Augustin Renouard
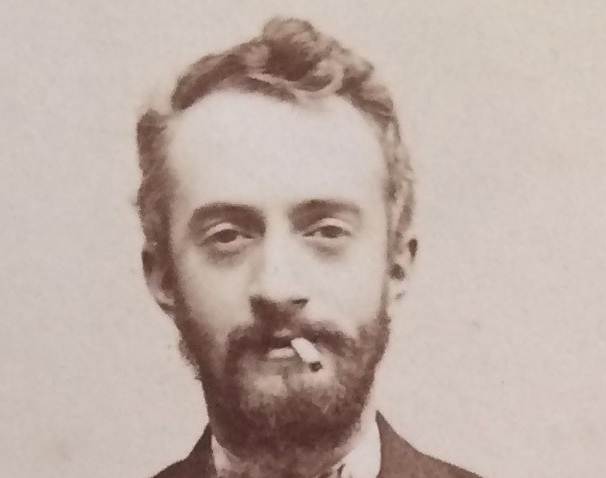
- Philippe Ernest Auguste Renouard
- Born: 15 September 1862 Paris, France
- Died: 2 October 1934 (aged 72) Paris, France
- Occupation: bibliographer, bookseller

Philippe Ernest Augustin Renouard (15 September 1862 in Paris – 2 October 1934 in Paris) was a French bookseller and bibliographer, specialist of the 16th century.

== Biography ==
A grandson of Charles Renouard and son of Alfred Renouard, founder with D'Eichthal of the Compagnie des Salins du Midi, Philippe Renouard studied at the Lycée Condorcet. He was later sent to the University of Montpellier in order to succeed his father in the Salins du Midi. After the death of his father in 1883, and that of D'Eichthal, he turned to a career in the Conseil d'État and took the entrance exam but decided to devote himself to books.

Partnering in 1892 with Georges Chamerot, the printer of Revue des deux Mondes, he took over the business, which he renamed Imprimerie Renouard, located at 19 rue des Saints-Pères, then played an important role in the typographers' trade unions. He was vice president of the "Union des maîtres imprimeurs de France" from 1902 and of the Cercle de la librairie, and later president of the "Chambre Syndicale des imprimeurs typographes".

A laureate of the Institut de France (prix Brunet), he was a member of the admissions committee of the Milan International (1906).

== Main publications ==
- Imprimeurs et libraires parisiens du XVIe
- Documents sur les imprimeurs, libraires… ayant exercé à Paris de 1450 à 1600, Paris, H. Champion, 1901
- Répertoire des imprimeurs parisiens, libraires et fondeurs de caractères en exercice à Paris au XVIIe. Avant-propos de Dominique Renouard, préf. Henri-Jean Martin, Paris, Minard, 1965

== Sources ==
- Pierre Marot, Philippe Renouard, 1862–1934
