= Chronica Jutensis =

Danish historical work

Chronica Jutensis (Danish: Jyske Krønike English: Jutland Chronicle) also known as Continuatio compendii Saxonis or Chronica Danorum, is a small Danish historical work from the middle of the 14th century, written in Latin. It comes with a smaller summary edition, about one-fourth the size of the original, of Saxo’s Gesta Danorum, known as Compendium Saxonis.

The original manuscript is lost; however the work survives in four different handwritten copies, about a hundred years younger. One of them was written by a monk from Odense in 1431.

The stories of Chronica Jutensis begin approximately where Gesta Danorum ends, in King Canute VI's reign, just before King Valdemar II gains the throne, and end with the beginning of King Valdemar Atterdag's reign, about 1342.

It was written somewhere around 1342–1350. Since the book does not mention Estonia being sold to the Livonian Order, which happened on 29 September 1346, it must have been written before this date or only shortly after. It would probably not be common knowledge for a few years, so it may have been written after 1346.

The author is not known. It is, however, thought that he was from Jutland because Jutland events and persons are thoroughly described and it seems that the writer is confident with both the topography and persons of Jutland.

Latin copies reside in:

- Danish Royal Library of Copenhagen, Add.. 49 2o (1431)
- Den Arnamagnæanske Samling, Copenhagen, AM 107 8o (16th century).
- Riksarkivet, Stockholm, Skokloster 47 4o (15th century).
- Uppsala University Library, De la Gardie 44 4o (15th century).
