= Jodocus Badius =

Burgundian-French pioneer of printing (1462–1535)

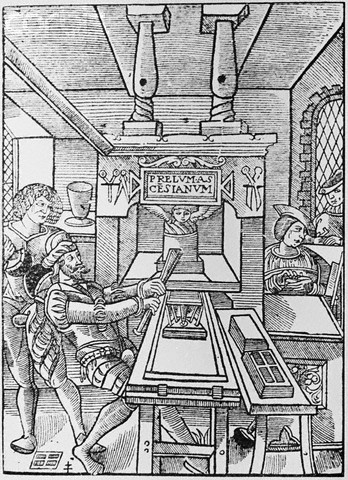
- Born: 1462; Asse
- Died: 1535 (aged 72–73)
- Occupations: printer, grammarian, pedagogue

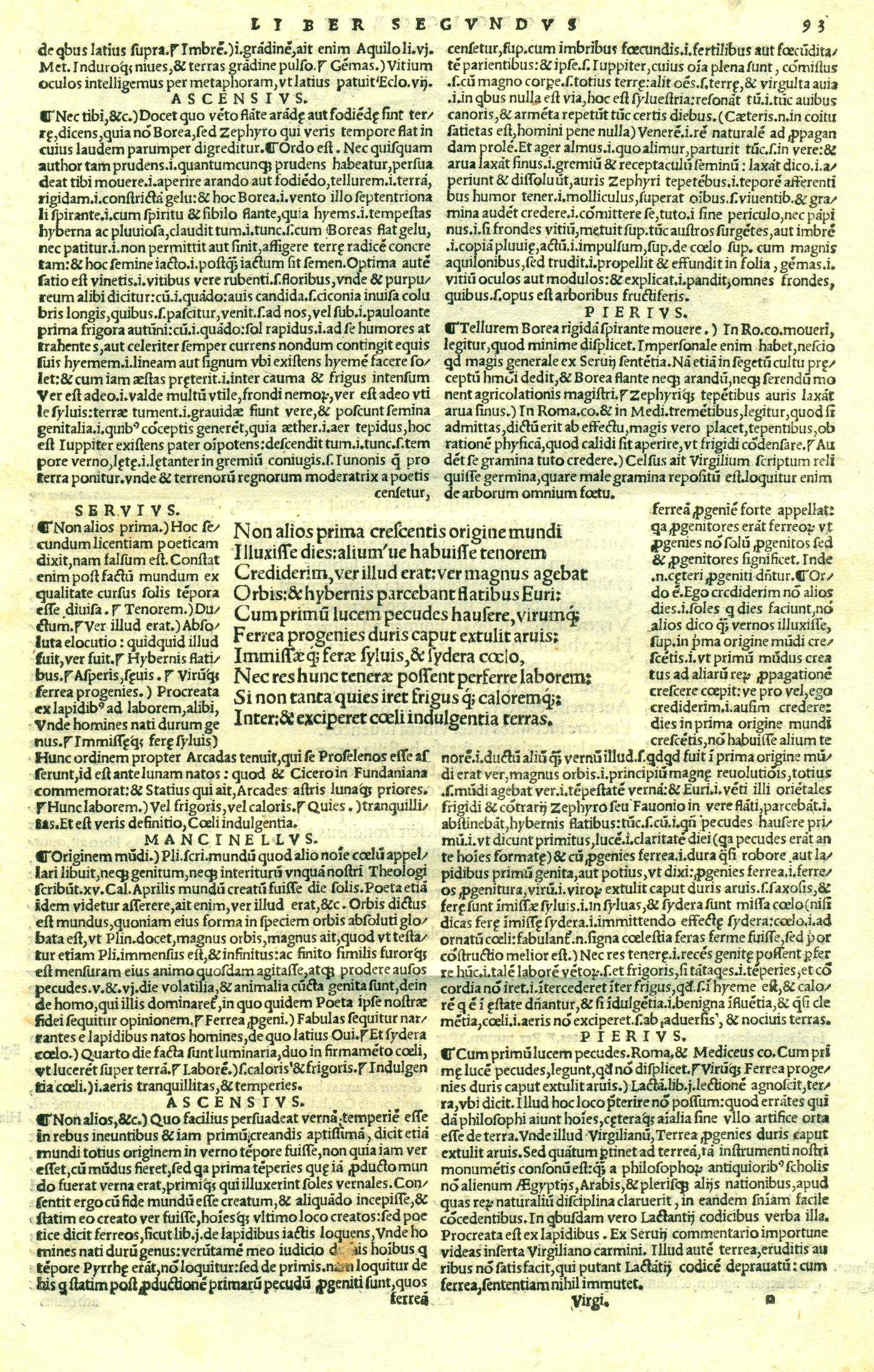
Bucolica, Georgica, et Aeneis, Servii Mauri Honorati & Aelii Donati commentariis illustrata (Basel 1544) with the commentary of Badius (Ascensius) printed next to the text.

Jodocus Badius (French: Josse Bade; Spanish: Jodoco del Badia; 1462 – 1535), also known as Josse Badius, Jodocus van Asche Badius, and Badius Ascensius, was a Burgundian-French pioneer of the printing industry, a grammarian, and a pedagogue.

== Life ==
Josse Badius was born in the village of Asse (formerly Assche) near Brussels in Flemish Brabant in AD 1462. He was a scholar of considerable repute, studying in Brussels and Ferrara and teaching Greek for several years at Lyon, France. During the years 1492–1498, while in Lyon, he began working as a proofreader and editor for the printer Jean Trechsel.

He moved to Paris, where he established his own printing house in the year 1503, which eventually took the name Prelum Ascensianum. With 775 editions, it served as one of the most active publishers during the first three decades of the 16th century. He specialized in Roman classical texts in Latin, often with his own familiare commentum for the student market. For example, for the 2nd-century BC Roman playwright Terence, Badius printed a Praenotamenta in 1502. This introduced the subject of Roman comedy through a lengthy treatment of general theories of poetry and thorough discussion of its origins, development, and classifications. He also published work by contemporary humanist writers. He frequently worked with or for Johannes Parvus (Jean Petit), the era's most important bookseller and publisher.

He was also the author of numerous pieces, amongst which are a life of Thomas a Kempis and a satire on the follies of women entitled Navicula Stultarum Mulierum.

Badius died in 1535. His epitaph was written by his grandson Henry Stephanus. His work was continued by his second son, Conrad. After Conrad confessed to being a Huguenot, he was forced to flee to Calvinist Geneva in 1549.

== Gallery ==
Another woodcut printer's mark of the Prelum Ascensianum ("press of Ascensius") in 1508.

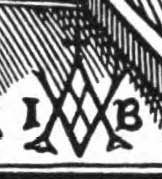
The monogram I V A B (Iodocus Van Asche Badius) in the lower part of the same printer's mark.

== See also ==
- Editio princeps

== Bibliography ==
- Torello-Hill, Giulia (2026), Jodocus Badius Ascensius' Praenotamenta to Terence, Bloomsbury Publishing.
- Baynes, T. S., ed. (1878), "Jodocus Badius" , Encyclopædia Britannica, vol. 3 (9th ed.), New York: Charles Scribner's Sons, p. 228
- Chisholm, Hugh, ed. (1911), "Badius, Jodocus" , Encyclopædia Britannica, vol. 3 (11th ed.), Cambridge University Press, p. 189
- Monter, E. William (1999). Judging the French Reformation: Heresy Trials by Sixteenth-century Parlements. Harvard University Press. ISBN 978-0-674-48860-1.
- Renouard, Ph. (1908). Bibliographie des impressions et des œuvres de Josse Badius Ascensius imprimeur et humaniste, 1462-1535 (in French). Vol. 3 vols. Paris: Ém. Paul et fils et Guillemin.
- Smith, A.M. (1901), Printing and Writing Materials, Philadelphia
- Renouard, Philippe (1969), Imprimeurs & Libraires Parisiens du XVI^{e} Siècle (in French), vol. II, Paris
- White, Paul (2013). Jodocus Badius Ascensius: Commentary, Commerce and Print in the Renaissance. Oxford University Press. ISBN 978-0-19-726554-3.
