= Saxo Grammaticus =

Danish historian (c. 1150 – c. 1220)

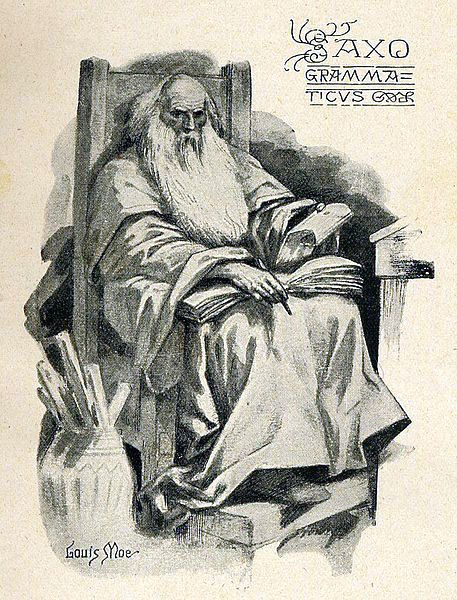
- Saxo by the Norwegian illustrator Louis Moe
- Born: c. 1150; Zealand
- Died: c. 1220 (aged around 70)
- Occupations: Historian and scholar of Absalon

Academic background
- Influences: Renaissance scholars William Shakespeare

Academic work
- Main interests: Danish history, theology
- Notable works: Gesta Danorum

Saxo Grammaticus (Note: (meaning "Saxo the Grammarian")) (c. 1150 – c. 1220), also known as Saxo cognomine Longus, was a Danish historian, theologian, and author. He is thought to have been a clerk or secretary to Absalon, Archbishop of Lund, the main advisor to Valdemar I of Denmark. He is the author of the Gesta Danorum, the first full history of Denmark, from which the legend of Amleth would come to inspire the story of Hamlet by Shakespeare.

== Life ==
The Jutland Chronicle gives evidence that Saxo was born in Zealand. It is unlikely he was born before 1150 and it is supposed that his death could have occurred around 1220. His name Saxo was a common name in medieval Denmark. The name Grammaticus ("the learned") was first given to him in the Jutland Chronicle and the Sjælland Chronicle makes reference to Saxo cognomine Longus ("with the byname 'the tall'").

He lived in a period of warfare and Danish expansion, led by Archbishop Absalon and the Valdemars. The Danes were also being threatened by the Wends who were making raids across the border and by sea. Valdemar I had also just won a civil war and later Valdemar II led an expedition across the Elbe to invade Holstein.

Sven Aggesen, a Danish nobleman and author of a slightly earlier history of Denmark than Saxo's, describes his contemporary, Saxo, as his contubernalis, meaning tent-comrade. This gives evidence that Saxo and Sven might have soldiered in the Hird or royal guard, since Sven used the word contubernium in reference to them. There is also a Saxo to be found on a list of clergy at Lund, where there was a Sven recorded as Archdeacon. Likewise there is Dean Saxo who died in 1190; however, the date does not match what is known about Saxo.

Both arguments, for a secular or religious Saxo, would confirm that he was well educated; as clergy, he would have received training in Latin and sons of great men were often sent to Paris. Saxo comes from a warrior family and writes that he is himself committed to being a soldier. He tells us that he follows "the ancient right of hereditary service", and that his father and grandfather "were recognized frequenters of your renowned sire's (Valdemar I) war camp".

Saxo's education and ability support the idea that he was educated outside Denmark. Some suggest the title "Grammaticus" refers not to his education but rather his elaborate Latin style. We know from his writing that he was in the retinue and received the patronage of Absalon, Archbishop of Lund, who was the foremost adviser to King Valdemar I. In his will Absalon forgives his clerk Saxo a small debt of two and a half marks of silver and tells him to return two borrowed books to the monastery of Sorø. The legacy of Saxo Grammaticus is the sixteen-book heroic history of the Danes called Gesta Danorum.

== Gesta Danorum ==
In the preface to the work, Saxo writes that his patron Absalon (c. 1128 – 21 March 1201), Archbishop of Lund, had encouraged him to write a heroic history of the Danes. The history is thought to have been started about 1185, after Sven Aggesen wrote his history. The goal of Gesta Danorum was, as Saxo writes, "to glorify our fatherland", which he accomplishes on the model of Virgil's Aeneid. Saxo also may have owed much to Plato and Cicero, as well as to more contemporary writers like Geoffrey of Monmouth.

Saxo's history of the Danes was compiled from sources that are of questionable historical value but were to him the only ones extant. He drew on oral tales of the Icelanders, ancient volumes, letters carved on rocks and stone, and the statements of his patron Absalon concerning the history of which the Archbishop had been a part. Saxo's work was not strictly a history or a simple record of old tales, but rather, as Friis-Jensen puts it, "a product of Saxo's own mind and times". Westergaard writes that Saxo combines the history and mythology of the heroic age of Denmark, and reworks it into his own story that exemplifies the past of the Danes.

The history is composed of sixteen books, and extends from the time of the founders of the Danish people, Dan I of Denmark and Angul, into about the year 1187. The first four books are concerned with the history of the Danes before Christ, the next four books with their history after Christ, and books 9–12 with Christian Denmark, and books 13–16 promote Lund and exploits before and during Saxo's own lifetime. It is assumed that the last eight books were written first, as Saxo drew heavily on the work of Absalon (who died in 1201, before the work was completed) for evidence of the age of Saint Canute and Valdemar I.

The first eight volumes share a likeness with the works of Saxo's contemporary Snorri Sturluson. They deal with mythical elements such as giants and the Scandinavian pantheon of gods. Saxo tells of Dan the first king of Denmark, who had a brother named Angul who gave his name to the Angles. He also tells the stories of various other Danish heroes, many of whom interact with the Scandinavian gods. Saxo's "heathen" gods, however, are not always good characters. They are sometimes treacherous, such as in the story of Harald, legendary king of the Danes, who was taught the ways of warfare by Odin and then was betrayed and killed by the god, who then brought him to Valhalla.

Saxo's world is seen to have had very warlike values. He glorifies the heroes that made their names in battle far more than those who made peace. His view of the period of peace under King Frode is very low and is only satisfied when King Knut brings back the ancestral customs. Saxo's chronology of kings extends up to Saint Canute and his son Valdemar I. Saxo finished the history with the Preface, which he wrote last, in c. 1216 under the patronage of Anders Sunesen, who replaced Absalon as Archbishop of Lund. Saxo included in the preface warm appreciation of both Archbishops and of the reigning King Valdemar II.

== Historical contribution ==
Of particular interest for Shakespeare scholars is the story of Amleth, the first instance of the playwright's Hamlet. Saxo based the story on an oral tale of a son taking revenge for his murdered father.

Christiern Pedersen, a Canon of Lund, collaborated with Jodocus Badius Ascensius, a fellow enthusiast, to print the work of Saxo Grammaticus early in the sixteenth century. This was the first major step toward securing the historical significance of Gesta Danorum. Starting from that point, the knowledge of it began to spread within the academic community. Oliver Elton, who was the first to translate the first nine books of Gesta Danorum into English, wrote that Saxo was the first writer produced by Denmark.

Saxo's skill as a Latinist was praised by Erasmus, who wondered how "a Dane of that age got so great power of eloquence". Later R. W. Chambers would call Saxo's writings "difficult and bombastic, but always amusing Latin". There have been many attempts to understand the type of Latin language used by Saxo, and to juxtapose it in history, to provide more information on where he was educated. Some have considered his Latin to have more in common with legal than with ecclesiastical training, and his poetry is thought to have traces of parallelism.

Although Saxo is commonly viewed by modern Danes as their "first national historian", two other coherent accounts of Danish history by Danish authors predate Gesta Danorum. They are Chronicon Roskildense (English: Roskilde Chronicle), a small work written in Latin, completed in c. 1143, spanning from the introduction of Christianity in Denmark to the author's own time. The next to be published was Brevis historia regum Dacie, written by Sven Aggesen (b. c. 1140–1150 – death unknown), thought to have been finished in 1186 or 1187 (the last event described happened in 1185), covering the years 300–1185.

Saxo's works were received enthusiastically by Renaissance era scholars, who were curious about the pre-Christian history and legends. Saxo's portrayals of history have been seen to differ greatly from those of his contemporaries, especially Norwegian and Icelandic, including portrayals of various historical characters as either heroes or villains. There are also differences between Saxo's work and that of the fellow Danish historian Sven Aggesen from the same era.

These differences have to do with Saxo's elaboration and euhemerism in his descriptions of mainly Scandinavian history and mythology, Saxo's account on the tale of Thyri, for instance, is considered to be far more fantastic than the same tale presented by Aggesen. Saxo's work has been criticized for this reason. Kurt Johannesson's studies expanded greatly on the comprehension of Gesta Danorum, deviating from the approach that focuses mostly on mythology, and allowing the development of a wider understanding of Saxo's works.

Recently some scholars, such as Sigurd Kværndrup, inspired by Johannesson's study of the four cardinal virtues in Gesta Danorum, have studied other elaborations and schemes in the writings of Saxo. Some of them have concluded that Saxo, instead of simply distorting allegedly true Nordic and Baltic traditions and/or beliefs, was creating something new, attuned to the approaching 13th century Danish race to strengthen institutions and engage in the Northern Crusades.

Importantly, Saxo Grammaticus appears to have changed his agenda after the death of his patron Absalon in 1202. What eventually came to be the first nine books of Gesta Danorum, were actually written after the death of Absalon, and they focus largely on mythology, for which Saxo has been criticized. The contrast to the seven books written during the lifetime of Absalon is "'enormous,' leading the main core of scholars to divide the two parts into mythical (books I–IX) and historical (books X–XVI), the last of the historical books being based on Absalon's memories. "Therefore, we prefer to support the composition order of Gesta Danorum as X–XVI, followed by I–IX, and ending with the preface", says historian André Muceniecks.

== See also ==
- 10462 Saxogrammaticus, asteroid

== Editions ==
- Grammaticus, Saxo (1894), Elton, Oliver; Powell, Frederick York (eds.), The First Nine Books of the Danish History of Saxo Grammaticus, David Nutt : London
- Grammaticus, Saxo (1905), Elton, Oliver; Powell, Frederick York; Anderson, Rasmus B.; Buel, J.W. (eds.), The Nine Books of the Danish History of Saxo Grammaticus in Two Volumes, Norroena Society
  - In two volumes : Volume 1, 1905 ; Volume 2, 1905
  - e-text THE DANISH HISTORY, BOOKS I-IX e-text from Elton's 1905 edition via www.gutenberg.org
- Davidson, Hilda Ellis, ed. (1979), Saxo Grammaticus: The History of the Danes, Book I-IX, vol. I: Text, translated by Fisher, Peter, Cambridge: D. S. Brewer
- Davidson, Hilda Ellis, ed. (1980), Saxo Grammaticus: The History of the Danes, Book I-IX, vol. II: Commentary, translated by Fisher, Peter, Cambridge: D. S. Brewer
- Christiansen, Eric, ed. (1980–81), Danorum Regum Heroumque Historia, Books X-XVI. The Text of the first edition with translation and commentary in three volumes, Oxford: British Archaeological Reports
- Friis-Jensen, Karsten, ed. (2015), Saxo Grammaticus: The History of the Danes, vol. 1: Books I-X, translated by Fisher, Peter, Oxford: Clarendon Press
- Friis-Jensen, Karsten, ed. (2015), Saxo Grammaticus: The History of the Danes, vol. 2: Books XI-XVI, translated by Fisher, Peter, Oxford: Clarendon Press

== Bibliography ==
- Amory, Frederic (July 1989), "Saxo Grammaticus as Latin Poet: studies in the Verse Passages of the 'Gesta Danorum' by Karsten Friis-Jensen", Speculum (review), 64 (3): 701–706, doi:10.2307/2854215, JSTOR 2854215
- Chisholm, Hugh, ed. (1911). "Saxo Grammaticus" . Encyclopædia Britannica (11th ed.). Cambridge University Press.
- Christiansen, Eric (April 1981), "Saxo Grammaticus, The History of the Danes, Vol. I by Peter Fisher, Hilda Ellis Davidson", The English Historical Review (review), 96 (379): 382–385, doi:10.1093/ehr/XCVI.CCCLXXIX.382, JSTOR 568298
- Dumézil, Georges (1973), Coltman, Derek (ed.), From Myth to Fiction: The Saga of Hadingus, Chicago: University of Chicago Press
- Friis-Jensen, Karsten (2006), Mortensen, Lars Boje (ed.), "In the Presence of the Dead. Saint Canute the Duke in Saxo Grammaticus's Gesta Danorum", The Making of Christian Myths in the Periphery of Latin Christendom (c. 1000–1300), Copenhagen: Museum Tusculanum Press, pp. 195–216
- Johannesson, Kurt (1978), Saxo Grammaticus: Komposition och världsbild i Gesta Danorum, Stockholm: Lychnos-Bibliotek
- Jones, Gwyn (1968), A History of the Vikings, London: Oxford University Press
- Kværndrup, Sigurd (1999), Tolv principper hos Saxo: En tolkning af danernes bedrifter (in Danish), Copenhagen: Multivers Aps Forlag
- Malone, Kemp (January 1958), "Primitivism in Saxo Grammaticus", Journal of the History of Ideas, 19 (1): 94–104, doi:10.2307/2707955, JSTOR 2707955
- Muceniecks, Andre (2017), Saxo Grammaticus: Hierocratical Conceptions and Danish Hegemony in the Thirteenth Century, Kalamazoo & Bradford: ARC Humanities Press
- Muir, Kenneth (Autumn 1984), "Saxo Grammaticus and the Life of Hamlet: A Translation, History and Commentary. By William F. Hansen", Shakespeare Quarterly (review), 35 (3): 370–372, doi:10.2307/2870387, JSTOR 2870387
- Remy, Arthur (1913). "Saxo Grammaticus" . In Herbermann, Charles (ed.). Catholic Encyclopedia. New York: Robert Appleton Company.
- Sawyer, P. H. (1982), Kings and Vikings: Scandinavia and Europe AD 700-1100, New York: Methuen & Co.
- Westergaard, Waldemar (June 1952), "Danish History and Danish Historians", The Journal of Modern History, 24 (2): 167–180, doi:10.1086/237500, JSTOR 1872564, S2CID 143180277
