= Peter Erasmus Müller =

- Bishop of Zealand
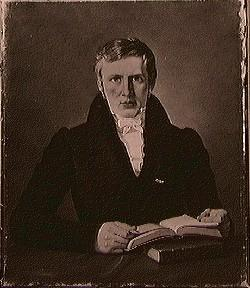
- Portrait by C. A. Jensen from 1835.
- Church: Church of Denmark
- Diocese: Diocese of Zealand
- In office: 1830–1834
- Predecessor: Friedrich Münter
- Successor: Jacob Peter Mynster

Personal details
- Born: May 29, 1776 Copenhagen, Denmark
- Died: September 4, 1834 (aged 58)
- Denomination: Lutheranism
- Children: Adam August Müller; Ludvig Müller; Otto Müller
- Education: University of Copenhagen

Peter Erasmus Müller (29 May 1776 – 4 September 1834), was a Danish historian, linguist, theologian, and bishop of the Diocese of Zealand from 1830 until his death.

== Career ==
Müller studied at the University of Copenhagen, where he passed his theological examination in 1791. After spending some time at various German universities, he visited France and England. Returning to Denmark, he wrote numerous works and was appointed professor of theology at the University of Copenhagen in 1801. During his time as a professor, he produced a large number of essays and books about theology, history, and linguistics. As a result of the fame these works earned him, he was appointed a member of the Royal Danish Academy of Sciences and Letters in 1811 and joined the Arnamagnæan Institute in 1815.

Following the death of Friedrich Münter in 1830, he was appointed the Bishop of Zealand, the highest ecclesiastical dignity in Denmark at the time. He held the position for only four years, as Müller died in 1834 after a long period of illness.

== Works ==
In his time as a professor of theology, Müller wrote a variety of essays which, though many were intended as instructional materials for his students, gained him acclaim as a theologian. He also wrote academically about history and linguistics. The most notable of these works include:

- De hierarchia et studio vitæ asceticæ in sacris et mysteriis Græcorum Romanorumqve latentibus (1803)
- Kristeligt Moralsystem (1808)
- Kristelig Apologetik (1810)
- Om Kilderne til Saxos 9 første bøger og deres Troværdighed (1823)
- System i den kristelige Dogmatik (1826)
- Dansk Synonymik eller forklaring af enstydige danske Ord (1829)

In the academic world, Müller was perhaps best known for his study of the nordic sagas. His works concerning nordic mythology include:

- Antikvarisk Undersøgelse over de ved Gallehus fundne Guldhorn (1806)
- Sagabibliothek (three volumes, 1810–1818)
- Om Avthentien af Snorres Edda og beviset derfra kan hentes for Asalærens Ægthed (1812).
- Om det islandske Sprogs Vigtighed (1813)
- Undersøgelse om Kilderne til Snorros Heimskringla og disses Troværdighed (1820)
- Kritisk Undersögelse af Danmarks og Norges Sagnhistorie (1823–1830)

Müller also authored two biographies:

- Vita Andreæ Sunonis, archiepiscopi Lundensis (1830)
- Vita Lagonis Urne, episcopi Roskildensis (1831)

== Personal life and family ==
Müller was born in Copenhagen to Frederik Adam Müller (1725–1795) and Marthe Sophie Garboe. His mother died in 1780, when Peter Erasmus was only four years old. Because his father was a renowned collector of copper engravings, chalcography, and books, Münter had access to a wide breath of knowledge. He had been taught by private tutors and had a relatively isolated childhood as a result. His brother, Adam Gottlob Müller (1769–1833), was a member of the Danish Supreme Court.

In 1805, he married Louise Augusta Stub (1778–1852), the granddaughter of Christian Gottlieb Kratzenstein. The couple had three sons and a daughter. Their first son, Otto Frederik Müller (1807–1882) became a member of the Supreme Court and was the father of Peter Lange-Müller. Their second son, Carl Ludvig Müller (1809–1891), was a numismatist and the father of Sophus Müller. The couple's youngest son, Adam August Müller, was a renowned painter.

== Notes ==
- Ripley, George; Dana, Charles A., eds. (1879). "Müller, Peder Erasmus" . The American Cyclopædia.
