= Danegeld =

Tax raised to pay tribute to Viking raiders

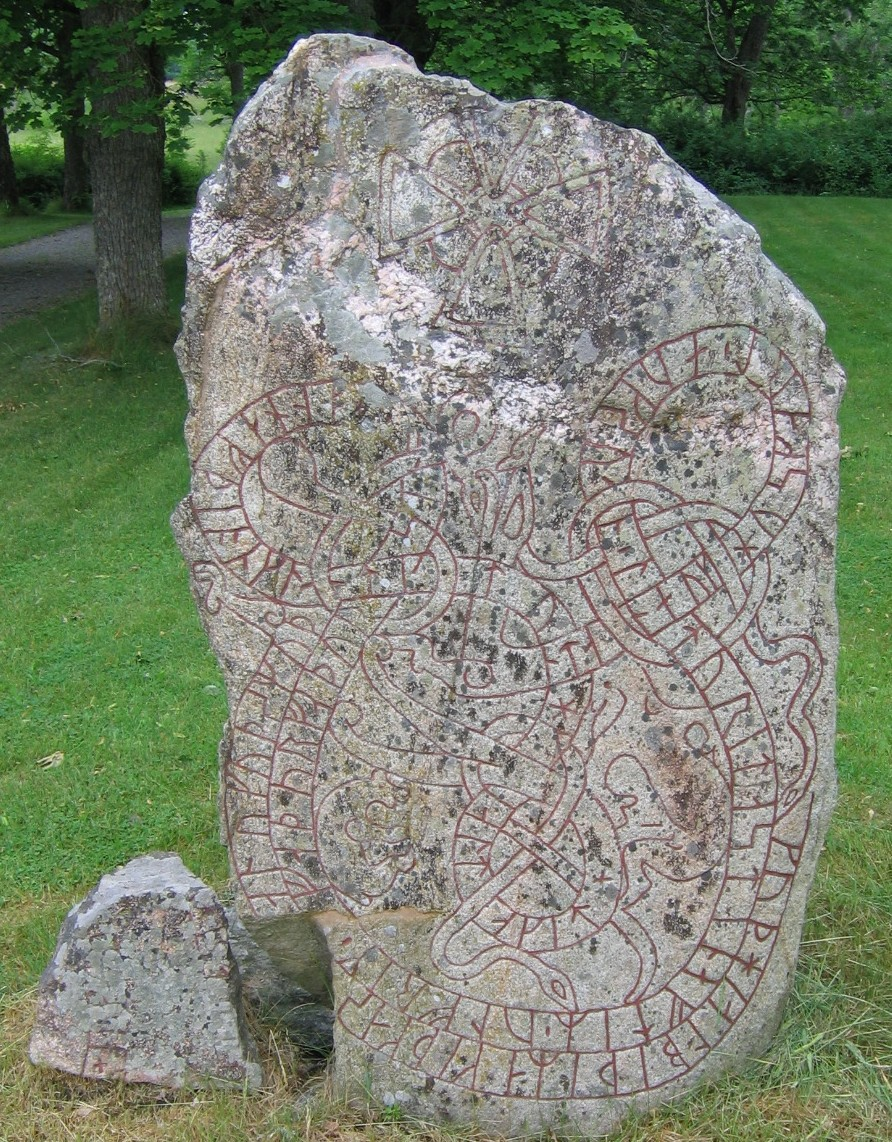
The runestone U 241 in Lingsberg, Uppland, Sweden, was raised by the grandchildren of Ulfríkr circa 1050 in commemoration of his twice receiving Danegeld in England.

Danegeld (/ˈdeɪnɡɛld/; literally "Dane yield") was a tax raised to pay tribute or protection money to the Viking raiders to save a land from being ravaged. It was called the geld or gafol in eleventh-century sources. It was characteristic of royal policy in both England and Francia during the ninth through eleventh centuries, collected both as tributary, to buy off the attackers, and as stipendiary, to pay the defensive forces. The term Danegeld did not appear until the late eleventh century. In Anglo-Saxon England tribute payments to the Danes was known as gafol and the levy raised to support the standing army, for the defence of the realm, was known as heregeld (army-tax).

== England ==
In England, a hide was notionally an area of land sufficient to support one family, but their true size and economic value varied enormously. The hide's purpose was as a unit of assessment and was the basis for the land-tax that became known as Danegeld. Initially it was levied as a tribute to buy off Viking invaders but after the Danish Conquest of 1016 it was retained as a permanent land-tax to pay for the realm's defence. The Viking expeditions to England were usually led by the Danish kings, but they were composed of warriors from all over Scandinavia, and they eventually brought home more than 100 tonnes of silver.

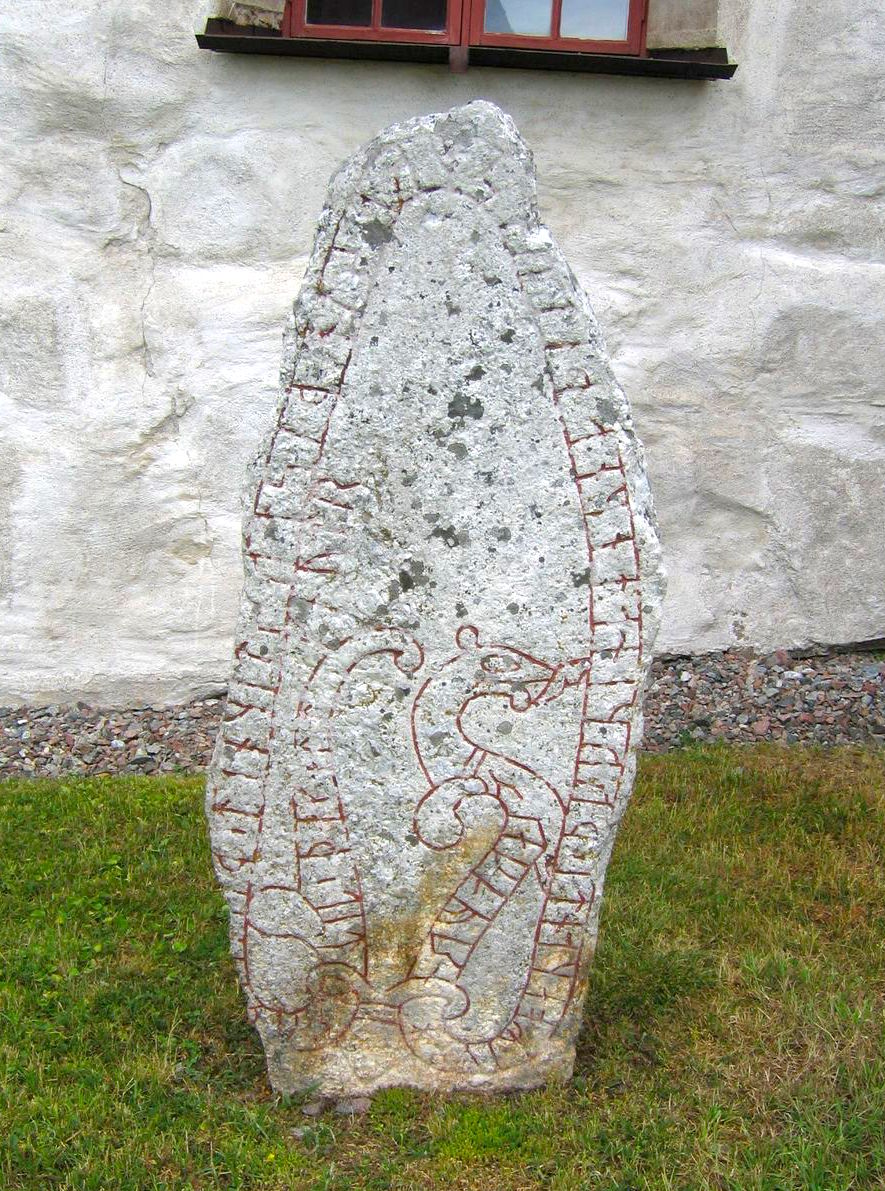
The runestone U 344 in Orkesta, Uppland, Sweden, raised in memory of the Viking Ulf of Borresta, says that three times he had taken Danegeld in England. The first one was with Skagul Toste, the second one with Thorkell the Tall and the last one with Canute the Great.

Although the tribute payments made to the Vikings, prior to the Norman Conquest, are commonly known as Danegeld, the payments were at the time actually called gafol, meaning "tax" or "tribute". (Note: Gafol, gyld and in one instance heregild appear in the Anglo-Saxon Chronicle (ASC). Details on some of the payments are in the ASC MS C, D and E for the years 991, 994, 1002, 1006, 1007, 1009, 1011, 1012, 1013, 1018. (English translation at "Project Gutenberg".).) In 1012 Æthelred the Unready introduced an annual land tax to pay for a force of Scandinavian mercenaries, led by Thorkell the Tall, to help defend the realm. Following Æthelred the kings of England used the same tax collection method to fund their own standing armies; this was known as heregeld (army-tax). Heregeld was abolished by Edward the Confessor in 1051. It was the Norman administration who called the tax Danegeld.

=== Anglo-Saxon era ===
An English payment of 10,000 Roman pounds (3,300 kg) of silver was first made in 991 following the Viking victory at the Battle of Maldon in Essex, when Æthelred was advised by Sigeric, Archbishop of Canterbury, and the aldermen of the south-western provinces to buy off the Vikings rather than continue the armed struggle. One manuscript of the Anglo-Saxon Chronicle said Olav Tryggvason led the Viking forces.

In 994 the Danes, under King Swein Forkbeard and Olav Tryggvason, returned and unsuccessfully laid siege to London. They then ravaged the south-east until they were bought off by a tribute of 16,000 pounds.

Further payments were made in 1002, and in 1007 Æthelred bought two years peace with the Danes for 36,000 troy pounds (13,400 kg) of silver. In 1012, following the capture and murder of the Archbishop of Canterbury, and the sack of Canterbury, the Danes were bought off with another 48,000 troy pounds (17,900 kg) of silver.

In 1016 Sweyn Forkbeard's son, Canute, became King of England. After two years he felt sufficiently in control of his new kingdom to the extent of being able to pay off all but 40 ships of his invasion fleet, which were retained as a personal bodyguard, with a huge Danegeld of 72,000 troy pounds (26,900 kg) of silver collected nationally, plus a further 10,500 pounds (3,900 kg) of silver collected from London.

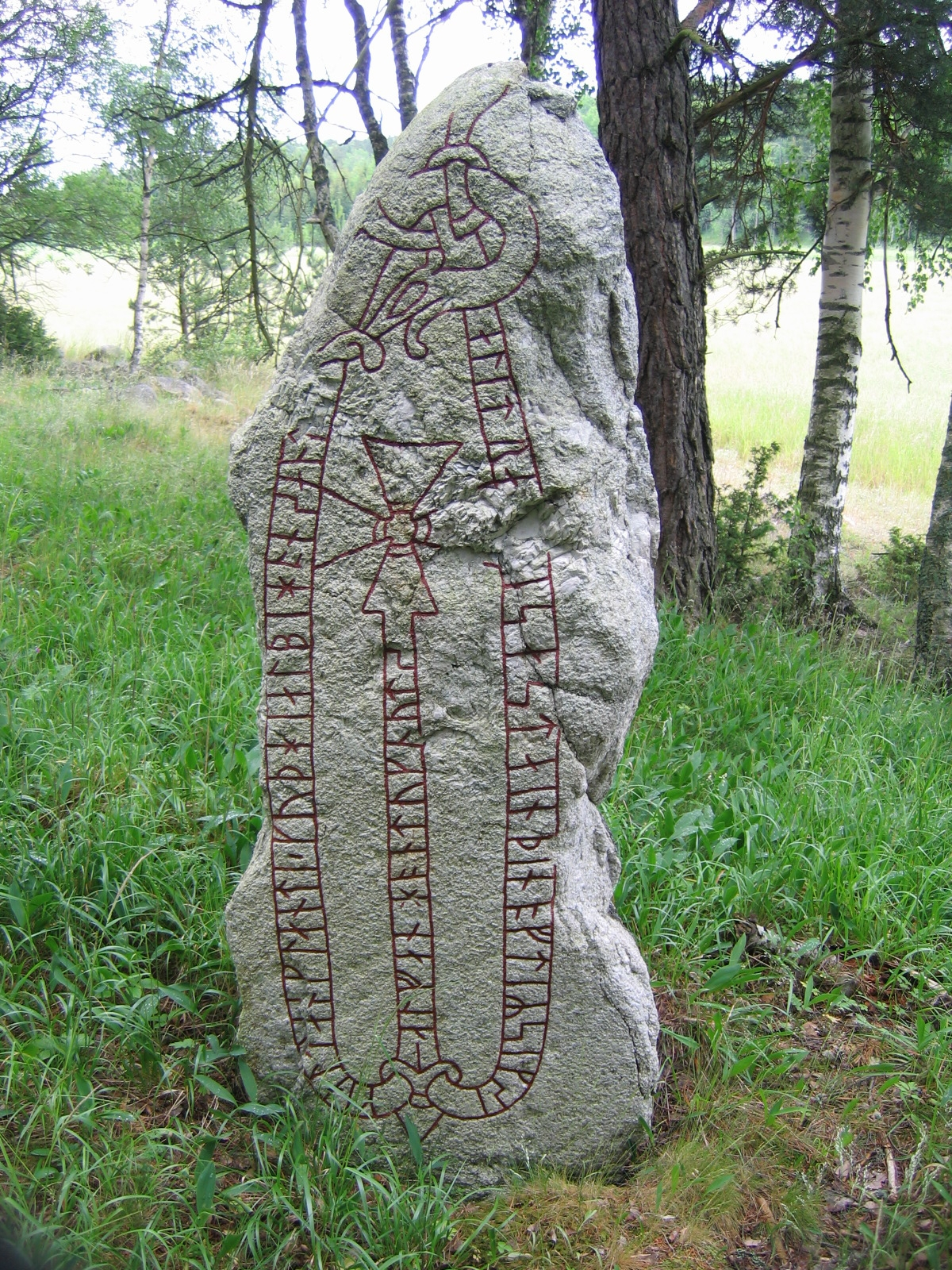
The runestone U 194, in a grove near Väsby, Uppland, Sweden, was raised by a Viking in commemoration of his receiving one Danegeld in England.

This kind of extorted tribute was not unique to England: according to Snorri Sturluson and Rimbert, Finland, Estonia and Latvia (see also Grobin, now Grobiņa) paid the same kind of tribute to the Swedes. In fact, the Primary Chronicle relates that the regions paying protection money extended east towards Moscow, until the Finnic and Slavic tribes rebelled and drove the Varangians overseas. Similarly, the Sami peoples were frequently forced to pay tribute in the form of pelts. A similar procedure also existed in Iberia, where the contemporary Christian states were largely supported on tribute gold from the taifa kingdoms. (Note: The taifa kingdoms paid parias, a tribute in lieu of raids (razzias).)

It is estimated that the total amount of money paid by the Anglo-Saxons amounted to some sixty million pence, and at the farm where the runestone Sö 260 talks of a voyage in the West, a hoard of several hundred English coins was found.

=== Norman era ===
In southern England the Danegeld was based on hidages, an area of agricultural land sufficient to support a family, with the exception of Kent, (Note: The former Kingdom of Kent maintained many endemic traditions.) where the unit was a sulung of four yokes, the amount of land that could be ploughed in a season by a team of oxen; in the north the typical unit was the carucate, or ploughland, equivalent to Kent's sulung; and East Anglia was assessed by the hundred. Everywhere the tax was farmed (collected) by local sheriffs. Records of assessment and income pre-date the Norman conquest, indicating a system which James Campbell describes as "old, but not unchanging". According to David Bates, it was "a national tax of a kind unknown in western Europe"; indeed, J. A. Green asserts that the national system of land taxation developed to raise the Danegeld was the first to reappear in Western Europe since the collapse of the Western Roman Empire. It was used by William the Conqueror as the principal tool for underwriting continental wars, as well as providing for royal appetites and the costs of conquest, rather than for buying-off the Viking menace. He and his successors levied the geld more frequently than the Anglo-Saxon kings, and at higher rates; the six-shilling geld of 1084 is infamous, and the geld in Ely of 1096, for example, was double its normal rate. Judith Green states that from 1110, war and the White Ship calamity led to further increases in taxation efforts. By 1130 Henry I was taxing the Danegeld annually, at two shillings on the hide. That year, according to the chronicle of John of Worcester the king promised to suspend the Danegeld for seven years, a promise renewed by Stephen at his coronation but which was afterwards broken. Henry II revived the Danegeld in 1155–1156, but 1161–1162 marks the last year the Danegeld was recorded on a pipe roll, and the tax fell into disuse.

The importance of the Danegeld to the Exchequer may be assessed by its return of about £2400 in 1129–1130, which was about ten per cent of the total (about £23,000) paid that year.

Judged by an absolute rather than a contemporary standard, there is much to criticise in the collection of the Danegeld by the early 12th century: it was based on ancient assessments of land productivity, and there were numerous privileged reductions or exemptions, granted as marks of favour that served to cast those left paying it in an "unfavoured" light: "Exemptions were very much a matter of royal favour, and were adjusted to meet changing circumstances ... in this way Danegeld was a more flexible instrument of taxation than most historians have been prepared to allow." Henry I granted tax liberties to London in 1133, and exempted the city from taxes such as scot, Danegeld, and murdrum. From the late twelfth century, a levy on moveables, which required the consent of parliament, replaced the geld. The principle of "no consent, but exemption", gave way to that of "consent, but no exemption".

== Francia ==
=== Brittany ===
That a country-wide Danegeld was ever collected in the Duchy of Brittany is uncertain. Certainly they were paid off on more than one occasion, and such payouts may have included money (besides other valuables), but the imposition of a tax on the people to pay either a stipend or a tribute is not recorded in the sources, although it is possible that some monies were raised this way. It is more likely that purely local Danegeld were raised in times of emergency. In 847 the Breton leader Nominoe was defeated three times by some Danish Vikings before finally opening negotiations with their leaders and enticing them to leave by offering them gifts, as recorded in the contemporary Annales Bertiniani:

Dani partem inferioris Galliae quam Brittones incolunt adeuntes, ter cum eisdem bellantes, superant; Nomenogiusque victus cum suis fugit, dein [per] legatos muneribus a suis eos sedibus amovit.

A smaller group of Danes left Gaul intending to settle among the Bretons. Thrice doing battle with the same, they overcame them. The vanquished Nominoe fled with his own, then through messengers bearing gifts removed the same Danes from their settlements.

The possibility that the Danes were bought off by methods other than the raising of cash is raised by an incident in 869, recorded in the aforementioned Annales and by Regino of Prüm. In that year Salomon, King of Brittany, put an end to some pagan raids by payment of five hundred heads of cattle.

The more local type of Danegeld is exemplified by two chronologically close events in the County of Vannes. According to a record in the cartulary of Redon Abbey, the bishop Courantgenus was ransomed from Viking captivity in 854. His ransom was quite probably raised on a local level. In 855 the monks of Redon had to ransom the count, Pascwet, from a similar captivity by handing over a chalice and a paten, weighing together sixty-seven solidi in gold. Sometime later Pascwet managed to redeem the sacred vessels from the pagans, and this payment too may have been raised as a sort of Danegeld. Certainly, according to Regino of Prüm, Pascwet later (in 873) paid a stipendiary Danegeld of an undisclosed amount to hire as mercenaries some Vikings with which to harass his opponent for the ducal throne of Brittany, Vurfand, Count of Rennes.

=== East Francia ===
The most important Danegeld raised in East Francia was that used by Charles the Fat to end the Siege of Elsloo and convert the Viking leader Godfrid into a Christian and a Duke of Frisia (882). Local Danegeld may have been raised in the Eastern kingdom as needed, such as by one Evesa to ransom her son, Count Eberhard, at a "very great price" in 880, according to Regino of Prüm.

=== Frisia ===
The first Danegeld ever raised was collected in Frisia in 810. In that year a Danish fleet of some two hundred vessels landed in Frisia, harassing first all the coastal islands and then the mainland before defeating the Frisians in three battles. The victorious Danes then demanded a large tribute from the conquered. Soon after, a report was sent to Charlemagne, then at Aachen contemplating a campaign against the Danish king, Godfred, stating that the Frisians had already collected through taxation and paid a sum of one hundred pounds of silver. These events are recorded in the Annales regni Francorum and the Vita Karoli Magni, both works of Charlemagne's court historian, Einhard, and in the separate Reichsannalen called the Annales Mettenses and the Annales Maximiniani, as well as the work of the so-called "Poeta Saxo". The total sum paid out is unknown, but it was without doubt raised through taxes, as Einhard in his Vita explicitly says: "And the victorious Danes imposed a tribute on the vanquished, by means of taxes one hundred pounds of silver from the Frisians is already released" (Danosque victores tributum victis inposuisse, et vectigalis nomine centum libras argenti a Frisionibus iam esse solutas).

No further Danegeld was collected in Frisia until late in the reign of Louis the Pious (died 840). In 836 some Northmen, having burnt Antwerp and the marketplace at Wintla (modern Fintel), agreed to leave on the payment of some tribute, the amount of which the Annales Fuldenses do not specify. In 837, either because the Frisians were unprepared or defected from their Frankish overlords, some Vikings managed to land on Walcheren, capture several counts and other leading men and kill them or hold them for ransom. They then proceeded to exact a census wherever they could, funnelling an "infinite" amount of money "of diverse kinds" into their coffers. They then moved to the mainland, where they assaulted Dorestad and extorted a tribute from the population of the region before leaving. This event is recorded in the Annales Fuldenses, Annales Bertiniani, Annales Xantenses, and the Vita Hludowici imperatoris of Thegan of Trier. In 846, during the reign of Louis's son Lothair I, the Vikings compelled the Frisians to collect a census to pay them off. The Bertiniani and Xantenses annals record how Lothair, though aware of the outrage, was unable to stop it, and the Vikings left Frisia laden with booty and captives.

The last recorded Danegeld raised by the Frisians was paid in 852. In that year 252 Viking ships laid anchor off the Frisian coast and demanded tribute (of what kind we do not know), which was procured. Their demands met, the Vikings left without devastating the territory, as recorded in the Annales Bertiniani and the Miracula sancti Bavonis, a life of Saint Bavo. That these various Viking impositions were paid by the taxation of the Frisians is made evident in a record of events in 873. In that year, according to the annals Fuldenses, Bertiniani, and Xantenses, the Viking leader Rodulf sent messengers to the Ostergau calling for tribute. The Frisians replied that they owed taxes only to their king, Louis the German, and his sons (Carloman, Louis, and Charles), and a battle ensued, in which Rodulf was killed and his troops routed. One later, tenth-century source, Dudo of Saint-Quentin's De moribus et actis primorum Normanniae ducum, records that Rollo forced the Frisians to pay tribute, but this is unlikely. All the various Frisian Danegeld was purely local in nature, raised by the local leaders and the people without royal aid or approval.

=== Lotharingia ===
In Lotharingia the Danegeld was only collected once. In 864 Lothair II exacted four denarii from every mansus in the kingdom, as well as large number of cattle and much flour, wine, and beer. (Note: Joranson 1923, p. 239, and n. 2, indicates that the word generally translated "beer", sicera, is derived from ancient Hebrew and can refer to any alcoholic beverage that is not wine. It has been translated as sherbet.) The whole amount is not recorded, nor whether it was paid as a stipend or as a tribute, but it was paid to a Viking band led by one Rodulf. It has been suggested that Lothair was imitating the example set by Charles the Bald in 860, when he hired the Vikings of Weland to attack those encamped on the island of Oscellus in the Seine. Neither the reason for Lothair's payment nor the result is recorded in the only source to mention it, the contemporary Annales Bertiniani:

Hlotharius, Hlotharii filius, de omni regno suo quattuor denarios ex omni manso colligens, summam denariorum cum multa pensione farinae atque pecorum necnon vini ac sicerae Rodulfo Normanno, Herioldi filio, ac suis locarii nomine tribuit.

Lothair, son of Lothair, collecting from his whole kingdom four denarii from every mansus, allotted the sum of the denarii with a great payment of flour and cattle and even wine and beer to the Northman Rodulf, son of Heriold, and to his hirelings.

There is also a story told by Dudo of Saint-Quentin in his De moribus et actis primorum Normanniae ducum of how Reginar Langhals was ransomed by his wife in 880 for all the gold in Hainault, but this is probably a legend.

=== West Francia ===
The first payment of the Danegeld to the Vikings in West Francia took place in 845 when, under Ragnar Lothbrok, they tried to attack Paris. The Viking army was bought off from destroying the city by a massive payment of nearly six tons of silver and gold bullion. In November 858 a Danegeld was being collected, probably to pay off Bjørn (Berno), who had ravaged the Seine and its district for the whole previous year (857).

In 862 two groups of Vikings—one the larger of two fleets recently forced out of the Seine by Charles the Bald, the other a fleet returning from a Mediterranean expedition—converged on Brittany, where one (the Mediterranean group) was hired by the Breton duke Salomon to ravage the Loire valley. Robert the Strong, Margrave of Neustria, captured twelve of their ships, killing all on board save a few who fled. He then opened negotiations with the former Seine Vikings, and hired them against Salomon for 6,000 pounds of silver. The purpose of this was doubtless to prevent them from entering the service of Salomon. (Note: Robert probably expected Salomon to hire them to replace the defeated Mediterranean Vikings, then to attack Neustria from two sides, with the Viking ships ascending the Loire and Breton troops invading by land.) Probably Robert had to collect a large amount in taxes to finance what was effectively a non-tributary Danegeld designed to keep the Vikings out of Neustria. (Note: In 860–861 Charles the Bald had collected a general tax to pay a Danegeld of 5,000 pounds. The king had probably authorised Robert's payment.) The treaty between the Franks and the Vikings did not last more than a year: in 863 Salomon made peace and the Vikings, deprived of an enemy, ravaged Neustria.

== Kievan Rus ==
In Kievan Rus during the rule of the Rus people (from where the name Russia derives), the Ilmen' Slavs, Krivichs, Chud, Merya and Ves' had to pay an annual tribute or tax to the Rus Vikings known as the dan before driving them out. Prince Oleg, who was a relative of Rurik, after moving to Kiev, imposed a dan on the people of Novgorod of 300 griveni / per year "for the preservation of peace". The payments to Kiev continued until 1054 with the death of Prince Jaroslav of Kiev. When Prince Oleg made his expedition against Constantinople in 907, he demanded that the Romans "pay tribute to his men on his 2,000 ships at the rate of 12 griveni per man, 40 men reckoned to a ship". The treaty negotiated between Oleg and the Roman Emperor Leo VI the Wise committed the emperor to pay 1 grivna to every man on Oleg's ships in exchange for going away. According to the Russian chronicles, the followers of Prince Igor in 945 :

... said to him "The servants of Sveiald are adorned with weapons and fine raiment, but we are naked. Go forth with us, oh Prince, that you and we may profit thereby.” Igor heeded their words and attacked Dereva in search of tribute (dan). He demanded the previous tribute and collected by violence from the people with the assistance of his followers....

== Legacy ==
=== In literature ===
William Shakespeare made reference to Danish tribute in Hamlet, Prince of Denmark, Act 3, scene 1 (King Claudius is talking of Prince Hamlet's insanity):

... he shall with speed to England,
For the demand of our neglected tribute

Danegeld is the subject of the poem "Dane-geld" by Rudyard Kipling, whose most famous lines are "once you have paid him the Danegeld/ You never get rid of the Dane." The poem ends thus:

It is wrong to put temptation in the path of any nation,
For fear they should succumb and go astray;
So when you are requested to pay up or be molested,
You will find it better policy to say: –

"We never pay any-one Dane-geld,
No matter how trifling the cost;
For the end of that game is oppression and shame,
And the nation that plays it is lost!"

Kipling's poem was set to music by filk musician Leslie Fish on her 1991 album, The Undertaker's Horse.

=== In politics ===
In the United Kingdom, the term "Danegeld" has come to refer to a general warning and a criticism of any coercive payment, whether in money or kind. For example, as mentioned in the British House of Commons during the debate on the Belfast Agreement:

I feared that the Belfast agreement might be built on sand, but I hoped otherwise. But as we have seen, Danegeld has been paid, and the thing about Danegeld is that one keeps on having to pay it. Concession after concession has been made. What will be the next one?

To emphasise the point, people often quote Kipling's poem "Dane-Geld", especially its two most famous lines. For example, journalist Tony Parsons quoted the poem in The Daily Mirror, when criticising the Rome daily La Repubblica for writing "Ransom was paid and that is nothing to be ashamed of", in response to the announcement that the Italian government paid $1 million for the release of two hostages in Iraq in October 2004.

In Britain the phrase is often coupled with the experience of Chamberlain's appeasement of Hitler. (Note: "There are many examples of appeasement in history, whether it be the Danegeld or more recently, and we know that appeasement does not work." (Mr Brady. "House of Commons Hansard Debates for 25 Jan 2000 (pt 30) Column 233".)) On 22 July 1939, two British newspapers, The Daily Telegraph and the News Chronicle, reported that Robert Hudson of the Department of Overseas Trade had visited the German Embassy in London two days before, to meet the German Ambassador Herbert von Dirksen and Helmuth Wohlthat of the Four Year Plan organisation, to offer Germany a huge loan worth hundreds of millions of pound sterling in exchange for not attacking Poland. The media reaction to Hudson's proposed loan was overwhelmingly negative with the newspapers calling Hudson's plan "paying the Danegeld". Much to Hudson's humiliation, Chamberlain announced in the House of Commons that Hudson was acting on his own, and Britain would not offer Germany any such loan as a solution to the Danzig crisis.
