= Rodulf Haraldsson =

Viking leader

Rodulf Haraldsson (died June 873), sometimes Rudolf, from Old Norse Hróðulfr, was a Viking leader who raided the British Isles, West Francia, Frisia, and Lotharingia in the 860s and 870s. He was a son of Harald the Younger and thus a nephew of Rorik of Dorestad, and a relative of both Harald Klak and Godfrid Haraldsson, but he was "the black sheep of the family". He was baptised, but under what circumstances is unknown. His career is obscure, but similar accounts are found in the three major series of Reichsannalen from the period: the Annales Bertiniani from West Francia, the Annales Fuldenses from East Francia, and the Annales Xantenses from Middle Francia. He died in an unsuccessful attempt to impose a danegeld on the locals of the Ostergo.

In 864 Rodulf led a band of mercenaries (locarii) into Lotharingia to extract a payment from Lothair II, who exacted four denarii from every mansus (landholding) in the kingdom, as well as large number of cattle and much flour, wine, and beer. The only source to mention it is the contemporary Annales Bertiniani:

Hlotharius, Hlotharii filius, de omni regno suo quattuor denarios ex omni manso colligens, summam denariorum cum multa pensione farinae atque pecorum necnon vini ac sicerae Rodulfo Normanno, Herioldi filio, ac suis locarii nomine tribuit.

Lothar, son of Lothar, raised four denarii from every manse in his whole kingdom, and handed over the sum in cash, plus a large quantity of flour and livestock and also wine and cider, to the Norseman Hróðulfr [Rodulf], son of Haraldr [Harald], and his men, all this being termed a payment for service.

The word translated "cider" or "beer", sicera, is derived from ancient Hebrew and can refer to any alcoholic beverage that is not wine. It has been translated sherbet. The whole amount of the cash is not recorded. Whether it was paid as a stipend or as a tribute is debated: Einar Joranson could not tell, but Simon Coupland has argued that locarii (plural of locarium) refers consistently in Carolingian sources to payment for mercenary services, as opposed to tributum (defensive payment).

Twice in 872 Rodulf joined his uncle, Rorik, in paying a visit to Charles the Bald, as recorded in the Annales Bertiniani:

On 20 January he [Charles the Bald] left Compendio and went to the monastery of [name missing in surviving manuscripts] to hold talks with the Norsemen Hrørek [Rorik] and Hróðulfr [Rodulf]. . . In October he [Charles the Bald] came by boat down the Meuse to Maastricht and held talks with the Norsemen Hrørek and Hróðulfr who had come up the river to meet him. He gave a gracious reception to Hrørek who had proved loyal to him, but Hróðulfr he dismissed empty-handed, because he had been plotting acts of treachery and pitching his demands too high. Charles prepared his faithful men for defense against treacherous attacks of Hróðulfr. Then he rode back by way of Attigny to Saint Medard's Abbey, where he spent Christmas.

Added to his possible paid military service to Lothair II, his close relations with the Frankish kings suggests he may have had a fiefdom in Frisia, perhaps having succeeded his father there in the 840s. If so, then Charles became his overlord by the Treaty of Meerssen in 870. His major Viking activities took place, according to the annals, in West Francia and "across the water", presumably referring to the British Isles. According to the Annales Bertiniani, in the autumn of 873 Charles the Bald warned his leading vassals in the north of his kingdom to beware of Rodulf possible treachery. Janet Nelson, commenting on the Annales, speculated that Rodulf was conspiring with Charles rebellious younger son Carloman.

According to all three annals, Rodulf arrived in northern Frisia in June 873 and sent messengers to the Ostergo calling for tribute (tributa in the words of the Annales Fuldenses). The Frisians replied that they owed taxes only to their king, Louis the German, and his sons (Carloman, Louis, and Charles). A battle ensued, in which Rodulf was killed and his troops routed. The Annales Fuldenses record that a Scandinavian Christian, whom they do not name, fought on the Frisian side and provided counsel that was crucial to victory. These Annales also provide a full and detailed account of the battle. The account of the Annales Bertiniani is more brief:

Meanwhile the Norseman Hróðulfr (Latin: Rodulfus), who had inflicted many evils on Charles's realm, was slain in the realm of Louis with 500 and more of his accomplices. Charles got reliable news of this as he remained in his position in Angers.

The anonymous author of the Annales Xantenses remarks acidly on his death:

Quamvis baptizatus esset, caninam vitam digne morte finivit.

Even though he had been baptized, he ended his dog's life with a fitting death.
