= Harald Klak =

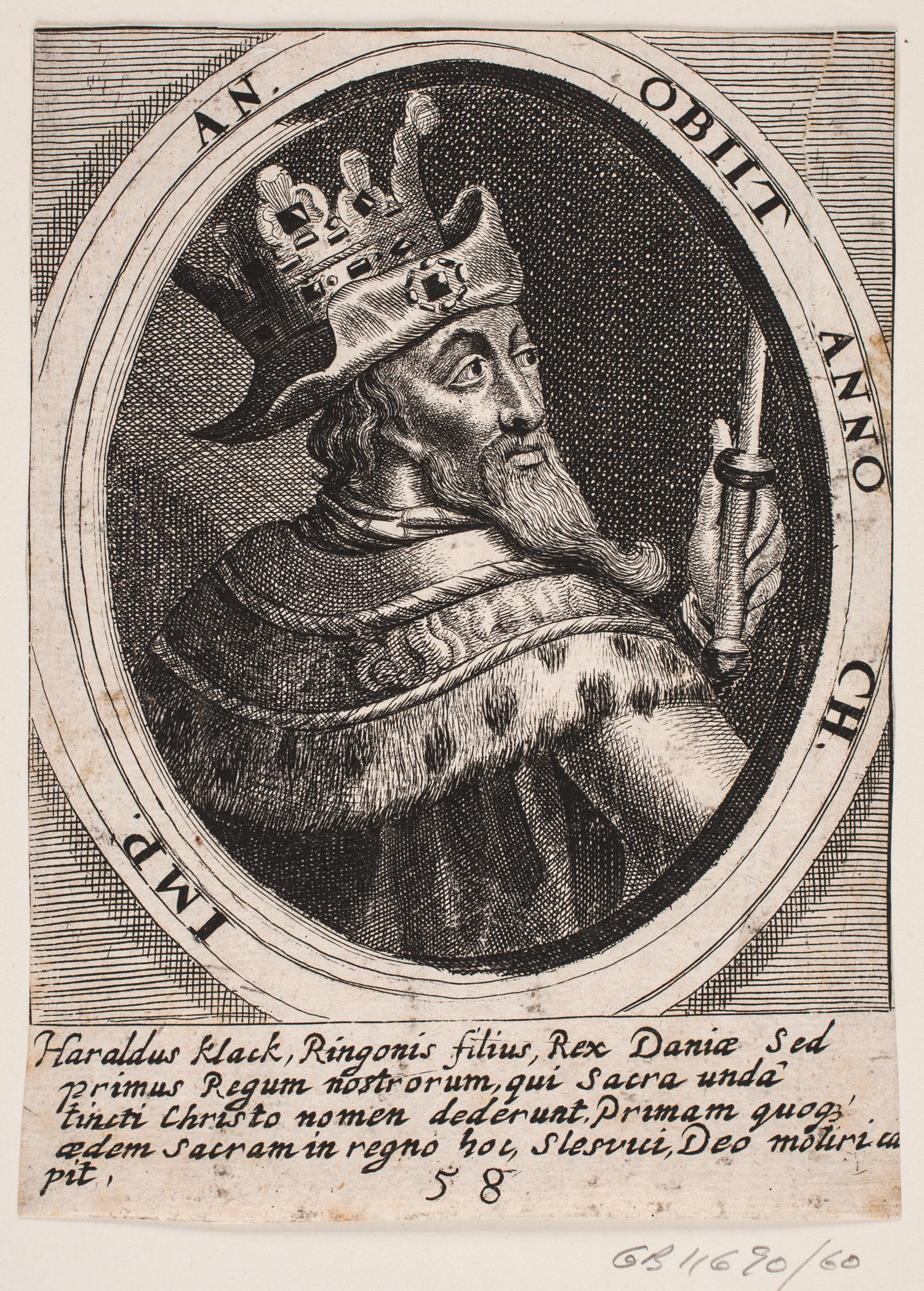
- Harald Klak as depicted on engraving from 1646 by Albert Haelwegh

King of the Danes
- Reign: 812–813, 819–827
- Predecessor: Sigfred and Anulo
- Successor: Horik I
- Born: Harald Halfdansson c. 785; Denmark
- Died: c. 852 (aged 67); Denmark
- Dynasty: House of Harald
- Religion: Norse religion; Christianity (from 826)

Harald 'Klak' Halfdansson (c. 785 – c. 852) was a king in Jutland (and possibly other parts of Denmark) around 812–814 and again from 819 to 827.

== Family ==
The identity of Harald's father is uncertain. He had at least three brothers: Anulo (died 812), Ragnfrid (died 814) and Hemming Halfdansson (died 837). An 837 entry in the Annales Fuldenses calls Hemming a son of Halfdan. This is the only mention of their father in a primary source. The identification relies on the 'widely made assumption' that the Hemming mentioned in 837 was the same Hemming mentioned in chronicle entries from two decades before. Stewart Baldwin, a modern genealogist, pointed out that they could also be two people with the same name, although Baldwin himself favors their identification.

The relation of this Halfdan with other Danish rulers is also uncertain. An 812 entry in the Royal Frankish Annals mentions "Anulo nepos Herioldi". The Latin "nepos" can be translated as both "grandson" or "nephew", making Anulo and his siblings grandsons or nephews of a senior Harald. This would make Halfdan a brother or son of this Harald. The Frankish Annals vaguely mention this elder Harald as king. A late and unreliable source of Frisian history mentions that their king Redbad II (the last king of the Frisians) in 754 had to flee to "the land of the Danes" where king Harald reigned ("Daniae Regi Heraldi"). Also, a King Sigifrid (Siegfried) is mentioned in 777, granting refuge to the Saxon duke Widukind. In 782, an emissary by the name of Halfdan was sent by Sigifrid to Charlemagne. The last mention of Sigifrid in the Annals is in 798, when Charlemagne sent an envoy to him. In 804, Gudfred is mentioned as King of the Danes, exchanging envoys with Charlemagne. Harald could be related to Sigifrid and Gudfred. His reign occurring between 798 and 804 are placed prior to that of Sigifrid. The time and extent of the rule of these earlier kings are uncertain, but the area they ruled presumably included the region closest to the Frankish realm, i.e. around Hedeby. Although they are historical figures insofar as that they are mentioned in historical sources, the details of their rule mostly belong to the realm of the legendary Danish kings.

The Europäische Stammtafeln: Stammtafeln zur Geschichte der Europäischen Staaten (1978) by Detlev Schwennicke assumes Sigifrid and the senior Harald to be brothers, both kings of Hedeby. The Europäische Stammtafeln further mentions several theories on their family line. The elder Harald is assumed to have succeeded his brother as King of Hedeby in 798. The book places his death in 804, "killed in battle in the Irish Sea". Their children supposedly included not only Halfdan, "third" King of Hedeby (father of Harald Klak and his siblings) but two other sons. The first identified as another Harald ("fourth" King of Hedeby) and the second as Holger.

Further Sigifrid and the senior Harald are given two further siblings in Europäische Stammtafeln. The third brother is identified as Halfdan the Mild, a ruler of the Yngling dynasty depicted in the Heimskringla. Their only sister is identified with Geva, wife of Windukind. The former in way of explanation of why Windukind sought refuge among the Danes. None of the theories regarding Harald's family and lineage in ES are well supported by sources.

According to the Annales Bertiniani, Harald was an uncle of Rorik of Dorestad. The Annales Xantenses mention Rorik being the brother of a "younger Harald". Several modern scholars have seen this as a contradiction and chosen to identify Rorik as an apparent fifth son of Halfdan. However, Simon Coupland in From poachers to gamekeepers: Scandinavian warlords and Carolingian kings and K. Cutler in Danish Exiles in the Carolingian Empire—the Case for Two Haralds have since argued that Rorik and the "younger Harald" were brothers, both nephews of Harald Klak. The theory has gained some acceptance since the 1990s as it would explain why Harald Klak gets a mostly positive assessment in the Frankish chronicles while Rorik's brother is depicted as a raider and enemy of the Franks. This would also mean Rudolf Haraldsson, a nephew of Rorik mentioned in the Annales Xantenses, was a son of the "younger Harald".

== The Civil War of 812–814 ==
There is first mention of Harald and his siblings in the Royal Frankish Annals. The entries in 811 end by mentioning the death of Charles the Younger (4 December 811) and Charlemagne wintering in Aachen. The entries in 812 begin with mention of the situation in Denmark: "Not much later the news arrived that Hemming, king of the Danes had died. Sigifrid, the nephew of King Godofrid, and Anulo, the nephew of Heriold and of the former king, both wished to succeed him. Being unable to agree on who should be king, they raised troops, fought a battle, and were both killed. The party of Anulo won, however, and made his brothers Heriold and Reginfrid their kings. The defeated party out of necessity had to go along with Anulo's party and did not reject the brothers as their kings. They say that ten thousand nine hundred and forty men died in that battle." Heriold usually translated to Harald. The name Anulo is thought to be related to Annulus (or anulus), being the Latin word for "ring". The name has been translated to "Ring". Since his fallen foe was named Sigefrid (Sigurd), there is a theory that the two rivals merged in later tradition to the figure of Sigurd Hring. The original Scandinavian form is theorised to have been "Ole", a common male name in Norway and Denmark. The vague Latin phrase "Herioldi, et ipsius regis" has been translated variously as "Harald, and the king himself" and "Harald, previous king". Conversely, this could mean Anulo was "nepos" of both the senior Harald and the other King mentioned in the same phrase, Hemming.

The story is repeated in an 812 entry of the Annales Fuldenses. This is not surprising as the entries of the Annales Fuldenses from 714 to the 830s were adopting material from earlier sources, including the Royal Frankish Annals. The Gesta Hammaburgensis ecclesiae pontificum by Adam of Bremen mentions "Sigafrid et Anulo, nepotes Godafridi", which would make both Anulo and Sigifrid "nepotes" (plural of nepos) of Gudfred. The Royal Frankish Annals then note "Heriold and Reginfrid, kings of the Danes, send an embassy to the emperor [Charlemagne], asking for peace and requesting that their brother Hemming be released." The text makes clear that Hemming was held prisoner by Charlemagne but leaves unclear when Hemming was captured and under what circumstances.

In 813, the Royal Annals mention a general assembly at Aachen. The occasion was Charlemagne crowning his son Louis the Pious as co-emperor of Francia and naming his grandson Bernard as ruler of the Kingdom of Italy. The text then turns its attention to the relations with the Danes. "From this assembly several Frankish and Saxon nobles were sent beyond the Elbe to the borders of the Norsemen. They came to make peace, at the request of the Danish Kings, whose brother they intended to return. When an equal number -they were sixteen- of Danish magnates met them at the stipulated place, peace was sworn by mutual oaths and the brother of the kings was returned. The Kings themselves at this time were not at home but had marched with an army toward Westarfolda, an area in the extreme northwest of their kingdom across the northern tip of Britain, whose princes and people refused to submit to them. When they returned after conquering the Britons and received their brother, who had been sent from the emperor, the sons of king Godofrid were assisted by not a few of the Danish nobles who for some time after leaving their homeland had been in exile with the Swedes. Since hosts of their countrymen joined the sons of Godofrid from all over the land of the Danes, they easily drove the kings from the kingdom after a battle".

The Chronicle of Moissac also reports: "Afterwards the sons of Godofrid came with their army and expelled Heriold and Reginfrid and also Hemming from their own kingdom; and they fled into secrecy. Thereupon the militia of the imperial lord Charlemagne received from them many presents, and he sent him [Hemming] back to his brothers with regards and support, in order that they should acquire their kingdom again.

The Royal Frankish Annals entries of 814 start with the death of Charlemagne. Louis the Pious became sole emperor and turned to diplomatic relations with other European powers. The Royal Annals then mention the continuation of the conflict among the Danes and that Harald Klak sought refuge in the court of Louis. "Heriold and Reginfrid, kings of the Danes, had been defeated and expelled from their kingdom the year before [813] by the sons of Godofrid, against whom they regrouped their forces and again made war. In this conflict Reginfid and the oldest son of Godofrid were killed. When this had come to pass, Heriold despaired of his cause, came to the emperor [Louis], and put himself under his protection. The emperor received him and told him to go to Saxony and to wait for the proper time when he would be able to give him the help which Heriold had requested."

== Harald's alliance with Louis the Pious ==
Simon Coupland, a modern historian, has noted that Harald was a pagan exile, seeking refuge and military assistance in the court of a Christian ruler. Coupland notes that Louis granting refuge and preparing said military assistance did not mean this was an "innovative step". Charlemagne, Louis' father, had signed such unorthodox alliances before. The historian lists a number of examples. Charlemagne had supported Abdellah, an exiled Mauritanian ruler in 797. Theodor, ruler of the Huns, fled an invasion by Slavic peoples and was granted refuge by Charlemagne in 805. Eardwulf of Northumbria when deposed c. 808, was also granted refuge and promised help in recovering his throne.

The 815 entries of the Royal Annals focus on the campaign for restoring Harald to his throne. "The emperor [Louis] commanded that Saxons and Obodrites should prepare for this campaign, and twice in that winter the attempt was made to cross the Elbe. But since the weather suddenly turned and made the ice on the river melt, the campaign was held up. Finally, when the winter was over, about the middle of May, the proper time to begin the march arrived. Then all Saxon counts and all troops of the Obodrites, under orders to bring help to Heriold, marched with the imperial emissary Baldrich across the River Eider into the land of the Norsemen called Silendi. From Silendi they went on and, finally, on the seventh day, pitched camp on the coast at [name missing in surviving manuscripts]. There they halted for three days. But the sons of Godofrid, who had raised against them a large army and a fleet of two hundred ships, remained on an island three miles of the shore and did not dare engage them. Therefore, after everywhere laying waste the neighboring districts and receiving hostages from the people, they returned to the emperor in Saxony, who at that time was holding the general assembly of his people at Paderborn."

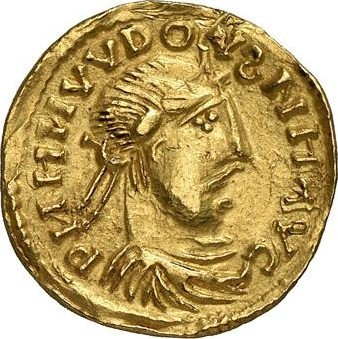
Solidus of Louis the Pious, ca. 9th century

While the campaign resulted in the looting of some areas held by the Danes, the main objective was not achieved. Harald was among the returning troops, the Danish throne eluding him. The Royal Annals report the conclusion of the assembly. "He [Louis] settled the affairs of the Slavs and of Heriold, and, leaving Heriold behind in Saxony, returned to his palace in Frankfurt." Harald apparently continued operations against his rivals. An 817 entry of the Royal Annals reports "Because of the persistent aggression of Heriold, the sons of Godofrid, king of the Danes, also sent an embassy to the emperor [Louis], asked for peace, and promised to preserve it. This sounded more like hypocrisy than truth, so it was dismissed as empty talk and aid was given to Heriold against them."

A next attempt in 819, again with help from the Obotrites, met with more success and some kind of settlement seems to have been reached with the sons of Gudfred, since Harald was joint king with two of them in 821. One of them probably was Horik the Elder. The Royal Annals report "On the emperor's [Louis] order Heriold was taken to his ships by the Obodrites and sailed back to his homeland to take over the kingdom. Two of the sons of Godofrid are said to have made an alliance with him to share the throne; two others were driven out of the country. But this is believed to have been done by trickery." An 821 entry mentions "Everything was quiet on the Danish front in this year, and Heriold was received as partner in the rule by the sons of Godofrid. This is believed to have caused the peaceful relations among them at this time." In 822, the general assembly was held in Frankfurt. The relevant entry mentions "Embassies from Nordmannia were also at this assembly, from Heriold as well as from the sons of Godofrid".

In 823, tensions had appeared in Harald's relations with his co-rulers. Louis was asked to mediate. The Royal Annals report "Also Heriold came from Nordmannia, asking for help against the sons of Godofrid, who threatened to drive him out of his country. To explore this matter more thoroughly Counts Theothari and Hruodmund were sent to the sons of Godofrid. Traveling ahead of Heriold they carefully studied the dispute with the sons of Godofrid as well as the condition of the whole kingdom of the Norsemen and informed the emperor of all they could find out in these lands. They returned with archbishop Ebo of Rheims, who had gone to preach in the land of the Danes on the counsel of the emperor and with the approval of the Roman pontiff and had baptized many converts to the faith during the previous summer." Coupland notes that the entry reveals two things. First that "the political situation in Denmark remained extremely tense" and second that Louis continued to interfere in Danish affairs. The motivation behind his interest in the country is not stated in primary sources. The book "An Introduction to the Viking History of Western Europe, Viking Antiquities in Great Britain and Ireland" (1940) by Haakon Shetelig, presented the theory that Louis was laying the groundwork for a "military invasion and occupation of Denmark". While the theory has its merits, Coupland notes that it ignores its context. The "neighbouring Slav lands" of Francia were in the process of becoming dependent territories, their rulers subordinating themselves to Louis. The emperor may have envisioned Denmark as another protectorate of Francia.

An 826 entry, reads "At the same time Heriold came with his wife and a great number of Danes and was baptized with his companions at St. Alban's basilica in Mainz. The emperor presented him with many gifts before he returned home through Frisia, the route by which he had come. In this province one county was given to him, the county of Riustringen, so that he would be able to find refuge there with his possessions if he were ever in danger." The Vita Hludovici mentions "Heriold (Latin:Herioldus) with his wife and many Danes appeared from the regions of the Norsemen, he was baptized at Saint-Albans in Mainz with all his companions and he was flooded by the emperor with many gifts. For the pious emperor was afraid that he would be refused to live in his homeland, he gave him a county in Frisia, called Rüstringen, where he and his company could recover if necessary." The Annales Xantenses also note "The emperor Louis held an episcopal synod at Ingelheim, and here a great number of Norsemen came to him, and a leader of them named Haraldr (Latin: Heriodus) and his wife were baptized, and with them more than 400 people of both sexes."

According to the Vita Ansgari by Rimbert, "After this it happened that a king named Heriold (Latin:Herioldus), who ruled over some of the Danes, was assailed by hatred and malignity, and was driven from his kingdom by the other kings of the same province. He came to his serene majesty the emperor Ludovic and asked that he might be thought worthy to receive his help so that he might be able to regain his kingdom. While the emperor kept him at his court he urged him, by personal persuasion and through the instrumentality of others, to accept the Christian faith, because there would then be a more intimate friendship between them, and a Christian people would more readily come to his aid and to the aid of his friends if both peoples were worshippers of the same God. At length, by the assistance of divine grace, he brought about his conversion, and when he had been sprinkled with the holy water of baptism he himself received him from the sacred font and adopted him as his son. When, then, he desired to send him back to his own land in order that he might, by his assistance, seek to recover his dominions, he began to make diligent enquiry in order that he might find a holy and devoted man who could go and continue with him, and who might strengthen him and his people, and by teaching the doctrine of salvation might induce them to receive the faith of the Lord."

During the reign of Louis the Pious, the Frankish Empire had no effective fleet, and this made the coast of Frisia a weak point in the defense of his realm. The motivation for granting Harald a fief in Frisia possibly had to do with Harald committing himself to defending the Frisian coastline against future Viking raids. The center of his fief was located in northwestern Germany, west of Oldenburg. This may have been the first piece of Frankish territory given to a Dane.

Adam of Bremen placed the baptism following another deposition of Harald. "The king of the Danes, Haraldr (Latin:Haraldus), despoiled of his kingdom by the sons of Godofrid, came to Louis a suppliant. And on being instructed thereupon in the doctrine of the Christian faith, he was baptized at Mainz with his wife and brother and a great multitude of Danes. The emperor lifted him from the sacred font and, resolved to restore him to the kingdom, gave him a fief across the Elbe, and, to withstand the pirates, granted his brother Harekr [Latin:Horuch) a part of Frisia. (This territory the Danes still claim as if it were legitimately their own.)" This Harekr is not mentioned elsewhere.

== Return to Denmark and later life ==
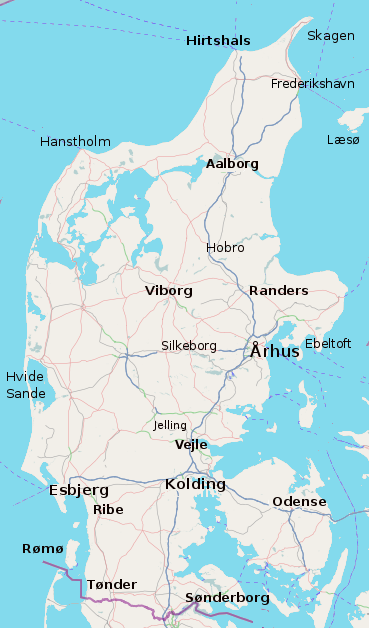
Map of Jutland

On his return to Denmark Harald was probably accompanied by Saint Anskar and a group of monks and it may have been in this time that a church in Hedeby was first built, as well as a school in which twelve Danish boys (some of whom were from Harald's household) were to be educated as priests. The Vita Ansgari reports: "The two monks [volunteering to travel with Harald] were subsequently brought before the king, who was gratified by their willingness and desire to undertake this task, and who gave them whatever was necessary for the performance of their ministerial functions, also writing cases, tents and other things that would be helpful and which seemed likely to be needed on their great journey. He bade them to go with Harald and commanded them to devote the utmost care to his profession of faith and by their godly exhortations to confirm in the faith both Harald and his companions who had been baptized together with him, for fear lest at the instigation of the devil they should return to their former errors, and at the same time by their preaching to urge others to accept the Christian religion. Having been then dismissed by the emperor they had none to render them any menial service, as no one in the abbot's household would go with them of his own accord, and he would compel no one to go against his will."

"Harald, to whom they had been committed, was as yet ignorant and untaught in the faith, and was unaware how God's servants ought to behave. Moreover, his companions who had been but recently converted and had been trained in a very different faith, paid them little attention. Having started then with considerable difficulty they arrived at Cologne. At that time there was a venerable bishop there named Hadebald. He had compassion upon their needs and presented them with a good boat in which they might place their possessions and in which there were two cabins which had been suitably prepared for them. When Harald saw the boat he decided to remain with them in it, so that he and they could each have a cabin. This tended to promote an increase of friendship and goodwill between them; his companions also, from this time forward, paid careful attention to their wants. On leaving the boat they passed through Dorestad and crossing the neighbouring territory of the Frisians came to the Danish borders. As King Harald could not for the time being obtain peaceful possession of his kingdom, the emperor gave him a place beyond the River Elbe [Rüstringen] so that if it were necessary he might halt there."

In the second year after his return to Denmark, however, in 827, he was once again expelled by the surviving sons of Gudfred. One of them was Horik I. The Royal Annals mention in 827: "The emperor [Louis] held two assemblies. One was at Nijmegen because Hohrek (Latin: Hohrici), son of Godofrid, the king of the Danes, had falsely promised to appear before the emperor." Later in the year the Annals mention the deposition of Harald. "In the meantime the kings of the Danes, that is, the sons of Godofrid, deprived Heriold of his share of the kingship and forced him to leave Nordmannia." The reason for the deposition is not mentioned. His introduction of Christianity may have also made him unpopular with his subjects. Harald probably retreated to his lands in Rüstringen.

The war continued the following year. The Royal Annals mention: "Near the border of Nordmannia in the meantime negotiations were planned to ratify the peace between Norsemen and Franks and to discuss the affair of Heriold. For this business counts and margraves came from almost all of Saxony. But Heriold was too thirsty for action. He broke the peace that had agreed upon and confirmed by hostages, and burned and pillaged some small villages of the Norsemen. Upon hearing this the sons of Godefrid immediately gathered troops. Our people were stationed on the bank of the River Eider, not expecting any trouble. The sons of Godefrid advanced towards the march, crossed the river and attacked the Franks, driving them out of their castle and putting them to flight. They took everything from them and retreated with all their forces to their camp. Then they deliberated how to ward off revenge for this action. They dispatched an embassy to the emperor and explained that need had compelled their will to do this, that they were ready to give satisfaction, and that it was entirely up to the emperor how amends should be made in order to preserve peace between the two parties."

The Vita Hludovici also blames the impatience of Harald in breaking the negotiations. "In the meanwhile the sons of the former king of the Danes Godefrid had expelled Heriold from his kingdom. The emperor wanted to help Heriold, but he also had entered a peace treaty with the sons of Godefrid, so he dispatched Saxon counts together with Heriold himself and instructed them to negotiate with the envoys that they should let him participate in their alliance, like before. But Heriold was impatient about this delay, he burned down some villages without our knowledge and carried off booty. The Danes immediately raided our people by surprise, as they believed it were our deeds, they crossed the River Eider and drove the supposed perpetrators away from the stronghold, took everything with them and withdrew to their own camp. As they recognized the real situation and feared an appropriate revenge, they first dismissed messengers to those they inflicted such a defeat, then to the emperor, they declared their deception and offered for conciliation a suitable satisfaction. They left the manner of this satisfaction to the desire of the emperor as long as peace was maintained, which the emperor granted them according to their wish and petition."

The war on the border continued into at least 829. Later that year a rumor was current that the Danes were preparing to invade and Louis gathered an army to meet this threat, but the rumor turned out to be false. It may well have been Harald who spread this rumor. However Harald disappears from the Frankish sources by the late 820. He had certainly failed to regain his throne but probably kept on living among the Franks.

== Death ==
His brother Hemming seems to have died in 837 defending Walcheren from unidentified Viking raiders. The Annales Fuldenses report "The Norsemen came to the island of Walcheren to collect tribute and on 17 June they killed Eggihard, the count of this place, and Hemingr, the son of Halfdan, with many others, and laid waste Dorestad and went back after they received tribute from the Frisians. The emperor[Louis] gave up his journey to Rome and stayed the winter at Aachen. The Annales Bertiniani mention the attack but not Hemming. "The Norsemen at this time fell on Frisia with their usual surprise attack. Coming upon our unprepared people on an island called Walcheren, they slaughtered many of them and plundered even more. They stayed on the island for a while, levying as much tribute as they wanted. Then they fell on Dorestad with the same fury and exacted tribute in the same way. When the Emperor heard about these attacks, he postponed his planned journey to Rome and wasted no time in hurrying to the fort of Nijmegen close by Dorestad. When the Norsemen heard of his arrival there, they withdrew immediately. Now the Emperor summoned a general assembly and held an inquiry in public with those magnates to whom he had delegated the task of guarding that coast. It became clear from the discussion that partly through the sheer impossibility of the task, partly through the disobedience of certain men, it had not been possible for them to offer any resistance to the attackers. Energetic abbots and counts were therefore dispatched to suppress the insubordinate Frisians. Now too, that from then on he would be better able to resist their incursions, he gave orders that a fleet should be made ready to go more speedily in pursuit in whatever direction might be required."

The Annales Fuldenses mention in 852: "Haraldr the Norseman had in earlier years fled the anger of his lord Horekr [Horik I], king of the Danes, and went to King Louis, by whom he was well received. He was baptized and received into the Christian faith, and held in honour among the Franks for many years. At length he became suspect to the leading men of the northern regions and the warders of the Danish march as of doubtful loyalty and a possible treachery, and was therefore killed by them." Harald the younger, his supposed nephew, was already mentioned deceased in 850. Unless this is a second entry for the same event, the dead man was probably Harald Klak. Though it could be argued that it was Harald the nephew or another namesake who died, the royal reception by Louis seems to only match Harald Klak. Coupland notes that this Harald was killed "on nothing more substantial than the suspicion of potential disloyalty". It seems that, in the years between 829 and 852, Harald had remained a figure of some influence in the region, but he never again managed to launch a serious attempt to regain the Danish throne, nor did the Frankish monarchs seem interested in sending more armies to fight his cause. He died two years before his rival King Horik the elder.

== Heirs ==
The Annales Bertiniani mention a Godfrid Haraldsson who was baptized at Mainz. He has been identified as a son of Harald Klak. King Sigifrid of Denmark, reigning later in the 9th century, and his brother Halfdan are considered "nepotes" of either Rorik of Dorestad or Horik II, based on various interpretations of the Annales Vedastini. If the former they could be indirect successors to the claims of Harald on the throne of Denmark. An 891 entry of the Annales Fuldenses mentions Sigifrid killed along with his co-ruler Godafrid. Their deaths are also mentioned in the "Gesta quorundam regum Francorum". The name of the co-ruler suggests he was also a member of the family line.

The next mentioned ruler of Denmark is a Svend (Sweyn) who was king following the conquests of Olof the Brash. He is mentioned by Adam of Bremen as father of Harthacnut of Denmark. Between the reigns of Svend and Harthacnut, Adam places a brief one by Sigerich. They could be descendants of the same family line but the relations are unclear.

According to Geschiedenis van Nederland (1995) by Gerlof Verwey, Harald Klak had another nephew, Hemming, Count in Frisia. Verwey argues Hemming was a brother of Rorik of Dorestad and Harald the younger.

According to "Ragnarssona þáttr", Klakk-Harald was the father of Thyra and father-in-law of Gorm the Old. "Gorm took the kingship after his father. He married Thyri, who was called Denmark's Saviour, daughter of Klakk-Harald, who was king in Jutland. But when Harald died, Gorm took all of Harald's realm under his rule too. King Gorm went with his host over the whole of Jutland and abolished all the petty kings as far south as the River Schlei, and thus seized much of Wendland, and he fought great battles against the Saxons and became a mighty king. He had two sons. The eldest was called Knut, and the younger one Harald. Knut was the most handsome man ever seen. The king loved him above any other man, and so did all the people. He was called The Love of the Danes. Harald resembled his mother's kin and his mother loved him no less than Knut." However the Gesta Danorum by Saxo Grammaticus offers a contradictory parentage for Thyra. "This man [Gorm] was counselled by the elders to celebrate the rites of marriage, and he wooed Thyra, the daughter of Ethelred, the king of the English, for his wife. She surpassed other women in seriousness and shrewdness, and laid the condition on her suitor that she would not marry him till she had received Denmark as a dowry. This compact was made between them, and she was betrothed to Gorm." This Ethelred was probably Ethelred of Wessex according to the context.

The "Ragnarssona þáttr" also names Harald Klak as father of Ingeborg and father-in-law of Sigurd Hart. "When Sigurd was twelve, he killed the berserk Hildibrand in a duel, and he single-handedly slew twelve men in that fight. After that Klakk-Harald gave him his daughter, who was called Ingibjorg. They had two children: Gudthorm and Ragnhild." The narrative then identifies Ragnhild as the wife of Halfdan the Black and mother of Harald Fairhair of Norway. The Heimskringla changes the name of Harald Klak's daughter but the given lineage remains the same. "Ragnhild's mother was Thorny, a daughter of Klakharald king in Jutland, and a sister of Thrye Dannebod who was married to the Danish king, Gorm the Old, who then ruled over the Danish dominions."

== Notes ==
Regnal titles
Preceded by Sigfred and Anulo	King of Denmark co-ruled with Reginfrid; 812–813	Succeeded by Horik I
