= Abdagus =

Duke of Frisia

Abdagus (fl. 873) was, according to 18th and 19th century historical books, a duke of Frisia.

Abdagus, Duke of Frisia, appointed by Louis the German, headed in 873 the Frisians against the Danes, who had invaded Frisia under the Danish leader Rudolf, and destroyed and plundered large parts of the country. The battle was fierce, but Rudolf fell early with 500 compatriots (or 800, the sources disagree on this). The remainder fled to a stronghold, where they were besieged by the Frisians. One Norman, who had converted to Christianity and lived amongst the Frisians, and who has been said to have been Roruk, Rudolf's uncle, convinced them to end the siege and sign a pact. The Danes promised to return their plunder and never to return to the territory of King Louis. Thereafter, the sieged were allowed to return to their ships, keeping a few as hostages to maintain the pact.
