= Hemming (count in Frisia) =

Danish royalty

A Dane named Hemming was a count in the area of Rüstringen in East Frisia in the 9th century. He and some others of his family were installed in this region by Emperor Lothair I.

== History ==
Hemming was the son of one of the brothers of Harald Klak (died ca. 852), possibly Anulo (died 812). Rorik of Dorestad was thus probably his brother as was Harald the Younger (died ca. 842), Godfrid Haraldsson was his cousin. The Dane Hemming, son of Halfdan, who was killed at Walcheren in 837 was his uncle. Lothair I named him as a joint count along with his brother Harald in 841. His county was a part of Frisia in those times, and is now a part of Lower Saxony in Germany, although a large part of it has been submerged by the advancing sea. The part of the Frankish Realm that included Frisia was subject to trouble from plundering Vikings and by appointing some of their leaders as counts, the king was hoping they would defend their territories against other invading Vikings.
