= Harald the Younger =

Danish Viking leader

Harald the Younger (from "Herioldus iunior", how he is named in the Annales Xantenses) was a Viking leader and a member of the Danish royal family. He has sometimes been mistakenly identified with Harald Klak, who was in fact his uncle and probable namesake. His brother was Rorik of Dorestad.

In 841 the Emperor Lothair I granted the isle of Walcheren to Harald and his brother as a fief (beneficium) rewarding him for the attacks he had launched against Lothair's father, Louis the Pious, during the civil wars of the 830s. Since at the time Harald was a pagan, whereas the population of Walcheren was Christian, this incident is probably the basis for the contemporary historian Nithard's claim that Lothair placed a Christian population in submission to a group of Northmen and gave them licence to plunder the Christian territories of his enemies in the same year. Between 840 and 843 Lothair was engaged in a civil war with his brothers Louis the German and Charles the Bald, and Nithard records that Harald was present in his army in 842. Not long thereafter Harald died and his brother was forced to flee to the court of Louis the German, where he spent several years.

Although later sources unambiguously describe Harald as a pagan—Prudentius of Troyes, author of the Annales Bertiniani, regarded him as a "persecutor of the Christian faith and a demon-worshipper" and his receipt of a benefice as an "utterly detestable crime"—he may have been baptised as a young man at the imperial court. Harald Klak and his family, perhaps including Harald, were baptised at Mainz in 826, with Lothair standing as godfather. Harald's son Godfrid Haraldsson and one of his nephews remained at the imperial court even after the elder Harald left. Since Godfrid remained allied with Lothair until the mid-840s, it is possible that Harald was his cousin who remained with Lothair after 826 and began raiding Louis the Pious's Frisian lands in 834.
