= Paphlagonian expedition of the Rus' =

830s Rus'-Byzantine conflict

- Part of Rus'–Byzantine Wars
Date	830-831
Location	Paphlagonian, Byzantine Empire
Result	Rus' victory

Belligerents
Rus'	Byzantine Empire

Commanders and leaders
Unknown	George of Amastris

The Paphlagonian expedition of the Rus' was an attack by the Rus' on cities on the Propontis (Sea of Marmara) and on the coast of the Paphlagonia, marking the first known contact between the Rus' and the Byzantine Empire. Its date is questioned, as is the belief that it was distinct from the Rus'–Byzantine War (860).

== Paphlagonian expedition ==
The expedition is documented in the Life of Saint George of Amastris, a hagiographic work describing the Rus' as "the people known to everyone for their barbarity, ferocity, and cruelty". According to the text, they attacked Propontis (probably aiming for Constantinople) before turning east and raiding Paphlagonia some time after the death of St. George (ca. 806). When they fell upon the city of Amastris, the intercession of St. George helped the inhabitants to survive the raid. This is held by many to be the earliest written record of the migration of the Rus' into southeastern Europe. It is only according to late and dubious accounts that the Rus' would have reached Byzantine borders before the Paphlagonian expedition. Notably, the 15th century Slavonic Life of St. Stephen of Sugdaea records the invasion led by a certain Bravlin of the Rus', who supposedly devastated Crimea in the 790s, but this does not feature in the ancient Greek recension of the work.

== Date of the expedition ==
Dating the Life is of paramount importance for dating the Paphlagonian expedition. Unfortunately the source or parts of it have been variously ascribed to the 9th or 10th centuries, and the question still seems to be far from being settled. Vasily Vasilievsky, who was the first to publish the text in 1893, attributed it to Ignatios the Deacon (ca. 775 – ca. 848). Accordingly, he thought that the attack had happened during the period of Iconoclasm (before 842), notably dating it to the years 825–830. Alexander Vasiliev pointed out that Emperor Theophilus provided for the safe conduct of the Rus', who had somehow arrived at Constantinople (ca. 838), through Frankish lands by his embassy to Louis the Pious of 839, as witnessed to by the Annals of St. Bertin, which is inconsistent with the assumption that the raid had at that time already taken place. Thus, rejecting Vasilievsky's arguments as to authorship and date of the work, he identified the Paphlagonian expedition described in the Life with the raid in 860 that reached Constantinople. Constantine Zuckerman, however, maintains a higher dating of the sack of Amastris to the 830s and holds the 838 embassy of the Rus' to Constantinople, as recorded in the same entry of the Annals of St. Bertin, to be an attempt at negotiating a peace treaty with Byzantium. Other scholars believe the raid took place as early as 818 or 819. Others, while maintaining the attribution of the Life to Ignatios, have made an interesting but so far unproven case that the description of the invasion alone was inserted into the Life in the second half of the 9th century or later and thus reflects Rus'-Byzantine relations as they stood by that time, after the 860 raid. Others still, including the same Vasiliev in his later production, argued for an even later composition of the Life and accordingly held the account of the Paphlagonian raid to echo the 941 attack. This is little more than an unverifiable guess, however, and a rather facile one, given that the work is transmitted by a single 10th-century manuscript.

== See also ==
- Caspian expeditions of the Rus'
- List of wars involving Russia
