= Harald Halfdansson =

Harald Halfdansson may refer to:

- Harald Klak (c. 785 – c. 852), King of Denmark
- Harald Fairhair (c. 850 – c. 932), first King of Norway
