= Siege of Asselt =

882 siege

Date	882 AD
Location	Ascloha (Asselt) in Meuse valley, near Roermond, Netherlands 51.194166°N 5.9875°E
Result	Frankish victory: Godfrid became a vassal of Charles the Fat and converted to Christianity.

Belligerents
East Francia	Kingdom of Denmark

Commanders and leaders
Charles the Fat	Godfrid

Strength
Unknown	Unknown

Casualties and losses
Unknown	Unknown

The siege of Asselt was a Frankish siege of the Viking camp at Ascloha (Asselt) in the Meuse valley in the year 882. Though the Vikings were not forced by arms to abandon their camp, they were compelled to come to terms whereby their leader, Godfrid, was converted to Christianity.

== History ==
The precise location of Asselt is somewhat disputed. The charters call it Ascloha and the Bavarian continuation of the Annales Fuldenses assigns the locale on the Meuse river, fourteen miles from the Rhine. In the past, it was most often identified with Elsloo, north of Maastricht. These days, most scholars prefer Asselt, near Roermond, which better fits the distance to the Rhine.

Immediately after assuming the kingship of East Francia in Regensburg in early May, Charles the Fat, already emperor, held an assembly (late that same month) at Worms to determine a course of action against the Vikings who were encamped at Asselt. An army comprising Franks, Alemanni, Baiuvarii, Thuringi, Saxons, and Lombards was assembled to march north and drive off the Vikings. The Lombards, Alemans, and Franks approached up the Rhine on the west while the Bavarians went along the eastern bank and crossed over at Andernach. The emperor, taking the line of verse "What do I care whether I win by force or tricks?" as his strategy, sent a force of Bavarians under Arnulf of Carinthia and Franks under Henry of Franconia ahead to ambush the unsuspecting Northmen.

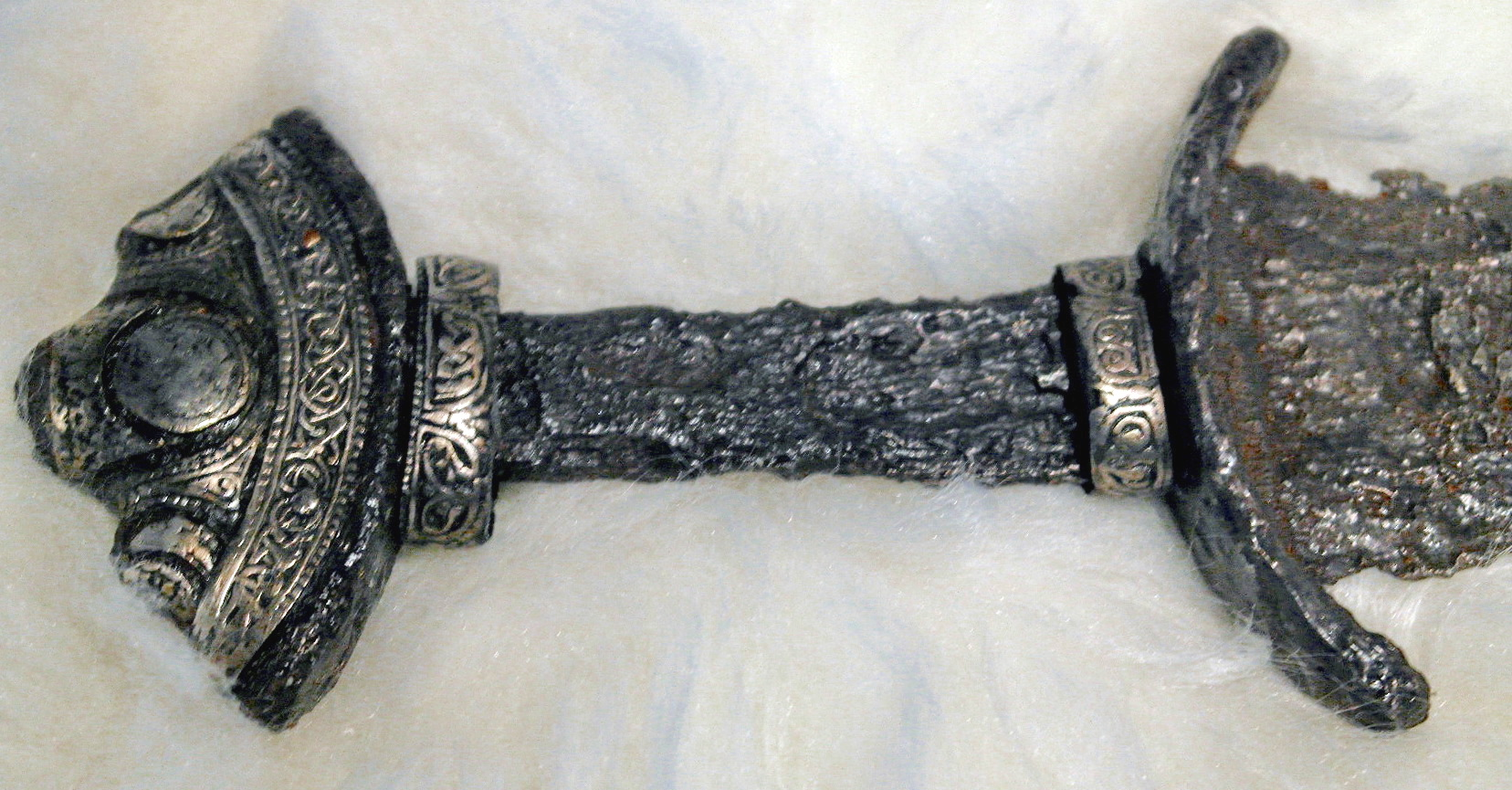
Part of a Viking sword, found in Wessem, near Asselt

According to the biased account of the Mainz continuation of the Annales Fuldenses, the camp was about to fall when Liutward of Vercelli, bribed by the Vikings, convinced the emperor to meet envoys from Godfrid and make peace, even exchanging hostages. Godfrid was granted the Kennemerland, which had formerly been ruled by Roric, as a vassal. Charles also agreed to pay a Danegeld to the Viking leader Sigifrid, partly using monies from churches. The Mainz continuator portrayed the army as greatly displeased with their emperor. The Bavarian continuator merely mentions that the initial ambush was thwarted by traitors and the subsequent siege — which lasted twelve days — by the spread of disease from rotting corpses and a very severe hailstorm. Godfrid, according to this account, swore oaths to Charles promising never to again lay waste his kingdom and accepted Christianity and baptism, at which Charles stood as his godfather. The Mainz continuation had a particularly poor opinion of Charles the Fat because its patron, Liutbert, had been dismissed from his court position with Charles' succession.

The campaign over, Charles returned to Koblenz and there dispersed the army. His reputation as a weak and inept ruler stems largely from this campaign, though contemporaries did not in general see it as a failure. Only the Mainz cleric of Liutbert's, adding to the annals of Fulda had that impression.

== Sources ==
- MacLean, Simon. Kingship and Politics in the Late Ninth Century: Charles the Fat and the end of the Carolingian Empire. Cambridge University Press: 2003.
- Reuter, Timothy. Germany in the Early Middle Ages, c. 800-1056. Longman, 1991.
- The Annals of Fulda. (Manchester Medieval series, Ninth-Century Histories, Volume II.) Reuter, Timothy (trans.) Manchester: Manchester University Press, 1992.
