= Annales Vedastini =

The Annales Vedastini or Annals of Saint Vaast are historical annals written in Latin at the beginning of the 10th century, in the Abbey of Saint Vaast in Arras (modern France). They are an important source for history of the Carolingian Empire in the second half of the 9th century. The years from 874 to 900 are recorded with a strong bias for West Frankish and Lotharingian affairs.

The Annals of St-Vaast (AV, as often abbreviated) were later combined with some other Reichsannalen (such as the Annales Bertiniani) in the so-called Chronicon Vedastinum, a general chronicle covering the history of the Carolingian Empire.

== See also ==
- Reichsannalen
- Carolingian Renaissance

== Sources ==
- McKitterick, Rosamond (2000). "The Illusion of Royal Power in the Carolingian Annals". English Historical Review. 115 (460): 1–20.
- Pertz, Georgius Heinricus, ed. (1826). "Annales Vedastini". Monumenta Germaniae Historica: Scriptores. Vol. 1. Hannoverae: Impensis Bibliopolii Aulici Hahniani. pp. 516–531.
- Pertz, Georg Heinrich, ed. (1829). "Annales Vedastini". Monumenta Germaniae Historica: Scriptores. Vol. 2. Hannoverae: Impensis Bibliopolii Aulici Hahniani. pp. 196–209.
- Rau, Reinhold, ed. (1958). Quellen zur Karolingischen Reichsgeschichte, II: Jahrbücher von St. Bertin: Jahrbücher von St. Vaast: Xantener Jahrbücher. Darmstadt: Wissenschaftliche Buchgesellschaft.
