= George of Amastris =

Byzantine monk (died 802/807)

Saint George of Amastris
- Born: Byzantine Empire
- Died: 802/807 AD; Byzantine Empire
- Honored in: Eastern Orthodox Church
- Feast: 21 February

George of Amastris (Greek: Γεώργιος ὁ Ἀμάστριδος; died 802/807) was a Byzantine monk who was made bishop of Amastris against his will.

== Life ==
George was born in the town ton Kromnenon, located near Amastris in Paphlagonia, to a local noble family, around the middle of the 8th century.

As a young man, he began a career in the church administration, but left it to become a hermit on Mt. Agrioserike. Still later, he joined a cenobitic monastic community at a place called Bonyssa. When the see of Amastris fell vacant in c. 790, the Patriarch of Constantinople Tarasios appointed George to fill it, despite the emperor favouring a different person for the post.

George was consecrated as bishop in Constantinople. During his time as bishop of Amastris, George presided over the return of the remains of John of Gothia to the latter's native city of Parthenia, Crimea. George died early in the reign of Emperor Nikephoros I, of whom George was a notable supporter.

He is recognized as a saint in the Orthodox liturgy, and his feast-day is 21 February.

== Hagiography ==
George is the subject of a hagiography preserved in a single manuscript dating to the 10th century. In it, the saint is credited with several miracles, including saving the city from a raid by the hitherto-unknown Rus', who intended to despoil the saint's tomb.

The accuracy of this information is open to question, and depends on the dating of its composition: Vasily Vasilievsky and Ihor Ševčenko have attributed it to George's near-contemporary Ignatios the Deacon, with a date of composition sometime before 842, whereas Germaine da Costa-Louillet and Wanda Wolska-Conus considered it a later, 10th-century work. Athanasios Markopoulos further suggested that while the bulk of the work is to be attributed to Ignatios, the Russian episode was a later addition, under the influence of Patriarch Photios. The significance of the episode's authenticity lies in its being possibly the first recorded attack by the Rus' against Byzantium.

Despite his close ties to Empress Irene of Athens and Nikephoros I, the hagiography is noteworthy for its "lack of anti-Iconoclastic invective". As a result, and because of some similarities in the treatment of Emperor Nikephoros I to Nikephoros II Phokas (r. 963–969) Alexander Kazhdan suggested a date of composition towards the end of the 10th century.

=== Editions ===
- V. Vasilievsky (ed.) Russko-vizantijskie issledovanija 2 (St. Petersburg: 1893), 1-73.
- Greek text available at the Dumbarton Oaks Hagiography Database.
- English translation by Jenkins, et al. from the University of Notre Dame.

== Sources ==
- Kazhdan, Alexander, ed. (1991). The Oxford Dictionary of Byzantium. Oxford and New York: Oxford University Press. ISBN 0-19-504652-8.
- Kazhdan, Alexander; Talbot, Alice-Mary; Alexakis, Alexander; Efthymiadis, Stephanos; McGrath, Stamatina; Sherry, Lee Francis; Zielke, Beate, eds. (1998). Dumbarton Oaks Hagiography Database of the Eighth, Ninth and Tenth Century (PDF). Washington, DC: Dumbarton Oaks.
