= Godfrid, Duke of Frisia =

Danish Viking leader

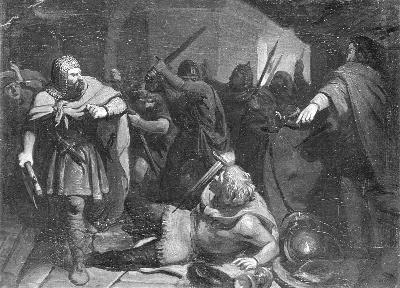
Murder of Godfrid, duke of Frisia by Jacobus van Dijck

Godfrid, Godafrid, Gudfrid, or Gottfrid (Old Norse: Guðfrið; murdered June 885) was a Danish Viking leader of the late ninth century. He had probably been with the Great Heathen Army, descended on the continent, and became a vassal of the emperor Charles the Fat, controlling most of Frisia between 882 and 885.

In 880, Godfrid ravaged Flanders using Ghent as his base. In 882, Godfrid ravaged Lotharingia and the cities of Maastricht, Liège, Stavelot, Prüm, Cologne, and Koblenz were devastated. After the Siege of Asselt forced him to come to terms, Godfrid was granted Kennemerland, which had formerly been ruled by Rorik of Dorestad, as a vassal of Charles, according to the Annales Fuldenses. Godfrid swore oaths to Charles promising never to again lay waste to his kingdom and accepted Christianity and baptism, at which Charles stood as his godfather. In return, Charles appointed him Duke of Frisia and gave him Gisela, daughter of Lothair II, as his wife.

However, Godfrid did nothing against a Danish raid which pillaged large parts of the Low Countries in 884. In 885, he was summoned to Lobith for a meeting after being accused of complicity with Hugh, Duke of Alsace and brother of Godfrid's wife Gisela, in an insurrection. In an act of treachery he was killed by a group of Frisian and Saxon nobles at the connivance of Henry of Franconia, who had been at odds with Hugh and was against the initial appointment of Godfrid as Duke. The local count Gerulf took over the West Frisian coastline from the Danish after the murder.

This Godfrid has sometimes been confused with Godfrid Haraldsson.

== Sources ==
- Nelson, Janet L (ed.), and Reuter, Timothy (trans.) The Annals of Fulda. (Manchester Medieval series, Ninth-Century Histories, Volume II.) Manchester: Manchester University Press, 1992.
- Simon Coupland (1998), "From poachers to gamekeepers: Scandinavian warlords and Carolingian kings", Early Medieval Europe, 7: 85–114, doi:10.1111/1468-0254.00019
- MacLean, Simon. Kingship and Politics in the Late Ninth Century: Charles the Fat and the end of the Carolingian Empire. Cambridge University Press: 2003.
- Smith, Julia M. H. Province and Empire: Brittany and the Carolingians. Cambridge University Press: 1992.
