= Carolingian Coinage and the Vikings =

2007 non-fiction book by Simon Coupland

Carolingian Coinage and the Vikings: Studies on Power and Trade in the 9th Century
- Author: Simon Coupland
- Publisher: Variorum Collected Studies
- Publication date: 2007
- ISBN: 9780860789918
- OCLC: 72353531

Carolingian Coinage and the Vikings: Studies on Power and Trade in the 9th Century is a non-fiction book by Simon Coupland. It was published in 2007 by Variorum Collected Studies.
