= Rorik of Dorestad =

9th-century Danish Viking

King of Friesland
- In office 841–873

Personal details
- Born: around 800 Denmark
- Died: 882

Rorik (Latin: Roricus, Rorichus; Old Norse: Hrœrekr; c. 810 – c. 880) was a Danish Viking, who ruled over parts of Friesland between 841 and 873, conquering Dorestad and Utrecht in 850. Rorik swore allegiance to Louis the German in 873. He was born in Denmark around 800. He died at some point between 873 and 882.

== Family ==
He had a brother named Harald. Harald Klak was probably their uncle, and Godfrid Haraldsson their cousin. The identity of his father remains uncertain. There are various interpretations of the primary sources on his family, particularly because names such as Harald are repeated in the texts with little effort to distinguish one holder of a name from another. But Harald Klak had at least three brothers. Anulo (d. 812), Ragnfrid (d. 814) and Hemming Halfdansson (d. 837). Any of them could be the father of the younger Harald and Rorik. Several writers have chosen Hemming for chronological reasons, estimating Rorik was born following the 810s. This remains a plausible theory, not an unquestionable conclusion.

== Early life ==
Harald the younger had been exiled from Denmark and had raided Frisia for several years. He had entered an alliance with Lothair I who was involved in conflict against Louis the Pious, his father. Frisia was part of Louis' lands and the raids were meant to weaken him. By 841, Louis was dead and Lothair was able to grant Harald and Rorik several parts of Friesland. His goal at the time was to establish the military presence of his loyalists in Frisia, securing it against his siblings and political rivals Louis the German and Charles the Bald. The two Norsemen used islands as a main base of operations, the seat of Rorik being the island of Wieringen, while Harald operated from the island of Walcheren, and they also ruled Dorestad at this time.

In the early 840s, Frisia seemed to attract fewer raids than in the previous decade. Viking raiders were turning their attention to West Francia and Anglo-Saxon England. In 843, Lothair, Louis and Charles signed the Treaty of Verdun, settling their territorial disputes. Lothair previously needed Rorik and Harald to defend Frisia from external threats. With the seeming elimination of such threats, the two Vikings may have outlived their usefulness to their overlord. In about 844, both "fell into disgrace". They were accused of treason and imprisoned. The chronicles of the time report doubt on the accusation. Rorik would later manage to escape. Harald probably died while a prisoner.

According to an 850 entry of the Annales Fuldenses, "Hrørek the Norseman (Latin: Roric) held the vicus Dorestad as a benefice with his brother Haraldr in the time of the Emperor Louis the Pious. After the death of the emperor and his brother he was denounced as a traitor – falsely as it is said – to Lothair I, who had succeeded his father in the kingdom, and was captured and imprisoned. He escaped and became the faithful man of Louis the German. After he had stayed there for some years, living among the Saxons, who were neighbours of the Norsemen, he collected a not insubstantial force of Danes and began a career of piracy, devastating places near the northern coasts of Lothair's kingdom. And he came through the mouth of the river Rhine to Dorestad, seized and held it. Because the emperor Lothar was unable to drive him out without danger to his own men, Hrørek was received back into fealty on the advice of his counsellors and through mediators on condition that he would faithfully handle the taxes and other matters pertaining to the royal fisc, and would resist the piratical attacks of the Danes." The Annales Bertiniani also records the event: "Hrørek (Latin: Rorich), the nephew of Haraldr, who had recently defected from Lothar, raised whole armies of Norsemen with a vast number of ships and laid waste Frisia and the island of Betuwe and other places in that neighbourhood by sailing up the Rhine and the Waal. Lothar, since he could not crush him, received him into his allegiance and granted him Dorestad and other counties." The Annales Xantenses briefly report: "Hrørek the Norseman (Latin: Rorik), brother of the mentioned younger Haraldr, who was earlier dishonored by Lothar, fled, demanded Dorestad back, deceitfully inflicted much evil on the Christians."

== Ruler of Dorestad ==
After Rorik and his cousin Godfrid Haraldsson conquered Dorestad and Utrecht in 850, emperor Lothair I had to acknowledge him as ruler of most of Friesland. Dorestad had been one of the most prosperous ports in Northern Europe for quite some time. By accepting Rorik as one of his subjects, Lothair managed to keep the city as a part of his realm. His sovereignty was still recognized. For example, the coinage produced at the local mint would continue to bear the name of the emperor. On the other hand, Dorestad was already in economic decline. Leaving it to its fate was not much of a risk for the welfare of his state.

Bishop Hunger of Utrecht had to move to Deventer (to the east). Later on, together with Godfrid, Rorik went to Denmark to try to gain power during the Danish civil war of 854, but this wasn't a success. The Annales Bertiniani reports: "Lothar gave the whole of Frisia to his son Lothar, whereupon Hrørek and Gøtrik headed back to their native Denmark in the hope of gaining royal power. ... Hrørek and Gøtrik, on whom success had not smiled, remained based at Dorestad and held sway over most of Frisia.". Godfrid is not mentioned again and could have died not long of his return. The extent of Rorik's area of control at the time is uncertain. In Carolingian Coinage and the Vikings (2007), historian Simon Coupland made an educated guess based on primary sources. Rorik's recorded control over the city Gendt on the bank of the Waal River, suggests the river formed the southern border of the area. The Kennemerland is also mentioned as part of Rorik's area of control. Later negotiations with Louis the German would probably mean Rorik's area shared its eastern borders with East Francia. The western border is more obscure. Rorik and his brother controlled the islands of Zeeland in the 840s. There is no later mention of them in connection to Rorik; which could mean the ruler of Dorestad had never regained control over them.

== Expedition to Denmark ==
According to an 857 entry in the Annales Fuldenses: "Hrørek the Norseman, who ruled in Dorestad, took a fleet to the Danish boundaries with the agreement of his lord King Lothar, and with the agreement of Hørekr, king of the Danes, he and his comrades occupied the part of the kingdom which lies between the sea and the Eider." Which means Rorik, with Lothair's encouragement, went to Denmark and forced King Horik II (Erik Barn) to recognize his rule over a significant area. The Eider River formerly marked the border between Denmark and the Carolingian Empire. Coupland estimates the region gained to have lain to the north or northeast of the river and to have stretched to Schlei, a narrow inlet of the Baltic Sea. Though not mentioned by the chronicler, Rorik may have taken control over Hedeby, a significant trade center of the area. The historian considers Hedeby would be a "valuable prize" for Rorik. He considers the motivation of Lothair to be to use the new port to increase trade between his realm of Lotharingia and the region of Scandinavia. However raids in Rorik's own territory are reported by the Annales Bertiniani: "Other Danes stormed the emporium called Dorestad and ravaged the whole island of Betuwe and other neighbouring districts." Coupland considers this indicates Lothair's plans had backfired. Left unguarded, Dorestad and its surrounding area were easy prey for other Scandinavian raiders. Even Utrecht was sacked this year. The Frankish chroniclers are silent on the subject but Rorik was presumably recalled in haste by Lothair to defend Frisia. His conquests across the Danish borders were apparently short-lived. They are next mentioned as administered by Danish monarchs in 873.

== Questions on loyalty ==
An 863 entry of the Annales Bertiniani reports "In January Danes sailed up the Rhine towards Cologne, after sacking the emporium called Dorestad and also a fairly large villa at which the Frisians had taken refuge, and after slaying many Frisian traders and taking captive large numbers of people. Then they reached a certain island near the fort of Neuss. Lothar came up and attacked them with his men along one bank of the Rhine and the Saxons along the other and they encamped there until about the beginning of April. The Danes therefore followed the advice of Hrørek and withdrew by the same way they had come." The entry makes clear that another group of Danish raiders had attacked Dorestad before traveling upstream to Xanten. However a rumour soon circulated that Rorik had encouraged the raiders on their expedition. Coupland dismisses the idea that Rorik could have invited a raid on his own area. He suggests the rumour was based on his method of getting rid of the invaders. Rorik could have protected his own territory by convincing the Danes to travel further up the river, effectively letting them become other rulers' problems. Coupland notes it would not be a unique case in the 9th century. The Siege of Paris from 885 to 886 under Sigfred and Rollo had not ended with mutual annihilation. Charles the Fat had simply allowed Rollo to go and plunder Burgundy.

The rumour of Rorik's apparent disloyalty induced Hincmar, Archbishop of Reims, to write two letters, one to Hunger and one to Rorik. Bishop Hunger was instructed to impose a suitable penance on Rorik if the rumour was found to be true. Hincmar also told Rorik not to shelter Baldwin I of Flanders, who had eloped with the king's daughter Judith. From these letters it becomes clear that Rorik had recently converted to Christianity and been baptized. Flodoard summarizes the content of the two letters, the first "To Bishop Hunger about the excommunication of Baldwin, who stole the widowed Judith, the daughter of the king, to become his wife, whereupon he was excommunicated by the bishop. He also admonishes Hunger, to persuade Hrørek the Norseman, who recently was converted to the Christian faith, not to receive or protect Baldwin. And also, if other Norsemen with his consent, as has been told, should have raided the kingdom after his conversion, he should be corrected with a proper punishment.", the other "To Hrørek the Norseman, who was converted to the Christian faith, so that he always might benefit [to do] the will of God and exercise his orders. As he had heard from many to do so, that nobody should persuade him acting against the Christians with advice or aid to benefit the heathens. Else it would not have been in his advantage that he had received the Christian baptism, as he himself or through others should have planned perverse or hostile affairs, and so on. As follows, it was made clear to him in an episcopal way how much danger was hidden in such a machination. He was also admonished not to receive Baldwin, who was excommunicated by the spirit of God, for which reason the holy canon was drawn up by means of episcopal authority, because he had stolen the daughter of the king to become his wife. And he should not allowed consolation nor refuge on his part whatsoever. So he and his men should not get involved in his sins and excommunication and get doomed themselves. But he should take care to present himself in a way, that he could benefit from the prayers of the saints."

Coupland finds the contents of the letters particularly revealing. Rorik had apparently been granted control over Dorestad twice and well before his conversion to Christianity in the early 860s. Hincmar and Hunger having to convince Rorik not to give refuge to a declared enemy of Charles the Bald would mean Rorik enjoyed a "measure of political independence" from the various courts of the Carolingian dynasty at the time. Coupland notes that his contemporary Sedulius Scottus calls Rorik a King (Latin:Rex). Though noting that the reference has alternatively been interpreted to mean another contemporary ruler, Rhodri the Great of the Kingdom of Gwynedd. A hagiography of Adalbert of Egmond, written in the late 10th century, mentions a miracle of the saint in the time of "Roric the barbarian king" (Latin:Roricus barbarorum rex)

== Later rule ==
In 867 there was a local revolt by the Cokingi and Rorik was driven out of Frisia. The Annales Bertiniani report that Lothair II "summoned up the host throughout his realm to the defense of the fatherland, as he explained, against the Norsemen, for he expected, that Hrørek, whom the local people, the new name for them is Cokings, had driven out of Frisia, would return bringing some Danes to help him." Coupland notes that the identity of the Cokingi is uncertain. Also uncertain is the nature of this loss of power by Rorik. Rorik could have lost control of only part of his realm or to have resumed control rather quickly. Because he is next mentioned in 870, still in Frisia.

On 8 August 869, Lothair II died. Lotharingia was claimed by his uncles, Louis the German and Charles the Bald. In 870, the two came to an agreement with the Treaty of Meerssen which divided Lotharingia among them. The Annales Bertiniani report that Charles the Bald "went to the palace of Nijmegen to hold discussions with the Norseman Hrørek, whom he bound to himself by a treaty." Coupland considers the talks were between a ruler and a "leading local figure" of a newly annexed area. Charles secured his loyalty and recognition of his sovereignty, Rorik kept control of his region. The same type of agreement Lothair I and Lothair II had with him.

Charles and Rorik seem to have restarted negotiations in 872, according to two separate entries of the Annales Bertiniani: "On 20 January he [Charles the Bald] left Compendio and went to the monastery of [name missing in surviving manuscripts] to hold talks with the Norsemen Hrørek and Hróðulfr." ... "In October he [Charles the Bald] came by boat down the Meuse to Maastricht and held talks with the Norsemen Hrørek and Hróðulfr who had come up the river to meet him. He gave a gracious reception to Hrørek who had proved loyal to him, but Hróðulfr he dismissed empty-handed, because he had been plotting acts of treachery and pitching his demands too high. Charles prepared his faithful men for defense against treacherous attacks of Hróðulfr. Then he rode back by way of Attigny to St. Medard's Abbey, where he [Charles] spent Christmas." The "Hróðulfr" of the text was Rudolf Haraldsson, a presumed nephew of Rorik. The Annales Xantenses mention him as "nepos" of Rorik which typically means "nephew". However like in the term "Cardinal-nephew" (Latin: cardinalis nepos); the term can also have the meaning of "relative" without specifying the relation. Coupland suggests the monastery mentioned was Moustier-sur-Sambre in the modern Namur province of Belgium, close to the former borders of Lotharingia. The reason and nature of these negotiations is obscure.

In 873, Rorik swore allegiance to Louis, and that is the last that is heard of him. The Annales Xantenses report: "Likewise came to him [Louis] Hrørek, the gall of Christianity, nevertheless many hostages were put back in the ships and he became subject of the king and was bound by an oath to keep a firm loyalty." Coupland notes that Rorik held lands in both sides of the current border between the realms of Charles and Louis. Which would mean he owed loyalty to both of them. Leaving him in an "unenviable position".

== Death ==
Rorik died before 882 when his lands were given to Sea-King Godfried. According to the Annales Bertiniani: "Charles, who had the title of emperor, marched against the Norsemen with a large army and advanced right up to their fortification. Once he got there, however, his courage failed him. Through the intervention of certain men, he managed to reach an agreement with Gøtrik and his men on the following terms: namely that Gøtrik would be baptized, and would then receive Frisia and the other regions that Hrørek had held." Dorestad was in economic decline throughout his reign, merchants migrating to cities less exposed to the constant fighting like Deventer and Tiel. Both of the latter were developing into "merchant towns" at the time.

Coupland considers Rorik "the most powerful and influential of all the Danes drawn into the Carolingian milieu" of the 9th century. He notes how four Carolingian monarchs (Lothair I, Lothair II, Charles the Bald, Louis the German) accepted his presence in Frisia and his continued service as their vassal. Little criticism against him was recorded in the Frankish chronicles of his time. Even Hincmar did not outright accuse him and expected him to accept penance like a good Christian, which indicated the Franks had ceased thinking of him as a foreign element to their realm, regarding Rorik as one of their own. The historian also notes that there are only two recorded raids of his area in twenty-three known years of rule, a record of his effectiveness in defense in an era of turbulence.

== Rorik and Rurik ==
Numerous scholars identified Rorik with Rurik, the founder of the Rurikid dynasty. The suggestion is based on the disappearance of Rorik from Frankish chronicles during the 860s, consistent with the appearance of Rurik in Novgorod in 862, but inconsistent with his remaining in power there until 879.

The first identification to this effect was made by Hermann Hollmann in 1816. He stressed the importance of the locality of Rustringen, in Lower Saxony, as the possible origin of Rurik. In 1836, Friedrich Kruse also supported such a view. The hypothesis was revived strongly by N. T. Belyaev in 1929.

Such an identification is not conclusive, and does not appear to have support from the majority of scholars. Yet there are a number of prominent Russian academics, such as A. N. Kirpichnikov, Boris Rybakov, Dmitry Machinsky, and Igor Dubov, who have supported this identification to some extent.

== See also ==
- Scylding (dynasty)
- Rurik Dynasty
- Shum Gora
- Rikiwulf
- Godfrid, Duke of Frisia
