= Annales Bertiniani =

Chronicle of Carolingian Francia from 830 to 882

Annales Bertiniani (Annals of Saint Bertin) are late Carolingian Frankish annals that were found in the Abbey of Saint Bertin, Saint-Omer, France, after which they are named. Their account is taken to cover the period 830–882, thus continuing the Royal Frankish Annals (741–829), from which, however, it has circulated independently in only one manuscript. They are available in the Monumenta Germaniæ Historica, and also in later editions, including the French edition taking into account a newly discovered manuscript.

The Annals of St. Bertin are one of the principal sources of ninth-century Francia, and are particularly well-informed on events in the West Frankish sphere of Charles the Bald. The Annales Fuldenses are usually read as an East Frankish counterpart to their narrative.

== Authorship and manuscripts ==
It has been suggested that the annals were first written by scribes in the court of Louis the Pious. There is no doubt that they were later continued as an independent narrative, eventually becoming somewhat emancipated from the Palace since the early 840s, first by Prudentius of Troyes (†861) and thereafter Hincmar of Reims (until 882), on whose lost manuscript their tradition is almost entirely dependent. Moreover, there are strong hints that the original text of the annals underwent at least minor changes under the latter's supervision.

== Sources ==
The annals' account is mostly first-hand and includes documents such as papal letters and excerpts from conciliar acts.

== Content ==
The text is characterized by the struggles between the Carolingians, their relations to the Holy Roman Church – "sancta romana ecclesia" – and as well the raids from neighbouring regions. Amongst these last are the practically annual reports of raids carried out by various warrior-bands from Scandinavia – who are now popularly known as Vikings.

=== The Scandinavian raids ===
During the ninth century, these warrior-bands regularly laid waste to the lands of the Frisians, sailed up rivers like the Seine, Loire, and Rhine, where they caused great devastation in the country, and plundered Carolingian monasteries and episcopal cities. After 841, only in the years 874 and 875 are there no references to Viking activity. There is much to read in the annals, and the narrative sheds also some light on the many incidents that form the scenario in which Scandinavians came to more formal, i.e. diplomatic and ecclesiastic, relations with their southern neighbours – for example the Normans' fealty to King Charles III of West Francia in 911.

The concentration on ecclesiastic centres, which presumably housed vast amounts of movable wealth, has led some historians to believe that contemporary source writers, i.e. clergymen – including Prudentius and Hincmar, which are believed to have had at least editorial influence on the annals – exaggerated their accounts of the raids because they were usually the invaders' primary targets and frequently had to foot the bill when kings agreed to pay the Vikings off, as Charles the Fat did at the Siege of Paris in 885–886.

Most scholars now believe the Vikings posed little more than a persistent, niggling military threat to the Carolingian regime.

=== The Rus' ===
The annals are notable, among other things, for containing one of the earliest written references to Rus'. According to the annals, a group of followers to the emissaries from Constantinople was presented through a letter handed over to the emperor by the emissaries. The letter stated that they called themselves Rhos – "qi se, id est gentem suam, Rhos vocari dicebant" – and had journeyed to Constantinople; but now they were fearful to return home, because the roads they had travelled were not safe. They had therefore set out with the Byzantine embassy hoping to obtain the Franks' assent for travelling via Germany. At Ingelheim royal residence, near Mainz, they were queried by Frankish Emperor Louis the Pious, as he suspected they might be on reconnaissance (Latin: exploratores), and they could assure him in the rationale for their northern destination, as they belonged to the Sueones: "eos gentis esse Sueonum". He decided to keep them by him until it could be ascertained for sure whether they had come in earnest purpose or not, and they are not mentioned again in the annals. This incident is mentioned under the year 839.

A still ongoing polemic involves the phrase "rex illorum chacanus" (Note: Misit etiam cum eis quosdam, qui se, id est gentem suam, Rhos vocari dicebant, quos rex illorum chacanus vocabulo ad se amicitiae, sicut asserebant, causa direxerat, petends per memoratam epistolam... ("He also sent with them some, who said that they – that is, their people – were called Rhos, whom their king chacanus had directed to him for the cause of friendship, as they asserted, requesting by the above-mentioned letter..."). In a Latin footnote to the word chacanus, which he does not capitalise, Waitz stated: Non nomen proprium, sed titulus populis Asiae septentrionalis usitatus, hic perperam ad Sueones translatus esse videtur. ("Not a proper name, but a customary title of people of northern Asia, here seems to have been wrongly translated to the Sueones.") or "rex illorum chaganus". Initially edited by Pertz (1826) with the capitalized C ("rex illorum Chacanus", the phrase was understood as a personal name of the Rus' ruler. Garipzanov (2006) has recently made observations on the likelihood that chacanus is the correct, i.e. original term. The traditional interpretation is that 'rex illorum chacanus' is meant to be understood as khagan, not actually a person's name, but instead an entirely foreign kind of sovereignty. However, there is an alternative interpretation, that Chacanus is a Latin transcription of the Scandinavian proper name Håkan since in mainstream scholarship the Rus' people, who lived in northern Russia, had their ancestral homeland in Sweden. Garipzanov holds to the latter and finds that the form 'chacanus' is a unique occurrence in Frankish sources; variants hereof, in the Carolingian sources, that do signify the foreign form of sovereignty are caganus, chagan, kagan and also chaganum. Scholars have also sought to establish a connection between the Rus'-Byzantine embassy to Louis the Pious and contemporary events in the Eastern Empire, as recorded in the Life of St. George of Amastris, one of the earliest Greek sources on the Rus'.

The narrative came to an end in 882 when an elderly, frail Hincmar was forced to flee his cathedral at Reims from approaching Viking invaders. The scholar-bishop died shortly after at Épernay, and the narrative was not continued.

The Annals of St. Bertin is one of five major independent narrative accounts of the late 9th century. The others are:

- The Annals of Fulda (838–901)
- The Annals of St. Vaast (874–900)
- The Annals of Xanten (832–874)
- The Chronicle of Regino of Prüm (870–906)

== Literature ==
- Coupland, Simon; Nelson, Janet (1988). "The Vikings on the Continent". History Today. 38 (12): 12–19.
- Garipzanov, Ildar (2006). "The Annals of St. Bertin (839) and Chacanus of the Rhos". Ruthenica. 5. NASU Institute of History of Ukraine (Instytut istoriï Ukraïny NAN Ukraïny): 7–11. OCLC 54413298.
- Grat, Félix; Jeanne Vielliard; Suzanne Clemancet, eds. (1964). Annales de Saint-Bertin (avec une introduction et des notes par Léon Levillain). Société de Histoire de France. Vol. 470. Paris: C. Klincksieck.
- Jones, Gwyn (2001). A History of the Vikings. Oxford: Oxford University Press. p. 504. ISBN 9780192801340. (first published 1968, second edition 1984, reissued 2001)
- Nelson, Janet L., ed. (1991). The Annals of St-Bertin. Manchester: Manchester University Press.
- Nelson, Janet L. (2013) [1992]. Charles the Bald. London and New York: Routledge.
- Pertz, Georgius Heinricus, ed. (1826). "Annales Bertiniani". Monumenta Germaniae Historica: Scriptores. Vol. 1. Hannoverae: Impensis Bibliopolii Aulici Hahniani. pp. 419–515.
- Rau, Reinhold, ed. (1958). Quellen zur Karolingischen Reichsgeschichte, II: Jahrbücher von St. Bertin: Jahrbücher von St. Vaast: Xantener Jahrbücher. Darmstadt: Wissenschaftliche Buchgesellschaft.
- Sawyer, Peter (1971). The Age of the Vikings. London.
- Waitz, Georgius, ed. (1883). Annales Bertiniani. Hannoverae: Impensis Bibliopolii Hahniani.
- "Norman". Encyclopædia Britannica. 2015.
