= Royal Frankish Annals =

Chronicle of Carolingian Francia from 741 to 829

Annales regni Francorum
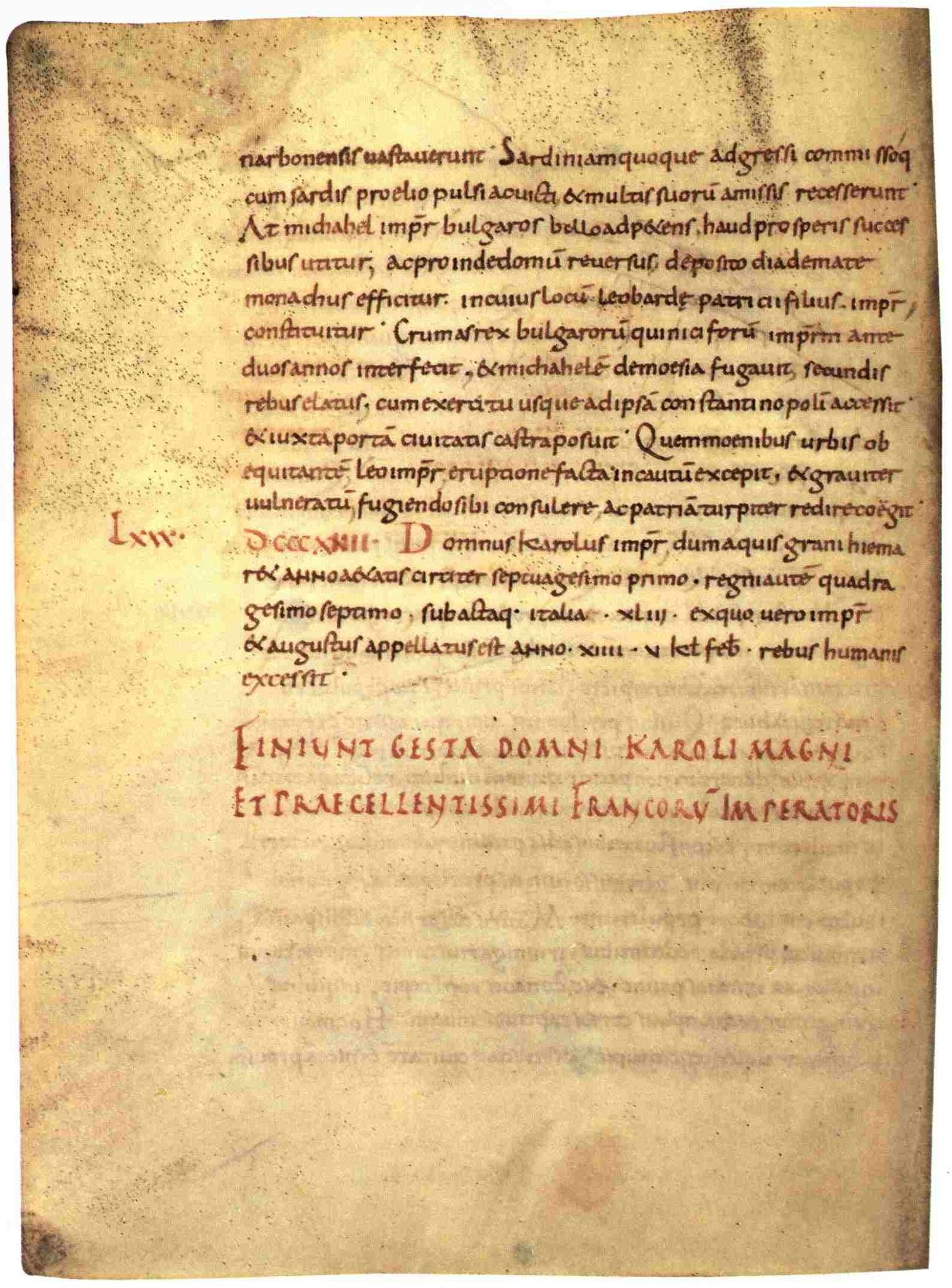
- Annales regni Francorum, entry for AD 814
- Also known as: Annales Laurissenses maijores Annales qui dicuntur Einhardi; Royal Frankish Annals; Reichsannalen
- Author(s): Unknown
- Ascribed to: Einhard, Hilduin
- Language: Latin
- Date: Late 8th century through early 9th century
- Provenance: Francia
- Genre: Chronicle
- Subject: Account of the history of the Carolingian monarchy

The Royal Frankish Annals (Latin: Annales regni Francorum), also called the Annales Laurissenses maiores ('Greater Lorsch Annals'), are a series of annals composed in Latin in Carolingian Francia, recording year-by-year the state of the monarchy from 741 (the death of Charles Martel) to 829 (the beginning of the crisis of Louis the Pious). Their authorship is unknown, though Wilhelm von Giesebrecht suggested that Arno of Salzburg was the author of an early section surviving in the copy at Lorsch Abbey. The Annals are believed to have been composed in successive sections by different authors, and then compiled.

The depth of knowledge regarding court affairs suggests that the annals were written by persons close to the king, and their initial reluctance to comment on Frankish defeats betrays an official design for use as Carolingian propaganda. Though the information contained within is heavily influenced by authorial intent in favor of the Franks, the annals remain a crucial source on the political and military history of the reign of Charlemagne.

Copies of the annals can be categorized into five classes, based on additions and revisions to the text. The chronicles were continued and incorporated in the West Frankish Annales Bertiniani and in the East Frankish Annales Fuldenses and Annales Xantenses.

== Content ==
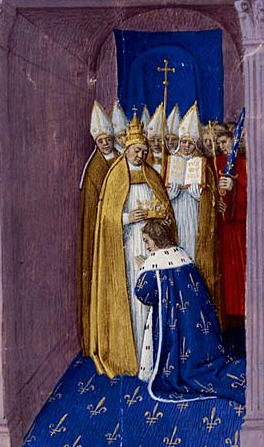
The coronation in 752 of Pépin the Short by Boniface, Archbishop of Mainz.

The annals give a brief individual description of events for each year (a few omitted), with a focus on the actions of the Carolingian monarchy, beginning with the account of Pepin the Short's ascension through the dethronement of the Merovingian king Childeric III. The annalists pay particular attention to the military campaigns of the Carolingian kings, justifying their actions in terms of a grand narrative of Carolingian peacekeeping and conquest in the name of expanding the Christian faith. The overthrow of the Merovingians is also portrayed in such a way as to legitimize the transfer of royal power between dynasties, emphasizing Carolingian adherence to Frankish traditions and the approval of Pope Zacharias in the matter.

Of the three kings—Pepin, Charlemagne, and Louis—Charlemagne's military chronicles are the most detailed, covering his victories against the Saxons, Bretons, and other peoples. The account of Charlemagne's campaign against the Saxons is also notable as one of the few extant references to the Irminsul, an important if enigmatic part of the Germanic paganism practiced by the Saxons at the time. Its destruction is a major point in the annals, written to continue a jingoistic theme of Frankish triumphs against the "un-Frankish" and unchristian barbarian. The unrevised text neglects to mention defeats suffered by Charlemagne, such as the Battle of Roncevaux Pass in 778 (later dramatized in the Song of Roland) and the Battle of Süntel in 782.

The Battle of Süntel is portrayed in the annals as a victory, as opposed to a crushing Frankish defeat at the hands of the Saxons. The 792 conspiracy of Pepin the Hunchback against Charlemagne is also omitted, along with any reference to potential misconduct on Charlemagne's part. The revised text, however, incorporates these events while maintaining a positive tone towards the emperor, presented as a peerless leader in battle.

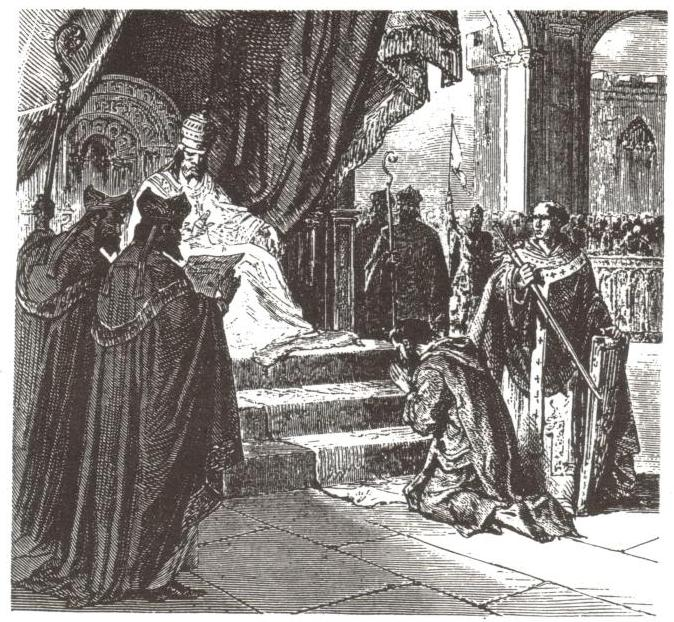
Louis the Pious giving penance at Attigny in 822.

Charlemagne's son, Louis the Pious, is rarely shown engaging in battle by the annalists, but rather directs others to do so, or negotiates for peace. The contrast between Louis and his father and grandfather is clear. While the past kings were unshakeable figures, depicted as the better of their foes even in defeat by the revised edition, the annalists’ Louis is a smaller man who invests the power of the military in others, not unlike the annals' earlier depiction of the Merovingian kings. Miracles aid Charlemagne and his men, and the grace of God leads him to victory; mostly ill portents surround Louis, such as an omen in the stars supposedly foretelling his army's defeat at the hands of Count Aizo, and the sudden collapse of a wooden arcade atop him in 817.

Such references to striking natural phenomena, strange happenings, and miracles become increasingly common in the annal entries for the 9th century. In addition to astronomical oddities, such as eclipses, the supernatural begins to enter the account, set against almost ritualistic yearly notices of the regular passages of Christmas and Easter. Nearly two-dozen villages are reported to have been destroyed by heavenly fire in 823, while at the same time an unnamed girl is said to have begun a three-year fast.

Scholz regards this preoccupation as a reflection of a belief in a divine will and control of history. Many of the worse omens also parallel growing dissatisfaction with Louis the Pious, which immediately after the end of the annals spilled into civil war between him and his sons. Divine intervention through the relics of saints play an important role as well, with mention of Hilduin's translation of the relics of St. Sebastian to the Abbey of St. Medard, and Einhard's transport of the relics of SS. Marcellinus and Peter into Francia.

A more detailed account of Einhard's procurement of the relics exists in his Translation and Miracles of Marcellinus and Peter. Additionally, the annals provide the only attestation to the existence of Charlemagne's personal elephant Abul-Abbas, aside from a mention by Einhard drawn from the annals. The gift of the elephant to Charlemagne, amongst other treasures, by Abbasid Caliph Harun al-Rashid is evidence of the attempts to form an Abbasid-Carolingian alliance at the time, which the annals document loosely.

== Classification ==
The annals survive in multiple versions, widely distributed across the Frankish empire, though none of these are original copies. Each version is marked with distinguishing features, and based on these features, Friedrich Kurze formulated five classes for the categorization of these texts. This system still remains in use. The five classes of texts are lettered A through D, with an additional E class for the revised text. They are as follows:

=== Class A ===
Class A texts end at the year 788, and are reflected in one of the earliest modern printings of the annals, that of Heinrich Canisius's Francicorum Annalium fragmentum. Canisius also includes the years up to 793 in his printing, however, and Rosamond McKitterick speculates that the manuscript originally ran to that date. These manuscripts are now lost.

=== Class B ===
Class B texts go to, at the latest, 813. Kurze notes that one of these was used by Regino of Prüm in his Chronicon.

=== Class C ===
Class C texts are complete through 829. These contain various additions not found in the previous two classes, and Kurze divides them based on what other texts are found in their codices, such as the Liber historiae Francorum.

=== Class D ===
Class D texts are derived from a complete copy, though McKitterick points out that the derivatives are often not complete themselves. These also contain insertions not found in the other classes, including mention of Pepin the Hunchback. The revised texts are based on a Class D manuscript.

=== Class E ===
Class E comprises the revised editions of the annals, and are by far the most numerous. These are often found paired with Einhard's Vita Karoli Magni, and it is partially from this that they are sometimes believed to have been written by him as well, and thus called the Annales qui dicuntur Einhardi (English: Annals which are said to be of Einhard). The revised editions correct the Latin of the originals and elaborate on many of the earlier entries, which were written by a terse hand in their unedited states. The major edits go up to 801, with minor stylistic changes through 812.

== Authorship ==
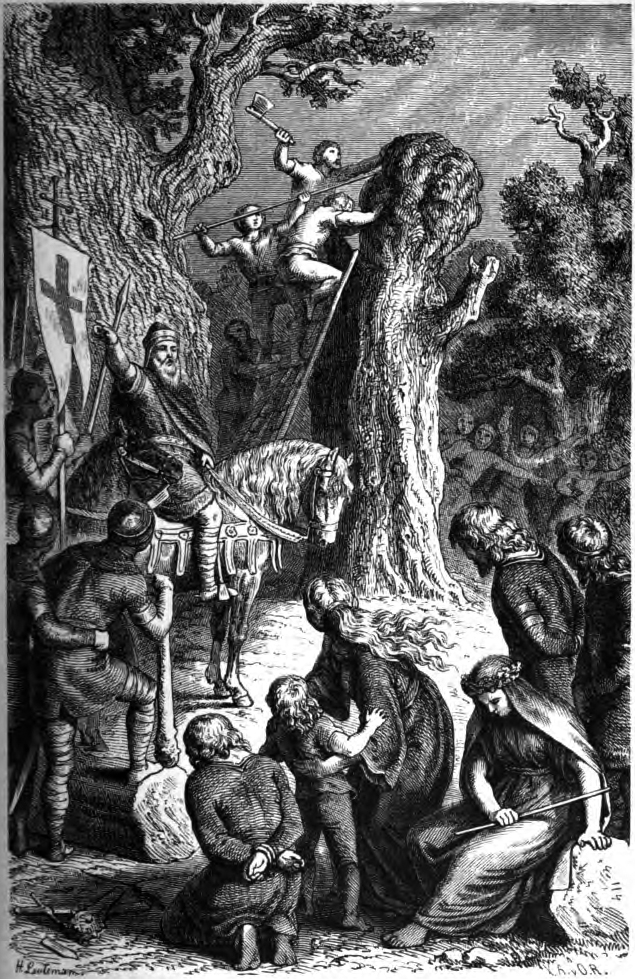
"The destruction of Irminsul by Charlemagne" (1882) by Heinrich Leutemann.

Though the number of sections into which the annals should be divided is debated, they undoubtedly were written in at least four stages, corresponding roughly to the entries for 741-795, 796-807, 808-819, and 820-829. Additionally, an unknown editor produced the revised text at some point during the third stage. The identities of any of the authors save that of the fourth section are unknown, but production by a group of clerics associated with the Carolingian court is likely.

=== The First Section (741-795) ===
Between the years 741 and 768, the annals overlap with the continuations of the Chronicle of Fredegar. On account of this, scholars such as Scholz have suggested that the annals are based on the continuation of Fredegar up to 768, and then on minor annals up to some point between 787 and 793. McKitterick, however, contends that the continuation of Fredegar and the minor annals are more likely based upon the Annales regni Francorum, which is the most ordered and precise of them. Neither argument considers these entries to be contemporaneous with the events described. The manner of reporting for these years is typically terse, though they include the convention of mentioning Easter and Christmas, which continues throughout the annals.

The author of this section is unknown. Scholz posits the work of multiple authors in the royal chapel. The year 795 is not definitive as the date of authorial change, but it is the latest of those suggested.

=== The Second Section (796-807) ===
Unlike the first section, these entries were written contemporaneously and with greater depth. Considering this and the fact that the subject matter remains fixed on the actions of Charlemagne, composition by members of the royal chapel again seems likely, as few other groups would have had access to the same information. However, the identities of these authors remains unknown.

=== The Third Section (808-819) ===
This section, as well as the fourth, are also both contemporaneous accounts. Scholz notes an increased eloquence in the language employed from here on. At this time, the editor of the revised edition also began his work on the earlier entries, bringing the Latin up to a similar level as the new entries and adding lengthy passages where detail was lacking, again in the style of the later years. For this reason, the editor is believed to have belonged to or been affiliated with this third group of authors.

=== The Fourth Section (809-829) ===
This section ends abruptly after the events of 829, and for this reason has been associated with Hilduin of St. Denis. The case for his authorship is founded on Hilduin's involvement in the first civil war between Louis and his sons in 830. In that year, he left the emperor's service to join the sons’ uprising and was subsequently banished, which would account for the termination of the annals. His increasing distaste for Louis would also correspond with the veiled negativity towards the emperor which surfaces in the later entries of the annal, in the form of faint praise and the recording of omens and disasters. Additionally, the entry for 826 mentions Hilduin's translation of relics, and is followed in 827 by Einhard's translation. The inclusion of these somewhat obscure events, both of which Hilduin was involved with, would be explained by his authorship of the section.

=== The Revised Text ===
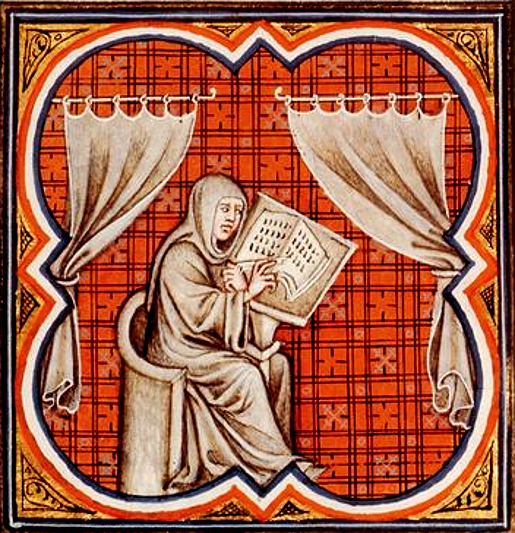
An illustration of Einhard, to whom the revised text is often ascribed.

The revised text is believed to have been edited after Charlemagne's death in 814 but prior to Einhard's Vita Karoli Magni, which references the revisions, written in 833 at the latest. It covers the years 741 through 812, variously adding detail and modifying style. Leopold von Ranke put forth Einhard as the editor, an association which has carried with the revised annals in references to the Annales qui dicuntur Einhardi. However, while no other names have been suggested for the editor, the case for Einhard cannot be argued definitively either.

== Legacy ==
Three major annals take up the work of the Annales regni Francorum after 829: the Annales Bertiniani, the Annales Fuldenses, and the Annales Xantenses. The Annales Bertiniani concern the West Frankish Kingdom from 830 to 882, serving as a direct unofficial continuation. The Annales Fuldenses use the Annales regni Francorum as a basis up to the year 829, and then continue on their own until 901, documenting the East Frankish Kingdom. The Annales Xantenses run from 832 to 873 and are largely independent from the other two continuations.

== Text Sources ==
=== Latin ===
- Heinrich Canisius’s Francicorum Annalium fragmentum in Antiquae Lectiones, Book III (Class A).
- The Annales regni Francorum at The Latin Library (Class C).
- The Annales regni Francorum in Scriptores rerum Germanicarum in usum scholarum separatim editi from Monumenta Germaniae Historica, with preface and classifications by Friedrich Kurze (Composite).

=== English ===
- English translation of the composite text, with annotations and an introductory study, was published in 1970 by Bernhard Walter Scholz and Barbara Rogers.
- English translation is also included in a collection of translated sources on Charlemagne, published in 1987 by Paul David King.

== See also ==
- Reichsannalen

== Sources ==
- Boyd, Kelly, ed. Encyclopedia of Historians and Historical Writers (Rutledge, 1999) 1:35-36.
- King, Paul David, ed. (1987). Charlemagne: Translated Sources. Lambrigg, Kendal: King.
- Kurze, Fridericus, ed. (1895). Annales regni Francorum inde ab a. 741 usque ad a. 829 qui dicuntur Annales Laurissenses maiores et Einhardi. Hannoverae: Impensis Bibliopolii Hahniani.
- McKitterick, Rosamond (2000). "The Illusion of Royal Power in the Carolingian Annals". English Historical Review. 115 (460): 1–20.
- McKitterick, Rosamond (2004). History and Memory in the Carolingian World. Cambridge: Cambridge University Press.
- McKitterick, Rosamond (2008). Charlemagne: The Formation of a European Identity. Cambridge: Cambridge University Press.
- Pertz, Georgius Heinricus, ed. (1826). "Annales Laurissenses et Einhardi". Monumenta Germaniae Historica: Scriptores. Vol. 1. Hannoverae: Impensis Bibliopolii Aulici Hahniani. pp. 124–218.
- Pertz, Georgius Heinricus, ed. (1845). Einhardi Annales. Hannoverae: Impensis Bibliopolii Hahniani.
- Scholz, Bernhard Walter; Rogers, Barbara, eds. (1970). Carolingian Chronicles: Royal Frankish Annals and Nithard's Histories. Ann Arbor: University of Michigan Press.
- Živković, Tibor (2010). "The 'Original' and the 'Revised' Annales Regni Francorum" (PDF). Историјски часопис. 59: 9–57. Archived from the original on 2022-11-26.
- Živković, Tibor (2011). "The Origin of the Royal Frankish Annalist's Information about the Serbs in Dalmatia". Споменица академика Симе Ћирковића. Београд: Историјски институт. pp. 381–398.
