= Mansus =

A mansus, sometimes anglicised as manse, was a unit of land assessment in medieval France, roughly equivalent of the hide. In the 9th century AD, it began to be used by Charlemagne to determine how many warriors would be provided: one for every three (later four) mansi, with smaller landholders collectively forming groups of three (later four). The mansus was also used to determine the amount of equipment expected.

== See also ==
- Units of measurement in France before the French Revolution

== Sources ==
- Halsall, Guy. Warfare and Society in the Barbarian West, 450-900 (London: Routledge, 2003), p. 93.
