= Ignatios the Deacon =

Byzantine cleric and writer

Ignatios the Deacon (Greek: Ἰγνάτιος ὁ Διάκονος, 780/790 – after 845) was a Byzantine cleric and writer. Left an orphan as a child, he was educated under the auspices of Patriarch Tarasios of Constantinople, and rose in the church hierarchy under Tarasios' successor, Nikephoros I, becoming a deacon and skeuophylax of the Hagia Sophia. After the start of the second period of the Byzantine Iconoclasm ca. 814, he sided with the iconoclasts, becoming metropolitan bishop of the prestigious see of Nicaea, probably in the 830s. He later reversed his stance, however, and retired as a monk at about the time of the definite end of Iconoclasm in 843. Ignatios was the confirmed or probable author of several saints' lives (hagiographies), funeral elegies, letters and poems.

== Sources ==
- Kazhdan, Alexander (1991). "Ignatios the Deacon". In Kazhdan, Alexander (ed.). The Oxford Dictionary of Byzantium. New York and Oxford: Oxford University Press. p. 984. ISBN 978-0-19-504652-6.
- Winkelmann, Friedhelm; Lilie, Ralph-Johannes; et al. (2000). "Ignatios Diakonos (#2665)". Prosopographie der mittelbyzantinischen Zeit: I. Abteilung (641–867), 2. Band: Georgios (#2183) – Leon (#4270) (in German). Walter de Gruyter. pp. 166–173. ISBN 3-11-016672-0.
- Efthymiadis, S. (1997). The correspondence of Ignatios, the Deacon. Greece: Dumbarton Oaks Research Library and Collection. ISBN 978-0-88402-243-5
