= Godfrid Haraldsson =

Danish royalty

Godfrid Haraldsson (c. 820 – c. 856) was the son of the Danish king Harald Klak. In 826 he was baptized together with his parents in Mainz in the Frankish Empire, with crown prince Lothair standing as a godparent.

After his baptism, Godfrid stayed in Lothair's retinue, until they fell out sometime in the 840s, and Godfrid returned to Denmark. There he teamed up with Rorik, the son of his father's brother (his cousin). In 850 they united against Lothair and raided Dorestad. Rorik took possession of Frisia. Godfrid continued to plunder Flanders and Artois, and returned to Denmark for the winter. In 851 he was back, raiding in Frisia and around the Rhine, then sailed up the Scheldt to attack Ghent and the abbey of Drongen.

After another winter in Denmark, Godfred returned again in 853 to Francia. On 9 October 853 he sailed up the Seine. The fleet advanced beyond Rouen, as far as Pont-de-l'Arche, and encamped on an island near Les Andelys. Charles the Bald summoned his army as well as that of the Middle Kingdom of Lothar, Godfred's godfather. The two sides faced each other the whole winter, the Frankish land army lacking boats to attack the Vikings. The stalemate was resolved in the spring of 854 when Godfred sailed away, probably with a tribute.

In 855 Godfred and his cousin Rorik tried to gain power in Denmark after the death of king Horik I. The attempt failed, and they returned the same year, taking back Dorestad and a large part of the area of what is now The Netherlands. After this, the sources are silent about this Godfred. He probably died soon afterwards.

== Literature ==
- Simon Coupland (1998), "From poachers to gamekeepers: Scandinavian warlords and Carolingian kings", Early Medieval Europe, 7: 85–114, doi:10.1111/1468-0254.00019
