= Georg Heinrich Pertz =

German historian and librarian (1795–1876)

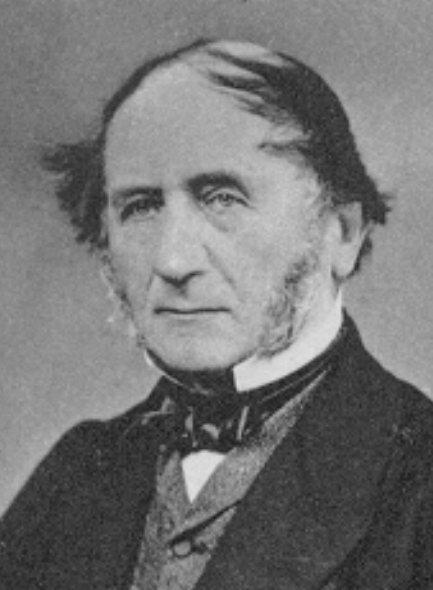
- Georg Heinrich Pertz
- Born: 28 March 1795; Hanover
- Died: 7 October 1876 (aged 81); Munich
- Education: Georg August University, Göttingen
- Occupations: historian; librarian
- Notable work: Monumenta Germaniae Historica
- Spouse(s): Julia Philippa Garnett (died 1852); Leonora Horner
- Children: 6+

Georg Heinrich Pertz (28 March 1795 – 7 October 1876) was a German historian and librarian.

== Personal life ==
Pertz was born in Hanover on 28 March 1795. His parents were the court bookbinder Christian August Pertz and Henrietta Justina née Deppen.

He married twice. His first marriage was in 1827 with Julia Philippa Pertz, née Garnett (born 1793; died 22 or 25 July 1852). She was a daughter of English astronomer John Garnett. Their first son was born prior to the marriage (Karl August Pertz, born 21 May 1825 in Hanover) and they had four more children, Karl August Friedrich Pertz (1828–1881), his twin sister (1828 – 20 January 1829), Georg Pertz (1830–1870) and the engineer Hermann Pertz (1833–1881), who died while building a railway in England.

His second marriage in 1854 was with Leonora Horner, who was a daughter of the Scottish geologist, social and educational reformer Leonard Horner. They had several children including the botanist Dora Pertz.

He died in Munich on 7 October 1876 while attending the sittings of a historical commission and was buried in Berlin.

== Career ==
From 1813 to 1818 he studied history and philology at the University of Göttingen, chiefly under A. H. L. Heeren. His graduation thesis, published in 1819, on the history of the Merovingian Mayors of the Palace, attracted the attention of the Prussian reformer Baron Stein, by whom he was employed in 1820 to edit the Carolingian chroniclers for the newly founded Historical Society of Germany. In search of materials for this purpose, Pertz made a prolonged tour through Germany and Italy, and on his return in 1823 Stein entrusted him with publication of the series Monumenta Germaniae Historica, texts of all important historical writers on German affairs before 1500, as well as of laws, imperial and regal archives, and other valuable documents, such as letters, falling within this period. Pertz made frequent research visits to the leading libraries and public record offices of Europe.

In 1821 he was made secretary of the archives, and in 1827 principal keeper of the royal library at Hanover; from 1832 to 1837 he edited the Hannoverische Zeitung, and more than once sat as representative in the Hanoverian second chamber. In 1842 he was chief librarian at the Royal Library in Berlin, where he shortly afterwards was made a privy councillor and a member of the Academy of Sciences. He resigned all his appointments in 1874.

The Monumenta began to appear in 1826, and at the date of his resignation 24 folio volumes in the series Scriptores, Leges, and Diplomata had appeared. This work for the first time made possible the existence of the modern school of scientific historians of medieval Germany. In connection with the Monumenta Pertz also began the publication of a selection of sources in octavo format, the Scriptores rerum germanicarum in usum scholarum. Among his other literary works was an edition of the Gesammelte Werke of Leibniz, and a life of Stein (Leben des Ministers Freiherrn vom Stein (6 vols, 1849–1855)).

== Works ==
- Pertz, Georg Heinrich, ed. (1845). Einhardi Annales. Hanover.

== Legacy ==
A street in Hanover's Kleefeld district was named Pertzstrasse in his honour in 1937.
