= Annales Xantenses =

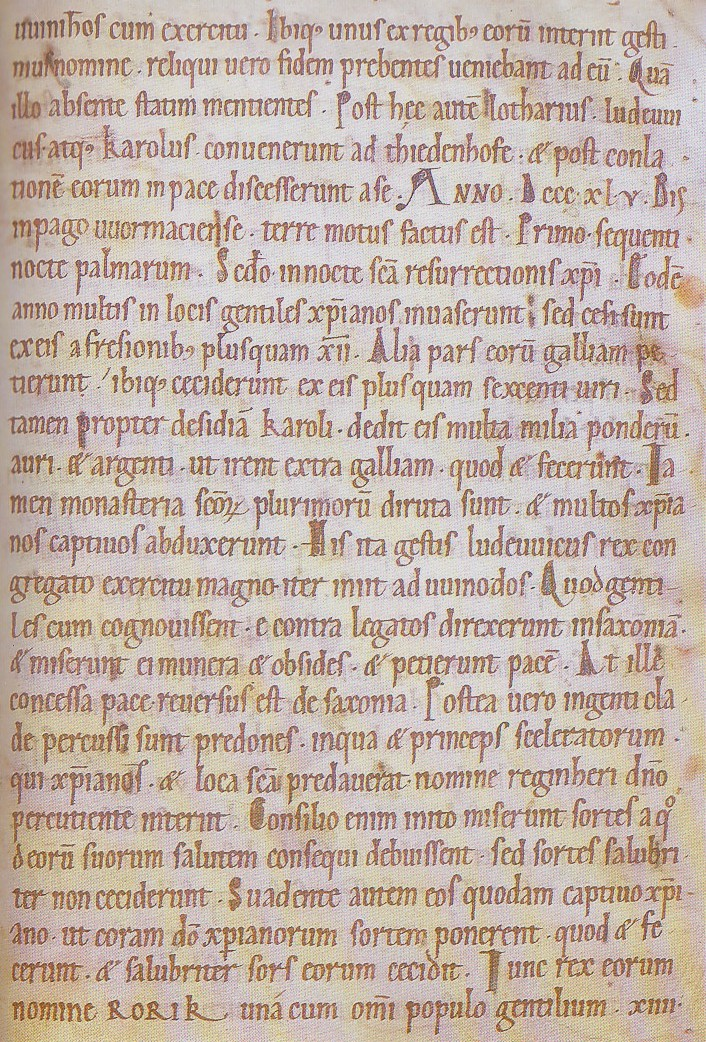
Annales Xantenses, unknown date, Cotton MS Tiberius C XI.

The Annales Xantenses or Annals of Xanten are a series of annals which adapt and continue the Royal Frankish Annals. Their first modern editor, Georg Pertz, thought they were perhaps written at the monastery at Xanten, hence their name. However, according to Heinz Löwe, the entries from 790 to around 860 were probably written at Lorsch by Gerward, a royal chaplain. Löwe suggests that the manuscript subsequently passed to Cologne, and around 871 new entries were written there for the years from 861 onwards. This part of the text is hostile to Archbishop Gunthar of Cologne.

The annals survive in a single twelfth-century manuscript in London at the British Library, manuscript Cotton Tiberius C.XI.

== Sources ==
- Pertz, Georgius Heinricus, ed. (1829). "Annales Xantenses". Monumenta Germaniae Historica: Scriptores. Vol. 2. Hannoverae: Impensis Bibliopolii Aulici Hahniani. pp. 217–235.
- Rau, Reinhold, ed. (1958). Quellen zur Karolingischen Reichsgeschichte, II: Jahrbücher von St. Bertin: Jahrbücher von St. Vaast: Xantener Jahrbücher. Darmstadt: Wissenschaftliche Buchgesellschaft.
- Simson, Bernhard, ed. (1909). Annales Xantenses et Annales Vedastini (PDF). Hannoverae et Lipsiae: Impensis Bibliopolii Hahniani.
