= Gróa =

Legendary Finnish princess

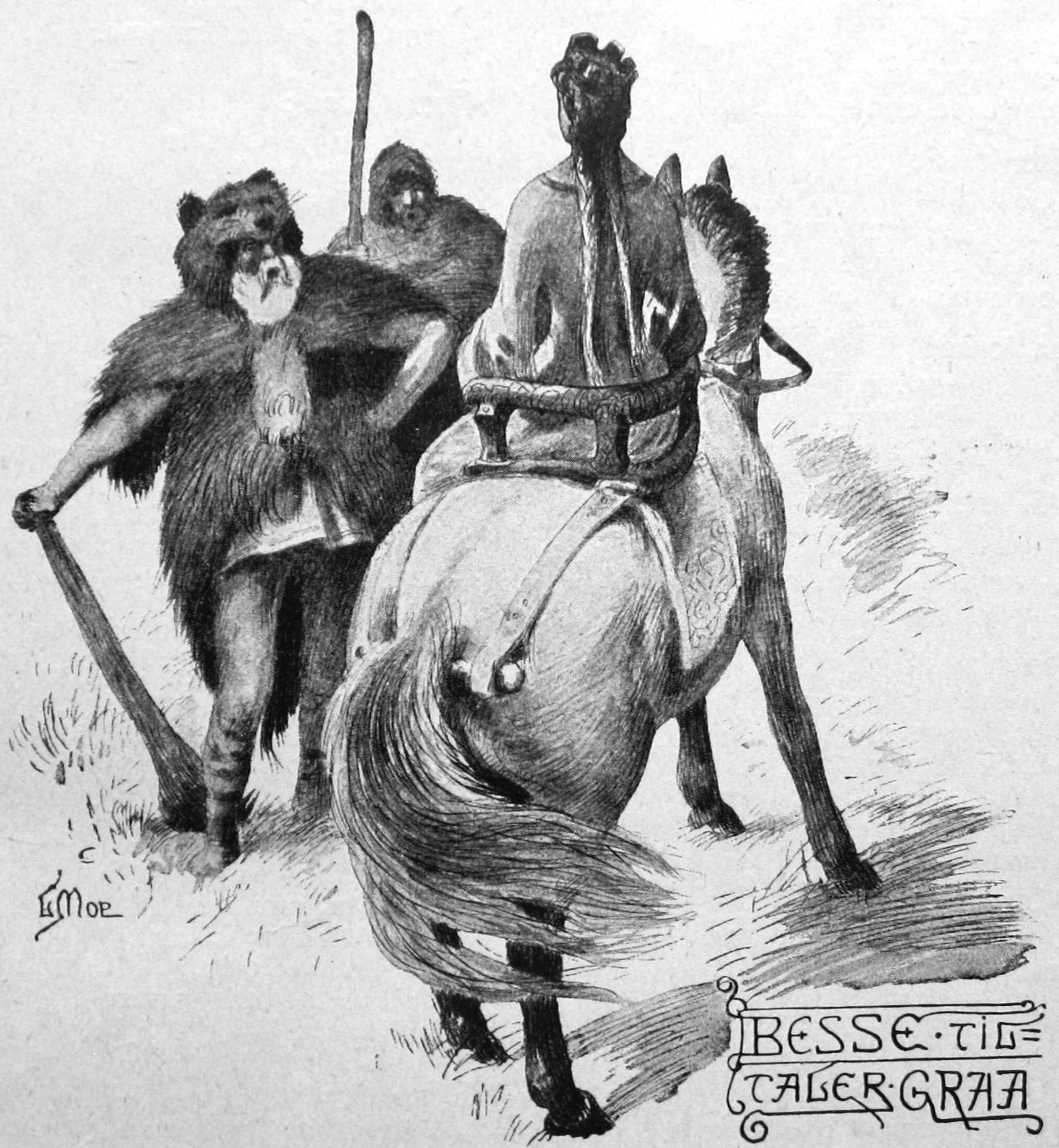

Queen of the Danes
- Predecessor: Alfhild
- Successor: Signe
- Consort: Gram
- Issue: daughter Guthorm
- Father: Sigtryg
- Religion: Pagan

In Norse mythology, Gróa (possibly from Old Norse "growing") is a völva (seeress) and practitioner of seiðr. She is the wife of Aurvandil the Bold.

== Attestations ==
=== Prose Edda ===
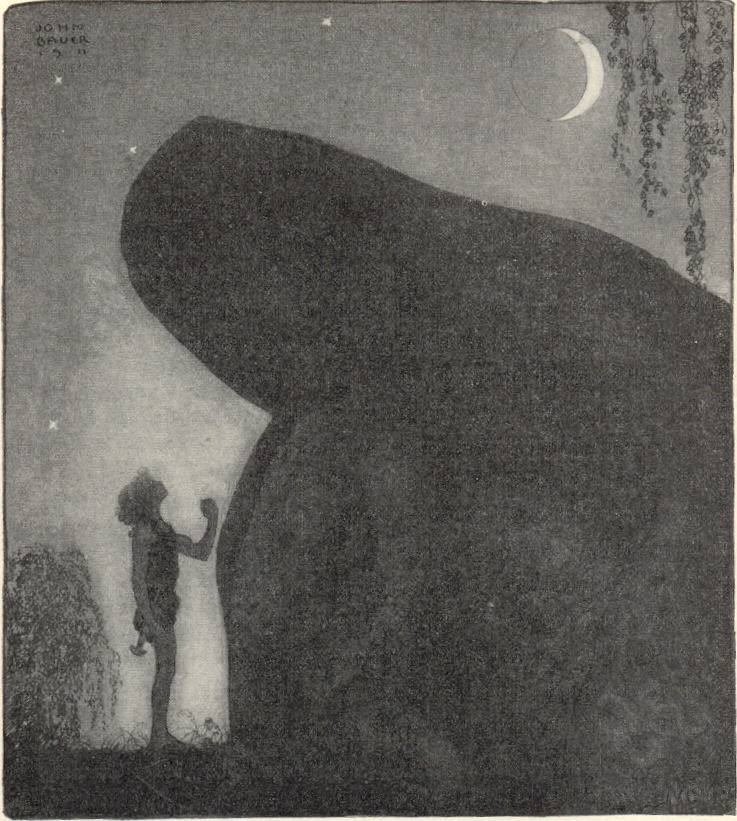
"Awake Groa Awake Mother" Illustration by John Bauer

Gróa appears in the Prose Edda book Skáldskaparmál, in the context of Thor's battle with the jötunn Hrungnir. After Thor has dispatched Hrungnir with the hammer Mjollnir, Gróa is asked to help magically remove shards of Hrungnir's whetstone which became embedded in Thor's head. Unfortunately while Gróa was about her work, Thor distracted her by telling her of how he had earlier helped Aurvandil cross the river Élivágar, and had saved her husband's life by snapping off his frost-bitten toe. Gróa's spell miscarried and the pieces of whetstone remained permanently embedded in Thor's head.

=== Poetic Edda ===
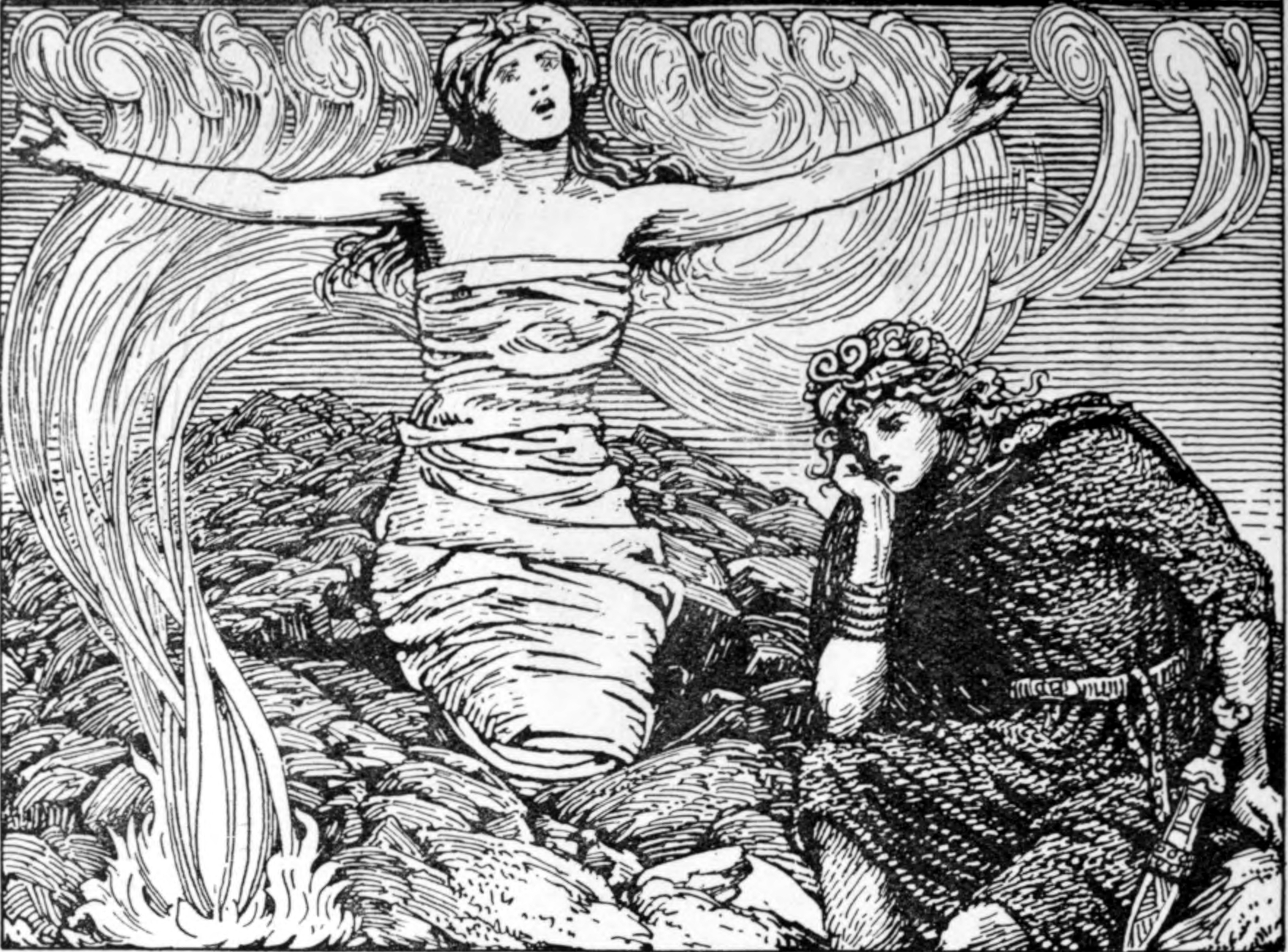
"Groa's Incantation" (1908) by W. G. Collingwood.

Gróa is also a völva (or seeress), summoned from beyond the grave, in the Old Norse poem Grógaldr, (a section of Svipdagsmál), by her son Svipdagr. In death she has lost none of her prophetic powers, and is able to assist him in a successful conclusion of the task which he has been set by his cruel stepmother. It is possible that this second Gróa is the same as the first one, but the poem is a late 17th-century imitation of the Edda. The interaction between Groa and her son Svipdag also offers insight into how necromantic practices were carried out. We see Svipdag waking his mother at the door of her burial mound by calling her name. Because Svipdag merely calls out his mother’s name and beseeches her for help, it appears as though the magic is not in the words themselves but that he spoke them at the entrance of her grave mound. Groa’s skill as a volva is apparent when she speaks nine magical charms over Svipdag to help him survive the ordeal his stepmother has set before him. They include one that calms storms at sea, one that blunts the edges of his enemies' weapons, and one that frees him from fetters if he breathes on the restraints.

=== Gesta Danorum ===
In Gesta Danorum, Gro is a woman saved from marrying a giant by King Gram. She is the daughter of Sigtrygg, King of Sweden, and the mother of Guthorm (and possibly Guthorm's sister) by Gram.

In Viktor Rydberg's elaborate theories on Norse mythology, this Gro is identified with the seeress described in other sources.

The family tree of legendary Kings of the Danes, according to the Gesta Danorum (Books 1 to 9)

Kings of the Danes are marked with a crown (♕). Kings of the Swedes are marked with a dagger (†). Superscript numbers after a name indicate in which books of Gesta Danorum the individual is mentioned.

Humblus ♂ ^{(1)}
KEY
Angul ♂ ^{(1)}	♕ Dan I ♂ ^{(1)}	Grytha ♀ ^{(1)}	Marriage or coupling
Parent and child
The Angles	♕ Humblus ♂ ^{(1)}	♕ Lotherus ♂ ^{(1)}	King of the Saxons ♂ ^{(1)}	Succession by other or unclear means
Roarus ♂ ^{(1)}
Sigtrugus, King of the Swedes† ♂ ^{(1)}	♕ Skioldus ♂ ^{(1)}	Alvilda ♀ ^{(1)}
daughter of Roarus ♀ ^{(1)}	Bessus ♂ ^{(1)}
sister of Gram ♀ ^{(1)}	Gro ♀ ^{(1)}	♕ Gram† ♂ ^{(1)}	Sumblus, King of the Finns ♂ ^{(1)}
Wagnofthus ♂ ^{(1)}
Signe ♀ ^{(1)}	Henricus, King of the Saxons ♂ ^{(1)}	Haquinus, King of the Nitherians ♂ ^{(1)}
Harthgrepa ♀ ^{(1)}
♕Suibdagerus, King of Norway† ♂ ^{(1)}	sister of Guthormus ♀ ^{(1)}	♕Guthormus ♂ ^{(1)}	♕Hadingus ♂ ^{(1,2,4,5)}	Regnilda ♀ ^{(1)}
Asmundus† ♂ ^{(1)}	Gunnilda ♀ ^{(1)}	Guthormus ♂ ^{(1)}
Ulvilda ♀ ^{(1,2)}	♕ Ubbo ♂ ^{(2)}
Henricus ♂ ^{(1)}	Uffo† ♂ ^{(1)}	Hundingus† ♂ ^{(1,2)}	Thorilda ♀ ^{(2)}	Scottus ♂ ^{(2)}
daughter of Uffo ♀ ^{(1)}	Regnerus† ♂ ^{(2)}	Suanhuita ♀ ^{(2)}	sisters of Suanhuita ♀♀ ^{(2)}	Andwan, King of the Hellespont ♂ ^{(2)}
Thoraldus ♂ ^{(2)}
♕ Frotho I ♂ ^{(2,5)}	daughter of Andwan ♀ ^{(2)}
Hothbrodus† ♂ ^{(2,3)}	♕ Haldanus I ♂ ^{(2)}	Roe ♂ ^{(2)}	Skato ♂ ^{(2)}
Thora ♀ ^{(2)}
♕ Helgo ♂ ^{(2,3)}	♕ Roe ♂ ^{(2)}
Athislus† ♂ ^{(2,3)}	Ursa ♀ ^{(2)}
King Gevarus ♂ ^{(2,3)}	♕ Rolvo Krake† ♂ ^{(2,3)}	Ruta ♀ ^{(2)}	Biarco ♂ ^{(2)}	Sculda ♀ ^{(2)}	♕Hiarwarthus † ♂ ^{(2,3)}
♕ Hotherus† ♂ ^{(2,3)}	Nanna ♀ ^{(3)}	Herlecus ♂ ^{(3)}	Gericus ♂ ^{(3)}
former King of Britain ♂ ^{(3)}	mother of the King of Britain ♀ ^{(3)}	a slave ♂ ^{(3)}	a bondmaid ♀ ^{(3)}	♕ Roricus Slyngebond ♂ ^{(3)}	Gerwendillus ♂ ^{(3)}
King of Britain ♂ ^{(3,4)}	Queen of Britain ♀ ^{(3,4)}	Gerutha ♀ ^{(3,4)}	Horwendillus ♂ ^{(3,4)}	Fengo ♂ ^{(3,4)}
foster sister of Amlethus ♀ ^{(3,4)}	daughter of the King of Britain ♀ ^{(3,4)}	Amlethus ♂ ^{(3,4)}	Herminthruda, Queen of Scotland ♀ ^{(4)}	♕ Wiglecus ♂ ^{(4)}
son of Amlethus ♂ ^{(4)}	♕Wermundus ♂ ^{(4)}	Frowinus, governor of Sleswik ♂ ^{(4)}
♕ Uffo, or Olavus the Gentle ♂ ^{(4)}	daughter of Frowin ♀ ^{(4)}	Keto ♂ ^{(4)}	Wigo ♂ ^{(4)}
♕ Dan II ♂ ^{(4)}
♕ Huglecus ♂ ^{(4)}
♕ Frotho II, the Vigorous ♂ ^{(4)}
♕ Dan III ♂ ^{(4)}
Craca ♀ ^{(5)}	Regnerus ♂ ^{(5)}	Bracus ♂ ^{(5)}	♕ Fridlevus I, the Swift ♂ ^{(4,5)}	Hun, King of the Huns ♂ ^{(5)}	Hun ♂ ^{(5)}
Gøtarus, King of Norway ♂ ^{(5)}	Westmarus ♂ ^{(5)}	Colo ♂ ^{(5)}	Gøtwara ♀ ^{(5)}
Rollerus ♂ ^{(5)}	Ericus the Shrewd-spoken† ♂ ^{(5,6)}	Gunwara the Fair ♀ ^{(5)}	Alvilda ♀ ^{(5)}	♕ Frotho III ♂ ^{(5,6)}	Hanunda ♀ ^{(5)}	Grep (eldest of three) ♂ ^{(5)}	11 other sons (two named Grep) ♂♂ ^{(5)}
Hythin, King of Tellemark ♂ ^{(6)}	Alvo ♂ ^{(5)}	Ofura ♀ ^{(5)}	Arngrimus ♂ ^{(5)}	Grubbus ♂ ^{(6)}	♕ Hiarnus ♂ ^{(6)}	Amundus, King of Norway ♂ ^{(6)}
child of Hythin ^{(6)}	Haldanus† ♂ ^{(6)}	12 sons, including Angantir ♂♂ ^{(5)}	Ano ♂ ^{(6)}	Iuritha ♀ ^{(6)}	♕ Fridlevus II ♂ ^{(6)}	Frogertha ♀ ^{(6)}
Hanevus, King of Saxony ♂ ^{(6)}	Suertingus, King of Saxony ♂ ^{(6)}	Olavus ♂ ^{(6)}	♕ Frotho IV ♂ ^{(6)}
Sywardus† ♂ ^{(6,7)}	sons of Suertingus ♂♂ ^{(6)}	sister of the sons of Suertingus ♀ ^{(6)}	♕ Ingellus ♂ ^{(6,7)}	Helga ♀ ^{(6)}	Helgo ♂ ^{(6)}	Asa ♀ ^{(6)}
three sons that died in war ♂♂ ^{(7)}	♕ Olavus I ♂ ^{(7)}	Karolus, governor of Gothland ♂ ^{(7)}
Ulvilda ♀ ^{(7)}	♕ Frotho V ♂ ^{(7)}	Hatherus ♂ ^{(7)}	♕ Haraldus I ♂ ^{(7)}	Sygne ♀ ^{(7)}
Ericus† ♂ ^{(7)}	Thorhilda ♀ ^{(7)}	♕ Haldanus II Biargrammus† ♂ ^{(7)}	♕Haraldus II ♂ ^{(7)}
Ebbo ♂ ^{(7)}	mother of Otharus ♀ ^{(7)}	♕ Unguinus, King of the Goths ♂ ^{(7)}	Asmundus ♂ ^{(7)}
sister of Otharus ♀ ^{(7)}	♕ Sywaldus I ♂ ^{(7)}	Sygrutha ♀ ^{(7)}	Kings of Norway
Sywardus, King of the Goths ♂ ^{(7)}	mother of Alvilda ♀ ^{(7)}	Otharus ♂ ^{(7)}	Syritha ♀ ^{(7)}	♕ Sygarus ♂ ^{(7)}	queen of Sygarus ♀ ^{(7)}	Hamundus, a petty king ♂ ^{(7)}
Wemundus ♂ ^{(7)}	Ostenus ♂ ^{(7)}	♕Sywaldus II ♂ ^{(7)}	Algerus ♂ ^{(7)}	Helwin ♂ ^{(7)}	Hamundus ♂ ^{(7)}
Regnaldus, King of the Northmen ♂ ^{(7)}	Alvilda ♀ ^{(7)}	Alf ♂ ^{(7)}	Sygne ♂ ^{(7)}	Hagbarthus ♂ ^{(7)}	Hako ♂ ^{(7)}
Gro ♀ ^{(7)}	Borcarus ♂ ^{(7)}	Drota ♀ ^{(7)}	Gunnarus ♂ ^{(7)}	Hano, ruler of Funen ♂ ^{(7)}	Ostmarus, ruler of Scania ♂ ^{(7)}	Hundingus, ruler of Zealand ♂ ^{(7)}	Roricus, co-ruler of Jutland ♂ ^{(7)}	Hatherus, co-ruler of Jutland ♂ ^{(7)}
Haraldus ♂ ^{(7)}	Hildigerus ♂ ^{(7)}	Røtho, a Ruthenian pirate ♂ ^{(7)}	Wesetus ♂
♕Haldanus III ♂ ^{(7)}	Guritha ♀ ^{(7)}
Alverus† ♂ ^{(7,8)}	♕ Haraldus III Hyldetan ♂ ^{(7)}
Olavus ♂ ^{(7)}	Ingo ♂ ^{(7)}	Ingeldus† ♂ ^{(7)}	sister of Haraldus ♀ ^{(7)}	Ubbo ♂ ^{(7)}	sister of Haraldus ♀ ^{(7)}	Sywardus ♂ ^{(7)}	sister of Haraldus ♀ ^{(7)}	Olavus, king of the Werms ♂ ^{(7)}
♕ Ringo I† ♂ ^{(7,8)}	♕ Hetha ♀ ^{(8)}	♕ Olo the Vigorous ♂ ^{(7,8)}	Esa ♀ ^{(7)}	son of the king ♂ ^{(7,8)}
Atylo the Scanian ♂ ^{(8)}	Ringo, ruler of Norway ♂ ^{(8)}
Tola ♂ ^{(8)}	Omothus, or Homothus ♂ ^{(8)}	daughter of Ringo ♀ ^{(8)}	Esa ♀ ^{(8)}	♕ Omundus ♂ ^{(7,8)}
Sibbo ♂ ^{(8)}	sister of Gøtarus ♀ ^{(8)}	Gøtarus† ♂ ^{(8)}	daughter of Omundus ♀ ^{(8)}	♕ Sywardus I ♂ ^{(8)}	♕ Buthlus ♂ ^{(8)}	daughter of Omundus ♀ ^{(8)}
Ebbo ♂ ^{(8)}
early wife of Iarmericus ♀ ^{(8)}	♕Iarmericus † ♂ ^{(8)}	Suanilda ♀ ^{(8)}	the Hellepontines, 4 brothers ♂♂ ^{(8)}	Iarmericus' sister, sold to Norwegians ♀ ^{(8)}	Iarmericus' sister, sold to Germans ♀ ^{(8)}
♕ Broderus ♂ ^{(8)}	nephews of Iarmericus ♂♂ ^{(8)}
King of the Goths ♂ ^{(8)}	♕ Sywaldus III ♂ ^{(8)}
King of Sweden† ♂ ^{(8)}	daughter of the King of the Goths ♀ ^{(8)}	♕ Snio ♂ ^{(8)}
♕ Biorn ♂ ^{(8)}
♕ Haraldus III ♂ ^{(8)}
a queen from Sweden ♀ ^{(8)}	♕ Gormo I ♂ ^{(8)}
♕ Gotricus, or Godefridus ♂ ^{(8,9)}
♕ Olavus III ♂ ^{(9)}	daughter of Gotricus ♀ ^{(9)}	Sywardus, King of Norway ♂ ^{(9)}	unknown
♕Hemmingus ♂ ^{(9)}	♕Siwardus II Ring ♂ ^{(9)}	♕ Ringo II ♂ ^{(9)}	Herothus† ♂ ^{(9)}	Hesbernus ♂ ^{(9)}
ruler in Norway ♂ ^{(9)}	Lathgertha ♀ ^{(9)}	♕Regnerus Lothbrog ♂ ^{(9)}	Thora ♀ ^{(9)}
Suanlogha ♀ ^{(9)}	a woman ♀ ^{(9)}
2 daughters ♀♀ ^{(9)}	Fridlevus ♂ ^{(9)}	♕ Haraldus ♂ ^{(9)}	♕ Siwardus & Ericus ♂♂ ^{(9)}	Rathbarthus ♂ ^{(9)}	Dunwatus ♂ ^{(9)}	Ubbo ♂ ^{(9)}
Regnaldus ♂ ^{(9)}	Withsercus ♂ ^{(9)}	Ericus Wind-hat ♂ ^{(9)}	Guthormus ♂ ^{(9)}	♕ Ericus I ♂ ^{(9)}	♕ Sywardus Snake-Eye ♂ ^{(9)}	Biornus ♂ ^{(9)}	Agnerus ♂ ^{(9)}	Ivarus ♂ ^{(9)}
daughter of Guthormus ♀ ^{(9)}	♕ Ericus II ♂ ^{(9)}
♕ Kanutus I ♂ ^{(9)}
♕ Frotho VI ♂ ^{(9)}
♕ Gormo II the English ♂ ^{(9)}
♕ Haraldus V ♂ ^{(9)}	Hedelradus, King of England ♂ ^{(9)}
♕ Gormo III ♂ ^{(9)}	Thira ♀ ^{(9)}
Kanutus ♂ ^{(9)}	Haraldus VI ♂ ^{(9)}

Genealogical information is derived from Oliver Elton's 1905 translation, The First Nine Books of the Danish History of Saxo Grammaticus (via Wikisource). Name spellings are from the 1931 Latin critical edition by Olrik and Ræder (via Wikisource). Regnal numbers, which do not appear in the original text, are included for clarity and taken from the engraving Veræ effigies regum omnium by Erico Olai Tormio.
