= Reginfrid =

Reginfrid (or Ragnfrid) (died 814) was a co-King of Denmark from 812, when Hemming I died, to 813, when he and his brothers were ousted by the sons of a previous king, Gudfred. He was probably a son of Halfdan, a Danish leader who became a vassal of Charlemagne in 807, and brother of Anulo (died 812), Hemming (died 837), and Harald Klak (died c. 852). He was probably also related to the Danish king he succeeded.

On Hemming's death only Reginfrid and Harald were present in Denmark and they had to recall their brother Hemming from Francia. In 813 the sons of Gudfred invaded the kingdom and drove out the three co-rulers. Only Reginfrid tried to regain the kingdom, but was killed in an attempted invasion in 814, as recorded in the Annales regni Francorum.

== Notes ==
Legendary titles
Preceded by Sigfred and Anulo	King of Denmark co-ruled with Harald Klak; 812-813	Succeeded by Horik I
