= Treaty of Heiligen =

811 treaty between Denmark and Charlemagne

The Treaty of Heiligen was a treaty of peace between the Danish King Hemming and the Frankish Emperor Charlemagne. It is attested in the Royal Frankish Annals for the year 811.

The previous King of the Danes, Godofrid, had held a conference with Frankish nobles in 809 beyond the Elbe at Badenfliot, but tension between the Danes and Franks was not resolved. In 810, Godofrid led raids against Frisia and boasted that he wanted to fight Charlemagne in open battle. Before Charlemagne could respond, it was reported that Godofrid had been killed by one of his own retinue. Hemming succeeded Gudfred and offered peace to Charlemagne, but the treaty could not be ratified by exchange of oaths until the following spring, when roads re-opened after a harsh frost. Twelve magnates of each party (twelve from the Danes and twelve from the Franks) met on the River Eider at a place called Heiligen. Gifts were exchanged. The following year, Hemming died and there was a civil war among the Danes.

Some have claimed the treaty established the southern boundary of Denmark at the Eider River, but this appears not to be supported by contemporary sources.

== Sources ==
- Carolingian Chronicles: Royal Frankish Annals and Nithard's Histories. Translated by Scholz, Bernhard Walter; Rogers, Barbara. The University of Michigan Press. 1970. ISBN 0-472-06186-0.
- Thursten, Tina L. (2001). Landscapes of Power, Landscapes of Conflict: State Formation in the South Scandinavian Iron Age. New York: Kluwer Academic. ISBN 0-306-44979-X.
