= Anulo =

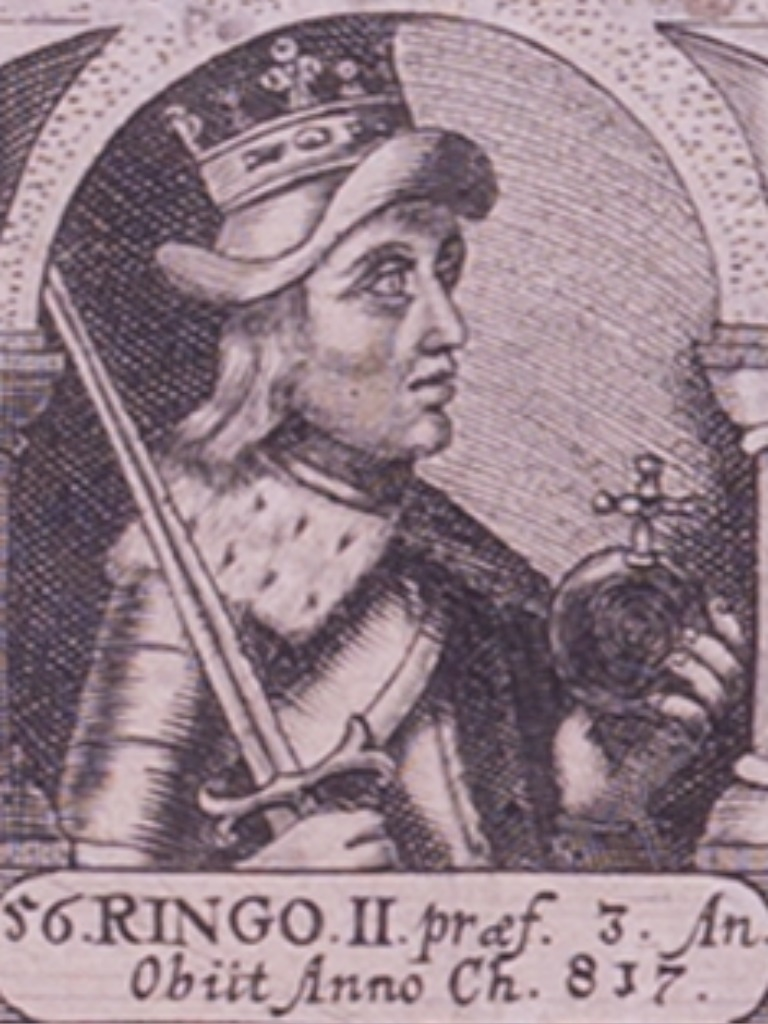
- Anulo as depicted in 1670

King of the Danes
- Reign: 812 (with opposition)
- Predecessor: Hemming
- Successor: Harald Klak and Ragnfred
- Born: Áli; 8th century Denmark
- Died: 812; Denmark
- Dynasty: House of Harald
- Father: probably Halfdan, a brother of Harald
- Religion: Norse paganism

Anulo or Ale was a pretender-king who vied for the Danish throne in 812. He represents the appearance of the House of Harald which competed with the House of Gudfred for power in Denmark until c. 857 and possibly longer.

== The lineage of Harald ==
An early Danish kingdom of some consequence existed in the 8th century, culminating with the warlike exploits of King Gudfred against the Carolingian Empire. As an early dynastic state it was nevertheless fragile and subjected to competition between different royal lineages or branches. Rules of hereditary succession did not exist in this era. Frankish annals document the reigns of Sigfred (c. 770-c. 804) and Gudfred (c. 804–810) who might have been his son. The throne subsequently went to Gudfred's nephew Hemming (810–812). However, there was also another lineage, the earliest known representative of which was King Harald. This Harald may have reigned before Sigfred, although it has also been suggested that he had a brief reign in c. 800. Since some names recur in the two lineages, they were probably related to each other. One of Harald's grandsons or nephews, Hemming (mentioned in 812–813), has been plausibly identified with a Viking king in Frisia, Hemming Halfdansson (d. 837). Thus Harald may have been father or brother of another member of this dynasty called Halfdan who is thought to have been the father of a number of later kings and pretenders: Anulo, Harald Klak, Ragnfred and Hemming. This Halfdan, it has been suggested, could have been the Halfdan who was King Sigfred's envoy to the Franks in 782, and a chief of the same name who submitted to Charlemagne in 807.

== The 812 battle ==
King Hemming, nephew of Gudfred, died in 812 after a short reign. Another nephew of Gudfred, Sigfred, wished to succeed him but was immediately opposed by a prince called Anulo. His unusual name may be compared with the Swedish royal name Onela of the Beowulf epic, and corresponds to Norse Áli (Ale). Anulo was the nephew or grandson (nepos) of King Harald. According to another interpretation of the Latin annal entry (Anulo nepos Herioldi, et ipsius regis), he was the nephew of Harald and the former king, i.e. Hemming. His younger brothers were Harald Klak, Ragnfred and Hemming, which probably makes him the son of Halfdan of 807. In fact, the brothers represented a pro-Carolingian fraction against the House of Gudfred. As they could not agree on a solution, Anulo and Sigfred boded up followers and met in a cataclysmic battle in 812. According to the Frankish annals the struggle cost no less than 10,940 men, making it exceptionally bloody for its time. Anulo as well as Sigfred found their death in the bloodbath, which nevertheless ended with a victory for Anulo's party. His adherents enthroned his brothers Harald Klak and Ragnfred as co-rulers, and the defeated party found it necessary to accept this. The two kings immediately sent envoys to Charlemagne in order to make peace and ask that the fourth brother Hemming should be released. Apparently, Hemming had been left with the emperor as hostage, suggesting some kind of understanding with the Carolingian court. However, the five sons of Gudfred and their followers had sought refuge among the Swedes. In the next year 813 they returned and expelled Harald and Ragnfred. This was the beginning of a long period of rivalry between the Houses of Gudfred and Harald, a rivalry that often entailed Carolingian intervention.

== Anulo becomes Hring ==
The battle between Sigfred and Anulo was briefly and somewhat incorrectly treated in the ecclesiastic chronicle of Adam of Bremen, Gesta Hammaburgensis Ecclesiae Pontificum (c. 1075). The work was widespread in the High Middle Ages and influenced Nordic historiography, directly or indirectly. The unusual name Anulo was misinterpreted as Hring (Latin annulus meaning "ring") while Sigfred was equated with the common medieval name Sigurd. Danish king lists and chronicles such as the Gesta Danorum of Saxo Grammaticus (c. 1200) created the double name Sigurd Hring, a king who sired the renowned Viking ruler Ragnar Lodbrok, who in turn was conflated with Anulo's brother and successor Ragnfred.

Regnal titles
Preceded by Hemming	King of Denmark	Succeeded by Harald Klak and Ragnfred
