= Saint Oscar =

Saint Oscar may refer to:

- Ansgar (801–865), Archbishop of Hamburg-Bremen
- Óscar Romero (1917–1980), Archbishop of San Salvador
