= Halfdansson =

Halfdansson is a Nordic surname that may refer to:

- Eystein Halfdansson (c. 668 – 730)
- Hemming Halfdansson (died 837)
- Harald "Klak" Halfdansson (c. 785 – c. 852)
- Haraldr Hálfdansson (c. 850 – c. 932)
- Sigurd Syr Halfdansson (died 1018)
