= Halfdan (fl. 782–807) =

Danish leader

Halfdan (floruit 782–807) was a leading person among the Danes and the first known Scandinavian to enter Frankish service. Onomastics links him to the Danish royal family since the name "Halfdan" was commonly employed both historically (as attested by the Annales Fuldenses under the year 873) and in the legendary royal lineage.

Halfdan was the envoy sent by King Sigfred to the court of the Frankish emperor Charlemagne in 782, as recorded in the Frankish chronicle Annales regni Francorum. An anonymous Saxon poet praising Charlemagne in Latin epic verse mentions Halfdan's commendation to the emperor in the year 807:

Northmannorum dux, Alfdeni dictus, / Augusto magno sese comitante caterva / Subdidit, atque fidem studuit firmare perennem.	A leader of the Northmen, called Halfdan, submitted to the great Emperor, accompanied by a host of others and strove to keep lasting faith.

Although the Saxon poet wrote much later in the century, his poem is generally based on trustworthy sources like the Annales regni Francorum and this section is probably derived from a now lost earlier source. There is no record of Halfdan after 807 and he probably died not long thereafter, possibly already old at the time. A conversion to Christianity on Halfdan's part is not recorded, nor is a gift of land or a fief, but his son Hemming did convert and was probably ruling Frisia in 837. It is possible that this Frisian fief had been inherited from his father. If the identification of Hemming as a son of Halfdan is correct, then Halfdan was also the father of Anulo, Harald Klak and Reginfrid, all of whom were, for brief periods, co-rulers of Denmark.
