= Hemming Halfdansson =

Hemming Halfdansson (died 837) was "of the Danish race, a most Christian leader". He was probably a son of Halfdan, a leading Dane who became a vassal of Charlemagne in 807. He was probably related to the Danish royal family, as "Hemming" was one of their favoured names. The onomastic evidence includes the Danish king Hemming I (reigned 810–12) and then a Hemming II, who was recalled to Denmark from Francia by his brothers Harald Klak and Reginfrid after Hemming I's death. This Hemming was probably the same person as Hemming Halfdansson. He probably soon returned to Francia, since there is no evidence of him in Danish politics after he and his brothers were driven out by the sons of Godfrid in 813.

It is probable that Hemming was received by the Franks and granted Walcheren, a fortress in Frisia, as a benefice. It may have been held earlier by his father, it was certainly granted in 841 to the Danes Harald and Rorik. He, along with its Frankish count, Eccihard, died defending it from a Viking attack in 837. Probably both Eccihard and Hemming were responsible for the defence of Frisia from the Vikings, as a capitulary of 821 refers to "the counts who are responsible for coastal defence". If so, Hemming appears to have been the superior, since Thegan of Trier in his Gesta Hludowici imperatoris, an account of the reign of Louis the Pious, names him first when recording the dead, followed by "another leader, Eccihard, and many of the emperor's nobles". On the other hand, Hemming may have been a courtier sent by the emperor to aid the local leader, Eccihard.
