= Horik II =

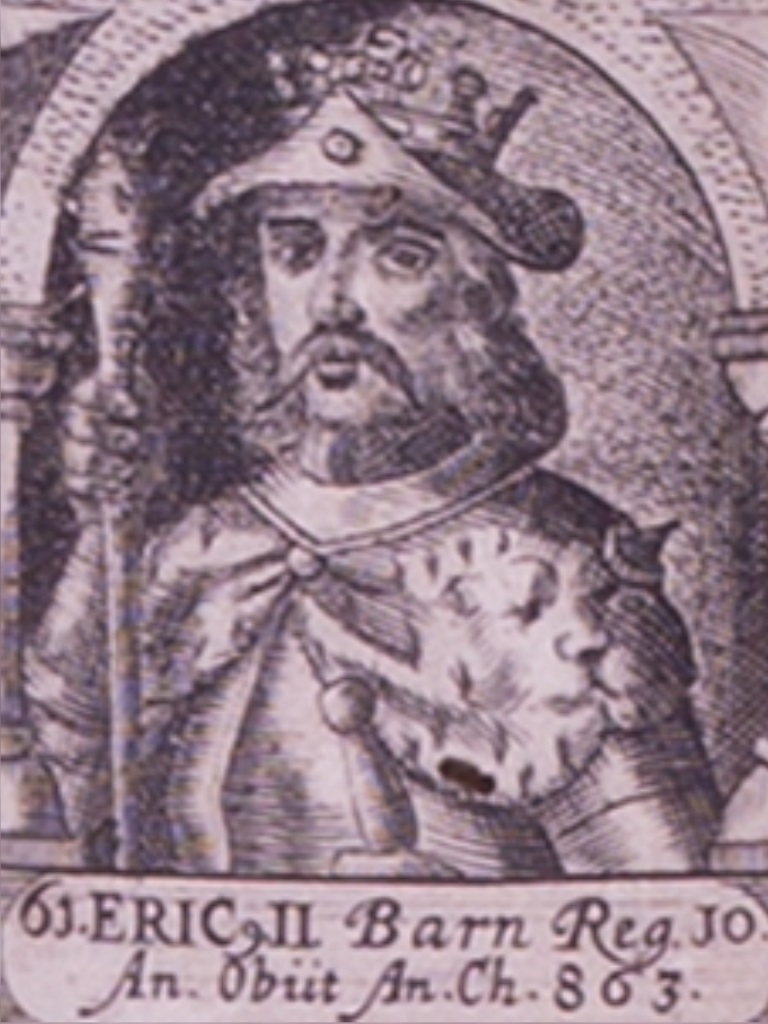
- Horik II as depicted in 1670

King of the Danes
- Reign: 854 – c. 870
- Predecessor: Horik I
- Successor: Bagsecg
- Born: Hárikr; 9th century Denmark
- Died: c. 870; Denmark?
- Dynasty: Sigfredian
- Father: unknown, perhaps a son of Horik I
- Religion: Norse paganism

Horik II (died after 864), also known as Hårik or, in late sources, Erik Barn (Danish: "Erik the Child"), was King of the Danes from the fall of Horik I in 854 to an unknown date between 864 and 873. During his reign the Danish kingdom showed tendencies of breaking up. After his demise under unknown circumstances, Denmark entered a long period of obscurity, until the rise of the Jelling dynasty in the 10th century.

== Political crisis and ascent ==
His predecessor Horik I had a long reign of more than 40 years. By the mid 9th century he was old by the standards of the time, and younger relatives began to create trouble. One of them, Guttorm, attacked Horik in 854. In the brief civil war that followed, the branches of the royal family were nearly wiped out. The Frankish Fulda Annals and the Vita Ansgari make clear that only a single royal child was left alive, also called Horik (Old Norse, Hárikr). In later historiography he is hence known as Erik the Child. The problem with the story is that at the time there was no hereditary kingship. Kings were literally shouted into office at the assemblies (Danish: landsting) by the chiefs and peasants who supported him. Moreover, there still relatives of the former king Harald Klak alive. Judging from the Frankish sources, the power center of the dynasty lay in extreme southern Denmark, including Hedeby, and Horik II emerged as the strongest of the claimants although young. Little is known about him except for stray references in various Frankish annals and The Life of Ansgar by Rimbert.

Horik II was probably not the son of Horik I, but a close relative, perhaps a nephew or grandson of the old king. At any rate he belonged to the powerful House of Gudfred which held power in much of Denmark. Sons were not usually named after fathers in Viking Age Denmark.

== Struggle for South Jutland ==
The old Horik I had been friendly disposed to Ansgar, Archbishop of Hamburg-Bremen, and allowed the construction of a church in Hedeby. However, the violent showdown in 854 cost the lives of the Danish grandees who had been favourable to the archbishop. Some people blamed the recent disasters on the intrusion of the new faith. After his accession, Horik II followed the advice of the anti-Christian Hovi Jarl and closed the Hedeby church, expelling its priest. However, political developments soon changed the conditions for missionary work. Already in 855 two claimants arrived from their base in Frisia. They were Rørik and Gudfred, nephew and son of the former king Harald Klak, who were probably distant relatives of the Gudfred clan. They therefore had a claim to power as valid as Horik's. At the time Rørik was attempting to carve out a Frisian kingdom between the Saxons and the Danes with the help of the Carolingian rulers Lothair I and later Lothair II. The two Viking princes demanded part of the Danish realm but were turned away.

Rørik nevertheless came back in 857, using the authority of Lothair II of Lotharingia to intimidate Horik. As it turned out the young king had to give up his lands in South Jutland between the Eider River and the North Sea. This may have included Hedeby at the Schlei, an inlet of the Baltic Sea, where Hovi Jarl probably supported Rørik. The possession of Hedeby would have secured considerable toll incomes, as it was one of the most important commercial centers of Viking Age Scandinavia. It would have been in Lothair II's interest to use the port to increase trade between Lotharingia and Scandinavia. However, the plans were cut short by a new incident, since Rørik's Frisian port Dorestad was ravaged by other Vikings while he was absent. Rørik soon had to leave his Danish kingdom for Frisia, and his possessions apparently reverted to Horik. Circumstances thus prevented a thinly veiled attempt to add southern Denmark to the Carolingians.

== Missionary recovery ==
Now Hovi Jarl was expelled from Hedeby by Horik, who opened friendly relations with the East Frankish kingdom, as his predecessor Horik I had done before him. The king, although not a Christian, turned increasingly tolerant of the Christians among his people and of the missionaries from the Archdiocese of Hamburg-Bremen who found their way north. Horik was guided by a relative called Burghard who had also been influential during Horik I's reign and was well disposed to Ansgar. According to the polished account of Rimbert, the young ruler appreciated Ansgar as a good and upright ally. He was persuaded by Ansgar to reopen the ruined church and donated land for a new church at Ribe. It is sometimes alleged that the king gave permission for a third Danish church to be built in Århus during the time of Bishop Rimbert, Ansgar's successor, in 866. However, Århus is only mentioned in the actual sources in 948. Horik even allowed the Christians in Hedeby to ring church bells for the first time, much to the disgust of the non-Christians who believed the bells would frighten off the land spirits (Danish: landvætter) and ruin the harvest. In 864 Pope Nicholas I received gifts from Horik via the East Frankish king. The Pope wrote that Horik had made a promise to God and Saint Peter and hoped he would continue in the steps of Cornelius the Centurion (one of the first gentile converts to the teachings of Christ). In a letter to Horik he encouraged him to accept baptism and abstain from worshiping wooden idols. There is no evidence that he was actually converted, however.

== End of the reign ==
During Horik's reign, Vikings raided England in 855 and 860 with varying success. The Great Heathen Army arrived to East Anglia in 865 and conquered York in Northumbria two years later, starting the Viking conquest and colonization of much of northeast England. While they are expressly called Danes in the Anglo-Saxon Chronicle, the army appears to have been formed by Vikings operating in Francia and Frisia. Whether the royal power in Denmark had part in the planning and organization is unknown. Later sagas assert that this was the case, depicting the leaders of the invasion as sons of the Danish king Ragnar Lodbrok. However, no such king is known in the contemporary sources. The invasion leaders Halfdan and Bagsecg were known as "kings" and may or may not have been related to the kings in the Danish homeland.

Horik II is not mentioned after 864. In 873 the Franks entertained diplomatic contacts with the kings Sigfred and his brother Halfdan. Nothing in particular is known about them, but for chronological reasons they were probably not sons of Horik II. According to Rory McTurk, Halfdan may be identified with the Halfdan of the Great Heathen Army, while Sigfred might have been the prototype for the legendary Sigurd Snake-in-the-Eye, son of Lodbrok and king in Denmark according to the later sagas. A Christian Dane called Sigfred, nephew of "Heoric the Dane" (presumably Horik II) is mentioned in West Francia in 884.

== Later accounts ==
Horik II was known to the 11th century chronicler Adam of Bremen. Through his influential church history, the ruler occurs in some medieval Scandinavian texts, his name being misinterpreted as "Erik". Saxo Grammaticus (c. 1200) makes Erik the Child a son of Sigurd Snake-in-the-Eye and thus grandson of Ragnar Lodbrok. According to Saxo he developed into a Viking raider on the lines of his grandfather, but eventually accepted Christianity through the influence of Ansgar. He married a daughter of Guttorm (the nemesis of Horik I) and sired a son called Canute, ancestor of the later kings. Snorri Sturluson (c. 1230) mentions King Erik of Jutland whose daughter Ragnhild married Harald Fairhair and gave birth to Eric Bloodaxe.

Regnal titles
Preceded by Horik I	King of Denmark	Succeeded by Sigfred and Halfdan
