= Ansgar =

Christian saint, Archbishop, and missionary

Saint Ansgar
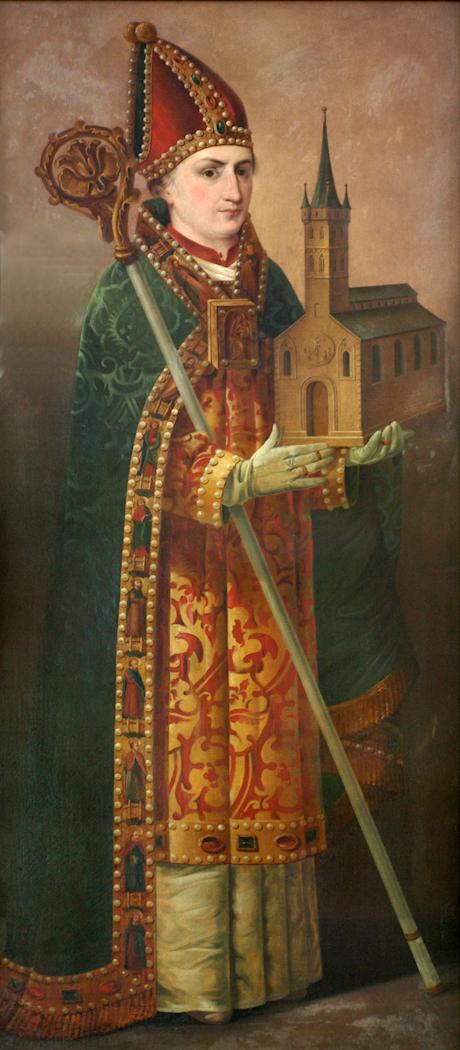
- A depiction of Saint Ansgar by Siegfried Bendixen from the Church Trinitatis, in Hamburg, Germany

Apostle of the North
- Born: 8 September 801; Corbie, Frankish Kingdom
- Died: 3 February 865 (aged 63); Bremen, East Francia
- Venerated in: Catholic Church; Eastern Orthodox Church; Anglican Communion; Lutheranism
- Feast: 3 February
- Attributes: Dressed in archbishop's attire with a model of the church
- Patronage: Scandinavia, Missionaries

Ansgar (8 September 801 – 3 February 865), also known as Anskar, Saint Ansgar, Saint Anschar or Oscar, was Archbishop of Hamburg-Bremen in the northern part of the Kingdom of the East Franks. Ansgar became known as the "Apostle of the North" because of his travels and the See of Hamburg received the missionary mandate to bring Christianity to Northern Europe.

== Life ==
Ansgar was the son of a noble Frankish family, born near Amiens (present-day France). After his mother's early death, Ansgar was brought up in Benedictine monastery of Corbie in Picardy. According to the Vita Ansgarii ("Life of Ansgar"), when the little boy learned in a vision that his mother was in the company of Mary, mother of Jesus, his careless attitude toward spiritual matters changed to seriousness. His pupil, successor, and eventual biographer Rimbert considered the visions (of which this was the first) to have been Ansgar's main life motivator.

Ansgar acted in the context of the phase of Christianization of Saxony (present day Northern Germany) begun by Charlemagne and continued by Charlemagne's son and successor, Louis the Pious. In 822, Ansgar became one of many missionaries sent to found the abbey of Corvey (New Corbie) in Westphalia, where he became a teacher and preacher. A group of monks, including Ansgar, were sent further north to Jutland with the king Harald Klak, who had received baptism during his exile. With Harald's downfall in 827 and Ansgar's companion Autbert having died, their school for the sons of courtiers closed, and Ansgar returned to Germany. Then in 829, after the Swedish king Björn at Hauge requested missionaries for his Swedes, King Louis sent Ansgar, now accompanied by friar Witmar from New Corbie as his assistant. Ansgar preached and made converts, particularly during six months at Birka, on Lake Mälaren, where the wealthy widow Mor Frideborg extended hospitality. Ansgar organized a small congregation with her and the king's steward, Hergeir, as its most prominent members.

In 831, Ansgar returned to Louis' court at Worms and was appointed to the Archbishopric of Hamburg-Bremen. This was a new archbishopric, incorporating the bishoprics of Bremen and Verden and with the right to send missions into all the northern lands, as well as to consecrate bishops for them. Ansgar received the mission of evangelizing pagan Denmark, Norway and Sweden. The King of Sweden decided to cast lots as to whether to admit the Christian missionaries into his kingdom. Ansgar recommended the issue to the care of God, and the lot was favourable. Ansgar was consecrated as a bishop in November 831, with the approval of Gregory IV. Before travelling north once again, Ansgar travelled to Rome to receive the pallium directly from the pope's hands, and was formally named legate for the northern lands. Ebbo, Archbishop of Reims had previously received a similar commission, but was deposed twice before his death in 851, and never actually traveled so far north, so the jurisdiction was divided by agreement, with Ebbo retaining Sweden for himself. For a time Ansgar devoted himself to the needs of his own diocese, which was still a missionary territory and had few churches. He founded a monastery and a school in Hamburg. Although intended to serve the Danish mission further north, it accomplished little.

After Louis the Pious died in 840, his empire was divided and Ansgar lost the abbey of Turholt, which Louis had given to endow Ansgar's work. Then in 845, the Danes unexpectedly raided Hamburg, destroying all the church's treasures and books. Ansgar now had neither see nor revenue, and many helpers deserted him. The new king, Louis' third son, Louis the German, did not re-endow Turholt to Ansgar, but in 847 he named the missionary to the vacant diocese of Bremen, where Ansgar moved in 848. However, since Bremen had been suffragan to the Bishop of Cologne, combining the sees of Bremen and Hamburg presented canonical difficulties. After prolonged negotiations, Pope Nicholas I approved the union of the two dioceses in 864.

Through this political turmoil, Ansgar continued his northern mission. The Danish civil war compelled him to establish good relations with two kings, Horik the Elder and his son, Horik II. Both assisted him until his death; Ansgar was able to secure permission to build a church in Sleswick north of Hamburg and recognition of Christianity as a tolerated religion. Ansgar did not forget the Swedish mission, and spent two years there in person (848–850), averting a threatened pagan reaction. In 854, Ansgar returned to Sweden when king Olof ruled in Birka. According to Rimbert, he was well disposed to Christianity. On a Viking raid to Grobiņa and Apuole (current village in Lithuania) in Courland, the Swedes plundered the Curonians.

== Death and legacy ==
Ansgar was buried in Bremen in 865. His successor as archbishop, Rimbert, wrote the Vita Ansgarii. He noted that Ansgar wore a rough hair shirt, lived on bread and water, and showed great charity to the poor. Adam of Bremen attributed the Vita et miracula of Willehad (first bishop of Bremen) to Ansgar in Gesta Hammenburgensis ecclesiæ; Ansgar is also the reputed author of a collection of brief prayers Pigmenta (ed. J. M. Lappenberg, Hamburg, 1844). Pope Nicholas I declared Ansgar a saint shortly after the missionary's death. The first actual missionary in Sweden and the Nordic countries (and organizer of the Catholic church therein), Ansgar was later declared "Patron of Scandinavia".

Relics are located in Hamburg in two places: St. Mary's Cathedral (Ger.: Domkirche St. Marien) and St. Ansgar's and St. Bernard's Church (Ger.: St. Ansgar und St. Bernhard Kirche). Statues of Bishop Ansgar stand in Hamburg, Copenhagen and Ribe, as well as a stone cross at Birka. His feast day (Lesser Festival) is 3 February, as it is in the Church of England, the Episcopal Church, and the Evangelical Lutheran Church in America.

The lunar crater Ansgarius is named after him.

== Visions ==
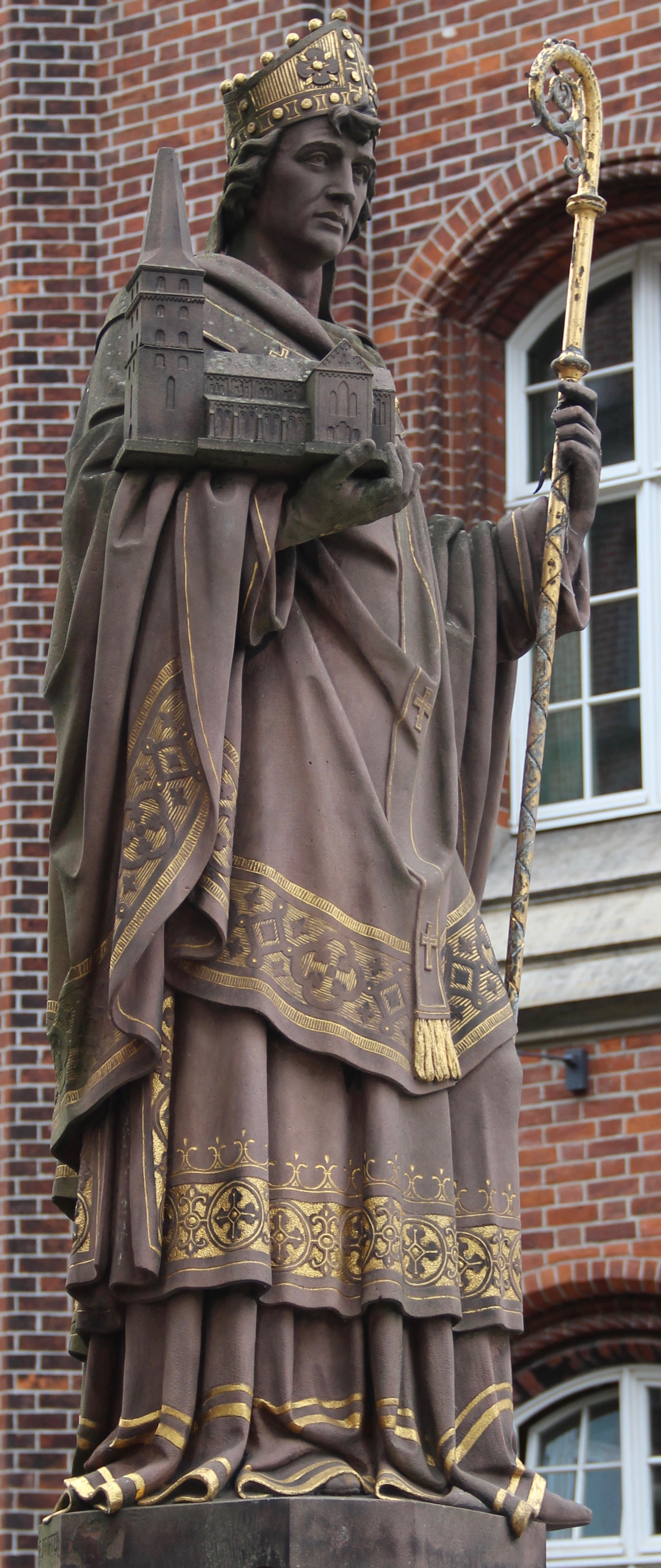
Saint Ansgar statue in Hamburg

Although a historical document and primary source written by a man whose existence can be proven historically, the Vita Ansgarii ("The Life of Ansgar") aims above all to demonstrate Ansgar's sanctity. It is partly concerned with Ansgar's visions, which, according to the author Rimbert, encouraged and assisted Ansgar's remarkable missionary feats.

Through the course of this work, Ansgar repeatedly embarks on a new stage in his career following a vision. According to Rimbert, his early studies and ensuing devotion to the ascetic life of a monk were inspired by a vision of his mother in the presence of Mary, mother of Jesus. Again, when the Swedish people were left without a priest for some time, he begged King Horik to help him with this problem; then after receiving his consent, consulted with Bishop Gautbert to find a suitable man. The two together sought the approval of King Louis, which he granted when he learned that they were in agreement on the issue. Ansgar was convinced he was commanded by heaven to undertake this mission and was influenced by a vision he received when he was concerned about the journey, in which he met a man who reassured him of his purpose and informed him of a prophet that he would meet, the abbot Adalhard, who would instruct him in what was to happen. In the vision, he searched for and found Adalhard, who quoted to him "Islands, listen to me, pay attention, remotest peoples" (Isaiah 49:1). Ansgar interpreted this as showing God's will that he go to the Scandinavian countries as "most of that country consisted of islands, especially when Adalhard added "I will make you the light of the nations so that my salvation may reach to the ends of the earth" (Isaiah 49:6), since the end of the world in the north was in Swedish territory.

== See also ==
- List of Eastern Orthodox saints
- Calendar of saints (Episcopal Church)
- Hochkirchlicher Apostolat St. Ansgar
- Priory of St. Ansgar
- Sankt-Ansgar-Schule
- Vita Ansgarii

Ansgar Born: 8 September 801 in Amiens or 796 in Corbie Died: 3 February 865 in Bremen
Catholic Church titles
New diocese	Archbishop of Hamburg; 834–865	Succeeded by Rimbert
Preceded by Leuderich	Bishop of Bremen; 848–865	Succeeded by Rimbert
