= Ongendus =

King of the Danes
- Reign: c. 710 – 738
- Successor: Unknown, possibly Harald Wartooth
- Born: 7th century Denmark (presumed)
- Died: 8th century Denmark (presumed)
- Issue: ?
- Dynasty: ?
- Religion: Norse paganism

Ungendus (sometimes written as Ongendus) is mentioned in Alcuin’s (735–804) *Vita sancti Willibrordi* in the context of a missionary expedition to the west coast of Denmark undertaken around 710 by Willibrord, Archbishop of Utrecht. Willibrord received thirty boys as a gift from this Ungendus, who were intended for monastic training in the realm of the Merovingian Mayor of the palace Pepin of Herstal. Ungendus is not a name, it means ‘one to be anointed’ (Latin). The ruler, whose name is unknown, thus held the rank of a king, but lacked the anointing of a Christian king. No further details are given about Ongendus, other than that he was "more savage than any beast and harder than stone". Against Willibrord's account, however, one should also consider that he was apparently well received, could travel in peace through Ungendus' realm and was allowed to return with his potential disciples, so the savagery of Ungendus may well be overstated. It may just have been the obligatory classification of any heathen ruler. He have reigned in Denmark at the time of the construction of the Kanhave Canal in 726 AD and initiated the first major expansion of the [Danevirke] around 710/720.

== Literal knowledge ==
About 710, Saint Willibrord visited the Danes whilst Ungendus was ruling and returned with 30 boys to instruct in missionary work. — the ideal of man in the Viking Age.

== See also ==
- List of legendary kings of Denmark
