= Horik I =

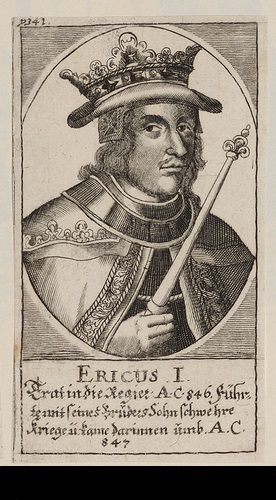
- Horik I - 17th century engraving

King of the Danes
- Reign: 813 – 854
- Predecessor: Harald Klak and Ragnfred
- Successor: Horik II
- Born: Late 8th century Denmark
- Died: 854; Denmark
- Issue: Horik II?
- Dynasty: Sigfredian
- Father: Gudfred
- Religion: Norse paganism

Horik I or Hårik (died 854) was a king of the Danes. He was co-ruler from 813, and sole king from c. 828 until 850 when he had to accept joint rule with two nephews. He met a violent death in 854. His long and eventful reign was marked by Danish raids on the Carolingian Empire of Louis the Pious, son and successor of Charlemagne.

== Background ==
Horik's father was King Gudfred, known for his successful raids and wars against Charlemagne's Frankish empire and against the Obodrites. If the later author Notker of Saint Gall can be trusted, his mother may have been disowned by Gudfred in the early 9th century. In 810, Gudfred was assassinated by a housecarl, or, in Notker's version, by one of his sons as revenge for the treatment of his mother. His nephew Hemming succeeded him. Gudfred had at least five sons. It is unknown why kingship descended on a side-branch of the dynasty, though Hemming was possibly older than his cousins. The new king made peace with Charlemagne in 811.

Hemming's reign as king was short-lived and he died in 812. After his demise, a violent civil war broke out. Another dynastic branch, Harald Klak and Ragnfred, gained power during the conflict. The party of the five sons of Gudfred, of whom only Horik is known by name. [There has been some speculation about the names of his brothers. P.A. Munch believed that Olaf Geirstad-Alf was a son of Gudfred, whom he identified with Gudrød the Hunter of Vestfold. Henrik Schück assumed that another one was named Ragnar (not to be confused with Ragnar Loðbrok), indicated as the grandfather of Amlaíb Conung in Irish genealogy. Erik Kroman believed that still another brother was Kettil, sometimes said to be the father of Hrolfr the Ganger, better known today as Rollo. If any of these Theories is to be believed, it is also logical to surmize that one of these Brothers, (most likely Ketill) may have been the father of king Guðrum of East Anglia, who is occasionally said to have been a nephew of Horik and a failed candidate for the Danish throne. None of this has found acceptance by later scholarship]. sought refuge with the Swedes during the unrest. Harald and Ragnfred entertained good relations with Charlemagne.

== Becoming king ==
Harald and Ragnfred were busy fighting rebels in Vestfold in Norway, the farthest part of their realm. After their return to Denmark in 813, they were attacked by Gudfred's sons and their noble retainers, who had returned from Sweden. The five brothers found support from all over the Danish realm, defeated Harald and Ragnfred with relative ease, and expelled them from Denmark. In that way the brothers were elevated as Danish co-rulers. Whether they split the realm into parts or ruled collectively is not known. In the next year, Harald and Ragnfred gathered a force and attacked their rivals. A battle was fought where Ragnfred and the oldest son of Gudfred were both slain. However, the remaining four brothers gained victory. Harald acknowledged defeat and fled to the new Frankish Emperor Louis the Pious who had just succeeded his father Charlemagne. Louis ordered him to stay in Saxony and await the right occasion when the Franks would be able to help him regain his throne.

During the winter, Louis ordered the Saxons and Obodrites to prepare for the invasion of Denmark. In May 815 the troops moved northward over the Elbe and reached Sinlendi (in South Jutland). Then they marched for seven days until they reached a shore, three miles from a certain island (possibly Funen). The four brother kings had gathered a fleet of 200 ships and were posted on the island, refusing to offer the imperial troops battle. The imperial envoy Baldrich let his troops ravage the districts in the neighbourhood, took 40 hostages, and returned without having achieved much.

Ex-king Harald did not give up and repeatedly raided the realm of Gudfred's sons from his base in the Frankish Empire. In 817 the sons asked Emperor Louis to make peace in order to halt the attacks. However, the Frankish court considered this mere hypocrisy. On the contrary, Louis continued to support Harald's cause. Next, the Obodrite ruler Slavomir, a vassal of Louis, defected since the emperor forced him to share power with another prince, Keadrag. Instead, Slavomir sent a message to Gudfred's sons and suggested an alliance. In fact, a Danish Viking fleet sailed up the Elbe and laid waste to the Stör area. The Danish border chief Glum attacked the Frankish fortress Esesfeld with a force of Danes and Obodrites, but had to withdraw in the face of spirited Frankish resistance.

== Sharing power with Harald Klak ==
Two years after these events, in 819, the Danish ally Slavomir was arrested by the Franks and deprived of power. Meanwhile, there was a rift among Gudfred's sons. Two of them expelled the other two, supposedly through treason. In a dramatic twist of alliances the remaining king-brothers, one of which was obviously Horik, asked Harald Klak to share power with them. This may have been an expedient way to gain peace with the Franks, now that the Danish interests in the Slavic lands had been weakened. On the emperor's order, the Obodrites took Harald on board their ships and brought him home. The route taken suggests that the center of the Danish kingdom was situated on the islands, perhaps Funen. The Vita Ansgari says that Harald ruled over "part of the land of the Danes", implying that the kingdom was shared up. The new constellation was successful for a few years. However, the sons of Gudfred irritated the emperor by allying with the Obodrite prince Keadrag in a "faithless" way, causing Louis to reinstate Slavomir in his stead.

In 823 the alliance began to break down, as Gudfred's sons threatened to expel Harald from the kingdom. Harald fled to Louis and asked for his assistance. Two imperial envoys visited Denmark and collected detailed information about the situation. On their return, they brought with them Archbishop Ebo of Rheims, who had spent time proselytizing in Denmark with some success. The whereabouts of Harald in the next few years are not recorded, but in 826 he was baptized in Mainz, where the emperor in person acted as his godfather. After the ceremony, Harald was sent back towards Denmark in the company of the missionary Ansgar. As he could not safely enter his kingdom, the emperor provided him with a fief on the other side of Elbe. Gudfred's sons sent envoys to the imperial court in 825 and 826 to renew the peace. Horik, who is now mentioned by name for the first time, promised to appear before Louis at Nijmegen in 827 but broke his promise. Instead, he and his brother expelled Harald from Denmark, this time for good.

== Later career ==
Still in the next year, there were diplomatic negotiations between the Franks and Gudfred's sons. However, the exiled Harald lost patience and unexpectedly attacked Denmark and plundered and burned several villages. Exasperated, Horik and his brother gathered an army, crossed the Eider and attacked the imperial troops in the neighbourhood. The Franks were badly defeated and fled from their encampment. Afterwards the kings sent envoys to Louis in order to avert Frankish retribution. In fact, Horik was not disturbed by direct Frankish intervention during the remainder of his long reign. Though Harald survived as a Frankish protégé until the 840s he was not able to seriously disturb Horik. It is not known exactly when Horik's brother and co-ruler died, but he is not mentioned after 828. The Vita Ansgari states that Horik was the sole ruler when Ansgar became Archbishop of Bremen (849).

By the mid 9th century Horik developed a friendly relation to Ansgar, Archbishop of Hamburg and Bremen. According to the Vita Ansgari the king trusted Ansgar to the degree that the latter was allowed to follow the meetings with his privy council. Ansgar made efforts to convert Horik to Christianity and persuaded him to build a church in Hedeby. When Ansgar planned a missionary expedition to the Swedes in about 852, Horik helped prepare the trip, providing the archbishop with his personal envoy and a message to the Swedish King Olof. The king (or his partisans) had found refuge in Sweden in his youth and may have entertained good relations with part of the Swedish elite. In the end, he nevertheless refused to convert to Christianity, perhaps since it was his enemies' religion.

In spite of his flirtation with the Christian mission towards the end of his life, his reign was filled with Viking activities directed against the Frankish kingdoms, often but not always approved by himself. Danish raids against Frisia were a major problem. The Franks lacked an effective fleet, so the Danes could raid more or less with impunity. The Danes sacked the silver minting center of Dorestad in 834, 835, and 836, and plundered Walcheren in 837. King Horik seems to have disapproved of these raids, for successful raiders constituted possible rivals. Occasionally, Horik even punished raiders. In 836, Horik sent an emissary to Emperor Louis declaring that he had nothing to do with the raids on Frisia, and two years later he assured that he had executed those responsible. In return he asked the emperor to cede the lands of the Frisians and Obodrites, which Louis found highly offensive. Here it seems that Horik reiterated the old pretensions of his father Gudfred.

Danish Viking activity also went in the other direction, to Central Sweden. The expelled Swedish King Anund secured assistance from the Danes in the 840s in order to regain his kingdom, presumably with Horik's approval. The expedition did not achieve much and was soon redirected to the Slavic lands on the southern coast of the Baltic. Another Danish expedition went to Curlandia in about 850 in order to extract tribute. However, it failed badly, and the defeat encouraged Swedish expansion in that direction.

== Raids on Paris and Hamburg ==
After the break-up of the Frankish Empire in 843, Horik temporarily broke off his old conciliatory stance and began open hostilities towards the West and East Franks. In 845 a fleet under one of Horik's chiefs, Ragnar, sailed up the Seine and attacked Paris in the West Frankish Kingdom. Ragnar has sometimes been identified with the legendary Viking Ragnar Lodbrok although this cannot be proven. Paris was sacked and King Charles the Bald was forced to flee, eventually paying Ragnar a sum of 7,000 pounds of silver as ransom. A considerable booty was brought back to Denmark, though many Vikings including Ragnar were later claimed by Frankish sources to have perished in a violent illness. Perhaps the same fleet attacked Hamburg on its way home and destroyed St. Mary's Cathedral there. It was Horik's last major war in East Francia. Soon after he told King Louis the German that he had once again killed some of the most notorious Viking raiders. Still, Frisia was ravaged once again in 846, and in the following year the three Frankish monarchs and brothers, Charles, Louis and Lothair I, agreed to intimidate Horik in order to gain peace. But the disturbances only stopped around 850 when Horik was beset by internal problems.

== Downfall ==
It has been argued that the Viking raids in West Europe weakened rather than strengthened Horik's authority, as he was increasingly unable to control the warrior chiefs. In 850, Horik I and two unnamed nephews (called "nepotes") partitioned the kingdom into thirds, ending the unified kingship. Horik's brother's son Guttorm, who had been driven into exile by Horik, appeared in 854 and claimed the kingdom. A huge battle was fought which lasted for three days. King Horik I "and the other kings" were killed, as were Guttorm and a great many chiefs.

Only one eligible candidate for the kingship remained, a child who was also called Horik and was related to his older namesake. The young man was now appointed king. Nothing is known about any sons of Horik I, but since a child was usually not named after his father, it has been guessed that Horik II was a grandson of Horik I. Horik II disappeared some time between 864 and 873 and was the last known ruler of the Sigfredian dynasty, as Denmark seems to have lost its political cohesion in the late 9th century. It was only in the 10th century that the dynasty of Gorm the Old began to assemble the Danish kingdom again.

== Cultural references ==
The exploits of Horik I were not remembered by later Norse tradition. He is not included in the lists of Danish kings compiled by high medieval Icelandic authors. In his partly fantastic work Gesta Danorum (c. 1200), Saxo Grammaticus speaks of Horik as "Eric" and makes him the brother of Harald Klak, while Horik II (Eric the Child) is depicted as the son of Sigurd Snake-in-the-Eye and grandson of Ragnar Lodbrok. These are, however, arbitrary combinations based on the chronicle of Adam of Bremen (c. 1075).

Horik I appears in the TV series Vikings, seasons 1-2 (2013-2014), portrayed by Donal Logue. In the series, he is killed by Ragnar Lothbrok rather than by his nephew Guttorm.

Regnal titles
Preceded by Harald Klak and Ragnfred	King of Denmark	Succeeded by Horik II
