= Sigfred =

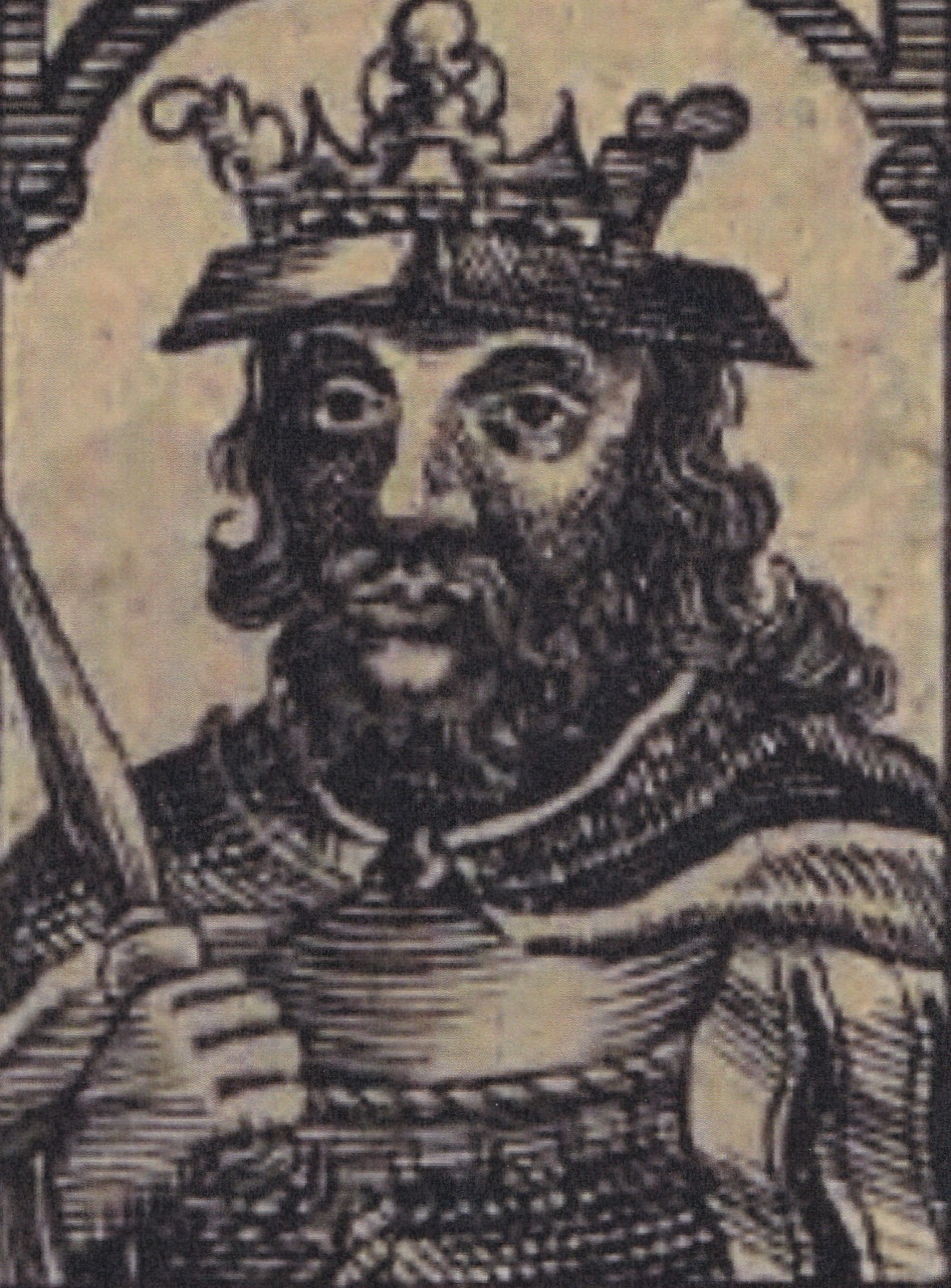
- Sigfred as depicted in 1710

King of the Danes
- Reign: c. 770–c.798/804
- Predecessor: unknown (Harald Wartooth?)
- Successor: Gudfred
- Born: 8th century Denmark
- Died: c.798/804 Denmark
- Dynasty: Sigfredian
- Religion: Norse paganism

Sigfred was an eighth century Danish king who is known to have reigned from before 777 to after 798. Fragments of his reign can be traced via Frankish sources.

== Assistance to Widukind ==
King Sigfred is first mentioned in 777 when the Saxon chief Widukind, leader of the resistance against Charlemagne, fled Saxony in the face of the Frankish onslaught. Widukind found refuge with Sigfred, but the Frankish annals do not say in detail what kind of assistance the Danish king may have provided. At any rate, Charlemagne made no attempt to subordinate or threaten the Danes during his Saxon campaigns. German chronicles, to better espouse the family tree of Widukind's heirs, stated that he was married to Sigfred's daughter Geva.

== Frankish diplomacy ==
In the summer of 782, Charlemagne led his armed forces to the sources of the Lippe River, staying there for some time. On this occasion he received envoys from Sigfred, although the details of the negotiations are not disclosed. Shortly after, Widukind left his Nordic refuge and returned to Saxony where he successfully egged the population to rebel against the Frankish king. He then led the Saxon resistance until 785 when he finally submitted to Charlemagne. For several years, there is no mention of the Danish king, but in 798 Charlemagne sent one of his trustees, Godeskalk, on a diplomatic mission to Sigfred. On his return, Godeskalk was slain by the rebellious Saxons living to the north-east of the Elbe. When the Franks put down the rebellion they were helped by the prince of the Obotrites, Drozko, who would later on be dealt with by Sigfred's successor Gudfred. Poems by the Lombard literati Peter of Pisa and Paulus Diaconus convey a very negative image of Sigfred. Peter wrote that Charlemagne had let him choose between being fettered, imprisoned, or sent to convert Sigfred. In a poetic reply, Paulus castigated the Danish king as a wild beast who ruled over other wild animals; an uncouth pagan who would nevertheless be unable to stand up against the mighty Frankish ruler. If he dared molest Peter and his entourage and refuse Christianisation, he would quickly be led before Charlemagne's throne in fetters, abandoned by Odin (Waten) and Thor (Thonar). It is interesting that the characterization is similar to that accorded to Ongendus, one of Sigfred's predecessors in the early 8th century. The poems also indicate that the Danes had started to draw some attention from the Carolingian elite by this time. The reign of Sigfred had ended by 804 when another ruler, Gudfred, is mentioned in the Frankish annals.

== Place in early Danish history ==
Nothing is known about Sigfred's relationship to Gudfred, who succeeded him as king of Denmark c. 804–810, or later kings such as Hemming (810–812), Harald 'Klak' Halfdansson (812-813, 819–827) and Horik I (813–854). Since the name Sigfred was borne by a nephew of Gudfred, he is often taken to have been the father of Gudfred, since children were often named after their grandfathers.

The approximate dates of Sigfred's reign, and references to a King Harald who may have been either a predecessor, co-ruler or immediate successor of Sigfred, has led to speculations about a link with the legendary Swedish and Danish ruler Sigurd Hring. According to the sagas, Sigurd Hring defeated the Danish ruler Harald Wartooth at the Battle of Brávellir 2-3 generations before the first Danish conquest of England but the historicity of Hring, Wartooth and the battle are uncertain. According to the Tale of Ragnar Lodbrok saga, Sigurd Hring was the father of the legendary Viking leader Ragnar Lodbrok. Modern scholarship is in agreement that part of the genealogy of the early Viking Age kings of Denmark is of High medieval era documentation.

It has been theorized that Sigfred's father was Ongendus, or Angantyr, which is problematic because there is more than half a century between them. The two kings may nevertheless have been related since a Danish prince Angantyr is known to have flourished in 811, and the name is extremely unusual. The recurrence of the names Angantyr, Sigfred, Harald and Gudfred throughout the 8th and 9th centuries suggests that the kings of the early Viking Age were mutually related.

Regnal titles
Unknown	King of Denmark	Succeeded by Gudfred
