= Hemming of Denmark =

Hemming
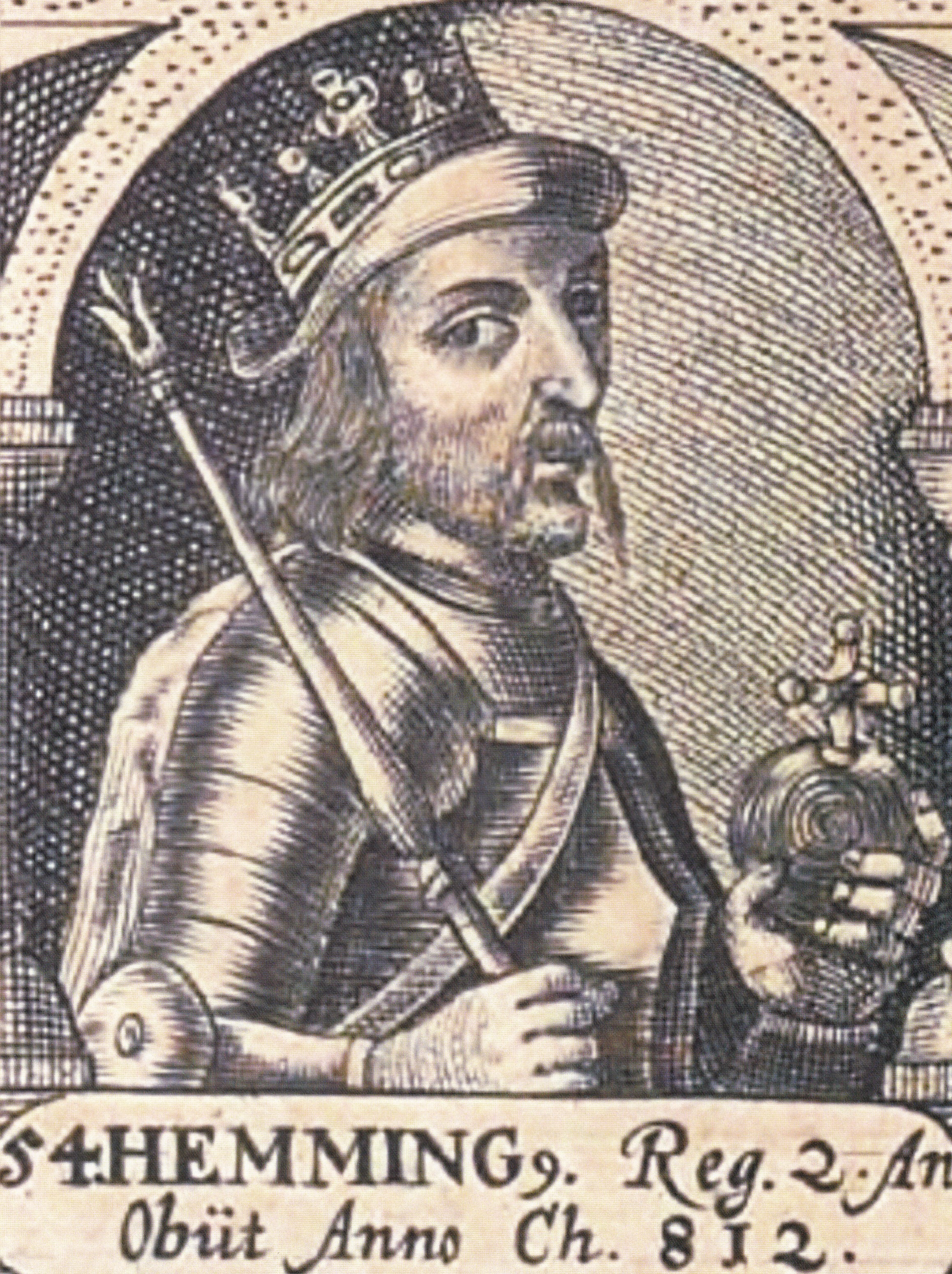
- Hemming as depicted in 1670

King of the Danes
- Reign: 810–812
- Predecessor: Gudfred
- Successor: Sigfred and Anulo
- Born: Late 8th century Denmark
- Died: 812; Denmark
- Dynasty: Sigfredian

Hemming I (died 812) was a king in Denmark from 810 until his death. He was the successor of King Gudfred, his uncle.

== Family ==
Hemming I is mentioned in the Royal Frankish Annals as son to an unnamed brother of Gudfred. Though Gesta Hammaburgensis ecclesiae pontificum by Adam of Bremen considers Hemming and Gudfred to be "patruelis", paternal cousins. Gudfred had several sons who served as co-rulers of the Danes. However, they are typically called "sons of Gudfred" without mention of their names or personal histories. The sole exception was Horik I who seems to have survived his siblings and was sole ruler by 827. They can all be considered paternal cousins of Hemming.

Another nephew of Gudfred, Reginold, is mentioned in the Royal Frankish Annals. He is also identified as son to an unnamed brother of Gudfred. He could be a sibling to Hemming. Assuming Gudfred had more than one sibling, Hemming and Reginold could also be paternal first cousins. Reginold appears in an 808 entry detailing a campaign of Gudfred against the Obotrites. Gudfred reportedly "made two-thirds of the Obodrites tributary. But he lost the best and most battle-tested of his soldiers. With them he lost Reginold, his brother's son, who was killed at the siege of a town along with a great number of Danish nobles."

Hemming had two siblings identified in the Annals, Hankwin and Angandeo. Sigifrid, one of his two rival successors on the throne, is also mentioned as a nephew of Gudfred. He could also be either a sibling or cousin to Hemming. Less clear is the relation of Hemming to the other rival successor, Anulo, and to the siblings of Anulo. Adam of Bremen considered Sigifrid and Anulo to be members of the same family, identifying both as nephews of Gudfred. The relation does not appear in the Royal Annals. However, there is an obscure phrase of the Annals which could support the relation. "Anulo, the nephew of Heriold and of the former king". The vague Latin phrase "Herioldi, et ipsius regis" has been translated variously as "Harald, and the king himself" and "Harald, previous king".

Various attempts have been made to harmonize these kings from the Frankish annals with the legendary kings found in the accounts of traditional historians such as Saxo Grammaticus and the sagas. History of the Northmen, or Danes and Normans, from the earliest times to the Conquest (1831) by Henry Wheaton suggested that Hemming was a direct descendant of Ragnar Lodbrok, equating Sigefrid of the annals with Sigurd Snake-in-the-Eye, the traditional son of Lothbrok, while making successor Gudfrid Sigurd's brother. An alternative reconstruction would make Gudfred identical to the Gudröd of Ynglingatal, semi-legendary king of Vestfold and himself son of Halfdan the Mild, who would then be the grandfather of Hemming. Other scholars reject these identifications and the legends to which they attempt to link, only crediting the annals as representing authentic history.

== Reign ==
The Royal Frankish Annals recorded the brief reign of Hemming. In 810, Charlemagne and Gudfred were in conflict. Gudfred had invaded Frisia and imposed tribute on its local population. He had then returned to Denmark. Charlemagne was preparing a retaliation campaign, gathering troops in the area of the Rhine. He led the assembled troops in the area where the Aller flows into the Weser River. There news reached him that Gudfred had died. "The fleet which ravaged Frisia had returned home and King Godofrid had been murdered by one of his retainers". Charlemagne called off the campaign.

The last entry for year 810 mentions "After the death of Godofrid, king of the Danes, Hemming, the son of his brother, succeeded to his throne and made peace with the emperor." The entries for 811 include detailed accounts of the negotiations between Hemming and Charlemagne. "The peace announced between the emperor and Hemming, the king of the Danes, was only sworn on arms because of the severity of the winter, which closed the road for traveling between the parties. Only with the return of spring and the opening of the roads, which had been closed because of harsh frost, did twelve magnates of each party and people, that is of Franks and Danes, meet on the River Eider at Heiligen and confirm the peace by an exchange of oaths according to their customs."

"The nobles of the Frankish side were Count Walach, son of Bernard, Count Burchard, Count Unroch, Count Odo, Count Meginhard, Count Bernard, Count Egbert, Count Theothari, Count Abo, Count Osdag, and Count Wigman. On the Danish side there were Hankwin and Angandeo, Hemming's brothers, and in addition, other men distinguished among this people: Osfrid nicknamed Turdimulo, Warstein, Suomi, Urm, another Osfrid, son of Heiligen, and Osfrid of Schonen, and Hebbi and Aowin.

New envoys of Hemming are reported meeting Charlemagne in Aachen during November, 811. "About the middle of November he [Charlemagne] came to Aachen. The envoys of King Hemming, Aowin and Hebbi, came to meet him and brought presents and assurances of peace." The entries in 811 end by mentioning the death of Charles the Younger (4 December 811) and Charlemagne wintering in Aachen. The entries in 812 begin with mention of the situation in Denmark. "Not much later the news arrived that Hemming, king of the Danes had died. Sigifrid, the nephew of King Godofrid, and Anulo, the nephew of Heriold and of the former king, both wished to succeed him. Being unable to agree on who should be king, they raised troops, fought a battle, and were both killed. The party of Anulo won, however, and made his brothers Heriold and Reginfrid their kings. The defeated party out of necessity had to go along with Anulo's party and did not reject the brothers as their kings. They say that ten thousand nine hundred and forty men died in that battle." Heriold, usually translated Harald, this man was Harald Klak.

The Annales Fuldenses give an almost identical account of this reign. This is not surprising as the entries of the Annales Fuldenses from 714 to the 830s were adopting material from earlier sources, including the Royal Frankish Annals. Hemming also appears in an 810 entry of the Gesta Hammaburgensis ecclesiae pontificum by Adam of Bremen. "After their king Gudfred (Latin: Gotafridus) had subjected the Frisians and likewise the Nordalbingians, the Abodrites, and other Slavic peoples to tribute, he threatened even Charles with war. This strife very seriously retarded the emperor's purpose with respect to Hamburg. When at length, by the dispensation of Heaven, Gudfred died, Hemming, his cousin, succeeded and soon made peace with the emperor, accepting the Eider River as the boundary of the kingdom." The term used in Latin was "patruelis" which would mean a paternal cousin.

== Literature ==
- Simon Coupland (1998), "From poachers to gamekeepers: Scandinavian warlords and Carolingian kings", Early Medieval Europe, 7: 85–114, doi:10.1111/1468-0254.00019, S2CID 161148239

== Sources ==
- Nithard (1970). Carolingian Chronicles: Royal Frankish Annals and Nithard's Histories. Translated by Scholz, Bernhard Walter. University of Michigan Press.
- Thurston, Tina L. (2006). Landscapes of Power, Landscapes of Conflict: State Formation in the South Scandinavian Iron Age. Springer.

Regnal titles
Preceded by Gudfred	King of Denmark	Succeeded by Sigfred and Anulo
