= Gudfred =

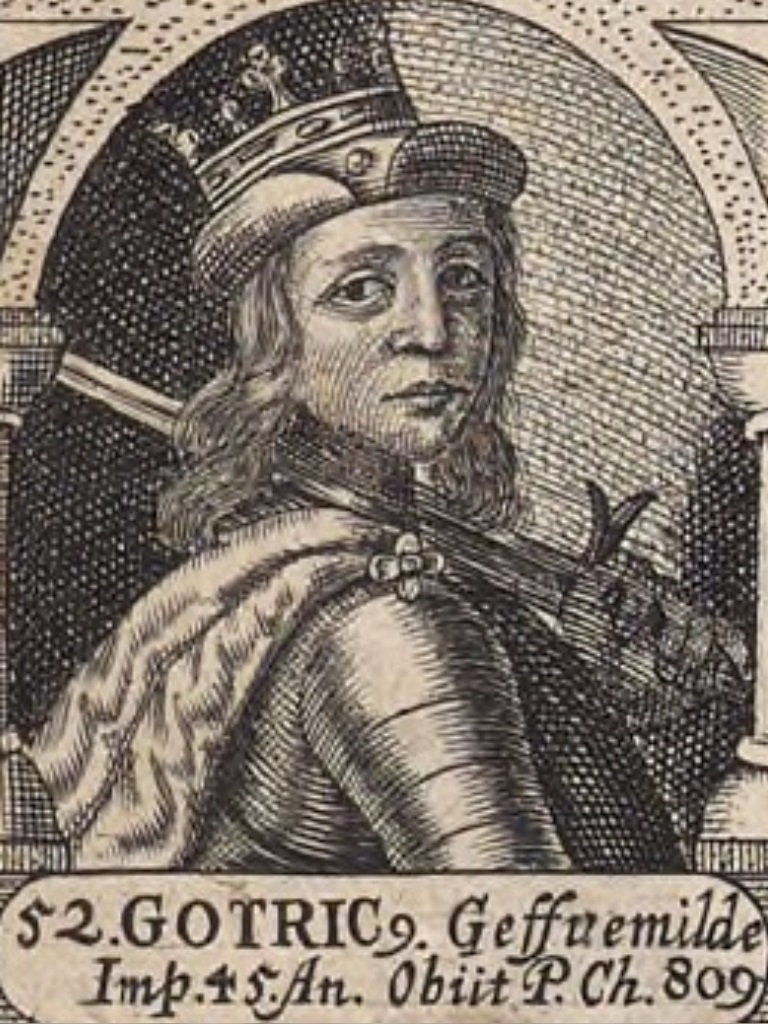
- Gudfred (Gøtrik den Gavmilde) as depicted in 1670

King of the Danes
- Reign: c. 804–810
- Predecessor: Sigfred
- Successor: Hemming
- Born: Late 8th century Denmark
- Died: 810; Denmark
- Issue: Horik I
- Dynasty: Sigfredian

Gudfred was a ninth century Danish king who reigned from at least 804 to 810. Alternate spellings include Godfred (Danish), Göttrick (German), Gøtrik (Danish), Gudrød (Danish), and Godofredus (Latin). He stands at the threshold of the history of Denmark in the sense that he is the first ruler about whom there is substantial knowledge from contemporary sources. He waged offensive war against the Carolingian Empire with some success, but was murdered under murky circumstances before a major confrontation had taken place. There is no unambiguous trace of Gudfred in the later Norse sagas, and his history can only be traced from the hostile Frankish texts which makes an assessment of his role problematic. His paternity is unknown but he may have been closely related to Sigfred, who preceded him as king of Denmark c. 770–804. He was the uncle of the later Danish King Hemming (810–812) and the father of King Horik I (813–854).

== Family ==
Gudfred is known to have sired at least five sons, as well as having at least five nephews. Several of them served as rulers or co-rulers of the Danes between 810 and 854. His sons are typically called "sons of Gudfred" without mention of their names, apart from Horik I. Various modern scholars have used later Scandinavian, Frankish and Irish sources in a speculative way to determine the names of some of his other sons: Olaf, Ragnar, Kettil. Nothing of this is conclusive, however. Hemming is mentioned in the Royal Frankish Annals as son to an unnamed brother of Gudfred. Other nephews were Ragnvald, Håkon, Angantyr and Sigfred. The Gesta Hammaburgensis ecclesiae pontificum of Adam of Bremen considers Hemming and Gudfred to be "patruelis", paternal cousins, but this is a derivative work. Horik I seems to have survived his siblings and cousins, and became the sole ruler around 828.

A rival royal branch, represented in the first place by Harald Klak (812-813, 819-827), based its claim on being kinsmen of a former King Harald. This Harald may have been a predecessor, co-ruler or short-lived successor of Sigfred.

== Failed diplomatic overtures ==
Towards the end of the 8th century, the Danes and their Saxon neighbours were facing challenges from the Franks under the expansive regime of Charlemagne. In 798, the Saxons were defeated by the Obodrites, a West Slavic people allied to the Frankish Emperor Charlemagne, at the Battle of Bornhöved (or Schwentine River). In 804, a Frankish army penetrated as far as the Ejder (Eider), Denmark's southern boundary at the time. In the face of these developments Gudfred promised to meet Charlemagne in person for a parley. After some time he appeared at Sliesthorp (Schleswig, Hedeby) with his fleet and the entire cavalry of his kingdom. This place marked the border between Saxony and Gudfred's realm. However, the king's men advised Gudfred against meeting the emperor, and he failed to appear. Charlemagne established a camp at Hollenstedt at the Elbe and sent an errand to Gudfred, asking him to extradite some rebels who had taken refuge in the Danish kingdom. Nothing is known to have come out of this, and the emperor returned to Cologne in September in the same year.

Three years after these events, in 807, a Danish chief called Halfdan swore allegiance to Charlemagne for protection. He is often assumed to have been the father of the later king and pretender Harald Klak and brother of the former King Harald, which probably means that he refused to pay allegiance to Gudfred due to a dynastic contest. It may be that Halfdan became earl of some wealthy market towns south of the river Ejder, occupying what became known as North Frisia. This region later became a base for his descendants.

== Viking invasion of the Obodrite lands ==
Gudfred resolved to attack the Obodrites in the old Saxon territories. The seaborne invasion was successful in spite of considerable Danish losses. During a siege his brother's son Ragnvald, the second man in the kingdom, fell together with several chiefs. Now Gudfred conquered a number of Slavic strongholds and made two districts pay taxes to him. The Obodrite prince Drożko (lat: Thrasco, Thrasucon) was expelled from his land, and another chief called Godelaib was captured by trickery and hanged. The Slavic Linones, Smeldingi and Wiltzes, the last-mentioned being old enemies of the Obodrites, preferred to fight on the Danish side.

Before returning to his kingdom, Gudfred destroyed the important port Reric by the Baltic coast, probably in the modern Blowatz municipality. It is specified that Reric was a Danish name, and that the port brought great advantages to Gudfred's kingdom through the imposition of fees. By this feat he may have impeded Charlemagne from using Reric as part of a strategic trade route. The merchants were forced to follow the Viking fleet to Sliesthorp where the king stayed for some time and drew up plans for the future. Fearing Frankish reprisals, he now decided to seal the border to Saxony with a wall, later known as Danevirke. As well established by modern archaeology, a defensive wall existed long before the time of Gudfred, from about 450-500. While the Frankish annals give the impression of a new creation, it was therefore an improvement. Archaeologists have recently identified it with a gigantic 4 km long and 3 m high Fieldstone Wall. The improved Danevirke ran from the Schlei toward the west coast of Denmark by means of the river Trende. The wall was built with an earthen embankment topped by a wooden stockade and protected from the south by a deep ditch. There was only one gate through which horsemen and wagons could move back and forth. Denmark's most important town, Sliesthorp or Hedeby, which apparently already existed on the Schlien, was expanded and garrisoned with Danish soldiers and the early sections of the wall were designed to protect it. Archaeological finds confirm that the town began to flourish in earnest around 810.

Hearing about the Danish invasion, Charlemagne ordered his son Charles the Younger to bring an army of Franks and Saxons to the Elbe, in case the rash Gudfred would try anything against the ethnic Saxon territory. Charles did not attempt to attack the Danish homeland but he ravaged the lands of the Linones and Smeldingi and then returned. In the next year 809, Gudfred informed Charlemagne via travelling merchants, that he was aware of the emperor's ire over the invasion, and wished to negotiate a political solution. The emissaries of Charlemagne met with the Danish grandees at Badenfliot at the river Eider, but failed to negotiate peace. Now the Obodrite prince Drożko appeared again with Saxon auxiliaries and ferociously attacked Gudfred's allies, the Wiltzes, in spite of the fact that his own son was a hostage at Gudfred's court. He then subjugated the Slavic lands which had acknowledged the Danish king and successfully reclaimed his old position. However, Drożko was soon murdered in the rebuilt Reric by assassins dispatched by Gudfred. That the emperor was seriously worried over "the presumptions and arrogance of the Danish king" is seen from the establishment of a garrison to the north of the Elbe, Esesfelth. He also enjoined his subjects to hold special religious services to avert the pagan threat.

== Invasion of Frisia and death ==
In 810 Charlemagne stayed at his main residence in Aachen, drawing up plans for a major military expedition against Gudfred. However, the Danish ruler forestalled his plans. A Viking fleet of 200 sails unexpectedly attacked Frisia. Gudfred did not follow the fleet but stayed at home. The Danes ravaged the islands off the coast, before landing at the mainland. The local troops met the marauders but were defeated in three battles, after which the inhabitants gave up. The Vikings forced the merchants and peasants to pay 100 pounds of silver as "tax", implying that the king claimed Northern Frisia as Danish territory. According to the contemporary historian Einhard, Gudfred "was stuck-up by such a vain hope that he claimed the lordship over all of Germany; also, he did not see Frisia and Saxony as anything else but his provinces".

Hearing this, the incensed emperor gathered whatever troops he could and established a camp at the confluence of Aller and Weser, awaiting the next step by the Danish ruler. As the annals say, "this king, intoxicated by the hope of victory, bragged that he wanted to fight the emperor on the open field". Before more had been done, however, news arrived about the withdrawal of the Viking fleet and the hasty demise of Gudfred, who had been murdered by one of his housecarls (satellitēs). Details about the drama are given by Notker of St Gall (c. 883), who is however unreliable. In this version Gudfred hunted ducks with falcon when he was attacked by his own son who cut him dead with his sword. The reason for the murder was that the king had abandoned his wife, who begged her son to avenge the slight.

The war against the Carolingian Empire ended with the demise of Gudfred. He was succeeded by his nephew Hemming without any known commotion, and the new ruler concluded a peace treaty with the Franks in 811. The Danish kingdom was incapacitated by violent dynastic infighting after 812 which temporarily diminished the Danish menace to the Frankish realm.

== The realm of Gudfred ==
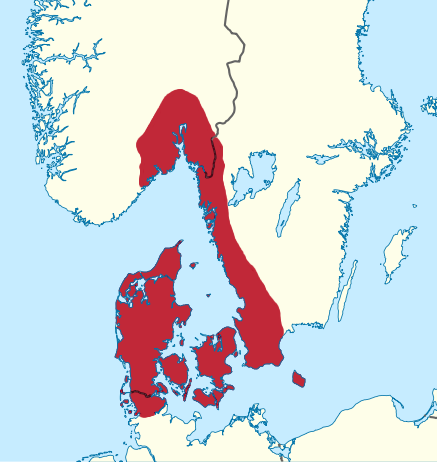
Realm of Gudfred (Borders are approximate)

Modern archaeology has found indications of a Danish kingdom of some consequence, several generations before Gudfred. The early urban center and coinage in Ribe (c. 700), the construction of the Kanhave Canal in Samsø (c. 726), and the early phases of the Danevirke (c. 737) suggest that at least parts of present-day Denmark were dominated by a nascent royal power in the 8th century. The rash and confronting politics of Gudfred may indicate that he had access to considerable resources. The Frankish annals only expressly state that Gudfred ruled in South Jutland, but there are some hints of a wider sphere of royal power in the early 9th century. The peace treaty of 811 mentions a delegate from Skåne (Sconaowe) which may speak for a Danish realm on both sides of Öresund. In 813 a rebellion against the current Danish kings broke out in Vestfold, suggesting temporary suzerainty over part of southern Norway.

== Possible connections with the saga literature ==
In spite of his historical importance, there is no clear trace of Gudfred in the Norse saga literature of the 12th-14th centuries. Saxo Grammaticus mentions him under the name Gøtrik, but his information is drawn from Adam of Bremen's chronicle (c. 1075) in conjunction with an unrelated Geatish saga character. According to Saxo, Gøtrik was followed on the throne by his son Olaf who strove to avenge his father and thereby involved Denmark in civil war. This Olaf is unknown to Frankish sources and seems to be from local Danish tradition. The genealogical poem Ynglingatal, the date of which is disputed, mentions a King Gudrød the Hunter of Vestfold, son of Halfdan the Mild and grandfather of Harald Fairhair of Norway, who was slain by the servant of his vengeful wife Åsa. The apparent similarities to the account of Notker of St Gall has led a number of scholars to assume that the two figures are identical. This may be strengthened by Snorri Sturluson's Heimskringla which mentions Gudrød as a Danish king (in Skåne). Most scholars nevertheless dismiss the identification as speculative.

Gudfred also occurs in continental medieval literature. In the poem La Chevalerie Ogier de Danemarche (around 1200) he is called Gaufroi de Danemarche, being the father of the renowned hero Ogier the Dane. In the poem Gudfred gives his son as hostage to Charlemagne.

Regnal titles
| Preceded by Sigfred | King of Denmark | Succeeded by Hemming |
