= Middle Angles =

Cultural sub-group of the Anglo-Saxons

Position of the Middle Angles in relation to other ethnic groups, c. 600

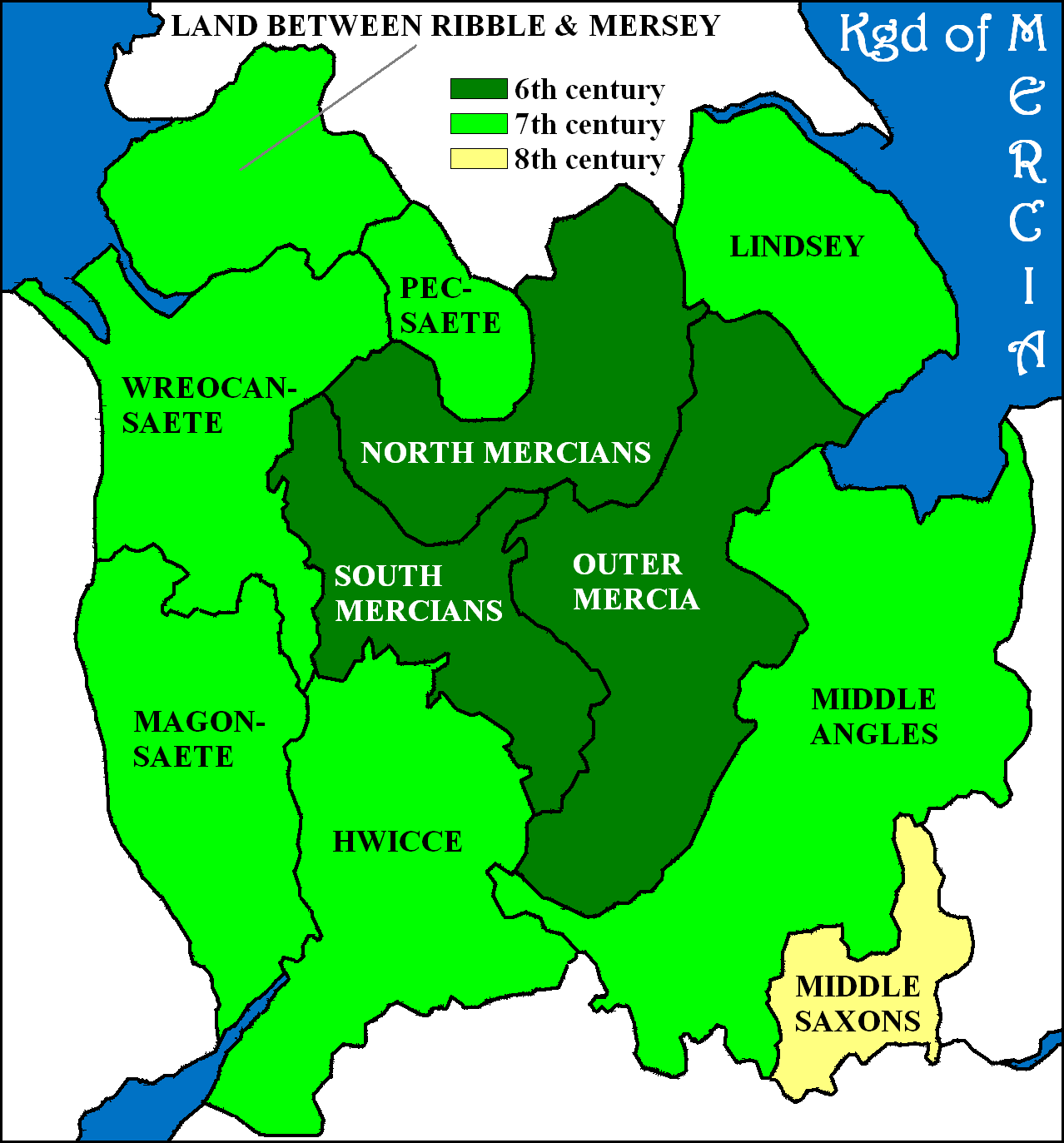
Middle Angles within Mercia

The Middle Angles were an important ethnic or cultural group within the larger kingdom of Mercia in England in the Anglo-Saxon period.

== Origins and territory ==
It is likely that Angles broke into the Midlands from East Anglia and the Wash early in the 6th century. Those who established their control first came to be called Middil Engli (Middle Angles). Their territory was centred in modern Leicestershire and East Staffordshire, but probably extended as far as the Cambridgeshire uplands and the Chilterns. This gave them a strategically important place within both Mercia and England as a whole, dominating both the great land routes of Watling Street and Fosse Way, and the major river route of the River Trent, together with its tributaries, the Tame and Soar.

== Mercia ==
The Middle Angles were incorporated into the wider kingdom of Mercia, apparently well before the reign of Penda (c.626–655), who evidently felt safe enough to locate his base in their territory. He placed his eldest son, Peada, in charge of the Middle Angles as sub-king. Bede specifies the Middle Angles as the target of a four-man Christian mission accepted by Peada, who converted to Christianity, partly in order to wed Alchflaed, the daughter of King Oswiu of Northumbria. This mission arrived in 653 and included St Cedd. Peada's conversion and acceptance of baptism in Northumbria possibly indicates a continuing sense of disunity or local particularism within Mercia. It is unlikely that Peada could have pursued so different a course from his father, at the strategic and political centre of the Mercian kingdom, without local support among the Middle Angles.

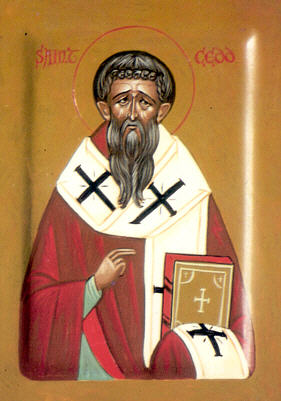
Saint Cedd, Apostle to the Middle Angles

Following the defeat and death of Penda (655), and the murder of Peada himself (656) at the instigation of his Northumbrian wife, Oswiu was able to dominate Mercia. He appointed one of the missionary priests, the Irish Diuma, bishop of the Middle Angles and the Mercians. Bede makes much of the fact that a shortage of priests compelled the appointment of one bishop to two peoples. This seems to indicate that the Middle Angles, while a central part of the Mercian kingdom, were clearly distinguished from the Mercians proper, a designation that seems to have been reserved for people settled further North and West. Diuma apparently died among the Middle Angles after a short but successful mission. His successor, Ceollach, another Irish missionary, returned home after a short time, for reasons that Bede does not specify. He was followed in turn by Trumhere and Jaruman.

Wulfhere, another son of Penda, continued to base his rule over Mercia among the Middle Angles, with the royal centre at Tamworth. In 669, after the death of Jaruman, he requested that the archbishop of Canterbury send a new bishop. This was Chad, brother of Cedd. According to Bede, Chad was designated "bishop of the Mercians and Lindsey people". In this case there is no doubt that the Middle Angles are subsumed into the category of the Mercians. The ecclesiastical centre for the entire vast region was established in Middle Angle territory, for Wulfhere donated land a short distance away from Tamworth, at Lichfield, to allow Chad to establish a monastery. It seems that the distinctions between the peoples within Mercia were gradually fading and that it was possible for them all to be described as Mercians. It is less clear whether this more accurately reflects the understanding of Chad's own time, or of Bede's, in the early 8th century.

== Political and ecclesiastical centre ==
Mercian monasteries

The knowledge of Middle Angles's political history is limited, the name is not used for the Tribal Hidage with smaller areas listed and identified to be part of or around the area. The ecclesiastical history is better recorded with an area comparable to the central Mercian diocese of Lichfield, the Middle Anglian territory was therefore a major ecclesiastical centre of the wider Mercian kingdom. The early ecclesiastical see was at Leicester.

The see moved to Dorchester-on-Thames with the Danelaw established under East Mercia, Leicester became one of the Five Burghs of Danelaw with Northampton as major centre of Danelaw. After Danelaw, the diocese of Lindsey merged with the See of Dorchester (with Leicester) to form the diocese of Lincoln.

== See also ==
- Bedfordshire
- Saint Albans
- Northamptonshire
- Soke of Peterborough
