= Chad of Mercia =

Bishop of York and Lichfield from 664 to 669

Saint Chad
- Bishop of Northumbria
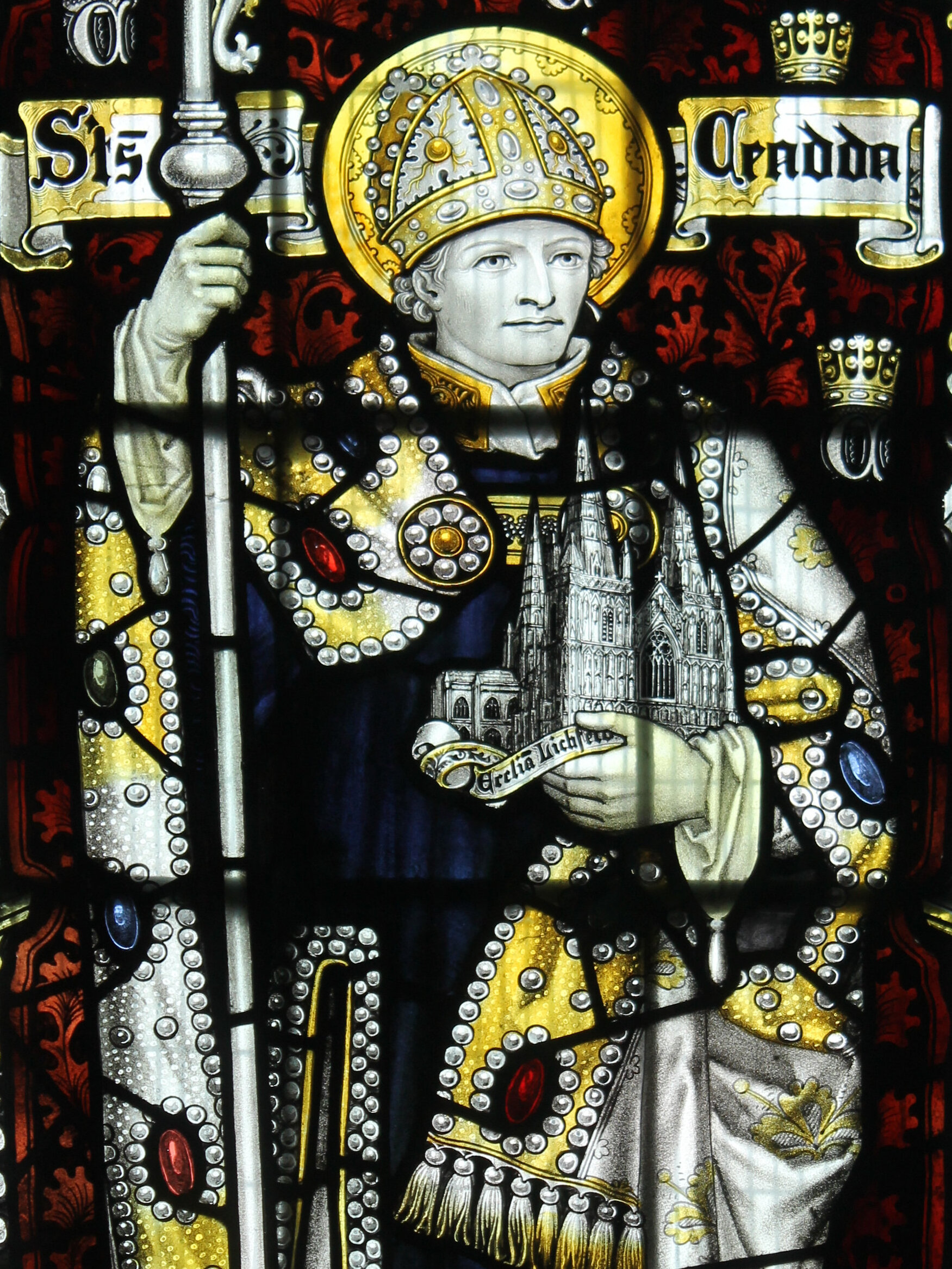
- Stained glass depiction from Saint Chad's Church in Hanmer, Maelor, Wales
- Appointed: 664
- Term ended: 669
- Predecessor: Paulinus
- Successor: Wilfrid

Orders
- Consecration: 664

Personal details
- Born: Unknown, but most likely in the 620s Northumbria
- Died: 2 March 672 Lichfield, Staffordshire
- Buried: Lichfield Cathedral

Sainthood
- Feast day: 2 March
- Venerated in: Catholic Church; Anglican Communion; Eastern Orthodox Church
- Attributes: Bishop, holding a triple-spired cathedral (Lichfield)
- Patronage: Mercia; Lichfield
- Shrines: Grave and shrine tower was discovered in 2003 under the east end of Lichfield Cathedral nave.: St Chad's Cathedral, Birmingham, where bones attributed to Chad were installed in 1841.

Chad (Old English: Ceadda; died 2 March 672) was a prominent 7th-century Anglo-Saxon monk. He was an abbot, Bishop of the Northumbrians and then Bishop of the Mercians and Lindsey People. After his death he was known as a saint.

He was the brother of Bishop Cedd, also a saint. He features strongly in the work of Bede and is credited, together with Bishop Wilfrid of Ripon, with introducing Christianity to the Mercian kingdom.

== Sources ==
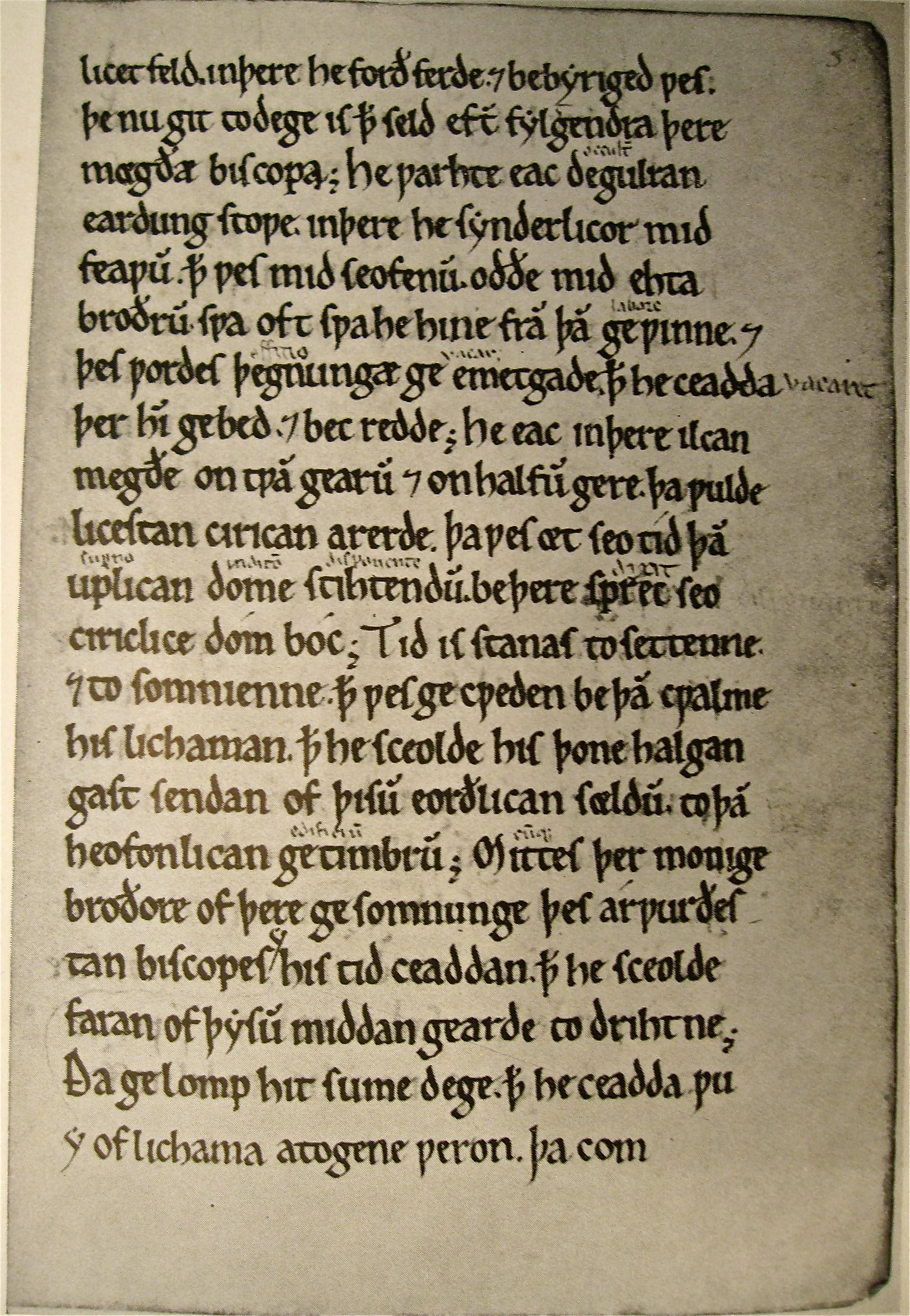
From a late copy of The old Englisch Homely on the life of St. Chad, c. 1200, in the Bodleian Library, Oxford

Most of what is known of Chad comes from Bede's Ecclesiastical History of the English People and, to a lesser extent, Stephen of Ripon's Vita Sancti Wilfrithi ("Life of Wilfrid"). Bede wrote several decades after Chad's death, but states that he obtained information about Chad and his brother Cedd from the monks of Lastingham, where both had served as abbots. Bede also records that one of his own teachers, Trumbert, had been trained by Chad at Lastingham.

== Early life and education ==
=== Family links ===
Chad was one of four brothers, all active in the Anglo-Saxon church. The others were Cedd, Cynibil and Caelin. Chad seems to have been Cedd's junior, arriving on the political scene about ten years after Cedd. It is reasonable to suppose that Chad and his brothers were drawn from the Northumbrian nobility. They certainly had close connections throughout the Northumbrian ruling class. However, the name Chad is actually of British Celtic, rather than Anglo-Saxon, origin. It is an element found in the personal names of many Welsh princes and nobles of the period and signifies "battle".

=== Education ===
The only major fact that Bede gives about Chad's early life is that he was a student of Aidan at the Celtic monastery at Lindisfarne. In fact, Bede attributes the general pattern of Chad's ministry to the example of Aidan and his own brother, Cedd, who was also a student of St Aidan.

Aidan was a disciple of Columba and was invited by King Oswald of Northumbria to come from Iona to establish a monastery. Aidan arrived in Northumbria in 635 and died in 651. Chad must have studied at Lindisfarne some time between these years.

=== Travels in Ireland and dating of Chad's life ===
A number of ecclesiastical settlements were established in 7th-century Ireland to accommodate European monks, particularly Anglo-Saxon monks. Around 668, Bishop Colman resigned his see at Lindisfarne and returned to Ireland. Less than three years later he erected an abbey in County Mayo exclusively for the English monks in the village of Mayo, subsequently known as Maigh Eo na Saxain ("Mayo of the Saxons").

Chad is thought to have completed his education in Ireland as a monk before he was ordained a priest, but Bede does not explicitly mention this. One of his companions in Ireland would have been Egbert of Ripon. Egbert was of the Anglian nobility, probably from Northumbria. Bede places them among English scholars who arrived in Ireland while Finan and Colmán were bishops at Lindisfarne. This suggests that they left for Ireland some time after Aidan's death in 651. They went to Rath Melsigi, an Anglo-Saxon monastery in County Carlow, for further study. In the controversy over the keeping of Easter, Rath Melsigi accepted the Roman computation.

In 664, the twenty-five year old Egbert barely survived a plague that had killed all his other companions. Chad had by then already left Ireland to help his brother Cedd establish the monastery of Lastingham or Laestingaeu in Yorkshire.

The Benedictine rule was slowly spreading across Western Europe. Chad was trained in an entirely distinct monastic tradition that tended to look back to Martin of Tours as an exemplar. The Irish and early Anglo-Saxon monasticism experienced by Chad was peripatetic, stressed ascetic practices, and had a strong focus on Biblical exegesis, which generated a profound eschatological consciousness. Egbert recalled later that he and Chad "followed the monastic life together very strictly – in prayers and continence, and in meditation on Holy Scripture". Some of the scholars quickly settled in Irish monasteries, while others wandered from one master to another in search of knowledge. Bede says that the Irish monks gladly taught them and fed them, and even let them use their valuable books, without charge.

== Founding of Lastingham ==
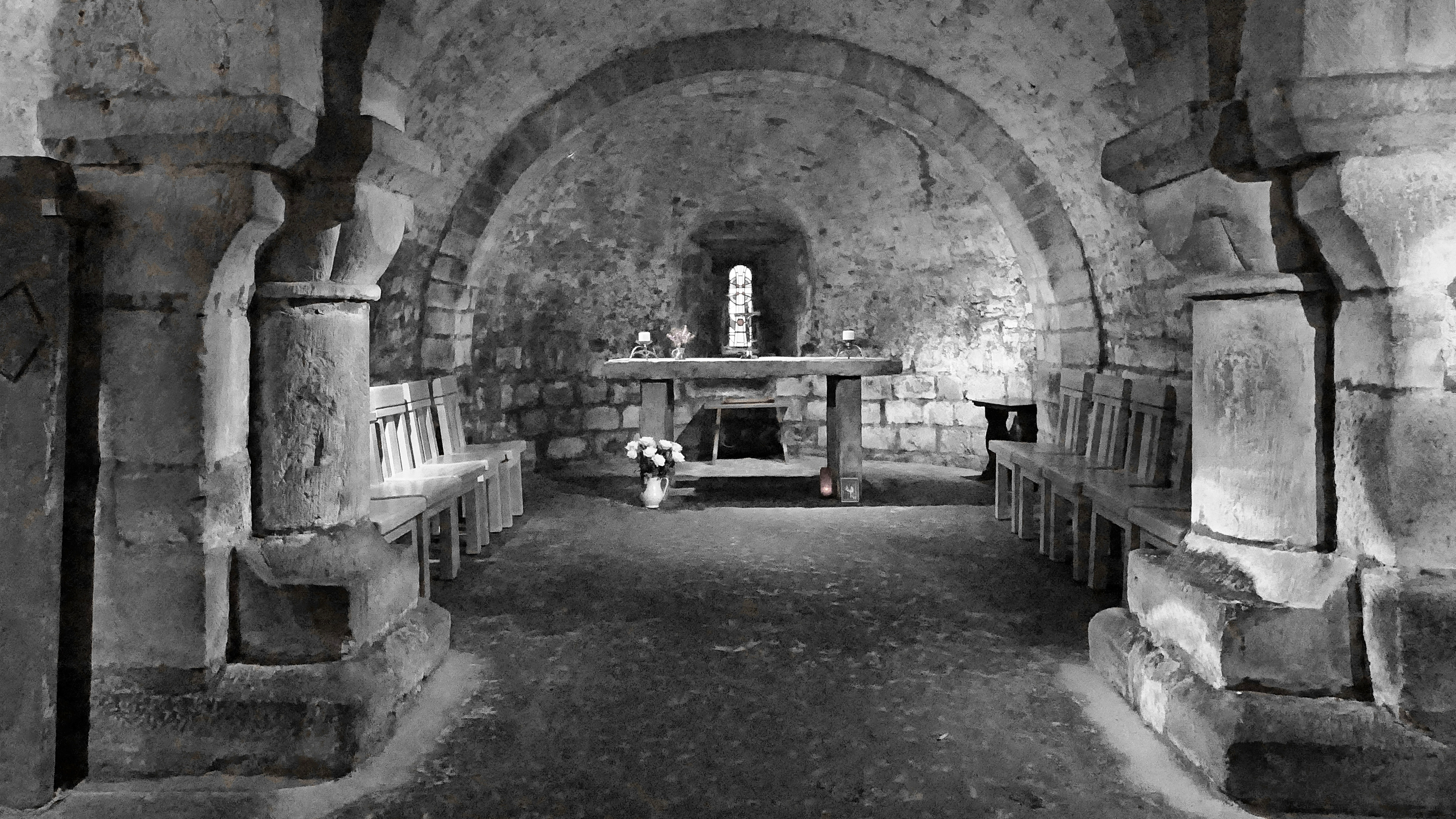
The altar in the crypt of the Church of St Mary, Lastingham, probable site of the early Anglo-Saxon church where Cedd and Chad officiated at Eucharist

King Oswiu of Northumbria appointed his nephew, Œthelwald, to administer the coastal area of Deira. Chad's brother Cælin was chaplain at Œthelwald's court. It was on the initiative of Cælin that Ethelwald donated land for the building of a monastery at Lastingham near Pickering in the North York Moors, close to one of the still-usable Roman roads. Caelin introduced Ethelwold to Cedd. The monastery became a base for Cedd, who was serving as a missionary bishop in Essex.

Bede says that Cedd "fasted strictly in order to cleanse it from the filth of wickedness previously committed there". On the thirtieth day of his forty-day fast, he was called away on urgent business. Cynibil, another of his brothers, took over the fast for the remaining ten days. The incident indicates the brothers’ ties with Northumbria's ruling dynasty. Laestingaeu was conceived as a base for the family and destined to be under their control for the foreseeable future – not an unusual arrangement in this period. Cedd was stricken by the plague, and upon his death in 664, Chad succeeded him as abbot.

=== Abbot of Lastingham ===
Chad's first appearance as an ecclesiastical prelate occurs in 664, shortly after the Synod of Whitby, when many Church leaders had been wiped out by the plague – among them Cedd, who died that year at Lastingham. On the death of his elder brother, Chad succeeded to the position of abbot.

Bede tells us of a man called Owin (Owen), who appeared at the door of Lastingham. Owin was a household official of Æthelthryth, an East Anglian princess who had come to marry Ecgfrith, Oswiu's younger son. He decided to renounce the world, and as a sign of this appeared at Lastingham in ragged clothes and carrying an axe. He had come primarily to work manually. He became one of Chad's closest associates.

Chad's eschatological consciousness and its effect on others is brought to life in a reminiscence attributed to Trumbert, who was one of his students at Lastingham. Chad used to break off reading whenever a gale sprang up and call on God to have pity on humanity. If the storm intensified, he would shut his book altogether and prostrate himself in prayer. During prolonged storms or thunderstorms he would go into the church itself to pray and sing psalms until calm returned. His monks regarded this as an extreme reaction even to English weather and asked him to explain. Chad explained that storms are sent by God to remind humans of the day of judgement and to humble their pride. The typically Celtic Christian involvement with nature was not like the modern romantic preoccupation but a determination to read in it the mind of God, particularly in relation to the last things.

== Rise of a dynasty ==
It is possible that he had only recently returned from Ireland when prominence was thrust upon him. However, the growing importance of his family within the Northumbrian state is clear from Bede's account of Cedd's career of the founding of their monastery at Lastingham in North Yorkshire. This concentration of ecclesiastical power and influence within the network of a noble family was probably common in Anglo-Saxon England: an obvious parallel would be the children of King Merewalh in Mercia in the following generation.

Cedd, probably the elder brother, had become a prominent figure in the Church while Chad was in Ireland. Probably as a newly ordained priest, he was sent in 653 by Oswiu on a difficult mission to the Middle Angles, at the request of their sub-king Peada, part of a developing pattern of Northumbrian intervention in Mercian affairs. After perhaps a year, he was recalled and sent on a similar mission to the East Saxons, being ordained bishop shortly afterwards. Cedd's position as both a Christian missionary and a royal emissary compelled him to travel often between Essex and Northumbria.

== Bishop of the Northumbrians ==
=== Need for a bishop ===
Bede gives great prominence to the Synod of Whitby in 663/4, which he shows resolving the main issues of practice in the Northumbrian Church in favour of Roman practice. Cedd is shown acting as the main go-between in the synod because of his facility with all of the relevant languages. Cedd was not the only prominent churchman to die of plague shortly after the synod. This was one of several outbreaks of the plague; they badly hit the ranks of the Church leadership, with most of the bishops in the Anglo-Saxon kingdoms dead, including the archbishop of Canterbury. Bede tells us that Colmán, the bishop of the Northumbrians at the time of the Synod, had left for Scotland after the Synod went against him. He was succeeded by Tuda, who lived only a short time after his accession. The tortuous process of replacing him is covered by Bede briefly, but in some respects puzzlingly.

=== Mission of Wilfrid ===
The first choice to replace Tuda was Wilfrid, a zealous partisan of the Roman cause. Because of the plague, there were not the requisite three bishops available to ordain him, so he had gone to the Frankish Kingdom of Neustria to seek ordination. This was on the initiative of Alfrid, sub-king of Deira, although presumably Oswiu knew and approved this action at the time. Bede tells us that Alfrid sought a bishop for himself and his own people. This probably means the people of Deira. According to Bede, Tuda had been succeeded as abbot of Lindisfarne by Eata, who had been elevated to the rank of bishop.

Wilfrid met with his own teacher and patron, Agilbert, a spokesman for the Roman side at Whitby, who had been made bishop of Paris. Agilbert set in motion the process of ordaining Wilfrid canonically, summoning several bishops to Compiègne for the ceremony. Bede tells us that he then lingered abroad for some time after his ordination.

=== Elevation ===

Bede implies that Oswiu decided to take further action because Wilfrid was away for longer than expected. It is unclear whether Oswiu changed his mind about Wilfrid, or whether he despaired of his return, or whether he never really intended him to become bishop but used this opportunity to get him out of the country.

Chad was invited then to become bishop of the Northumbrians by King Oswiu. Chad is often listed as a Bishop of York, but was more likely made Bishop of Northumbria. Bede generally uses ethnic, not geographical, designations for Chad and other early Anglo-Saxon bishops. However at this point, he does also refer to Oswiu's desire that Chad become bishop of the church in York. York later became the diocesan city partly because it had already been designated as such in the earlier Roman-sponsored mission of Paulinus to Deira, so it is not clear whether Bede is simply echoing the practice of his own day, or whether Oswiu and Chad were considering a territorial basis and a see for his episcopate. It is clear that Oswiu intended Chad to be bishop over the entire Northumbrian people, over-riding the claims of both Wilfrid and Eata.

Chad faced the same problem over ordination as Wilfrid, and so set off to seek ordination amid the chaos caused by the plague. Bede tells us that he travelled first to Canterbury, where he found that Archbishop Deusdedit was dead and his replacement was still awaited. Bede does not tell us why Chad diverted to Canterbury. The journey seems pointless, since the archbishop had died three years previously, which must have been well known in Northumbria, and was the reason Wilfrid had to go abroad. The most obvious reason for Chad's tortuous travels would be that he was also on a diplomatic mission from Oswiu, seeking to build an encircling alliance around Mercia, which was rapidly recovering from its position of weakness. From Canterbury he travelled to Wessex, where he was ordained by bishop Wini of the West Saxons and two British, i.e. Welsh, bishops. None of these bishops was recognised by Rome. Bede points out that "at that time there was no other bishop in all Britain canonically ordained except Wini" and the latter had been installed irregularly by the king of the West Saxons.

Bede describes Chad at this point as "a diligent performer in deed of what he had learnt in the Scriptures should be done." Bede also tells us that Chad was teaching the values of Aidan and Cedd. His life was one of constant travel. Bede says that Chad visited continually the towns, countryside, cottages, villages and houses to preach the Gospel. The model he followed was one of the bishop as prophet or missionary. Basic Christian rites of passage, baptism and confirmation, were almost always performed by a bishop, and for decades to come they were generally carried out in mass ceremonies, probably with little systematic instruction or counselling.

=== Removal ===
In c. 666, Wilfrid returned from Neustria, "bringing many rules of Catholic observance", as Bede says. He found Chad already occupying the same position. It seems that he did not in fact challenge Chad's pre-eminence in his own area. Rather, he would have worked assiduously to build up his own support in sympathetic monasteries, like Gilling and Ripon. He did, however, assert his episcopal rank by going into Mercia and even Kent to ordain priests. Bede tells us that the net effect of his efforts on the Church was that the Irish monks who still lived in Northumbria either came into line with Catholic practices or left for home. Nevertheless, Bede cannot conceal that Oswiu and Chad had broken with Roman practice in many ways and that the Church in Northumbria had been divided by the ordination of rival bishops.

In 669, a new Archbishop of Canterbury, Theodore of Tarsus, sent by Pope Vitalian arrived in England. He immediately set off on a tour of the country, tackling abuses of which he had been forewarned. He instructed Chad to step down and Wilfrid to take over. According to Bede, Theodore was so impressed by Chad's show of humility that he confirmed his ordination as bishop, while insisting he step down from his position. Chad retired gracefully and returned to his post as abbot of Lastingham, leaving Wilfrid as bishop of the Northumbrians at York.

== Bishop of the Mercians ==
=== Recall ===
Later that same year, King Wulfhere of Mercia requested a bishop. Wulfhere and the other sons of Penda had converted to Christianity, although Penda himself had remained a pagan until his death (655). Penda had allowed bishops to operate in Mercia, although none had succeeded in establishing the Church securely without active royal support.

Archbishop Theodore refused to consecrate a new bishop. Instead he recalled Chad out of his retirement at Lastingham. According to Bede, Theodore was impressed by Chad's humility and holiness. This was displayed particularly in his refusal to use a horse; he insisted on walking everywhere. Despite his regard for Chad, Theodore ordered him to ride on long journeys and went so far as to lift him into the saddle on one occasion.

Chad was consecrated bishop of the Mercians (literally, frontier people) and of the Lindsey people (Lindisfaras). Bede tells us that Chad was actually the third bishop agreed by Wulfhere, making him the fifth bishop of the Mercians. The Kingdom of Lindsey, covering the north-eastern area of modern Lincolnshire, was under Mercian control, although it had in the past sometimes fallen under Northumbrian control. Later Anglo-Saxon episcopal lists sometimes add the Middle Angles to his responsibilities. They were a distinct part of the Mercian kingdom, centred on the middle Trent and lower Tame – the area around Tamworth, Lichfield and Repton that formed the core of the wider Mercian polity. It was their sub-king, Peada, who had secured the services of Chad's brother Cedd in 653, and they were frequently considered separately from the Mercians proper, a people who lived further to the west and north.

=== Monastic foundations ===
Under the patronage of Wulfhere, many monasteries were founded by Wilfrid and the site at Lichfield was selected as the centre for the new Mercian diocese. Archbishop Theodore made Chad Bishop of Mercia in 669. The Lichfield minster was similar to that at Lastingham, and Bede made clear that it was partly staffed by monks from Lastingham, including Chad's faithful retainer, Owin. Lichfield was close to the old Roman road of Watling Street, the main route across Mercia, and Icknield Street to the north.

Wulfhere also gave Chad land for a monastery at Barrow upon Humber in North Lincolnshire. He travelled about on foot until the Archbishop of Canterbury gave him a horse and ordered him to ride it, at least on long journeys. Chad's shrine at Lichfield, sponsored by Bishop Walter de Langton, was destroyed in 1538.

Wulfhere also donated land sufficient for fifty families at a place in Lindsey, referred to by Bede as Ad Barwae. This is probably Barrow upon Humber: where an Anglo-Saxon monastery of a later date has been excavated. This was easily reached by river from the Midlands and close to an easy crossing of the River Humber, allowing rapid communication along surviving Roman roads with Lastingham. Chad remained abbot of Lastingham throughout his life, as well as heading the communities at both Lichfield and Barrow.

=== Ministry among the Mercians ===
Chad then proceeded to carry out missionary and pastoral work within the kingdom. Bede tells us that Chad governed the bishopric of the Mercians and of the people of Lindsey 'in the manner of the ancient fathers and in great perfection of life'. However, Bede gives little concrete information about the work of Chad in Mercia, implying that in style and substance it was a continuation of what he had done in Northumbria. The area he covered was very large, stretching across England from coast to coast. It was also, in many places, difficult terrain, with woodland, heath and mountain over much of the centre and large areas of marshland to the east. Bede does tell us that Chad built for himself a small house at Lichfield, a short distance from the church, sufficient to hold his core of seven or eight brothers, who gathered to pray and study with him there when he was not out on business.

Chad worked in Mercia and Lindsey for only two and a half years before he too died during a plague. Yet Bede could write in a letter that Mercia came to the faith and Essex was recovered for it by the two brothers Cedd and Chad. In other words, Bede considered that Chad's two years as bishop were decisive in Christianising Mercia.

=== Death ===
Chad died on 2 March 672, and was buried near the Church of Saint Mary which later became part of Lichfield Cathedral. Bede relates the death story as that of a man who was already regarded as a saint. Bede has stressed throughout his narrative that Chad's holiness communicated across boundaries of culture and politics, to Theodore, for example, in his own lifetime. The death story is important to Bede, confirming Chad's holiness and vindicating his life. The account occupies more space in Bede's account than all the rest of Chad's ministry in Northumbria and Mercia together.

Bede noted that Owin was working outside the oratory at Lichfield. Inside, Chad studied alone because the other monks were at worship in the church. Suddenly Owin heard the sound of joyful singing, coming from heaven, at first to the south-east, but gradually coming closer until it filled the roof of the oratory itself. Then there was silence for half an hour, followed by the same singing going back the way it had come. Owin at first did nothing, but about an hour later Chad called him in and told him to fetch the seven brothers from the church. Chad gave his final address to the brothers, urging them to keep the monastic discipline they had learnt. Only after this did he tell them that he knew his own death was near, speaking of death as "that friendly guest who is used to visiting the brethren". He asked them to pray, then blessed and dismissed them. The brothers left, sad and downcast.

Owin returned a little later and saw Chad privately. He asked about the singing. Chad told him that he must keep it to himself for the time being: angels had come to call him to his heavenly reward, and in seven days they would return to fetch him. So it was that Chad weakened and died after seven days on 2 March, which remains his feast day. Bede wrote that: "he had always looked forward to this day, or rather his mind had always been on the Day of the Lord". Many years later, his old friend Egbert told a visitor that someone in Ireland had seen the heavenly company coming for Chad's soul and returning with it to heaven. Significantly, with the heavenly host was Cedd. Bede was not sure whether or not the vision was actually Egbert's own.

Bede's account of Chad's death confirms the main themes of his life. Primarily he was a monastic leader, deeply involved in the small communities of loyal brothers who formed his mission team. His consciousness was strongly eschatological: focussed on the last things and their significance. Finally, he was inextricably linked with Cedd and his other brothers.

== Cult and relics ==
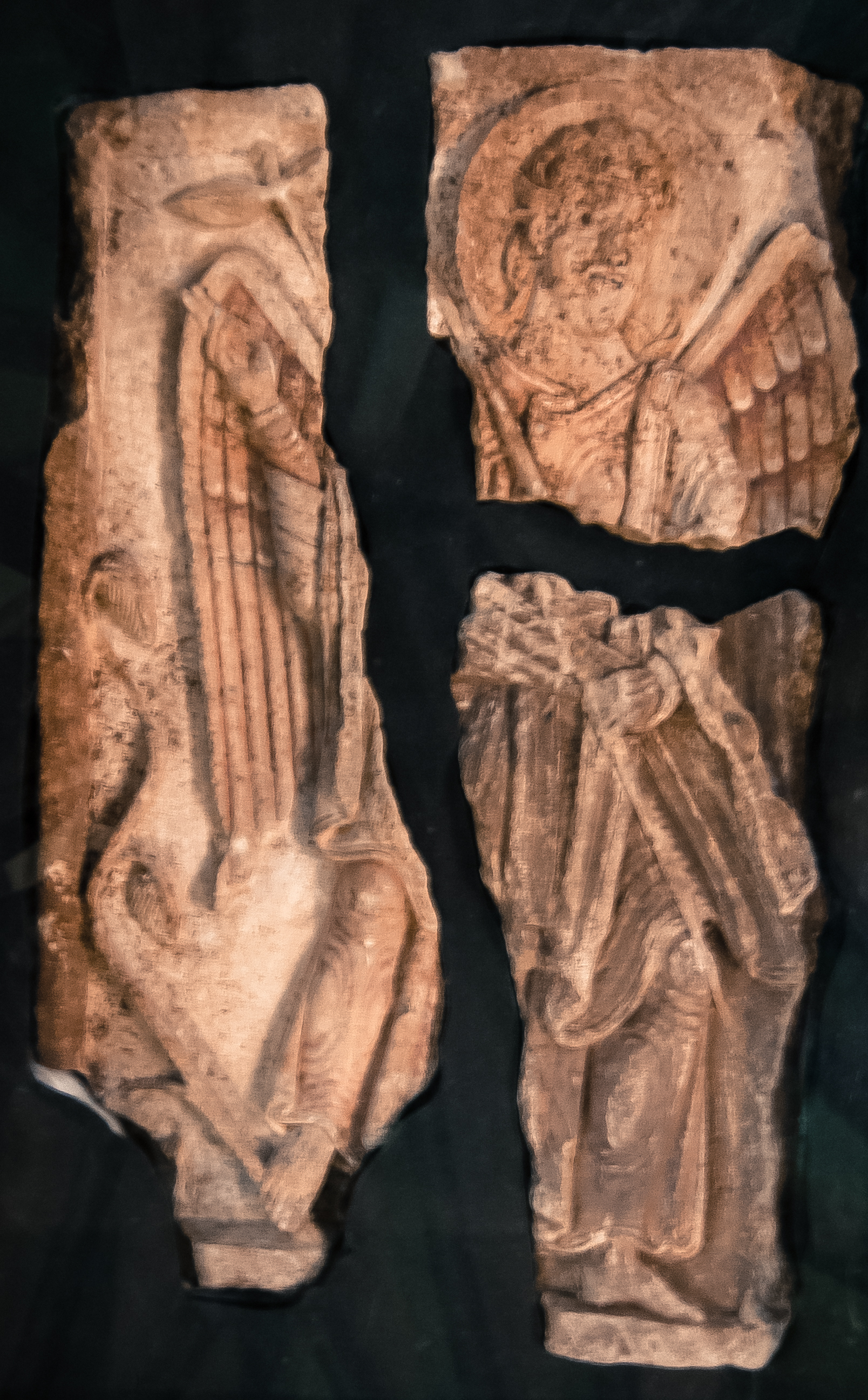
The Lichfield Angel, a part of his Anglo-Saxon shrine in Lichfield Cathedral

Chad is considered a saint in the Roman Catholic, the Anglican churches, the Celtic Orthodox Church and is also noted as a saint in a new edition of the Eastern Orthodox Synaxarion (Book of Saints). His feast day is celebrated on 2 March.

According to Bede, Chad was venerated as a saint immediately after his death, and his relics were translated to a new shrine. He remained the centre of an important cult, focused on healing, throughout the Middle Ages. The cult had twin foci: his tomb in the nave and more particularly his skull, kept in a special Head Chapel, alongside the south choir aisle.

Bishop Rowland Lee, a president of the Council of the Marches, made a heartfelt plea to King Henry VIII during the Reformation. He begged the king to spare the shrine of the cathedral's first bishop, whom he described as its "greatest ornament." The request was likely granted because that same bishop had secretly married Henry to Anne Boleyn.

This was a unique act of preservation during a time when many religious artifacts were being destroyed, but it was only a temporary reprieve. The shrine was later robbed and torn down.

The transmission of the relics after the Reformation was tortuous. At the dissolution of the shrine on the instructions of King Henry VIII in 1538, Prebendary Arthur Dudley of Lichfield Cathedral removed and passed them to his nieces, Bridget and Katherine Dudley, of Russells Hall near Dudley. In 1651, they reappeared when a farmer Henry Hodgetts of Sedgley was on his death-bed and kept praying to St Chad. When the priest hearing his last confession, Fr Peter Turner SJ, asked him why he called upon Chad. Henry replied, "because his bones are in the head of my bed". He instructed his wife to give the relics to the priest, whence some of the relics found their way to the Seminary at St Omer, in France. In the early 19th century, they passed into the hands of Sir Thomas Fitzherbert-Brockholes of Aston Hall, near Stone, Staffordshire. When his chapel was cleared after his death, his chaplain, Fr Benjamin Hulme, discovered the box containing the relics, which were examined and presented to Bishop Thomas Walsh, the Roman Catholic Vicar Apostolic of the Midland District in 1837 and were enshrined in the new St Chad's Cathedral, Birmingham, opened in 1841, in a new ark designed by Augustus Pugin.

The relics, six bones, were enshrined on the altar of St Chad's Cathedral. They were examined by the Oxford Archaeological Laboratory by radiocarbon dating in 1985, and all but one of the bones (which was a third femur, and therefore could not have come from Chad) were dated to the 7th century, and were authenticated as 'true relics' by the Vatican authorities. In 1919, an Annual Mass and Solemn Outdoor Procession of the Relics was held at St Chad's Cathedral in Birmingham. This observance continues to the present, on the Saturday nearest to his Feast Day, 2 March.

In November 2022, one bone relic was returned to Lichfield Cathedral and is housed in a new shrine in the retrochoir and close to where they were located in medieval times. Lichfield Cathedral is a significant pilgrimage church-cathedral and the new shrine is a focus for all pilgrims ending their journey.

The Lichfield Angel, a late 8th-century Anglo-Saxon stone carving, was discovered at Lichfield Cathedral in 2003. It depicts the archangel Gabriel, likely as the left-hand portion of a larger plaque showing the annunciation, along with a lost right-hand panel of the Virgin Mary. The carving is thought to be the end piece of a shrine containing the remains of Chad.

Chad is remembered in the Church of England and the US Episcopal Church on 2 March.

== Portrayals of St Chad ==
There are no portraits or descriptions of St Chad from his own time. The only hint comes in the legend of Theodore lifting him bodily into the saddle, possibly suggesting that he was remembered as small in stature.

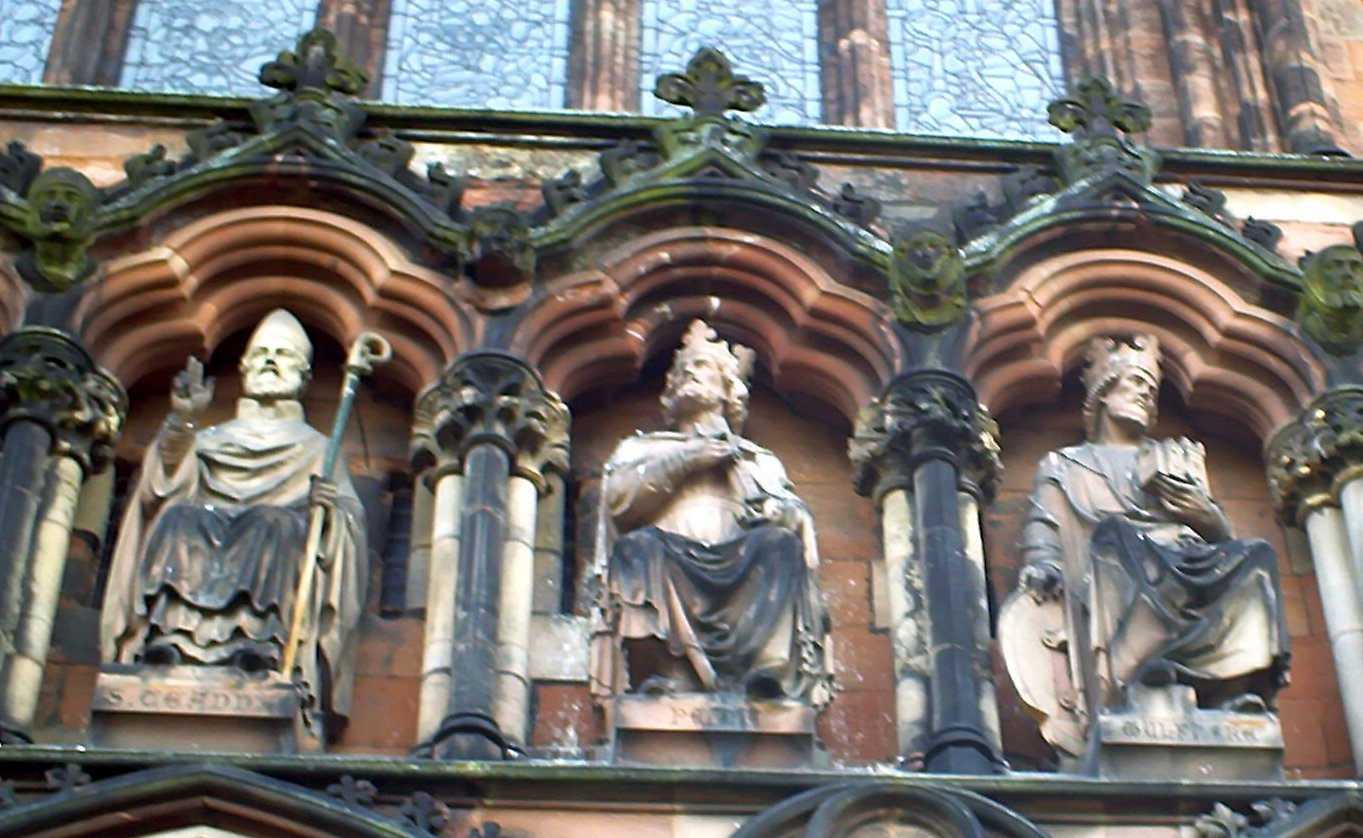
St Chad (left), alongside Mercian kings Peada and Wulfhere, as portrayed in 19th-century sculpture above the western entrance to Lichfield Cathedral

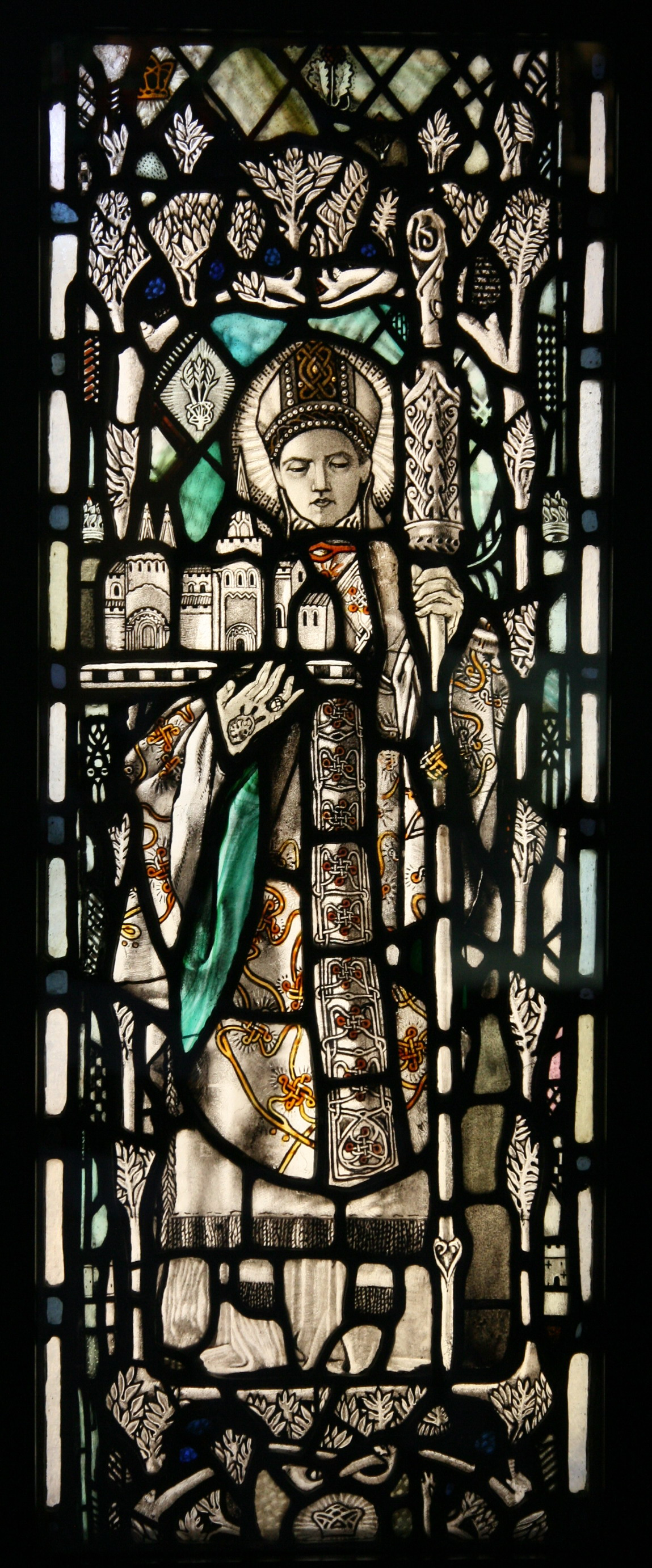
"Saint Chad", stained glass window by Christopher Whall. Currently exhibited at Victoria and Albert Museum, London.

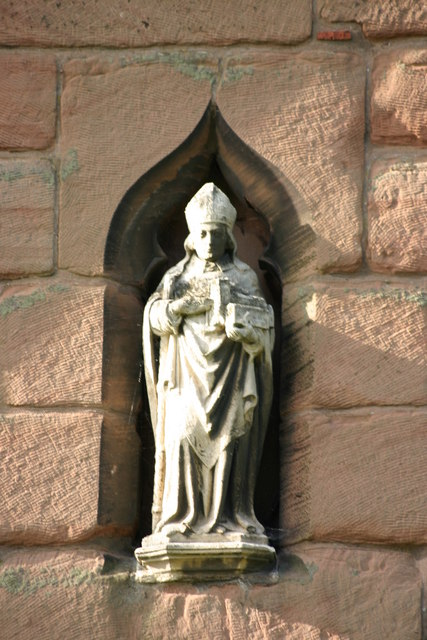
An example of a late sculpture of St Chad, from the Church of St Chad, Lichfield, 1930

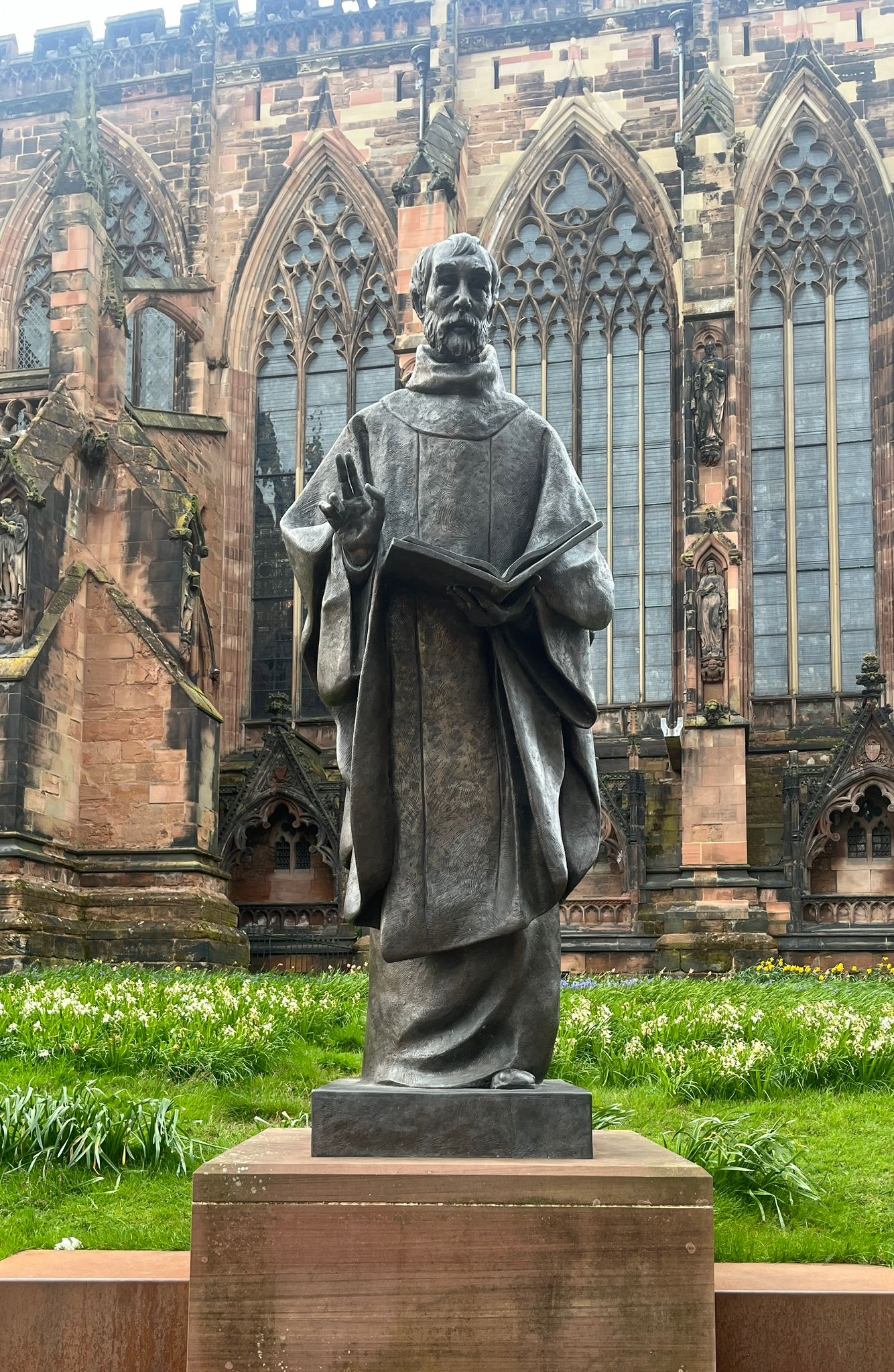
A sculpture of St Chad unveiled in 2021 outside Lichfield Cathedral

== Notable dedications ==
=== Churches ===
Chad gives his name to Birmingham's Roman Catholic cathedral, where there are some relics of the saint: about eight long bones. It is the only cathedral in England that has the relics of its patron saint enshrined upon its high altar. The Anglican Lichfield Cathedral, at the site of his burial, is dedicated to Chad, and St Mary, and still has a head chapel, where the skull of the saint was kept until it was lost during the Reformation. The site of the medieval shrine is also marked.

Chad also gives his name to a parish church in Lichfield (with Chad's Well, where traditionally Chad baptised converts: now a listed building).

Dedications are densely concentrated in the West Midlands. The city of Wolverhampton, for example, has two Anglican churches and an Academy dedicated to Chad, while the nearby village of Pattingham has both an Anglican church and primary school. Shrewsbury had a large medieval church of St Chad which fell down in 1788: it was quickly replaced by a circular church in Classical style by George Steuart, on a different site but with the same dedication. Parish Church in Montford, built in 1735–1738, site of the graves of the parents of Charles Darwin. Parish Church in Coseley built in 1882. In Rugby, Warwickshire, an Orthodox Church is named for him. Further afield, there is a considerable number of dedications in areas associated with Chad's career, like the churches in Church Wilne in Derbyshire, Far Headingley in Leeds, the Parish Church of Rochdale, Greater Manchester, and the Church of St Chad, Haggerston in London, as well as some in the Commonwealth, like Chelsea in Australia. There is also a St Chad's College within the University of Durham, founded in 1904 as an Anglican hall.

In Canada, St Chad's Chapel and College was built in 1918 in Regina. Originally, it was a Catholic church and boys' school. In 1964, it became an Anglican school for girls, called St Chad's Girls' School. Today, it is a protected historic building in Regina.

The Principal Parish of the Personal Ordinariate of Our Lady of the Southern Cross is named the Church of St Ninian and St Chad.

The chapel of Brasenose College, Oxford is named the Chapel of St Hugh and St Chad.

=== Toponyms ===
Chadkirk Chapel in Romiley, Greater Manchester, may have been dedicated to St Chad; as Kenneth Cameron points out, -kirk ("church") toponyms incorporate the name of the dedicatee more often than that of the patron. The chapel dates back to the 14th century, but the site is much older, possibly dating back to the 7th century when it is believed St Chad visited to bless the well there.

St Chad's Well near Battle Bridge on the River Fleet in London was a medicinal well dedicated to St Chad. It was destroyed by the Midland Railway company in 1860, and is remembered in the street name of St Chad's Place.

The Worcestershire town of Kidderminster was thought by one 19th-century author to be named for a minster dedicated to Chad or Cedd, but modern scholars give the etymology of the name as "Cydela's monastery".

=== Schools ===
The heraldic cross of St Chad "a cross potent and quadrate" is used in the arms of the dioceses of Lichfield, Coventry and Derby, of Birmingham Newman University, and of St Chad's College, Durham University.

Denstone College in Denstone, Uttoxeter, in Staffordshire was founded by Nathaniel Woodard as the flagship Woodard School of the Midlands. The school was founded as St Chad's College, Denstone. The school chapel is named the Chapel of St Chad with depictions of him around the chapel's narthex. The students of the school wear the cross of St Chad which is the school's logo. The motto of the school is Lignum Crucis Arbor Scientae which is Latin for ‘The Wood of the Cross is the Tree of Knowledge’. There are also depictions of him in the school's quadrangle.

=== Chad as a personal name ===
Chad remains a fairly popular given name, one of the few personal names current among 7th-century Anglo-Saxons to do so. However, it was little used for many centuries before a modest revival in the mid-20th century.

== Patronage ==
Due to the somewhat confused nature of Chad's appointment and the continued references to 'chads', small pieces of ballot papers punched out by voters using voting machines in the 2000 US Presidential Election, it has been jocularly suggested that Chad is the patron saint of botched elections. There is no official patron saint of elections, although the Church has designated a later English official, Thomas More, the patron of politicians.

The Spa Research Fellowship states that Chad is the patron saint of medicinal springs, although other listings do not mention this patronage.

St Chad's Day (2 March) is traditionally considered the most propitious day to sow broad beans in England.

== Legacy ==
St Chad's College is a college of Durham University.

St. Chad's Episcopal Church in Albuquerque, New Mexico was established in the 1970s.

Christian titles
Preceded by Jaruman as Bishop of Mercia	Bishop of the Mercians and Lindsey People; 669–672	Succeeded by Winfrith as Bishop of Lichfield
Vacant Title last held by Paulinus as Bishop of York	Bishop of the Northumbrians; 664–669	Succeeded by Wilfrid
Preceded by Tuda as Bishop of Lindisfarne	Bishop of the Northumbrians; 664–669	Succeeded by Wilfrid
