= October 6 (Eastern Orthodox liturgics) =

Day in the Eastern Orthodox liturgical calendar

Eastern Orthodox liturgical calendar
October 5	October 6	October 7
October 6 O.S. ≍ October 19 N.S. October 6 N.S ≍ September 23 O.S.

An Eastern Orthodox cross

October 6 in Eastern Orthodox liturgical calendars is a feast day and a day of commemoration of saints and martyrs. Although some Orthodox churches use the Revised Julian Calendar and others use the traditional Julian calendar, the fixed commemorations for their respective October 6 are broadly the same, no matter which calendar is used. (Note: Despite the dates being the same, the days to which they refer typically differ by 13 days. The notation Old Style or O.S. is sometimes used to indicate a date in the traditional Julian Calendar (the "Old Calendar"). The notation New Style or N.S. indicates a date in the Revised Julian calendar (the "New Calendar").)

== Saints ==
- Holy and Glorious Apostle Thomas (1st century)
- Virgin Martyr Erotheis (Eroteis) of Cappadocia, by fire (Note: "Also, St. Erotis, martyr, who, being inflamed with the love of Christ, triumphed over the violence of the flames.")

== Pre-Schism Western saints ==
- Martyrs of Trier, innumerable martyrs slain for Christ in diverse ways, in Trier in Germany under Diocletian (287) (Note: "At Treves, the commemoration of almost numberless martyrs, who were put to death for the faith in various manners, under the governor Rictiovarus, in the persecution of Diocletian.")
- Virgin Martyr Faith (Foi. Foy), a holy virgin in Agen in the south of Gaul (France), burnt to death with companions under Maximian Herculeus (3rd century) (Note: "At Agen, in France, the birthday of St. Faith, virgin and martyr, whose example encouraged blessed Caprasius so much that he happily terminated his combat by martyrdom". Her shrine in Conques (Abbey Church of Saint Foy) is very famous.) (Note: "DACIANUS, governor of Spain under Diocletian and Maximian, was at one time at Agen, in Aquitania, and hearing that a certain noble damsel, named Faith, living in Agen, was a Christian, he summoned her before his tribunal and ordered her to renounce the faith of the Crucified. "From a child," answered the maiden, "I have served the Lord Jesus Christ with all my heart, and have confessed his name." Dacian produced the ordinary arguments, tried persuasion and threats in vain, and then sentenced her to be stretched over a fire on a brazen grate with her hands and feet tied to four posts. She endured the agony with great fortitude. The executioners raked up the coals under her and poured on fat, and the blaze rushing up enveloped her. According to one version of the Acts, a heavy fall of snow veiled her body as it lay on the burning bed, and the shower only ceased when she was dead. Many other Christians, moved by her heroism, surrendered themselves and were executed with the sword. The arm of S. Faith was anciently shown at Glastonbury. The crypt of S. Paul's Cathedral, London, is dedicated to S. Faith, and was at one time enriched with some of her relics. Her head is shown at Agen. In art S. Faith is represented as a maiden with a palmbranch and a grate.")
- Saint Romanus, Bishop of Auxerre, France (564) (Note: "At Auxerre, St. Romanus, bishop and martyr.") (Note: See: (in Italian) Romano di Auxerre. Wikipedia. (Italian Wikipedia).)
- Saint Magnus of Oderzo, born in Venice in Italy, he became Bishop of Oderzo on the Adriatic and later of Heraclea (c. 660) (Note: "At Oderzo, St. Magnus, bishop, whose body rests at Venice.")
- Saint Cumine the White, born in Ireland, he became Abbot of Iona and wrote a life of St Columba (669) (see also: February 24)
- Saint Ceollach, Bishop of the Mercians or Mid-Angles, before going to Iona and then returning to Ireland (7th century) (Note: "ST. CEOLLACH was appointed to succeed St. Diuma as second Bishop of the Mercians and Mid-Angles. Like his predecessor, he was an Irishman, and a monk of St. Columba's Monastery of lona. He administered his diocese but a short time, and then returned to his beloved retreat at lona. The latter period of his life was spent in Ireland, where he is honoured among the native Saints of the country.")
- Saint Pardulphus (Pardoux), born in Sardent near Guéret in France, he became a hermit, then went to the monastery of Guéret where he became abbot (c. 738) (Note: At the time of the Saracen invasion he remained alone in the monastery which he saved through his prayers.)
- Saint Aurea, a nun in Boves who became the abbess of a large convent (8th century)
- Saint Epiphania of Pavia, a nun at the convent of Santa Maria della Caccia, in Pavia in Italy (c. 800)
- Saint Lalluwy, Virgin

== Post-Schism Orthodox saints ==
- Venerable Cindeus (Cindeos, Kendeas) the Wonderworker of Cyprus, one of the "300 Allemagne Saints" in Cyprus (12th century) (Note: Venerable Cindeus (Kendeas) is one of the "300 Allemagne Saints" in Cyprus. The 300 Allemagne Saints came to Cyprus from Palestine, and lived as ascetics in various parts of the island. According to some of their lives in the Great Synaxaristes, after the dissolution of the Second Crusade (1147 - 1149), they decided to live the monastic life in the Jordan desert. However since the Latins there disturbed them, they relocated to Cyprus and dispersed over the island.)
- The Holy Six "Allemagne Saints", in Cyprus (12th century):

- Hilarion the New; John; Joseph, at Lythrodontas; Calantius of Tamassos; Cassianos of Glypha; Cassianos of Axylou

=== New Martys and Confessors ===
- New Venerable Martyr Macarius of Saint Anne's Skete, Mount Athos, at Prusa (Kion) in Bithynia (1590)
- New Hieroconfessor Michael Soyuzov, Archpriest of Kronstadt (1922)
- New Hieromartyr John Rybin, Priest (1937)

== Other commemorations ==
- Icon of the Most Holy Theotokos "O All-Hymned Mother"
- "Hodigitria" ("Directress") Icon of the Theotokos at Xenophontos Monastery, Mount Athos
- Glorification (1977) of Saint Innocent, the Metropolitan of Moscow and Enlightener of the Aleuts, Apostle to the Americas (1879)

== Icon gallery ==
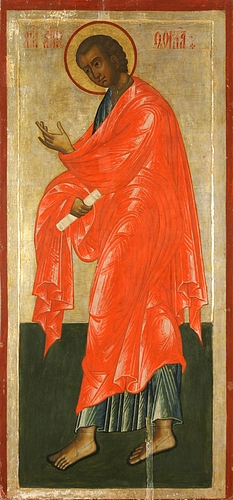
Apostle Thomas.

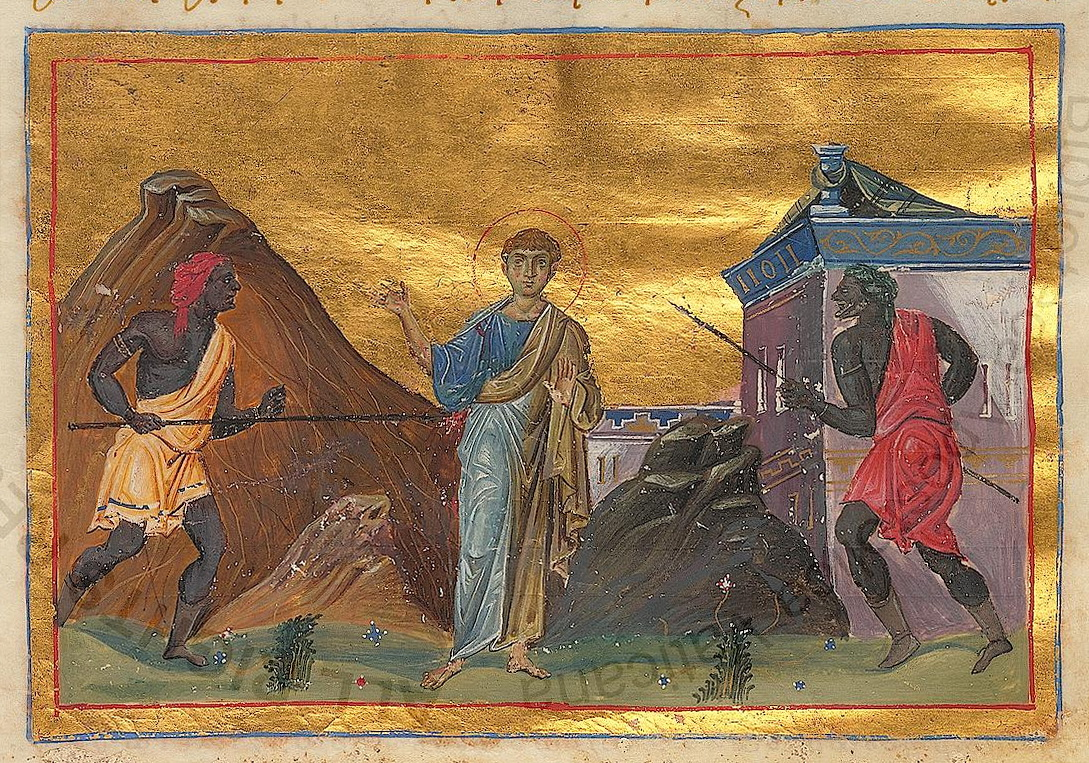
Apostle Thomas.
(Menologion of Basil II, 10th century).

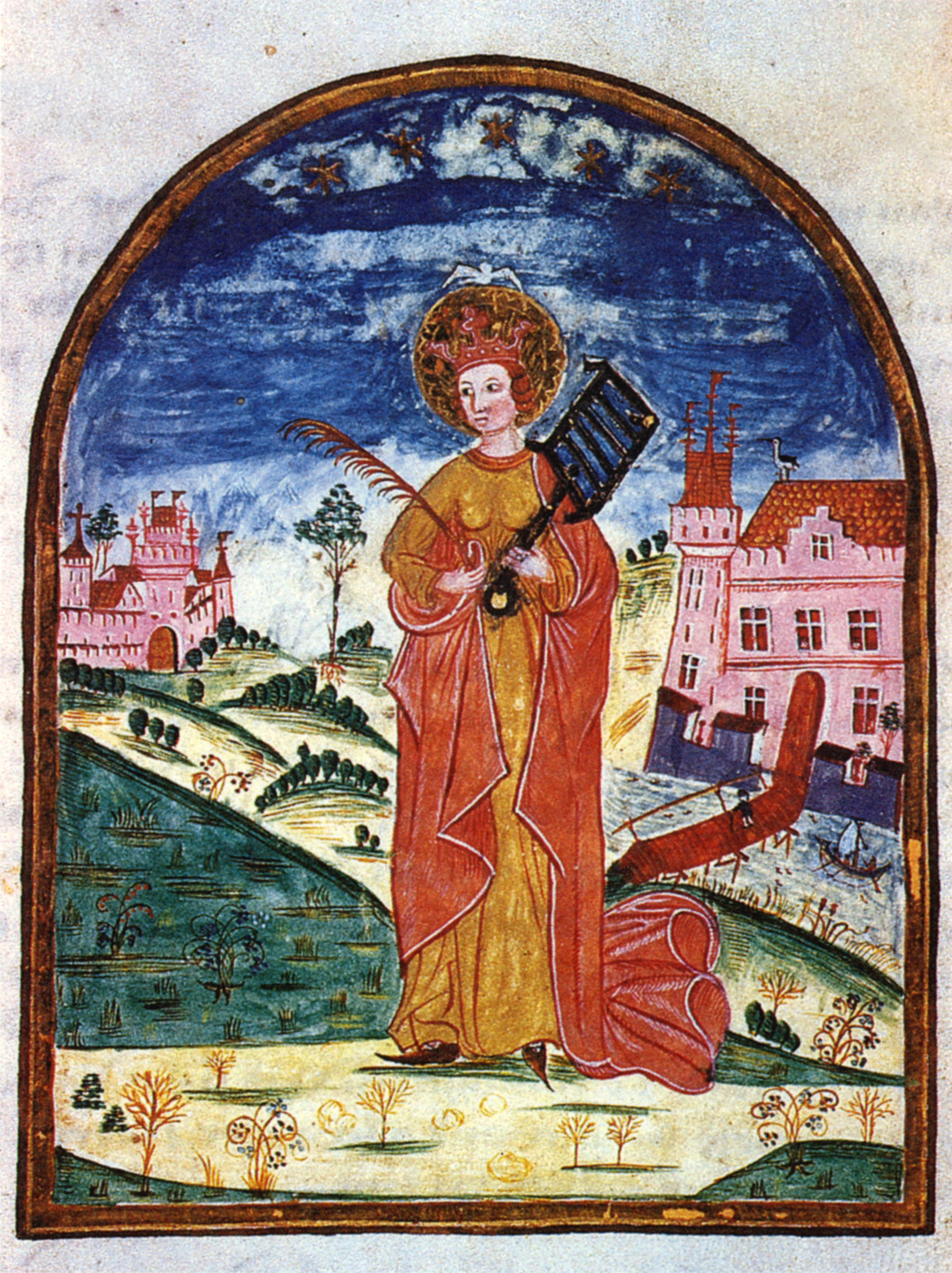
St. Faith (Foi. Foy).

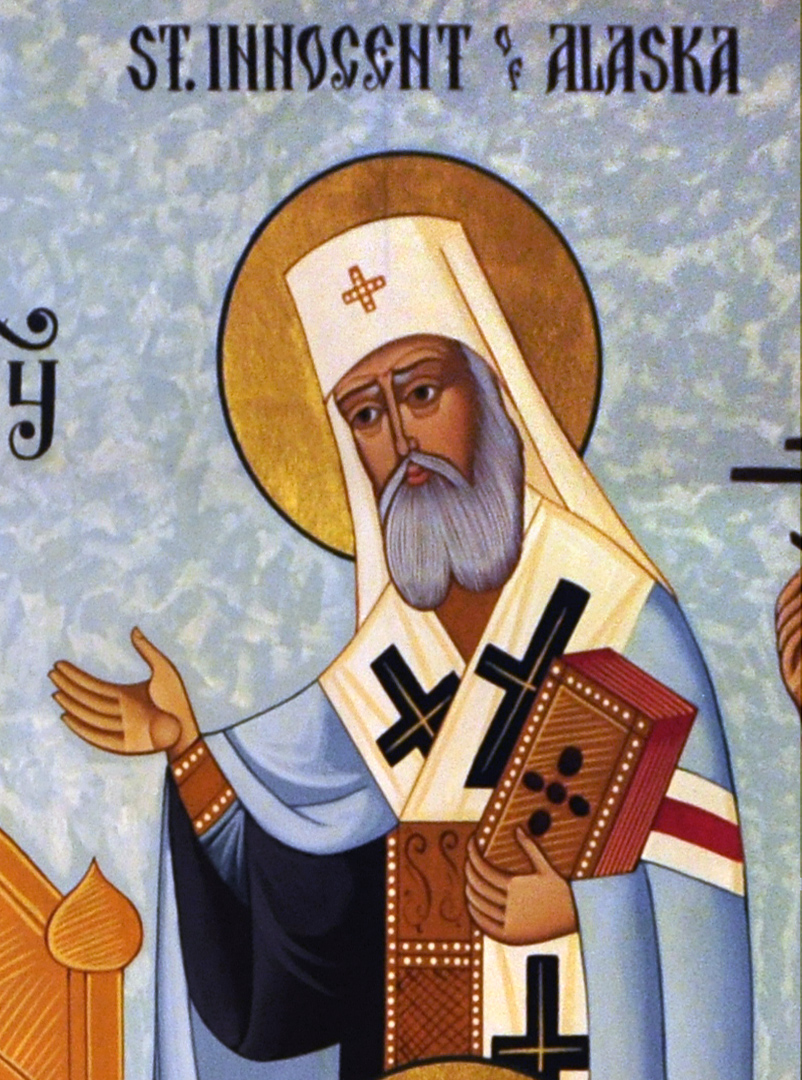
St. Innocent of Alaska.

== Sources ==
- October 6/19. Orthodox Calendar (PRAVOSLAVIE.RU).
- October 19 / October 6. HOLY TRINITY RUSSIAN ORTHODOX CHURCH (A parish of the Patriarchate of Moscow).
- October 6. OCA - The Lives of the Saints.
- The Autonomous Orthodox Metropolia of Western Europe and the Americas (ROCOR). St. Hilarion Calendar of Saints for the year of our Lord 2004. St. Hilarion Press (Austin, TX). p. 74.
- The Sixth Day of the Month of October. Orthodoxy in China.
- October 6. Latin Saints of the Orthodox Patriarchate of Rome.
- The Roman Martyrology. Transl. by the Archbishop of Baltimore. Last Edition, According to the Copy Printed at Rome in 1914. Revised Edition, with the Imprimatur of His Eminence Cardinal Gibbons. Baltimore: John Murphy Company, 1916. pp. 308–309.
- Rev. Richard Stanton. A Menology of England and Wales, or, Brief Memorials of the Ancient British and English Saints Arranged According to the Calendar, Together with the Martyrs of the 16th and 17th Centuries. London: Burns & Oates, 1892. pp. 477.

Greek Sources

- Great Synaxaristes: (in Greek) 6 ΟΚΤΩΒΡΙΟΥ. ΜΕΓΑΣ ΣΥΝΑΞΑΡΙΣΤΗΣ.
- (in Greek) Συναξαριστής. 6 Οκτωβρίου. ECCLESIA.GR. (H ΕΚΚΛΗΣΙΑ ΤΗΣ ΕΛΛΑΔΟΣ).
- (in Greek) 06/10. Ορθόδοξος Συναξαριστής.

Russian Sources

- (in Russian) 19 октября (6 октября). Православная Энциклопедия под редакцией Патриарха Московского и всея Руси Кирилла (электронная версия). (Orthodox Encyclopedia - Pravenc.ru).
- (in Russian) 6 октября по старому стилю / 19 октября по новому стилю. Русская Православная Церковь - Православный церковный календарь на 2016 год.
