= Cælin =

Cælin was one of four brothers named by Bede as active in the early Anglo-Saxon Church. The others were Cedd, Chad, and Cynibil.

The name Caelin is a spelling variant of the name of a West Saxon king Ceawlin, and is of Celtic rather than Anglo-Saxon derivation.

Bede portrays Cælin as a chaplain at the court of Ethelwald, a nephew of King Oswiu of Northumbria. Ethelwald was appointed to administer the coastal area of Deira. It was on the initiative of Cælin that Ethelwald donated land for the building of a monastery at Lastingham in the North York Moors. The monastery became a base for Cedd, who was serving as a missionary bishop in Essex, and for Chad, who succeeded him as abbot.
