= Lastingham =

Village and civil parish in North Yorkshire, England

Coordinates: 54.304°N 0.882°W

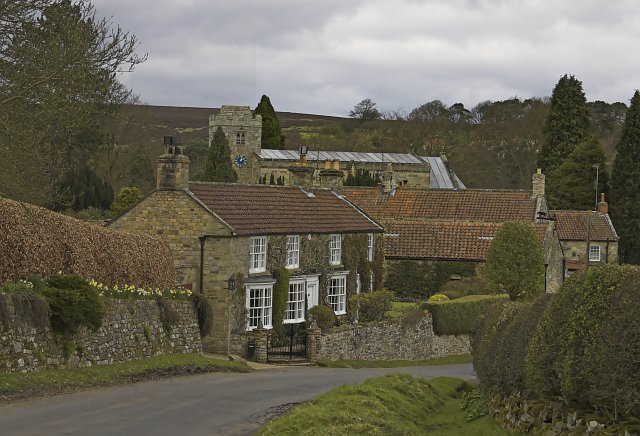
- Lastingham village

- Location within North Yorkshire
- Population: 233 (2011 census)
- OS grid reference: SE7290
- Civil parish: Lastingham
- Unitary authority: North Yorkshire
- Ceremonial county: North Yorkshire
- Region: Yorkshire and the Humber
- Country: England
- Sovereign state: United Kingdom
- Post town: YORK
- Postcode district: YO62
- Dialling code: 01751
- Police: North Yorkshire
- Fire: North Yorkshire
- Ambulance: Yorkshire
- UK Parliament: Thirsk and Malton

Lastingham is a village and civil parish in North Yorkshire, England. It is on the southern fringe of the North York Moors, 5 miles (8 km) north-east of Kirkbymoorside, and 1.5 miles (2.4 km) to the east of Hutton-le-Hole. It was home to the early missionaries to the Angles, the saints Cedd and his brother, Chad. At the 2001 census, the parish had a population of 96, increasing to 233 (including Spaunton) at the 2011 census.

== Etymology ==
Lastingham is first attested in Bede's Ecclesiastical History of the English People, in forms such as laestingaeu. This name is in Old English and is thought to come from a personal name Læst, combined with an Old English suffix denoting the descendants or tribe of a person, -ing, in the genitive plural case, combined with the Old English word conventionally spelled ēg, which usually means "island". Thus the name literally meant "island of the descendants of Læst", but since the site was not in fact an island, the name is taken to be metaphorical, referring to an "island" of good land amidst moorland.

The ēg element was later substituted with the word hām, which, north of the River Humber, was added to place-names when they acquired monasteries (other examples being Hexham and Coldingham). The form with -hām is first attested in the Domesday Book of 1086, in the spellings Lestingham and Lestinaham.

== History ==
Læstinga eu first appears in history when King Ethelwald of Deira (651-c.655) founded a monastery for his own burial. Bede attributes the initiative to Ethelwald's chaplain Caelin, brother of Cedd, Chad and Cynibil. Bede records that Cedd and Cynibil consecrated the site, and that Cynibil built it of wood. Cedd ruled the monastery as the first abbot until his death, combining this position with that of missionary bishop to the East Saxons. In 664, shortly after the Synod of Whitby, in which he was a key participant, Cedd died of the plague at Læstingau. Bede records that a party of monks from Essex came to mourn him and all but one were wiped out by the plague. Cedd was first buried outside the wooden monastery but, at some time between 664 and 732, a stone church was erected, and his body was translated to the right side of the altar. The crypt of the present parish church remains a focus for veneration of Cedd. His brother Chad took his place as abbot.

Not much is known of this house, though all who spoke of it spoke well. Perhaps the best indication of its standards is that, in 687, one of its graduates, Trumbert, transferred to Wearmouth-Jarrow and became scriptural tutor to a youthful Bede.

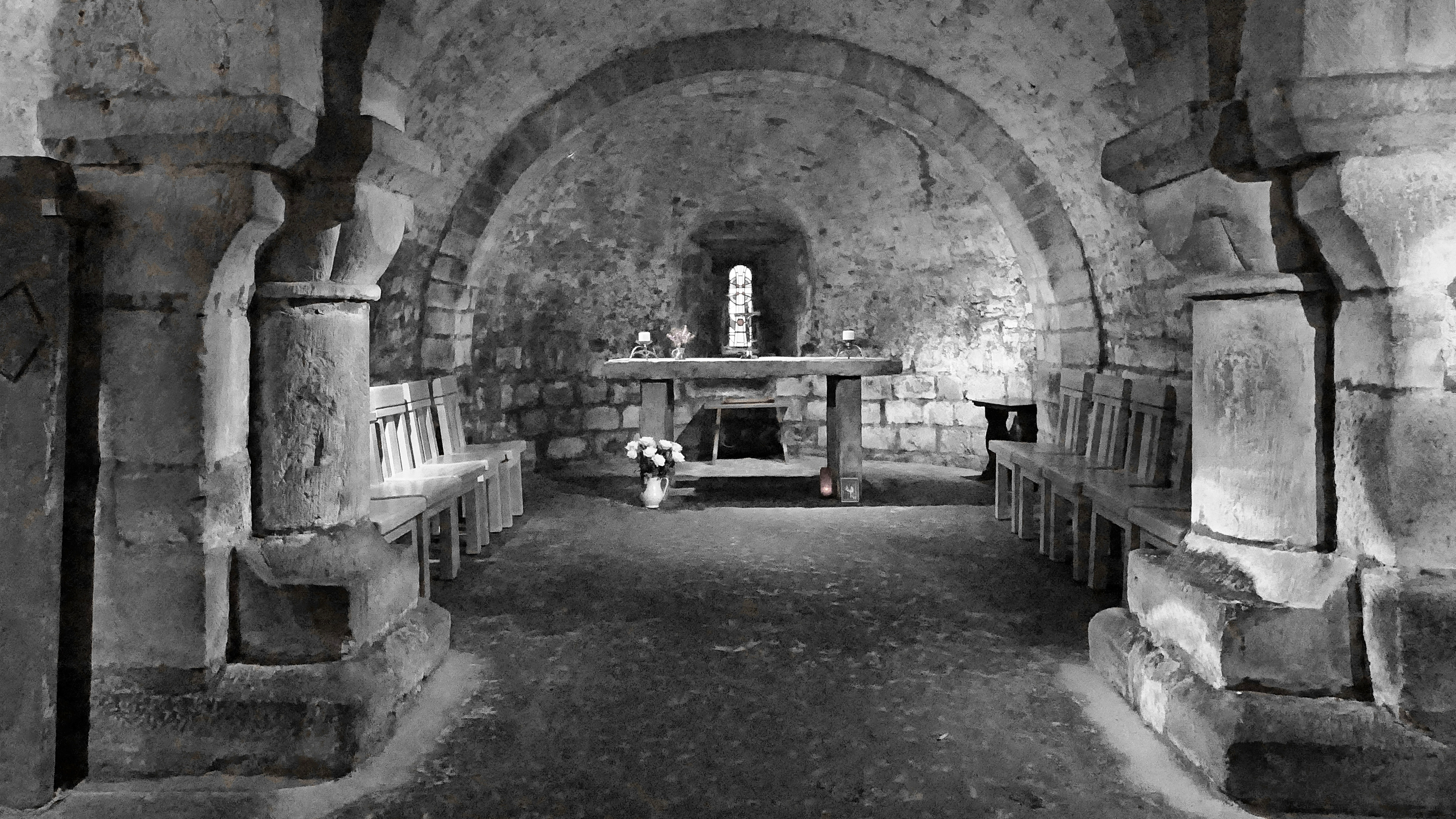
The altar in Lastingham crypt

It is not known what became of the original Anglo-Saxon structure. Destruction by the Danes is nowhere attested, and seems to be entirely the product of modern conjecture. An attempt was made to rebuild the monastery in 1078, when Stephen, prior of Whitby, and a band of monks moved from Whitby due to a disagreement with William de Percy. They received support from King William I and Berenger de Todeni in the form of one carucate of land in Lastingham, six carucates at Spaunton, and other lands in Kirkby. They remained on the site only eight years due to persistent harassment by bandits. In 1086 they moved to York, and founded St Mary's Abbey there, to which they annexed the lands of the monastery at Lastingham.

The place where the monastery was located is now the Church of St Mary, which attracts many visitors due to its rare Norman architecture and crypt with an apsidal chancel.

The present church also houses a war memorial commemorating soldiers from Lastingham and Spaunton who served in the First World War.

== Governance ==
Lastingham is in the historic North Riding of Yorkshire. From 1974 to 2023 it was part of the district of Ryedale. It is now administered by the unitary North Yorkshire Council.

== Notable people ==
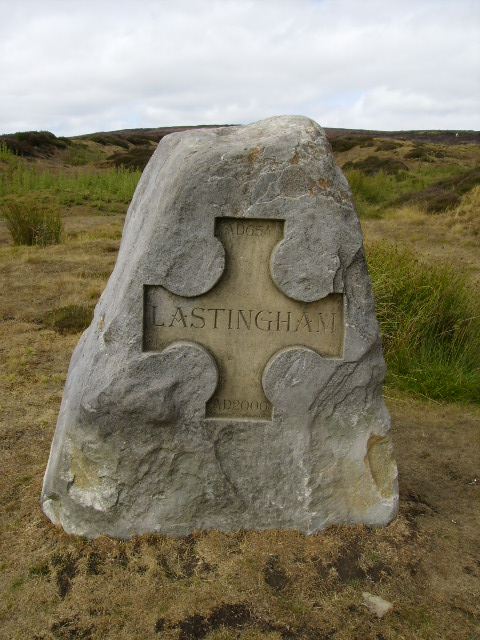
Stone cross at Lastingham, part of the millennium commemorations

- Cedd (620–664), saint
- Chad (634–672), saint
- Trumbert, scriptural tutor
- John Edward Hine, bishop
- John Jackson (1778–1831), painter
- Sydney Ringer, physician and originator of Ringer's Solution

== See also ==
- Listed buildings in Lastingham
