= St Cedd's Church, Ilford =

Church in East London, England

Coordinates: 51.5953°N 0.0526°E

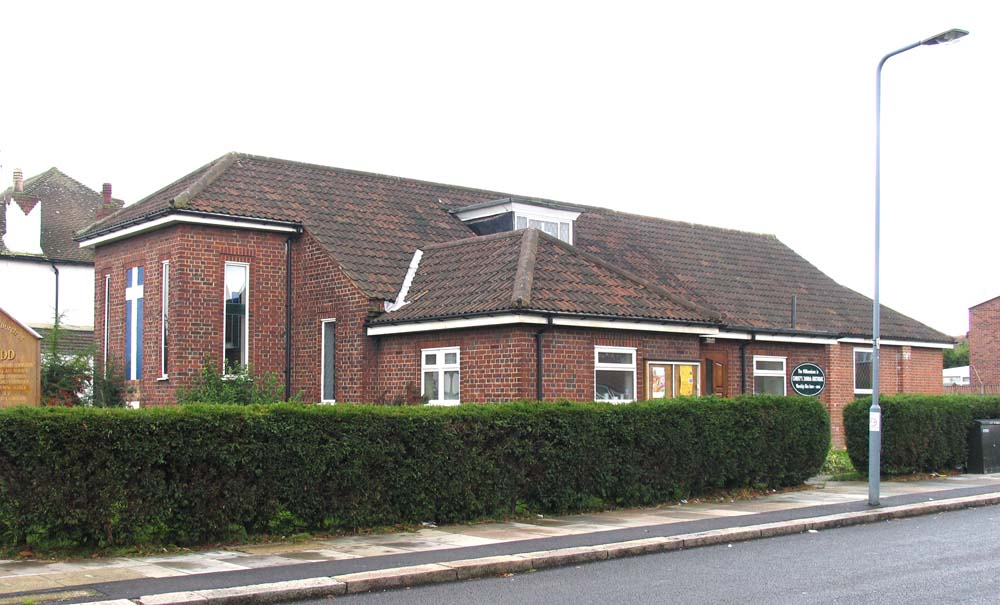
St Cedd's Church.

St Cedd's Church, Barkingside (also St Cedd's Church, Ilford and St Cedd's Church, Marston Road) is a Church of England parish church in the Barkingside district of Ilford in the London Borough of Redbridge, dedicated to Cedd, bishop of Essex, in which Ilford historically fell. In 1938 a temporary church was built and a conventional district set up using parts of the parishes of Holy Trinity, Barkingside and Holy Trinity, South Woodford.
