= Eata of Hexham =

Bishop of Lindisfarne and Hexham (died 686)

St Eata of Hexham
- Bishop of Hexham
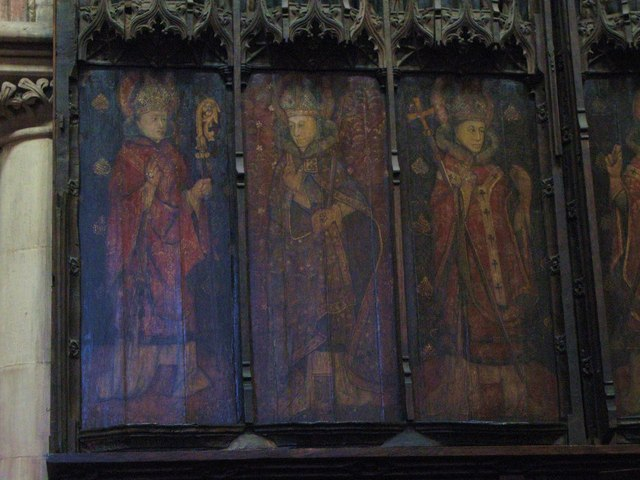
- Eata is depicted in the central image
- Appointed: 678
- Term ended: 681
- Predecessor: Trumbert
- Successor: John of Beverley
- Other posts: Bishop of Lindisfarne (682-685) of Bernicia (678-682); Abbot of Melrose

Personal details
- Died: 685 or 686 Hexham
- Denomination: Catholic

Sainthood
- Feast day: 26 October

Eata (died 26 October 686), also known as Eata of Lindisfarne, was Bishop of Hexham from 678 until 681, and of then Bishop of Lindisfarne from before 681 until 685. He then was translated back to Hexham where he served until his death in 685 or 686. He was the first native of Northumbria to occupy the bishopric of Lindisfarne.

== Life ==
Eata was originally taken to Lindisfarne as a boy under Aidan and trained as a monk. He was chosen as one of the 12 monks selected from Lindisfarne to found the new daughter monastery at Melrose. In 651 he was elected abbot of Melrose. Around 658 he left Melrose and founded a new monastery at Ripon in Yorkshire, taking with him the young St Cuthbert, who was his guest-master. In 661 King Alchfrith of Deira expelled Eata from Ripon, replacing him with Wilfrid as the new abbot. Eata returned to Melrose.

The historian Bede described Eata as a gentle and greatly revered man. As an administrator Eata applied his skills at the time of plague, civil disorders and major ecclesiastical change.

In 663 Alhfrith and Wilfrid persuaded King Oswiu to hold the Synod of Whitby to decide whether the local Church, English and Irish, would come into line with the traditions of the universal Church and would practice the Roman [aka Western] Rite of that Church, or would continue to diverge from it where it clashed with Irish traditions as practised in Northumbria. Thus it would decide whether Roman traditions, would take priority in Northumbria over matters such as the clerical tonsure and the date of Easter; the synod decided to accept the arguments of Wilfrid and the king for the universal Church traditions using the Roman Rite, to which Eata, unlike Colmán of Lindisfarne, acquiesced.

Before Whitby, the abbot of Lindisfarne was also the Bishop of Lindisfarne, after Whitby these two roles were divided. The old abbot, Colman, left Lindisfarne to go back to Iona with 30 English monks. Tuda was selected as the next Bishop of Lindisfarne and Eata moved from Melrose to become abbot of Lindisfarne. He appointed Cuthbert as prior at Lindisfarne.

In 678, the Archbishop of Canterbury, Theodore split the diocese of Northumbria into two new bishoprics. Eata became bishop of Bernicia. Bernicia had two episcopal sees, one at Hexham and the other at Lindisfarne. Eata was the bishop of the whole of Bernicia for three years, after which the see of Hexham was assigned to Trumbert, and Lindisfarne to Eata. After the death of Trumbert in 684, Cuthbert was elected Bishop of Hexham, but was reluctant to leave his hermitage on Inner Farne. Following his consecration at York on Easter 685, Cuthbert went to see Eata, who was at Melrose. Eata and Cuthbert exchanged sees shortly thereafter, and for the last year of his life Eata occupied Hexham. Eata died of dysentery at Hexham in 686, and was buried in the Benedictine Abbey of Hexham.

Like most of the early saints of the English Church, St. Eata was canonized by general repute of sanctity among the faithful in the regions which he helped to Christianize.

== Legacy ==
Eata is remembered in St. Eats' Chapel and St. Eata's Well, both in Alvie, on the south shore of Loch Alvie, in Scotland.

The only church dedicated to him in England is St Eata's Church at Atcham in Shropshire, where he is depicted in one of the stained glass windows.

== Citations ==
Christian titles
New diocese sub-divided from York	Bishop of Bernicia; 678–681	sub-divided into Lindisfarne and Hexham
New diocese sub-divided from Bernicia	Bishop of Lindisfarne; 681–685	Succeeded by Cuthbert
Preceded by Trumbert	Bishop of Hexham; 685–686	Succeeded by John of Beverley
