= Diuma =

7th-century Bishop of Mercia

- Bishop of Mercia
- Successor: Ceollach

Orders
- Consecration: after 655

Personal details
- Born: Ireland
- Died: late 650s Region known as in-feppingum, Kingdom of Mercia

Diuma (or Dwyna or Duma) was the first Bishop of Mercia in the Anglo-Saxon Kingdom of Mercia, during the Early Middle Ages.

All that is known of Diuma's life is contained in a short account in Bede's Ecclesiastical History of the English People.

Diuma was an Irishman, and was one of four priests, Cedd, Atta, Betti and Diuma, from the Kingdom of Northumbria, who accompanied the newly baptised Peada, son of Penda (King of Mercia) back to Mercia in 653. Peada became a Christian when he married Alhflaed, daughter of Oswiu, King of Northumbria. The priests were to introduce the Christian faith to the region.

After Penda's death, Diuma was consecrated a bishop by Finan. It is assumed that he established his see in Repton, but the exact boundaries of the bishopric are unclear. Bede claimed that he was bishop of both the Middle Angles and the Mercians.

Diuma was consecrated after 655 but his death date is unknown. It would appear to have been not long after this, as he was succeeded as bishop by Ceollach, whose own successor, Trumhere, was named bishop around 658. Bede refers to his episcopate as having been fruitful but short, after which he died in a place called in-feppingum in the territory of the Middle Angles. This place has never been definitely identified.

In 669 the seat of the diocese was moved by a successor, Chad, to Lichfield.

An early 11th-century list of resting places of the saints, lists a certain Dioma who rests at Charlbury near the river Windrush in Oxfordshire, suggesting the presence of a later Anglo-Saxon cult of Diuma.

== Citations ==
Christian titles
New diocese	Bishop of Mercia c. 656–c. 658	Succeeded by Ceollach
