= Cynibil =

Cynibil was one of four Northumbrian brothers named by Bede as prominent in the early Anglo-Saxon Church. The others were Chad of Mercia, Cedd and Caelin.

Bede comments on how unusual it would be for four brothers to become priests and two of them to reach the rank of bishop. Chad and Cedd were the two who became bishops, according to Bede. When Cedd undertook a forty-day fast to purify the site of their monastery at Lastingham, Cynibil took over the fast on the thirtieth day.
