= Ealhflæd =

7th-century Mercian queen and murderer

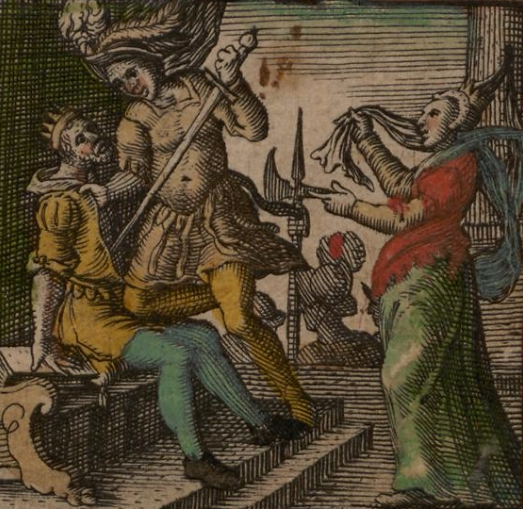
1611 John Speed illustration of Ealhflæd ordering the murder of Peada

Ealhflæd (also Alhflæd and Elfleda) was a 7th-century Mercian queen and the wife and murderer of Peada of Mercia.

Ealhflæd was the daughter of Oswiu of Northumbria. Her mother may have been Rhiaianfellt. According to Bede's Ecclesiastical History, the pagan Peada of Mercia asked for Ealhflæd's hand in marriage in the year 653, and Oswiu gave the condition that Peada and his kingdom should convert to Christianity first, which he did. Her brother Alhfrith, who was also Peada's brother-in-law through his sister Cyneburh, was instrumental in Peada's conversion.

Bede continues, "that Peada was the next spring [656 AD] very wickedly killed, by the treachery, as is said, of his wife, during the very time of celebrating Easter."The Anglo-Saxon Chronicle and Liber Eliensis also record that Peada was killed by the betrayal of his wife at Easter 656, although the wife's name is given only by Bede. Peada's father, Penda of Mercia, had been stain in the Battle of the Winwaed by Oswiu that previous winter.

It is believed that an image of Ealhflæd appears on the smaller of the two Sandbach Crosses.

== Sources ==
- Kirby, D.P. (1991). The Earliest English Kings. London; New York: Routledge. ISBN 978-0-415-24211-0.
