= Cedd =

Bishop of London and saint (c. 620 – 664)

- Bishop of London
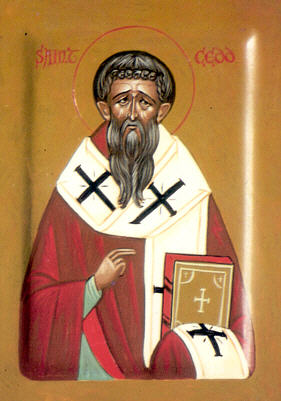
- Modern icon image of Cedd
- Installed: c. 654
- Term ended: 664
- Predecessor: Mellitus
- Successor: Wine

Personal details
- Born: c. 620 Kingdom of Northumbria
- Died: 26 October 664 Lastingham

Sainthood
- Feast day: 26 October, 7 January (Orthodox Church)
- Venerated in: Anglicanism; Roman Catholic Church; Eastern Orthodox Church;
- Title as Saint: Evangelist of the Middle Angles and East Saxons
- Attributes: Bishop holding a model of the church at Bradwell-on-Sea
- Patronage: Essex; Lastingham; interpreters
- Shrines: St Mary's Church, Lastingham. Shrine destroyed in Danish period but corresponding to the crypt of the present parish church.

Cedd (Latin: Cedda, Ceddus; c. 620 – 26 October 664) was an Anglo-Saxon monk and bishop from the Kingdom of Northumbria. He was an evangelist of the Middle Angles and East Saxons in England and a significant participant in the Synod of Whitby, a meeting which resolved important differences within the Church in England. He is venerated in Anglicanism, the Roman Catholic Church and the Orthodox Church.

== Background ==
The little that is known about Cedd comes to us mainly from the writing of Bede in his Ecclesiastical History of the English People. The following account is based entirely on Book 3 of Bede's History.

Cedd was born in the kingdom of Northumbria and brought up on the island of Lindisfarne by Aidan of the Irish Church. He had three brothers: Chad of Mercia (transcribed into Bede's Latin text as Ceadda), Cynibil and Cælin. All four were priests and both Cedd and Chad became bishops. Despite being of apparent Northumbrian birth, the names of all four brothers are British Celtic in origin, rather than Anglo-Saxon. The first datable reference to Cedd by Bede makes clear that he was a priest by the year 653. This probably pushes his birth date back to the early 620s. It is likely that Cedd was oldest of the brothers and was acknowledged the head of the family. He seems to have taken the lead, while Chad was his chosen successor.

Aidan had come to Northumbria from Iona, bringing with him a set of practices that are known as the Celtic Rite. As well as superficial differences over the Computus (calculation of the date of Easter), and the cut of the tonsure, these involved a pattern of Church organisation fundamentally different from the diocesan structure that was evolving on the continent of Europe. Activity was based in monasteries, which supported peripatetic missionary bishops. There was a strong emphasis on personal asceticism, on Biblical exegesis, and on eschatology. Aidan was well known for his personal austerity and disregard for the trappings of wealth and power. Bede several times stresses that Cedd and Chad absorbed his example and traditions. Bede tells us that Chad and many other Northumbrians went to study with the Irish after the death of Aidan (651).

Cedd is not mentioned as one of the wandering scholars. He is portrayed by Bede as very close to Aidan's successor, Finan. So it is highly likely that he owed his entire formation as a priest and scholar to Aidan and to Lindisfarne.

== Mission to Mercia ==
In 653, Cedd was sent by Oswiu of Northumberland with three other priests, Diuma, Atta, and Betti, to evangelise the Middle Angles, one of the core ethnic groups of Mercia, based in the mid-Trent Valley. Peada of Mercia, son of Penda, was sub-king of the Middle Angles. Peada had agreed to become a Christian in return for the hand of Oswiu's daughter, Alchflaed (c.635-c.714) in marriage. This was a time of growing Northumbrian power, as Oswiu reunited and consolidated the Northumbrian kingdom after its earlier (641/2) defeat by Penda. Peada travelled to Northumbria to negotiate his marriage and baptism.

Cedd, together with the priests, Adda, Betti and Diuma, accompanied Peada back to Middle Anglia, where they won numerous converts of all classes. Bede relates that the pagan Penda did not obstruct preaching even among his subjects in Mercia proper, and portrays him as generally sympathetic to Christianity at this point – a very different view from the general estimate of Penda as a devoted pagan. But, the mission apparently made little headway in the wider Mercian polity. Bede credits Cedd's brother Chad with the effective evangelisation of Mercia more than a decade later. To make progress among the general population, Christianity appeared to need positive royal backing, including grants of land for monasteries, rather than a benign attitude from leaders.

== Bishop of the East Saxons ==
Cedd was soon recalled from the mission to Mercia by Oswiu, who sent him on a mission with one other priest to the East Saxon kingdom. The priests had been requested by Sigeberht the Good to reconvert his people.

The East Saxon kingdom was originally converted by missionaries from Canterbury, where Augustine of Canterbury had established a Roman mission in 597. The first bishop of the Roman Rite was Mellitus, who arrived in Essex in 604. After a decade, he was driven out of the area. The religious destiny of the kingdom was constantly in the balance, with the royal family itself divided among Christians, pagans, and some wanting to tolerate both.

Bede tells us that Sigeberht's decision to be baptised and to reconvert his kingdom was at the initiative of Oswiu. Sigeberht travelled to Northumbria to accept baptism from Bishop Finan of Lindisfarne. Cedd went to the East Saxons partly as an emissary of the Northumbrian monarchy. Certainly his prospects were helped by the continuing military and political success of Northumbria, especially the final defeat of Penda in 655. Practically, Northumbria gained hegemony among the Anglo-Saxon kingdoms.

After making some conversions, Cedd returned to Lindisfarne to report to Finan. In recognition of his success, Finan ordained him bishop, calling in two other Irish bishops to assist at the rite. Cedd was appointed bishop of the East Saxons. As a result, he is generally listed among the bishops of London, then part of the East Saxon kingdom. Bede, however, generally uses ethnic descriptions for episcopal responsibilities when dealing with the generation of Cedd and Chad.

Bede's record makes clear that Cedd demanded personal commitment and that he was unafraid to confront the powerful. He excommunicated a thegn who was in an unlawful marriage and forbade Christians to accept the man's hospitality. According to Bede, when Sigeberht continued to visit the man's home, Cedd went to the house to denounce the king, foretelling that he would die in that house. Bede asserts that the King's subsequent murder (660) was his penance for defying Cedd's injunction.

After the death of Sigeberht, there were signs that Cedd had a more precarious position. The new king, Swithhelm of Essex, who had assassinated Sigeberht, was a pagan. He had long been a client of Æthelwold of East Anglia, who was increasingly dependent on Wulfhere of Mercia, the Christian king of a newly resurgent Mercia. After some persuasion from Æthelwold, Swithelm accepted baptism from Cedd. The bishop travelled into East Anglia to baptise the king at Æthelwold's home. For a time, the East Saxon kingdom remained Christian.

Bede presents Cedd's work as decisive in the conversion of the East Saxons, although it was preceded by other missionaries, and eventually followed by a revival of paganism. Despite the substantial work, the future suggested that all could be undone.

== Monastic foundations ==
Cedd founded many churches. He also founded monasteries at Tilaburg (probably East Tilbury, but possibly West Tilbury) and Ithancester (almost certainly Bradwell-on-Sea). These locations are all in the modern county of Essex.

Cedd was appointed as abbot of the monastery of Lastingham in his native Northumbria at the request of the sub-king Œthelwald of Deira. Bede records the foundation of this monastery in some detail, showing that Œthelwald was put in contact with Cedd through Caelin, one of the bishop's brothers, who was on the king's staff. Cedd undertook a 40-day fast to purify the site, although urgent royal business took him away after 30 days, and Cynibil took over the fast for him.

Cedd occupied the position of abbot of Lastingham to the end of his life, while maintaining his position as missionary bishop and diplomat. He often travelled far from the monastery in fulfillment of these other duties. His brother Chad, who succeeded him as abbot, did the same. Cedd and his brothers regarded Lastingham as a monastic base, providing intellectual and spiritual support, and a place of retreat. Cedd delegated daily care of Lastingham to other priests, and it is likely that Chad operated similarly.

== Final years ==
Cedd had been brought up in the Celtic Rite, which differed from the Roman Rite in the dating of the religious calendar and other practices, including the tonsure of monks. Supporters of each rite met at a council within the Northumbrian kingdom known as the Synod of Whitby. The proceedings of the council were hampered by the participants' mutual incomprehension of each other's languages, which probably included Old Irish, Old English, Frankish and Old Welsh, as well as Latin. Bede recounted that Cedd interpreted for both sides. Cedd's facility with the languages, together with his status as a trusted royal emissary, likely made him a key figure in the negotiations. His skills were seen as an eschatological sign of the presence of the Holy Spirit, in contrast to the Biblical account of the Tower of Babel. When the council ended, Cedd returned to Essex.

According to Bede, Cedd accepted the Roman dating of the observance of Easter. He returned to his work as bishop, abandoning the practices of the Irish of Dál Riata.

A short time later, he returned to Northumbria and the monastery at Lastingham. He fell ill with the plague and died on 26 October 664. Bede records that immediately after Cedd's death a party of thirty monks travelled up from Essex to Lastingham to do homage. All but one small boy died there, also of the plague. Cedd was initially buried at Lastingham in a grave. Later, when a stone church was built, his body was moved and re-interred in a shrine inside the church of the monastery. Chad succeeded his brother as abbot at Lastingham.

King Swithhelm of Essex died at about the same time as Cedd. He was succeeded by the joint kings Sighere and Sæbbi. Some people reverted to paganism, which Bede said was due to the effects of the plague. Mercia under King Wulfhere was the dominant force south of the Humber, so it fell to Wulfhere to take prompt action. He dispatched Bishop Jaruman to take over Cedd's work among the East Saxons. Jaruman, working (according to Bede) with great discretion, toured Essex, negotiated with local magnates, and soon restored Christianity.

== Commemorations ==
Cedd is remembered in the Church of England with a commemoration on 26 October, the anniversary of his death. In the Anglican and Catholic traditions, the liturgical colour for St Cedd's Day (in common with other non-martyred saints) is white, meaning that the church is decorated with white hangings and the clergy wear white vestments. St Cedd's Day is also known as Essex Day.

The Diocese of Chelmsford celebrated 1954, the 13th centenary of Cedd's mission to Essex, as St Cedd's Year. In that year, Chelmsford Cathedral, already dedicated to St Mary the Virgin was additionally dedicated to St Cedd and St Peter (to whom Cedd's chapel at Bradwell is dedicated) while events in his honour included a rally at West Ham United's Boleyn Ground.

The site of an ancient tree in Polstead, Suffolk, known as the Gospel Oak, is one of a number of sites where Cedd is traditionally supposed to have preached. The original tree collapsed in 1953, but its remains can still be seen among its successor trees, and a church service is held there on the first Sunday of every August.

The town Chediston, is named after Saint Cedd.

== Background Reading ==
- Bassett, Steven, Ed. The Origins of the Anglo-Saxon Kingdoms. Leicester University Press, 1989. ISBN 978-0-7185-1367-2. Studies on state formation that provide important political background to the conversion.
- Fletcher, Richard. The Conversion of Europe: From Paganism to Christianity 371-1386. . HarperCollins, 1997. ISBN 0-00-255203-5. Places the conversion of the Anglo-Saxons in the widest possible context, and places Cedd's family incidentally but tellingly within the author's overall interpretation.
- Mayr-Harting, Henry. The Coming of Christianity to Anglo-Saxon England. 1991. Pennsylvania State University Press. ISBN 978-0-271-00769-4. Cedd and Chad are strongly featured in this widely recommended narrative account of the conversion, much revised since its first publication in 1972, and giving a clear picture of the political and cultural context.
- Cave, Diana . St Cedd: Seventh-century Celtic saint. The first biography of this priest. PublishNation, London 2015. ISBN 978-1-326-29593-6

Catholic Church titles
Preceded by Mellitus	Bishop of London; 654–664	Succeeded by Wine
