= Gilling Abbey =

Medieval monastery in Yorkshire

Gilling Abbey was a medieval Anglo-Saxon monastery established in Yorkshire, England.

It was founded at Gilling in what is currently North Yorkshire by Queen Eanflæd, the wife of King Oswiu of Northumbria, who persuaded her husband to found it at the site where Oswiu had killed a rival and kinsman, King Oswine of Deira. Oswine died around 651 or 652. Eanflæd forced her husband to found the monastery in order to atone for Oswine's death, since Eanflæd was Oswine's second cousin. Under the laws of the time, the only way Eanflæd could take revenge for her cousin's death was to kill her husband or accept a substantial gift known as a weregild. The abbey was built on that weregild. Eanflæd also requested that the first abbot be a kinsman of Oswine. By founding the monastery shortly after Oswine's death, Oswiu and Eanflæd avoided the creation of a feud.

The monastery canonized Oswine as a saint, joining the ranks of several murdered Anglo-Saxon kings who were regarded as saints.

The first abbot of the monastery was a relative of Oswine's named Trumhere. The second abbot was Cynefrith, who later left the abbey and went to Ireland. Another early abbot was Trumbert, who either became Bishop of Hexham after being abbot, or was abbot after being deposed as bishop. Gilling may be identical with the monastery of Ingetlingum, which had close ties to the monastery at Ripon, which was held by Wilfrid. Gilling became depopulated from the plague, sometime before 669. Because of this, one of the monks there, Ceolfrith, brother of Cynefrith, went to Ripon. Ceolfrith later went to Wearmouth-Jarrow, where he became abbot. It is unknown whether the depopulation of the monastery from the plague meant the end of the religious community at Gilling, or if it continued to exist after that.

The abbey's location has traditionally held to have been in or near Gilling West, Yorkshire. An alternative location of Gilling East, Yorkshire has been proposed by historians Richard Morris and Ian Wood.

== Sources ==
- Blair, John P. (2005). The Church in Anglo-Saxon Society. Oxford, UK: Oxford University Press. ISBN 978-0-19-921117-3.
- Blair, Peter Hunter (1990). The World of Bede (Reprint of 1970 ed.). Cambridge, UK: Cambridge University Press. ISBN 978-0-521-39819-0.
- Kirby, D. P. (2000). The Earliest English Kings. New York: Routledge. ISBN 978-0-415-24211-0.
- Kiby, D. P. (1974). "Northumbria in the Time of Wilfrid". In Kirby, D. P. (ed.). Saint Wilfrid at Hexham. Newcastle upon Tyne, UK: Oriel Press. pp. 1–34. ISBN 978-0-85362-155-3.
- Mayr-Harting, Henry (1991). The Coming of Christianity to Anglo-Saxon England. University Park, PA: Pennsylvania State University Press. ISBN 978-0-271-00769-4.
- Pickles, Thomas (September 2009). "Locating Ingetlingum and Suthgedling: Gilling West and Gilling East". Northern History. XLVI (2): 313–325. doi:10.1179/174587009X452369. hdl:10034/601439.
- Roper, Michael (1974). "Wilfrid's Landholdings in Northumbria". In Kirby, D. P. (ed.). Saint Wilfrid at Hexham. Newcastle upon Tyne, UK: Oriel Press. pp. 61–79. ISBN 978-0-85362-155-3.
- Yorke, Barbara (2006). The Conversion of Britain: Religion, Politics and Society in Britain c. 600–800. London: Pearson/Longman. ISBN 978-0-582-77292-2.
- Yorke, Barbara (1997). Kings and Kingdoms of Early Anglo-Saxon England. New York: Routledge. ISBN 978-0-415-16639-3.
