= Trumhere =

7th-century Bishop of Mercia

- Bishop of Mercia
- Appointed: c. 658
- Term ended: c. 662
- Predecessor: Ceollach
- Successor: Jaruman
- Other post: Abbot of Gilling Abbey

Orders
- Consecration: c. 658

Personal details
- Died: c. 662

Trumhere (or Thumhere; died c. 662) was a medieval Bishop of Mercia.

Trumhere probably was consecrated about 658 and died about 662. He was born in England but was educated in Ireland. He was the first abbot of Gilling Abbey, which had been founded on land donated by King Oswiu of Northumbria as penance for the death of King Oswine of Deira. Trumhere was related to both Oswine and Queen Eanfled, wife of Oswiu and who was the actual founder of the monastery. When Trumhere was elected as a bishop, he was consecrated by a Celtic bishop.

== Citations ==
Christian titles
| Preceded by Ceollach | Bishop of Mercia c. 658 – c. 662 | Succeeded by Jaruman |
