= Tuda of Lindisfarne =

7th-century Bishop of Lindisfarne and saint

- Bishop of Lindisfarne
- Appointed: 664
- Term ended: 664
- Predecessor: Colmán
- Successor: Eata of Hexham

Personal details
- Died: 664
- Denomination: Christian

Sainthood
- Feast day: 21 October

Tuda of Lindisfarne (died 664), also known as Saint Tuda, was appointed to succeed Colman as Bishop of Lindisfarne. He served for less than a year. Although raised in Ireland, he was a staunch supporter of Roman practices, being tonsured in the Roman manner and celebrating Easter according to the Roman Computus. However, he was consecrated as bishop in Ireland.

== Life ==
Upon Colman's departure from Lindisfarne, he requested the king to appoint Abbot Eata of Melrose Abbey as his successor as Abbot of Lindisfarne. Tuda was appointed bishop of the Northumbrians. Tuda had been educated in the south of Ireland.

Tuda became bishop in 664 and died in that same year. The Anglo-Saxon Chronicle (in its entry for 656) includes a 664 charter for the minster of Medhamsted, or Peter-borough, which lists Tuda as among the consecrators.

The same Chronicle for the year 664 records that Tuda was one of many who died in the plague of that year.

Tuda's feast day is 21 October.

== Citations ==
Christian titles
Preceded by Colmán	Bishop of Lindisfarne; 664	Vacant Title next held by Eata of Hexham
