= Alhfrith =

Anglo-Saxon king (c. 630–c. 664)

King of Deira
- Reign: 655–664 AD
- Predecessor: Æthelwold
- Successor: Ecgfrith
- Born: c. 630
- Died: c. 664
- Consort: Cyneburh
- Issue: Rumwold?
- Father: Oswiu
- Mother: Rieinmelth

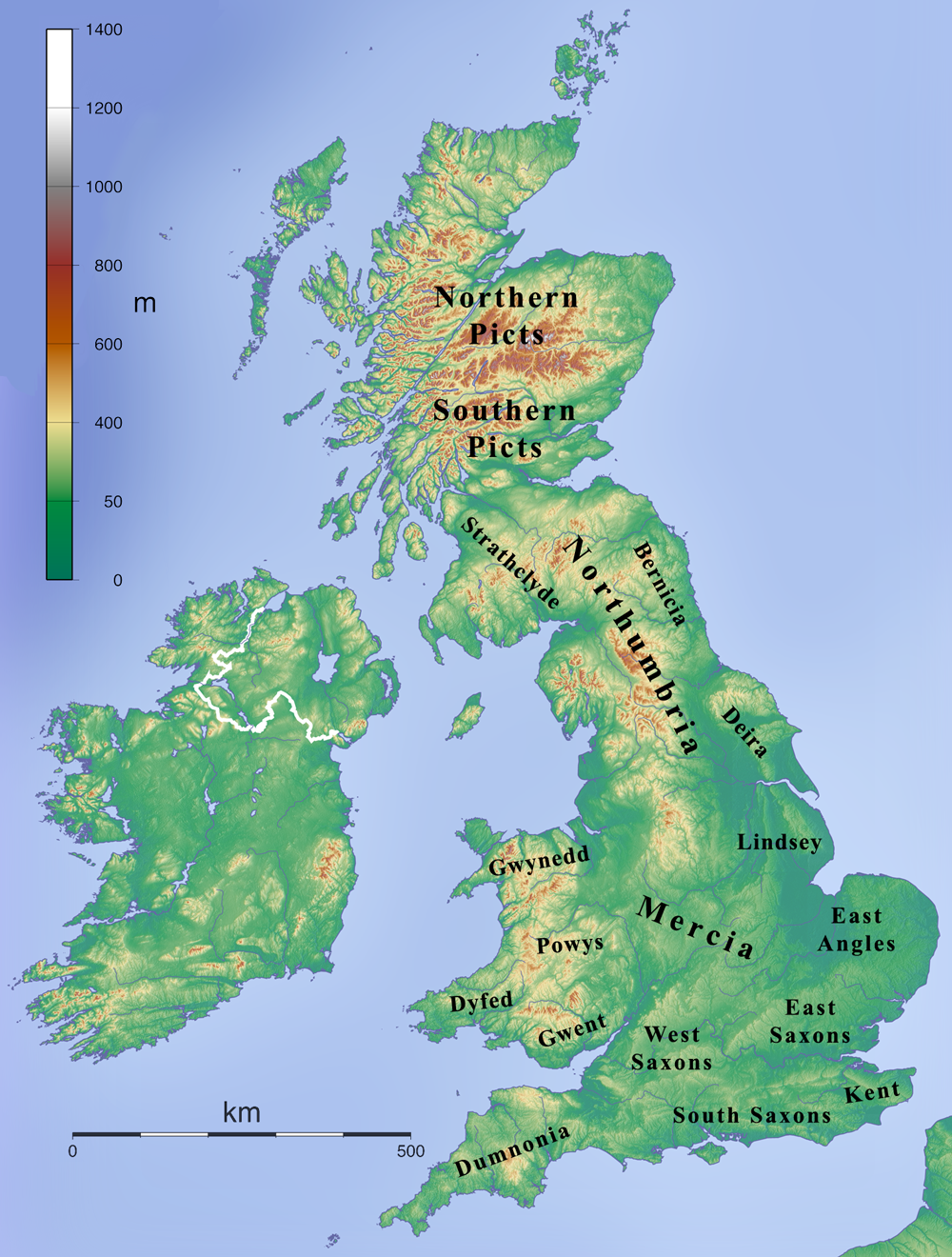
Map depicting the British Islands during the 7th century.

Alhfrith or Ealhfrith (c. 630 – c. 664) was King of Deira under his father Oswiu, King of Bernicia, from 655 until sometime after 664. Appointed by Oswiu as a subordinate ruler, Alhfrith apparently clashed with his father over religious policy, which came to a head at the Synod of Whitby in 664. After this, Alhfrith disappears from the historical record.

== Life ==
Alhfrith was the oldest son of Oswiu, who became King of Bernicia in 642. His mother was Oswiu's first wife, Rieinmelth, granddaughter of king Rhun of Rheged; the marriage also produced a daughter, Alhflaed. Both children were likely born in the 630s. In the early 650s, when Alhfrith was a young man, Oswiu had him married to Cyneburh, daughter of Oswiu's great rival Penda of Mercia. Shortly after, Alhflaed married Penda's son Peada. Alhflaed, a devout Christian, urged Peada to convert.

Relations between Oswiu and Penda remained contentious, and Penda invaded Bernicia with a large army in 655. One of Penda's allies was Œthelwald, king of Deira and Oswiu's nephew; Oswiu considered Deira part of his realm and Œthelwald his sub-king, but resistance to his rule continued throughout his reign. Alhfrith served in his father's significantly smaller army as they pursued Penda. Their forces caught Penda's at the Battle of the Winwaed; Œthelwald and others withdrew their troops at a critical moment, which contributed to Oswiu winning a decisive victory in which Penda was killed.

The victory enabled Oswiu to re-establish his control over Deira. He evidently removed Œthelwald and installed Alhfrith as under-king (a largely autonomous ruler) owing homage to him. However, Deiran resistance to Oswiu's rule continued under Alhfrith, who might have tried to use it to assert his independence. Alhfrith initially followed his father in adhering to Celtic Christianity, which practised certain customs at odds with those endorsed by the Bishop of Canterbury and Continental Europe. However, he soon began challenging his father's policies of preferring the Celtic practices. Around 658, Alhfrith's ally Cenwalh introduced him to Wilfrid, a Northumbrian churchman who had studied in Europe and strongly advocated the Roman customs. Subsequently, he began openly challenging the Celtic customs and his father's policies. In 664, Oswiu convened the Synod of Whitby to determine which form of Christianity Northumbria would follow; Alhfrith served as a key proponent of Wilfrid and the Roman system, which ultimately prevailed.

Alhfrith requested that Wilfrid be made bishop for Deira, most likely with a see at York. Apparently with Oswiu's consent, Wilfrid travelled to Gaul to be consecrated, as he did not consider any bishops in Great Britain or Ireland to be validly consecrated; he did not return until around 666. In the mid-660s, Alhfrith requested to go on pilgrimage to Rome with Benedict Biscop, which Oswiu forbade. Alhfrith subsequently vanishes from the historical record. In the Ecclesiastical History of the English People, Bede mentions that Alhfrith "attacked" his father. David Kirby suggests that Alhfrith may have participated and died in a rebellion against Oswiu, perhaps inspired by their continuing religious differences, Alhfrith's anxieties about the rise of his half-brother Ecgfrith, or Oswiu's military aspirations to the north that shifted focus away from Deira in the south.

According to later tradition, Oswiu replaced Alhfrith as King of Deira with his brother Ecgfrith, who subsequently became king of Bernicia and installed another brother, Ælfwine, in Deira. It is not clear if Alhfrith had children; it is possible that the later Northumbrian king Osric was his son, though he might instead have been the son of Aldfrith.

The land on which Ripon Cathedral is now built is said to have been given to Wilfrid by Alhfrith.
