= Trumbert =

7th-century Bishop of Hexham

- Bishop of Hexham
- Church: Christian
- See: Diocese of Hexham
- Appointed: 681
- Term ended: 684
- Predecessor: New Post
- Successor: Eata

Trumbert (or Tunberht or Tunbeorht) was a monk of Jarrow, a disciple of Chad and later Bishop of Hexham.

== Life ==
Trumbert was educated at Lastingham by Chad, and was a teacher of Bede. He was the bishop of the see of Hexham from 681 until he was deposed in 684 and was succeeded by Eata. He had previously been a monk at Ripon under Wilfrid. After his deposition, he became abbot at Gilling Abbey in north Yorkshire. He was the brother of Ceolfrith, who was abbot of Jarrow while Bede was a monk at Jarrow.

== Trumbert Shaft ==
The Trumbert Shaft is part of an inscribed sandstone grave cross found in the parish of Yarm, North Yorkshire in 1877. It bears the inscriptions in Latin and Old English:

+ [orate] PRO [tru]MBERENCT + SAC+ ALLA +
SIGNUM AEFTER HIS BREODERA YSETAE

Which translates as:

Pray for Trumberhet, Bishop
Alla set up this memorial to his brother

The shaft now resides in the library of Durham Cathedral and it is assumed that Trumbert is buried within the churchyard of Yarm Parish Church.

== Notes ==
Christian titles
Preceded by Eata	Bishop of Hexham; 681–684	Succeeded by Eata
