= Ceollach =

7th-century Bishop of Mercia

- Bishop of Mercia
- Predecessor: Diuma
- Successor: Trumhere

Ceollach (or Cellach) was a medieval Bishop of Mercia. His consecration dates and death dates are unknown. He was Irish by birth and was trained in Ireland. Before his death, he left or resigned his see and went to the monastery of Iona.

== Citations ==
Christian titles
Preceded by Diuma	Bishop of Mercia c. 670	Succeeded by Trumhere
