= Oswine of Deira =

English monarch and Christian saint (died 651)

Saint Oswine of Deira
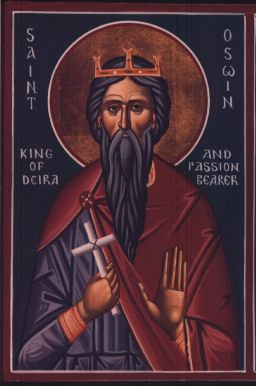

King, Martyr
- Born: Unknown
- Died: 20 August, 651; Gilling, Yorkshire, England
- Venerated in: Catholicism, Eastern Orthodoxy, Anglican Communion
- Major shrine: Tynemouth, England
- Feast: 20 August

Oswine, Oswin or Osuine (died 20 August 651) was a King of Deira in northern England.

== Life ==
Oswine succeeded King Oswald of Northumbria, probably around the year 644, after Oswald's death at the Battle of Maserfield. Oswine was the son of Osric. His succession, perhaps the choice of the people of Deira, split the Kingdom of Northumbria. Oswiu was the successor of Bernicia to the north.

After seven years of peaceful rule, Oswiu declared war on Oswine. Oswine refused to engage in battle, instead retreating to Gilling and the home of his friend, Earl Humwald. Humwald betrayed Oswine, delivering him to Oswiu's soldiers by whom Oswine was put to death, probably at Diddersley Hill in North Yorkshire.

Bede recounted the death of King Oswine in 651 and mentioned a place called "Wilfaresdun," which he explained to mean "Wilfar's Hill". According to Bede, this location was located approximately ten miles away from the village called Cataract, towards the northwest. King Oswin sought refuge in the house of Earl Hunwald, whom he believed to be his loyal friend, along with only one trusted soldier named Tonhere. However, Earl Hunwald betrayed him, and King Oswin was ultimately killed by Ethilwin, Oswy's commander, in a treacherous manner" Bede provides us with the following account of the events:

Remisit exercitum quem congregaverat, ac singulos domum redire praecepit, a loco qui vocatur Vilfaraesdun, id est Mons Vilfari, et set a vico Cataractone decem ferme millibus passum contra solistitialem occasum secretus: divertitque ipse cum uno tantum milite sibi fidelissimo, nomine Tondheri, celandus in domo comitis Hunualdi, quem etiam ipsum sibi amicissimum autumabat. Sed, heu, proh dolor! longe aliter erat: nam ab eodem comite proditum eum Osuiu, eum praefato ipsius milite per praefectum suum Ediluinum detestanda omnibus morte interfecit. Quod factum est die decima tertia Kalendarum Septembrium, anno regni eius nono, in loco qui dicitur Ingetlingum.

Understanding this to describe a prominent hill located ten Roman miles (i.e. about 9 imperial miles along the old Roman road) northwest of Catterick, then we are left with one possible location for Wilfar's Hill: Diddersley Hill.

== Veneration ==
In Anglo-Saxon culture, it was assumed that the nearest kinsmen to a murdered person would seek to avenge the death or require some other kind of justice on account of it (such as the payment of wergild: a sum of money paid to the relatives of a slain man on account of the killing). However, Oswine's nearest kinsman was Oswiu's own wife. Oswiu was also related to the slain. In order to confront the justice that was seen to be owed for the murder, Oswiu founded Gilling Abbey, a monastery partly staffed by the relatives of both of their families, and this monastery was given the task of offering prayers for both Oswiu's salvation and Oswine's departed soul. It was from the same monastery, many years later, that Oswine was later claimed to be a saint.

Oswine is one of many Anglo-Saxon royals who were honoured in monasteries and developed cults as saints. Another example is Edward the Martyr.

Oswine was buried at Tynemouth, but the place of burial was later forgotten. It is said that his burial place was made known by an apparition to a monk named Edmund, and his relics were translated to an honorable place in Tynemouth Priory in 1065. According to Alban Butler, in 1103, Ranulf Flambard, Bishop of Durham, translated the remains from the chapel at Tynemouth, which had fallen into disrepair, to St Alban's Abbey in Hertfordshire.

There was a cult of Saint Oswin as a Christian martyr because he had died "if not for the faith of Christ, at least for the justice of Christ" as stated by a homilist in the 12th Century.

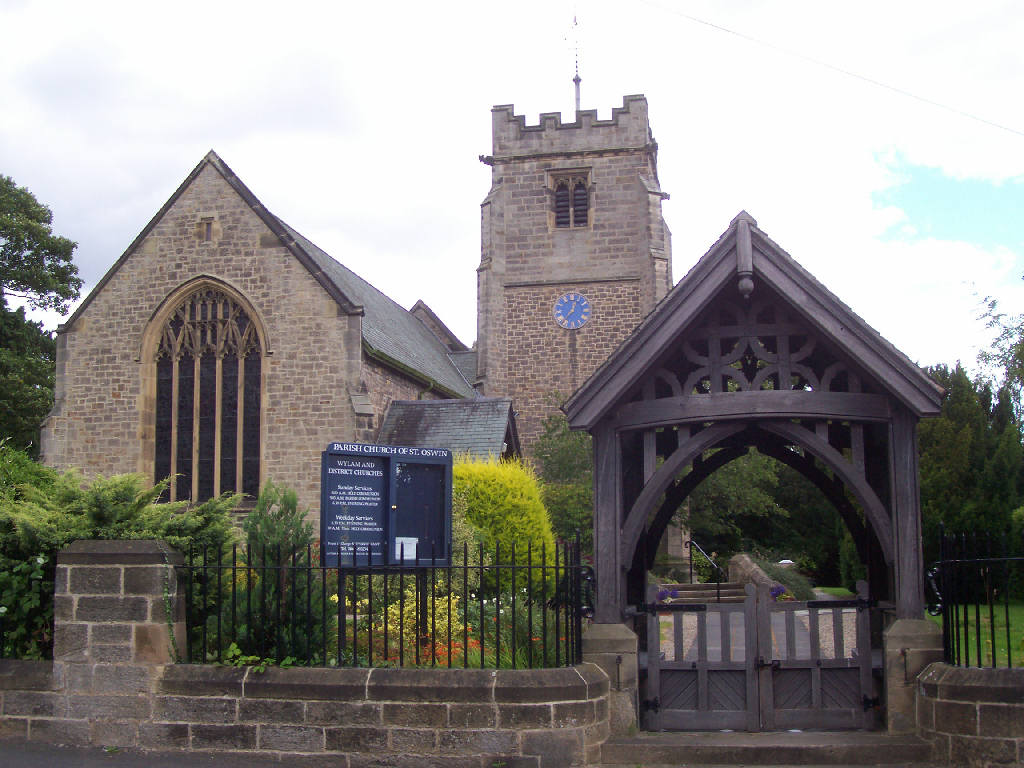
St Oswin's, Wylam, Northumberland

== St Oswin's Church, Wylam ==
The Church of England parish church of Wylam, Northumberland, England is dedicated to Saint Oswin. The church was built in 1886 and currently has a congregation of about 150. The church has a peal of 6 bells (in the tower) and has regular Sunday services with ringing.

== Our Lady & St Oswin's Church, Tynemouth ==
St Oswin is co-patron (with Our Lady) of the Catholic parish of Tynemouth with a church at the end of Front Street not far from the ruins of the priory where Oswin was buried.

== Sources ==
- Bede, Historia Ecclesiastica gentis Anglorum, ed. and tr. B. Colgrave and R.A.B. Mynors, Bede’s Ecclesiastical History of the English People. Oxford, 1969.
- Anonymous, Vita Oswini (twelfth century), ed. James Raine, Miscellanea Biographica. Publications of the Surtees Society 8. London, 1858. 1-59. PDF available from Internet Archive.
