= Jaruman =

7th-century Bishop of Mercia

- Bishop of Mercia
- Elected: 662
- Term ended: 669
- Predecessor: Trumhere
- Successor: Chad of Mercia

Personal details
- Died: 669

Jaruman (or Jarumann; died 669) was the fourth Bishop of Mercia. He fought against apostasy outside his diocese. He served as bishop in the time of King Wulfhere of Mercia, on whose behalf he undertook several missions to Saxon tribes which had returned to paganism. He probably originated in Ireland but was educated at Lindisfarne.

Some Tolkien scholars suggest that Jaruman's name was the inspiration for that of Saruman in The Lord of the Rings.

== Citations ==
Christian titles
Preceded by Thumere	Bishop of Mercia; 662–669	Succeeded by Chad of Mercia as Bishop of the Mercians and Lindsey People
