= Œthelwald of Deira =

Œthelwald

King of Deira
- Reign: 651–655 AD
- Predecessor: Oswine
- Successor: Alchfrith
- Born: c. 625
- Died: After 655 AD
- House: Deira
- Father: Oswald

Œthelwald was a King of Deira (651–c. 655). He was the son of King Oswald of Northumbria, who was killed at the Battle of Maserfield in 642.

After Oswine of Deira was killed by Oswiu of Bernicia in 651, Œthelwald became king; it is uncertain whether Oswiu (who was Œthelwald's uncle) installed him as king or whether Œthelwald took the kingship in opposition to Oswiu. He subsequently allied himself with Oswiu's enemy, Penda of Mercia, and assisted Penda during his invasion of Northumbria in 655. However, when the armies of Oswiu and Penda met on 15 November at the Battle of the Winwaed, Œthelwald withdrew his forces. Penda was defeated and killed, perhaps in part because of this desertion, and afterward Œthelwald seems to have lost Deira to Alchfrith, who was installed there by the victorious Oswiu.

Œthelwald's fate is unknown, as nothing is formally recorded of him after the battle. Local tradition, however, held that he became a hermit in Kirkdale, North Yorkshire.

Although he allied himself with the pagan Penda, Œthelwald was a pious Christian and was remembered for his generosity towards St. Cedd, to whom he granted land for a monastery.
