= Oswiu =

King of Bernicia (r. 642–670) and of Northumbria (r. 654–670)

King of Northumbria
- Reign: 642–670
- Predecessor: Oswald
- Successor: Ecgfrith

King of Mercia
- Reign: 655 or 656–658
- Predecessor: Peada
- Successor: Wulfhere of Mercia
- Born: c. 612
- Died: 15 February 670 (aged 57–58)
- Burial: Whitby Abbey
- Spouse: Eanflæd; Fín; Rieinmelth
- Issue: Ealhfrith; Ecgfrith; Ælfwine; Aldfrith; Ealhflæd; Ælfflæd; Osthryth
- Father: Æthelfrith
- Mother: Acha of Deira
- Religion: Christianity

Oswiu, also known as Oswy or Oswig (Old English: Ōswīg; c. 612 – 15 February 670), was King of Bernicia from 642 and of Northumbria from 654 until his death. He is notable for his role at the Synod of Whitby in 664, which ultimately brought the church in Northumbria into conformity with the wider Catholic Church.

One of the sons of Æthelfrith of Bernicia and Acha of Deira, Oswiu became king following the death of his brother Oswald in 642. Unlike Oswald, Oswiu struggled to exert authority over Deira, the other constituent kingdom of medieval Northumbria, for much of his reign.

Oswiu and his brothers were raised in exile in the Irish kingdom of Dál Riata in present-day Scotland after their father's death at the hands of Edwin of Northumbria (not by Edwin but possibly by Rædwald and his son Rægenhere at the Battle of the River Idle) only returning after Edwin's death in 633. Oswiu rose to the kingship when his brother Oswald was killed in battle against Penda of Mercia. The early part of his reign was defined by struggles to assert control over Deira and his contentious relationship with Penda, his overlord. In 655, Oswiu's forces killed Penda in a decisive victory at the Battle of the Winwaed, establishing Oswiu as one of the most powerful rulers in Britain. He secured control of Deira, with his son Alhfrith serving as a sub-king, and for three years, Oswiu's power extended over Mercia, earning him recognition as bretwalda over much of Great Britain.

Oswiu was a devoted Christian, promoting the faith among his subjects and establishing a number of monasteries, including Gilling Abbey and Whitby Abbey. He was raised in the Celtic Christian tradition of much of the Irish world, rather than the Roman tradition practiced by the southern Anglo-Saxon kingdoms as well as some members of the Deiran nobility, including Oswiu's queen Eanflæd. In 664, Oswiu presided over the Synod of Whitby, where clerics debated over the two traditions, and helped resolve tension between the parties by decreeing that Northumbria would follow the Roman style. Oswiu died in 670 and was succeeded by his son, Ecgfrith. His feast is 15 February in the East and in the West.

== Background and early life ==
Anglo-Saxon kingdoms of the early 7th century

Oswiu was born circa 612, as he was 58 at his death in 670, according to Bede. He was the third child of Æthelfrith, then King of Bernicia; his siblings included older brothers Eanfrith and Oswald and sister Æbbe. Oswiu's mother was likely Æthelfrith's only recorded wife, Acha, a princess of Deira's royal line who is known to have been Oswald's mother. Regardless, his heritage did nothing to endear him to the Deiran nobility; while they accepted Oswald as king apparently on account of his mother, they resisted Oswiu throughout his reign.

At the time of Oswiu's birth, Æthelfrith was at the height of his power. In 604 he had taken control of Deira, evidently by conquest; he killed the previous king (apparently Æthelric), married Acha, a member of the kingly line, and exiled Acha's brother Edwin. His authority ran from the lands of the Picts and the Dál Riata in modern Scotland to Wales and the Midlands in the south. Æthelfrith's power rested on his military success, and this success came to an end in 616, when the exiled Edwin of Northumbria with the support of King Rædwald, defeated and killed him in the battle of the River Idle.

On Æthelfrith's death, his sons and their supporters fled Northumbria, finding sanctuary among the Gaels and Picts of northern Britain and Ireland. Here they would remain until Edwin's death at the Battle of Hatfield Chase in 633.

In exile, the sons of Æthelfrith were converted to Christianity, or raised as Christians. In Oswiu's case, he became an exile at the age of four, and cannot have returned to Northumbria until aged twenty-one, spending childhood and adolescence in a Gaelic milieu. Bede writes that Oswiu was fluent in the Old Irish language and Irish in his faith.

As well as learning the Irish language and being thoroughly Christianised, Oswiu may have fought for his Gaelic hosts, perhaps receiving his arms—a significant event—from a King of Dál Riata, such as Eochaid Buide, son of that Áedán mac Gabráin whom his father had defeated at the Battle of Degsastan. The Irish annals name one Oisiric mac Albruit, rigdomna Saxan—ætheling Osric—among the dead, alongside Connad Cerr, King of Dál Riata, and others of the Cenél nGabráin, at the Battle of Fid Eóin. Whether Oswiu's marriage with the Uí Néill princess Fín of the Cenél nEógain, and the birth of Aldfrith, should be placed in the context of his exile, or took place at a later date is uncertain.

Equally uncertain is the date of Oswiu's return to Northumbria. He may have returned with his brother Eanfrith on Edwin's death in 633, as Bede appears to write. Eanfrith apostatised and was killed by Cadwallon ap Cadfan, who was defeated and killed in turn by another brother, Oswald, who became king of Bernicia and probably succeeded to his father's old dominance of northern and central Britain.

== Eanflæd and Oswine ==
Oswald died in battle against Penda of Mercia at the Battle of Maserfield, dated by Bede to 5 August 642. Oswald's son Œthelwald may have been his preferred successor, but Œthelwald cannot have been an adult in 642. So, the kingship came to Oswiu. Unlike Eanfrith and Osric, Oswiu held to the Christian faith in spite of his brother's defeat by the pagan Penda. This may have been due to his more thoroughly Christian upbringing, but the influence of Bishop Aidan of Lindisfarne, by then a major figure in Bernicia, could also have been significant.

Bede summarises Oswiu's reign in this way:

Oswald being translated to the heavenly kingdom, his brother Oswy, a young man of about thirty years of age, succeeded him on the throne of his earthly kingdom, and held it twenty-eight years with much trouble, being harassed by the pagan king, Penda, and by the pagan nation of the Mercians, that had slain his brother, as also by his son Alfred [i.e. Ealhfrith], and by his cousin-german Ethelwald [i.e. Œthelwald of Deira], the son of his brother who reigned before him.

Oswiu's first recorded action as king of Bernicia was to strengthen his position, and perhaps his claims to Deira, by marrying Edwin's daughter Eanflæd, then in exile in the Kingdom of Kent. This marriage took place between 642 and 644.

Oswiu is known to have been married three times. Eanflæd, his Queen, bore him two sons and two daughters. The sons were Ecgfrith (644/645–685) and Ælfwine (c. 660–679), the daughters Osthryth (died 697) and Ælfflæd (c. 654–714). The Irish princess Fín was the mother of Aldfrith (died 705). Finally, the British princess Rieinmelth of Rheged is named as a wife of Oswiu in the Historia Brittonum. It is thought that Ealhfrith was her son, and Eahlflæd may have been her daughter.

The first half of Oswiu's reign was spent in the shadow of Penda, who dominated much of Britain from 642 until 655, seemingly making and breaking kings as it suited him. The future kingdom of Northumbria was still composed of two distinct kingdoms in Oswiu's lifetime. The northerly kingdom of Bernicia, which extended from the River Tees to the Firth of Forth, was ruled by Oswiu. The kingdom of Deira, lying between the North York Moors and the Humber, was ruled by a series of Oswiu's kinsmen, initially as a separate kingdom, later as a form of appanage for Oswiu's sons.

For the first decade of Oswiu's reign, Deira was ruled by an independent king, Oswine, son of the apostate Osric, who belonged to the rival Deiran royal family. Oswine and Oswiu came into conflict circa 651. Bede blames Oswiu for the troubles and writes:

For when they had raised armies against one another, Oswin perceived that he could not maintain a war against one who had more auxiliaries than himself, and he thought it better at that time to lay aside all thoughts of engaging, and to preserve himself for better times. He therefore dismissed the army which he had assembled, and ordered all his men to return to their own homes, from the place that is called Wilfaresdun, that is, Wilfar's Hill, which is almost ten miles distant from the village called Cataract [i.e. Catterick], towards the north-west. He himself, with only one trusty soldier, whose name was Tonhere, withdrew and lay concealed in the house of Earl [comes] Hunwald, whom he imagined to be his most assured friend. But, alas! it was otherwise; for the earl betrayed him, and Oswy, in a detestable manner, by the hands of his commander [praefectus], Ethilwin, slew him...

In order to expiate the killing of Oswine, who was later reckoned a saint, Oswiu established Gilling Abbey at Gilling, where prayers were said for Oswine and for Oswiu. Oswine was followed as king of the Deirans by Oswald's son Œthelwald.

== Penda ==
Oswiu's relations with Penda were not entirely peaceful between 642 and 655. Bede appears to place a major assault on Bernicia by Penda, which reached the gates of Bamburgh, at some time before 651 and the death of Bishop Aidan of Lindisfarne. An entry in the Irish annals recording "[t]he battle of Oswy against Penda" circa 650 may refer to this campaign.

D.P. Kirby suggests that the killing of Oswine may have led to an improvement in relations between Penda and Oswiu in the early 650s. Oswiu's son Ealhfrith married Penda's daughter Cyneburh, while his daughter Ealhflæd married Penda's son Peada. Peada was baptised at Ad Murum—in the region of Hadrian's Wall—by Aidan's successor Finan. Peada and Ealhflæd took a missionary group, including Cedd and Diuma, to establish a church in their lands.

In 655 Bede reports that Penda invaded Bernicia at the head of a large army. Bede states that Oswiu offered "an incalculable quantity of regalia and presents as the price of peace", but that Penda refused. Oswiu vowed to give his daughter Ælfflæd to the church, and to found a dozen monasteries if he was granted the victory, and assisted by Ealhfrith he engaged Penda with a small army in the Battle of the Winwæd, which took place in the region of Loidis, which is to say Leeds. He was successful, and Penda was killed, along with many of his allies, including King Æthelhere of the East Angles. Œthelwald had assisted Penda, but stood aside from the fighting.

The Historia Brittonum gives a somewhat different account. Here, Oswiu's offer of treasure is accepted, and is associated with the siege of a place named Iudeu. It is assumed that Ecgfrith was given over as a hostage, into the keeping of Penda's queen Cynewise, at this time. The Historia suggests that many of Penda's allies were British kings, and notes that Cadafael ap Cynfeddw joined Œthelwald in avoiding the battle, so gaining the epithet Cadomedd (the Battle-Shirker). The decisive battle is located at "Gaius's field".

== Overlord of Britain ==
The surprising defeat of the hitherto dominant Penda, and the death of the East Anglian king Æthelhere left Oswiu as the dominant figure in Britain. Œthelwald's ambivalent stance during the campaign which led to the Winwæd appears to have led to his removal as he disappears from the record at this time. Oswiu installed his adult son Ealhfrith as king of Deirans in Œthelwald's place. Penda's son Peada was installed as king of southern Mercia, while Oswiu took the north of the kingdom. Other subject rulers seem to have been established elsewhere in Mercia.

Further south, Æthelhere's brother Æthelwold may have been established with Oswiu's assistance, as well as that of his kinsman by marriage King Eorcenberht of Kent. Cenwalh of Wessex, who had been driven out of his lands by Penda for putting aside his marriage to Penda's sister, may also have returned to power in this period, again with Oswiu's assistance. King Sigeberht the Good of the East Saxons was Oswiu's ally. Oswiu's nephew, Eanfrith's son Talorcan, may have also been established as a leading king among the Picts at this time.

Oswiu's total domination lasted only a short time, around three years. The proximate cause was the death of Peada, supposedly poisoned by his wife, Oswiu's daughter Eahlflæd. This probably occurred at Easter 656, and Oswiu proceeded to install governors or subject kings in Mercia. Probably in late 659, but perhaps in 657, a revolt led by three Mercian noblemen—Immin, Eata, and Eadberht—installed Penda's son Wulfhere as ruler of the Mercians and drove out Oswiu's supporters. Oswiu remained a force to be reckoned with, and political settlement rather than open warfare appears to have resolved the crisis. Oswiu's kinsman Trumhere was named to be Wulfhere's bishop. While Wulfhere extended Mercian influence and authority in southern Britain, he apparently continued to recognise Oswiu's primacy.

Welsh sources suggest that Oswiu campaigned in Wales in the late 650s, imposing tribute on the Welsh kings who had previously been Penda's allies such as Cadafael, the battle-dodging King of Gwynedd. Elsewhere in the south, Oswiu's ally Sigeberht of the East Saxons was murdered and replaced by his brother Swithhelm, who remained a Christian, but distanced himself from Oswiu and the Irish-Northumbrian church. Switthelm was probably subject to the East Angles.

== Ealhfrith and the Synod of Whitby ==
In 664 at the synod of Whitby, Oswiu accepted the usages of the Roman Church, which led to the departure of Bishop Colmán of Lindisfarne. Bede writes that the dispute was brought to a head by Oswiu's son Ealhfrith, who had adopted Roman usages at the urging of Wilfrid. Ealhfrith had been brought up with Irish-Northumbrian usages, and his rejection of these, along with the expulsion of the future saints Cuthbert of Lindisfarne and Eata of Hexham from Ripon, is considered to have had a strong political component. Equally, 665 would be a year, as Bede writes, "that Easter was kept twice in one year, so that when the King had ended Lent and was keeping Easter, the Queen and her attendants were still fasting and keeping Palm Sunday".

== Ecgfrith ==
In 660, Oswiu married his son Ecgfrith to Æthelthryth, daughter of the former East Anglian king Anna.

== Death ==
Even in his final years, Oswiu remained a major figure in Britain. The newly appointed Archbishop of Canterbury, Theodore of Tarsus, came north to meet him in 669. Bede writes that Oswiu had intended to undertake a pilgrimage to Rome in the company of Bishop Wilfrid. However, he fell ill and died, aged 58, on 15 February 670. His elder son by Queen Eanflæd, Ecgfrith, succeeded him as King of Bernicia, while their younger son, Ælfwine, succeeded Ecgfrith as King of Deira. He was buried at Whitby Abbey, alongside Edwin of Deira. His widow and their daughter Ælflæd were later Abbess of Whitby and were also buried there.

Alcuin, writing about a century after Oswiu's death, describes him as "very just, with equitable laws, unconquered in battle but trustworthy in peace, generous in gifts to the wretched, pious, equitable to all".

== Family ==
- Alhfrith
- Ecgfrith
- Ælfwine
- Osthryth
- Ælfflæd
- Aldfrith
- Ealhflæd

== Holy relics ==
Oswy and his wife Eanflæd were given relics of several saints from Pope Vitalian around 665: Saint Peter, Saint Paul, Saint Laurentius, John the Apostle, Saint Gregory, and Saint Pancras. Eanflæd was also granted "a cross, with a gold key to it, made out of the most holy chains of the apostles, Peter and Paul". This gift is documented by Bede in Ecclesiastical History of the English People as part of a returning delegation from Rome, which had been led by Wighard.

== See also ==
- Kings of Mercia family tree
