= Christianity in Roman Britain =

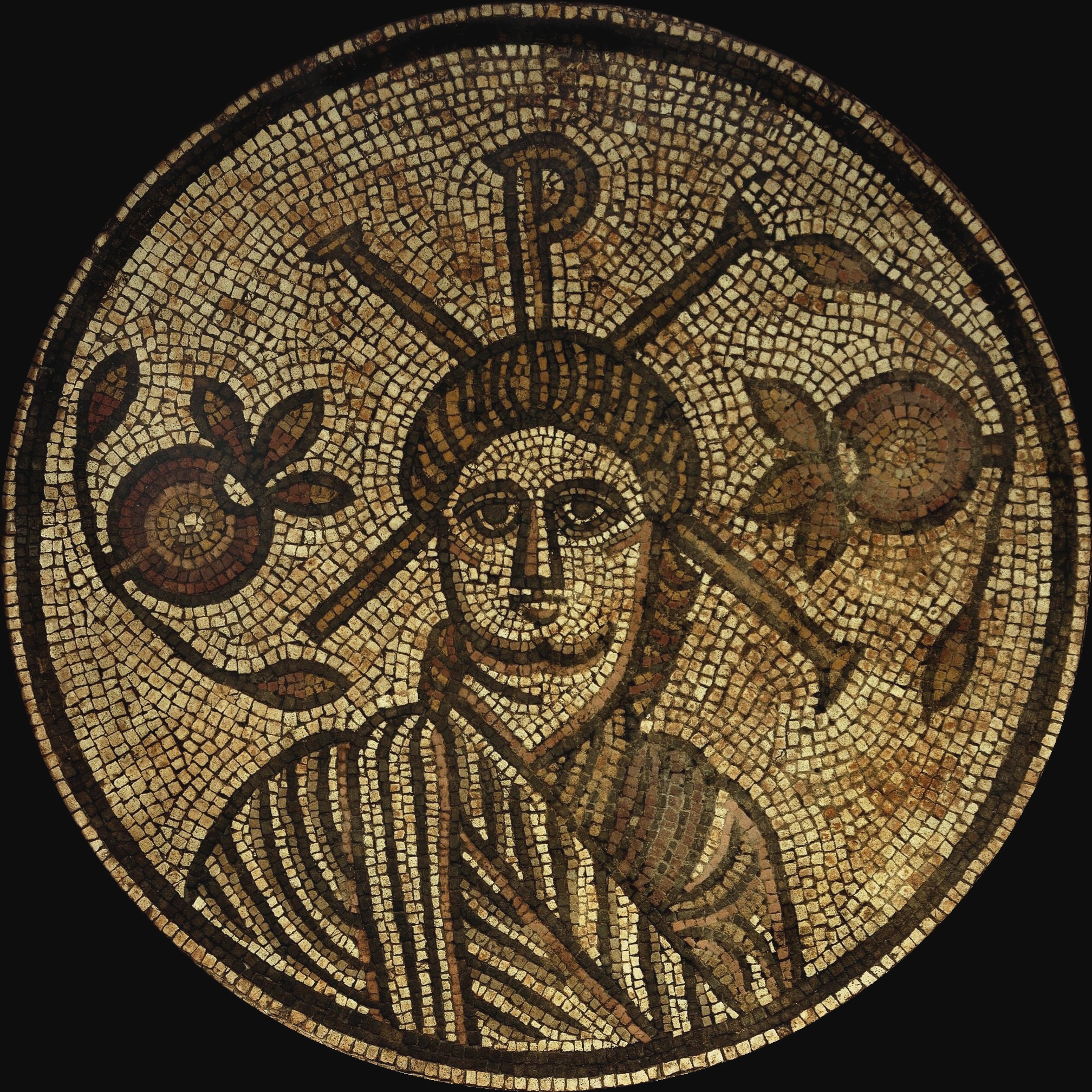
Detail of 4th-century Hinton St Mary Mosaic showing Christ with chi-rho in background

Christianity was present in Roman Britain from at least the third century until the end of the Roman imperial administration in the early fifth century, and continued in western Britain.

Religion in Roman Britain was generally polytheistic, involving multiple gods and goddesses. Christianity was different in being monotheistic or believing in only one deity. Christianity was one of several religions introduced to Britain from the eastern part of the empire, others being those dedicated to certain deities, such as Cybele, Isis, and Mithras.

After the collapse of Roman imperial administration, much of southern and eastern Britain was affected by the Anglo-Saxon migrations and a transition to Anglo-Saxon paganism as the primary religion. The Anglo-Saxons were later converted to Christianity in the seventh century and the institutional church reintroduced, following the Augustinian mission. There remained an awareness among Anglo-Saxon Christian writers like Bede that a Romano-British Christianity had existed. In fact, the Romano-British church existed continuously in Wales.

== Evidence ==
The archaeological evidence for Christianity in Roman Britain is not extensive, but the available evidence helps scholars determine the extent of the religion in this period. Determining whether an item was used in Christian or pagan symbolism and usage is not always straightforward, with the interpretation of such items often being speculative. This Christian material represents a "tiny proportion" of archaeological material recovered from Roman Britain.

Literary sources include the Ecclesiastical History of the English People by Bede, The Ruin of Britain by Gildas, British History attributed to Nennius, and hagiography, particularly The Life of Saint Germanus of Auxerre by Constantius of Lyon.

== Context ==
The province of Britain within the wider Roman Empire, as it existed in 125 CE.

Roman Britain was religiously diverse, with followers of the native Celtic religion, Roman religion, and imported eastern religions. These eastern cults included those of the deities Isis, Mithras, and Cybele. Christianity was just one of these eastern cults. Christianity was an offshoot of Judaism, but there is no direct evidence that Judaism was practised in Roman Britain.

These separate religious traditions developed into a hybrid Romano-Celtic religion through cultural mixing. Indigenous deities and Roman counterparts were sometimes syncretised, like Apollo-Cunomaglus and Sulis-Minerva. Romano-British temples were sometimes erected at older, pre-Roman cultic sites. A new style of Romano-Celtic temple developed that was influenced by both Iron Age and imperial Roman architectural styles but was also unique. Buildings in this style remained in use until the 4th century.

People typically believed in a wide range of gods and goddesses. They worshipped several of them, likely selecting some local and tribal deities and some of the major divinities venerated across the Empire. The archaeologist Martin Henig suggested that to "sense something of the spiritual environment of Christianity at this time", it would be useful to imagine India, where Hinduism, "a major polytheistic system", remains dominant, and "where churches containing images of Christ and the Virgin are in a tiny minority against the many temples of gods and goddesses".

== Chronology ==
=== 2nd and 3rd centuries ===
According to Pseudo-Hippolytus and St. Dorotheus of Tyre, the first bishop in Britain was Aristobulus of Britannia.

Modern scholars, however, do not know precisely when Christianity arrived in Roman Britain. The province experienced a constant influx of people from across the empire, some of whom were Christians. There is a difference between transient Christians who may have arrived in Britain and a settled, Romano-British Christian community. Historian Dorothy Watts suggested that Christianity was perhaps introduced to Britain in the latter part of the 2nd century.

Around 200, the Carthaginian theologian Tertullian included Britain in a list of places reached by Christianity in his work, Adversus Judaeos. His contemporary, the Greek theologian Origen also wrote that Christianity had reached Britain. The accuracy of these statements can be questioned given that both writers had a strong rhetorical aspect to their work, which was designed to glorify what was still an illegal and underground religious movement. It is nevertheless possible that Tertullian and Origen were basing their statements on some reality.

Christianity experienced slow and steady growth in the empire during the 3rd century. However, the number of British Christians was probably small, and it is unlikely there was any extensive church organisation before the 4th century. In the mid-3rd century, there was an intensification of the persecution of Christians, particularly under the Emperors Decius (r. 249–251) and Valerian (r. 253–260). These waves of persecution may have impacted the Christian community in Britain. It is possible that Saints Alban, Julius and Aaron, three Romano-British martyrs mentioned in early medieval sources, were killed at this time. In 260, the Emperor Gallienus issued an edict that decriminalised Christianity, allowing the church to own property as a corporate body.

=== 4th and 5th centuries ===
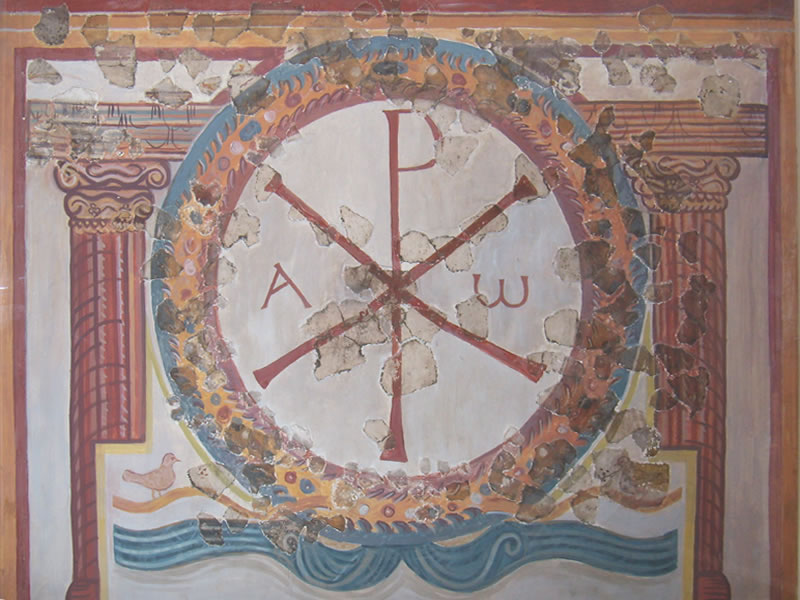
Chi-Rho fresco from Lullingstone Roman Villa built around 360

The most severe persecution of Christians by the empire began in 303 under Diocletian (r. 284–305). Nevertheless, it appears that British Christians suffered less during the Diocletianic Persecution than Christians elsewhere. In 313, the Western Roman Emperor Constantine and Eastern Roman Emperor Licinius issued the Edict of Milan, putting an end to the persecution of Christians in the empire.

The Christian church in the Roman Empire based its organisation on Roman provinces. The church in each city was led by a bishop, and the chief city of the province was led by a metropolitan bishop. In 314, Constantine called the Council of Arles, the first church council summoned by a Roman emperor. The council condemned Donatism and agreed to follow the Roman church's method of calculating the date for Easter. The British bishops in attendance were Eborius from Eboracum (York), Restitutus from Londinium (London), and Adelfius possibly from Lindum Colonia (Lincoln). These cities were provincial capitals, and the bishops were likely metropolitans with authority over the other bishops in their provinces. The presence of the three bishops indicates that by the early 4th century, the British Christian community was organised on a regional basis and held a distinct episcopal hierarchy.

The names of several Romano-British bishops have also been found in inscriptions on archaeological finds. On the Risley Park Lanx is a fragmentary inscription stating "Bishop Exuperius gave [this] to..." A lead salt-pan from Shavington, Cheshire also contains a Latin inscription which likely related "Of Viventius, the bishop...".

The British church was affected by the Arian controversy, but it appears that the British bishops were united against Arianism. While no British bishops attended the First Council of Nicaea in 325, considered the first ecumenical council, British churchmen were present at other councils called to settle the controversy. According to Athanasius, the Patriarch of Alexandria, British bishops attended the Council of Serdica in 343. However, the council records do not indicate any British bishops were present; for this reason, historian Richard Sharpe argued that Athanasius was inaccurate. The Gallo-Roman chronicler Sulpicius Severus claimed that at least three bishops from Britain were in attendance at the Council of Ariminum in 359. Emperor Constantius II offered lodging at public expense, but most bishops refused, except for the British. This suggests that the British church was either poor or numerically small.

By the 4th century, there were probably Romano-British families split by their religious allegiance; some Christian, others following pagan religions. Some individuals may have oscillated between the two. By the second half of the 4th century, Christians held several senior administrative posts within the government of the civil diocese. The Roman poet Ausonius corresponded with Flavius Sanctus, the Christian governor of one of the British provinces.

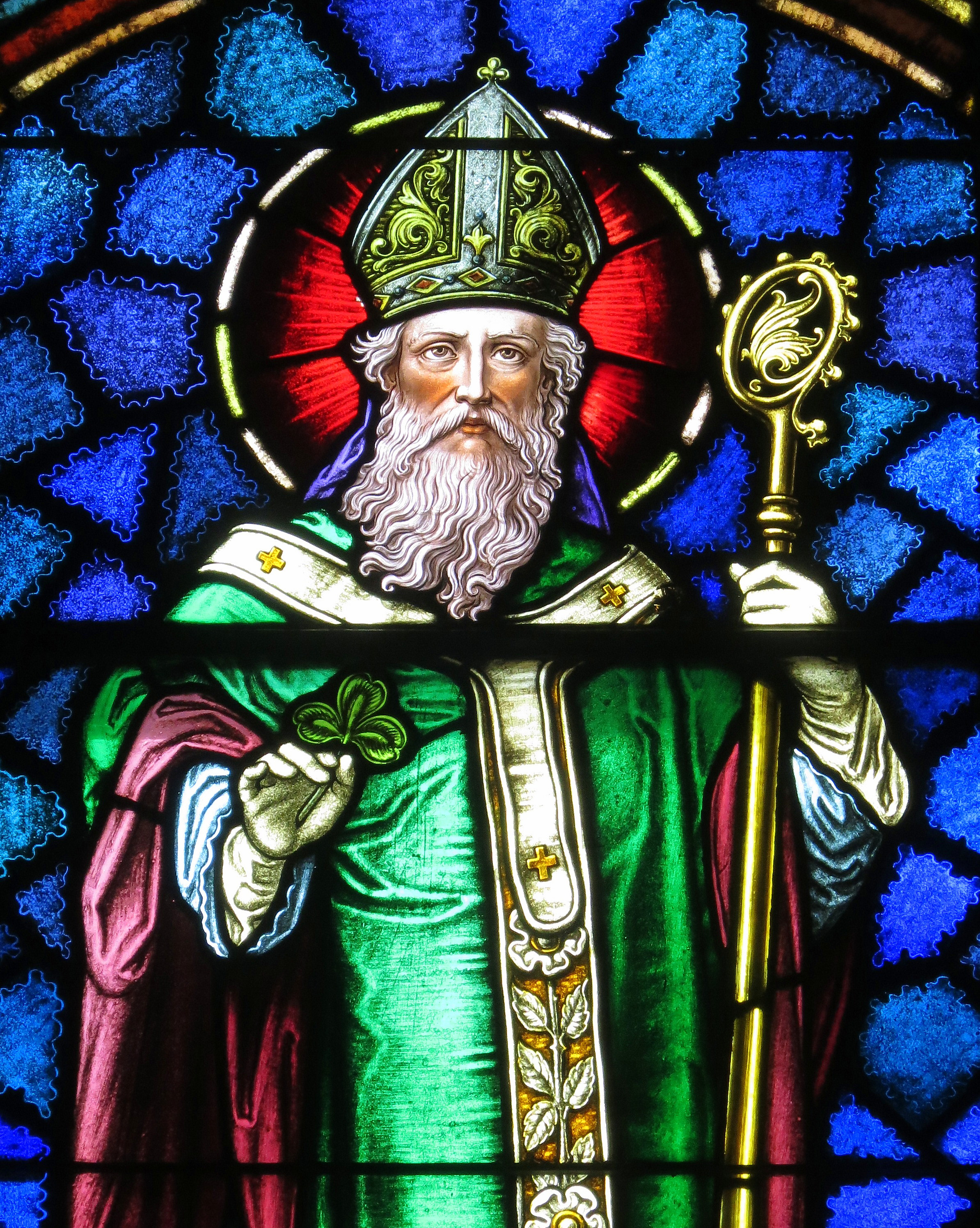
A modern depiction of Saint Patrick, the only Romano-British Christian to leave a surviving written testimony

In 391, Emperor Theodosius banned all pagan religions throughout the empire, with Christianity now the official religion. Theodosius' decree would probably have impacted Britain and been acted upon by the provincial administration. Martin Henig suggested that by the end of the 4th century, "a large proportion of British society, however materially impoverished," was Christian.

Several prominent Christians were Romano-British by birth. Pelagius, the originator of Pelagianism, was likely born in Britain in the second half of the 4th century, although lived most of his life in continental Europe. Saint Patrick was also born in Britain to a family who had been Christians for at least three generations. His Confessio of St Patrick is the only surviving written testimony that was written by a Romano-British Christian, although mostly discusses his time in Ireland rather than Britain. In the 470s, Apollinaris Sidonius, the Bishop of Clermont, wrote to Faustus, Bishop of Riez, referring to the latter as having been British by birth.

There are various other surviving textual references attesting to the presence of Christianity in late 4th and 5th century Britain. In the 390s, Victricius, the Bishop of Rouen, travelled to Britain and in his De Laude Sanctorum referred to a priesthood existing there. Another Gaulish bishop, Germanus of Auxerre, was sent to Britain by Pope Celestine I in 429, there to deal with a bishop named Agricola who was promoting Pelagianism. The Life of Saint Germanus refers to the bishop visiting Britain for a second time, this time with a Bishop Severus, in the last year of his life, although the precise year is not known.

=== 5th and 6th century survivals ===
Many archaeologists believe that the end of Roman life in Britain occurred swiftly during the first three decades of the fifth century. This event was followed by the Anglo-Saxon migration, during which linguistically Germanic communities from modern Denmark and northern Germany settled in Britain, forming the cultural area now known as Anglo-Saxon England. Archaeologists tend toward the view that this transition from Romano-British to Anglo-Saxon culture was piecemeal and gradual, rather than the result of a sudden conquest.

Textual sources suggest that the Christian communities established in the Roman province survived in Western Britain during the fourth, fifth, and sixth centuries. This Western British Christianity proceeded to develop on its own terms. In the 540s, Gildas was condemning British bishops. During the twentieth century, various scholars of Western British Christianity avoided explanations of Romano-British survival and instead sought to trace the origins of Christianity in this part of Europe to sea routes. The first to challenge this assumption was Jocelyn Toynbee, who argued that Romano-British Christianity was in fact the parent of what she termed "the so-called Celtic Church" of Western Britain.

In the late sixth century, the Pope ordered that Augustine of Canterbury lead the Gregorian Mission to convert the Anglo-Saxons to Christianity. According to the writings of the later monk Bede, these Augustinian missionaries utilised an old Romano-British church that had been dedicated to St Martin and gained permission from the Kentish king to restore several pre-existing churches. The survival of Romano-British churches in this period is also attested in other sources, like the Life of St Wilfrid.

== Features ==
=== Church buildings ===
In Roman Britain, the church primarily served as the place where the Eucharist was celebrated. It also had overlapping functions, for instance as a meeting place, a place of group worship, and a place for solitary prayer. Unlike later medieval Britain, Roman Britain lacked a dense network of parish churches. Instead, a range of different types of church structure were present across the region. One term for a church that was likely used in Roman Britain was altare, a term which appears in an inscription from the Christian Water Newton hoard and which was not commonly used for pagan cult sites.

Church buildings would have required an altar at which the Eucharist could be celebrated, a place from where readings could be made, space for the offertory procession, and room for the congregation. Comparisons from other parts of the Roman Empire indicate that Romano-British examples likely also had a cathedra chair where the bishop would sit, and a vestibulum, or room where the unbaptised could withdraw.

The sporadic persecution of Christians which occurred for several centuries prevented the construction of official, purpose-built churches. Instead, early Christian meeting places were often indistinguishable from residential houses. Although some of these church house (domus ecclesiae) have been recognised in other parts of the empire, none have so far been discovered in Britain.

It is possible that Christians might have adopted pre-existing Romano-Celtic temples as their places of worship. This is an explanation which archaeologists have advanced in discussions of the Verulamium temple in front of the theatre.

There are also other pre-Christian religious sites which may have been adopted by Romano-British Christians. One example is the Chedworth spring.

There is a long-standing tradition in London that St Peter upon Cornhill church was founded by King Lucius after his conversion in 179 AD. Interestingly, the church altar is sited directly above the potential location of a pagan shrine room, of the great Roman London basilica. If Lucius did exist, it could make sense that he turned the pagan shrine room into a church.

Two other facts however, may give credence to St Peter's Roman past. The first is that London sent a bishop, Restitutus, to the Council of Arles in 314 AD. Restitutus must have had a church base. Secondly, in 1417, during a discussion about the order of precedence in a Whit Monday procession, the Mayor of London confirmed that St Peter's was the first church founded in London. Given that St Paul's Cathedral was founded in 604, this clearly implies that St Peter's was considered in 1417 to be founded pre-600.

=== Ceremonies ===
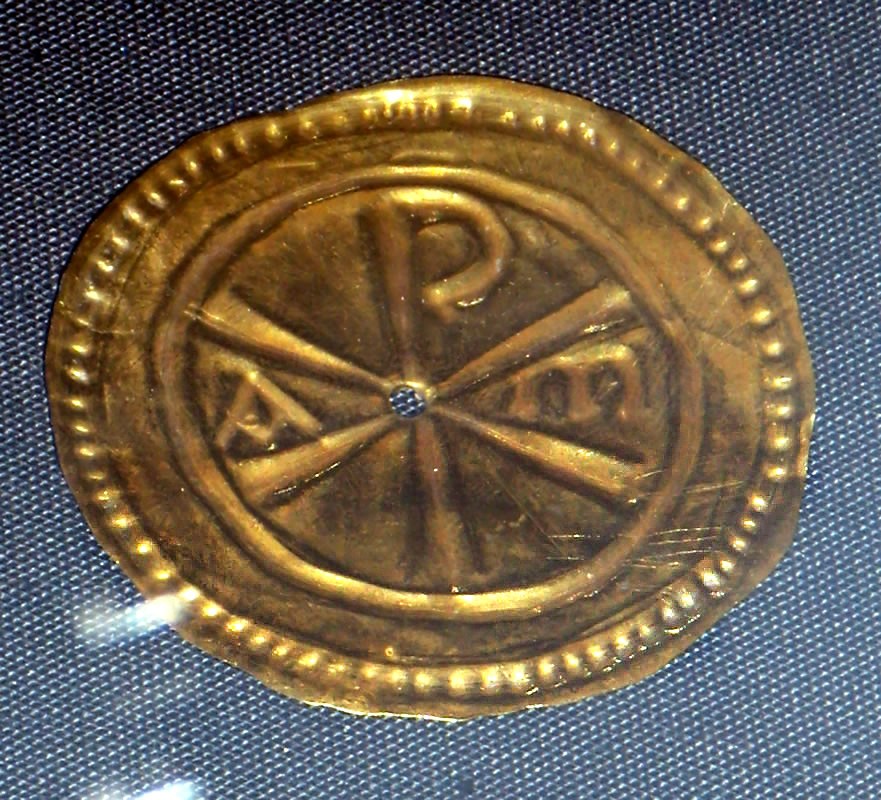
Votive plaque with Chi-Rho symbol from the Water Newton hoard

The existence of Christian symbolism on flagons, bowls, cups, spoons, wine strainers and other items used to hold food or drink suggests the existence of Christian feasts in Roman Britain. That many of these items, such as those from the Water Newton hoard, were lavish, suggests that the Christian community might depend on its wealthier members for their ceremonial material.

Some mosaic floors are likely to depict Christian imagery.

Most Romano-British Christians were probably illiterate and most of their knowledge of Christianity would have come through ceremony.

=== Martyrs and saints ===
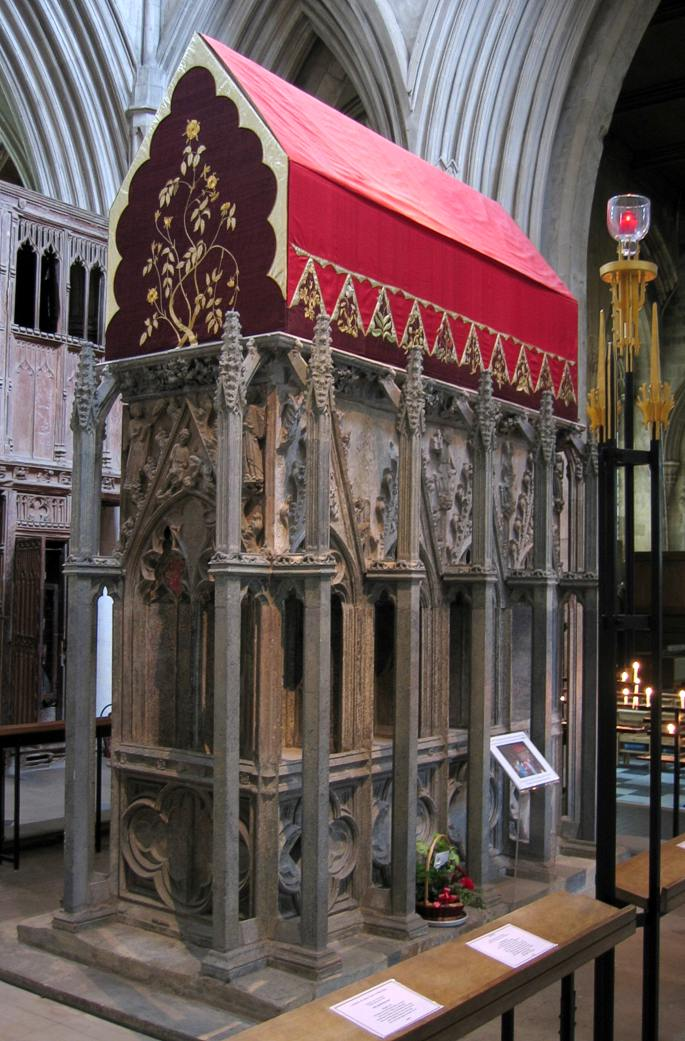
Shrine of Saint Alban in St Albans Cathedral

There are three known Christian martyrs from Roman Britain: Saints Julius and Aaron and Saint Alban. There has been considerable debate among historians as to when these individuals lived and died. The name Aaron is Hebrew and might suggest an individual of Jewish heritage. Aaron and Julius were probably martyred in a single event during the 3rd century. This likely occurred before c. 290, when the legions withdrew from Caerleon.

The date of Alban's death is disputed, but he died at Verulamium (later renamed St Albans) where St Albans Abbey was later built. Alban is the only Romano-British martyr whose cult definitely survived the termination of the Roman imperial administration among an enclave of British Christians. Germanus described visiting Alban's shrine and exchanging relics there in 429. Bede writes that his cult was still venerated in the 8th century and that his tomb was the site of miracles. There may have been other Romano-British saints' cults which survived into the 6th and 7th centuries, when they were suppressed amid the Anglo-Saxon migration.

== Interpretation ==
=== Medieval and early modern periods ===
After the fall of Roman imperial rule, Britain entered what historians call the early medieval period. During this period, there was an awareness that Christianity had existed in Roman Britain. Gildas, a British Christian monk living somewhere in Western Britain during the sixth century CE, discussed the issue in his De Excidio et Conquestu Britanniae ("The Ruin and Conquest of Britain"). Many of the claims which Gildas made about the establishment of Christianity in Roman Britain are at odds with the information provided in other sources; he for instance claimed that the emperor Tiberius was a Christian who sanctioned the religion's spread, and that the British Church underwent a schism due to the influence of Arianism. The arrival of Christianity was later discussed by Bede, an Anglo-Saxon monk based in the Kingdom of Northumbria, in his eighth-century Ecclesiastical History of the English People. Here, he used Gildas' work among other sources to relate his narrative. Bede's agenda differed from that of Gildas in that he sought to present the British Church as heterodox and his own, English Church, as orthodox. The next early medieval source to discuss Romano-British Christianity was the ninth-century Historia Brittonum, later attributed—perhaps mistakenly—to the Welsh monk Nennius.

In the high and later Middle Ages, historical accounts continued to be produced which discussed the establishment of Christianity in Roman Britain. These were, according to Petts, increasingly "garbled and fanciful" in their narratives. Writing in his twelfth century Historia Regum Britanniae, Geoffrey of Monmouth for instance added new details to the conversion tale, for instance by naming Faganus and Duvianus as two of the missionaries who brought Christianity to Britain. He also claimed that the Empress Helena, mother of Constantine, had been the daughter of a (mythical) ruler of Colchester, King Coel. Another twelfth-century writer, William of Malmesbury, added the claim that Joseph of Aramathea had arrived in Glastonbury in his Gesta Regum Anglorum. Such stories entered and influenced popular folklore, where they were further altered.

There was a revived interest in Romano-British Christianity in the sixteenth and seventeenth century, where it occurred against a backdrop of the arguments between adherents of Roman Catholicism and Protestantism. An Italian writer, Polydore Vergil, came to England in 1501 and befriended King Henry VIII; he wrote the Historiae Anglicae, which dealt with the arrival of Christianity. Following the English Reformation, in which the Church of England switched its allegiance from Roman Catholicism to the Protestant-influenced Anglicanism, there were a growing number of English theologians who turned to the first arrival of Christianity in Britain to argue that the island had preserved an older, purer form of Christianity separate from that which had been corrupted by the Church in Rome.

=== Archaeology and the development of scholarship ===
In the early eighteenth century, archaeology began to develop as a discipline in Britain. A number of Romano-British Christian artefacts were discovered at this time, although their origins were not always recognised. In some cases items were recognised as being Romano-British, but not as Christian; in others they were recognised as being Christian, but not Romano-British. For example, the ploughing of a field in Risley, Derbyshire in 1729 revealed a lanx plate featuring a Chi-Rho symbol. It was investigated by the antiquarian William Stukeley, who noted its Christian symbolism but who thought that it had likely originated in France and been brought to England by fifteenth-century soldiers. In another instance, a Romano-British beaker decorated with Biblical scenes was discovered in a child's grave within the Anglo-Saxon cemetery at Long Wittenham, Oxfordshire during excavations led by John Yonge Akerman in the 1850s. Akerman regarded it as being early medieval and of Gaulish origin. The first attempt to synthesise archaeological and historical material to understand Romano-British Christianity was an academic paper published in the English Historical Review; written by Francis J. Haverfield in 1896, it remained little known among scholars.

It was in the twentieth century that more significant quantities of Romano-British Christian material was discovered. Various hoards, such as that from Mildenhall, were found that contained Christian material. The excavation of various Roman villas, such as that at Hinton St Mary, Dorset, revealed Christian symbolism on mosaics. The excavation of St Paul-in-the-Bail in Lincoln resulted in the discovery of a Romano-British church that had once existed on the site. By the latter half of that century there was sufficient material available that archaeologists could discuss Christianity in Roman Britain independently of the historical record. A major attempt to discuss the archaeological evidence was in a paper by the art historian Jocelyn Toynbee in 1953, which focused primarily on attempts to recognise Christian motifs and symbols on artefacts. Following Toynbee, the most important contribution to the subject was Charles Thomas' Christianity in Roman Britain to AD 500; published in 1981, it discussed historical, archaeological, and linguistic evidence.

There remains divisions among scholars in their understanding of Romano-British Christianity. This divide is often based on disciplinary divisions, with scholars of Roman archaeology and history on one side and scholars of Celtic studies or of early medieval archaeology and history on the other.
