= Healaugh Old Hall =

Building in Healaugh, North Yorkshire, England

Coordinates: 53°55′28″N 1°14′29″W

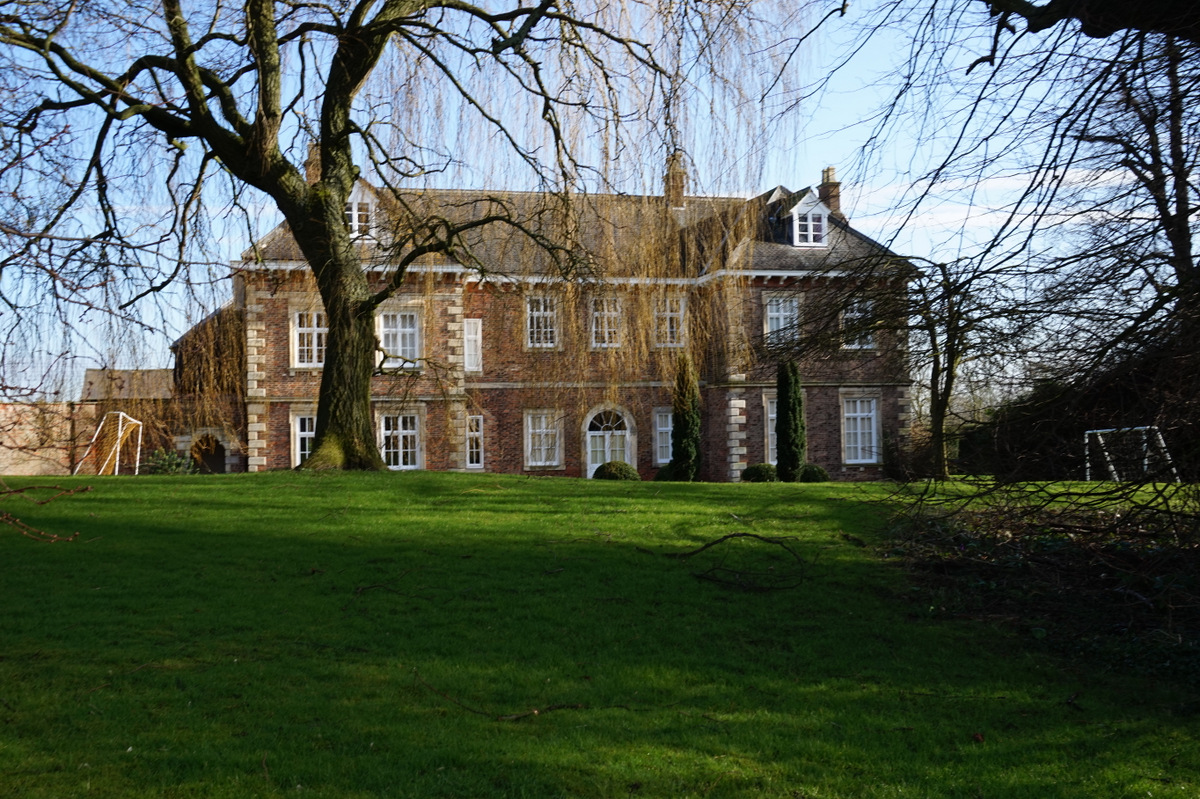
The building, in 2016

Healaugh Old Hall is a historic building in Healaugh, a village near Selby in North Yorkshire, in England.

The house was built in 1718 for the Brooksbank family, who relocated from nearby Healaugh Park Priory. In 1785, the family moved to a new Healaugh Hall, which was later demolished. Rear wings were added to the Old Hall in about 1860, with the space between them infilled in the 20th century. The house was grade II listed, along with the wall to its left, in 1985. The garden may be visited by arrangement, as part of the Quiet Gardens Movement.

The house is built of brick with stone dressings, quoins, a floor band, an eaves band, and a Welsh slate roof. It has a U-shaped plan, with a middle range of two storeys and four bays, and projecting wings of two storeys and attics, and two bays. Each wing is on a plinth and has a hipped roof. The windows in the main range are casements, most with plain surrounds, and in the wings are sashes in architraves, with dormers in the roof. On the left of the house is a brick wall with stone coping containing an archway with a seating nook. The interior is mostly recent, but has early window shutters, coving and ceiling beams.

== See also ==
- Listed buildings in Healaugh, Selby
