= St John the Baptist Church, Healaugh =

Anglican church in North Yorkshire, England

Coordinates: 53°55′30″N 1°14′33″W

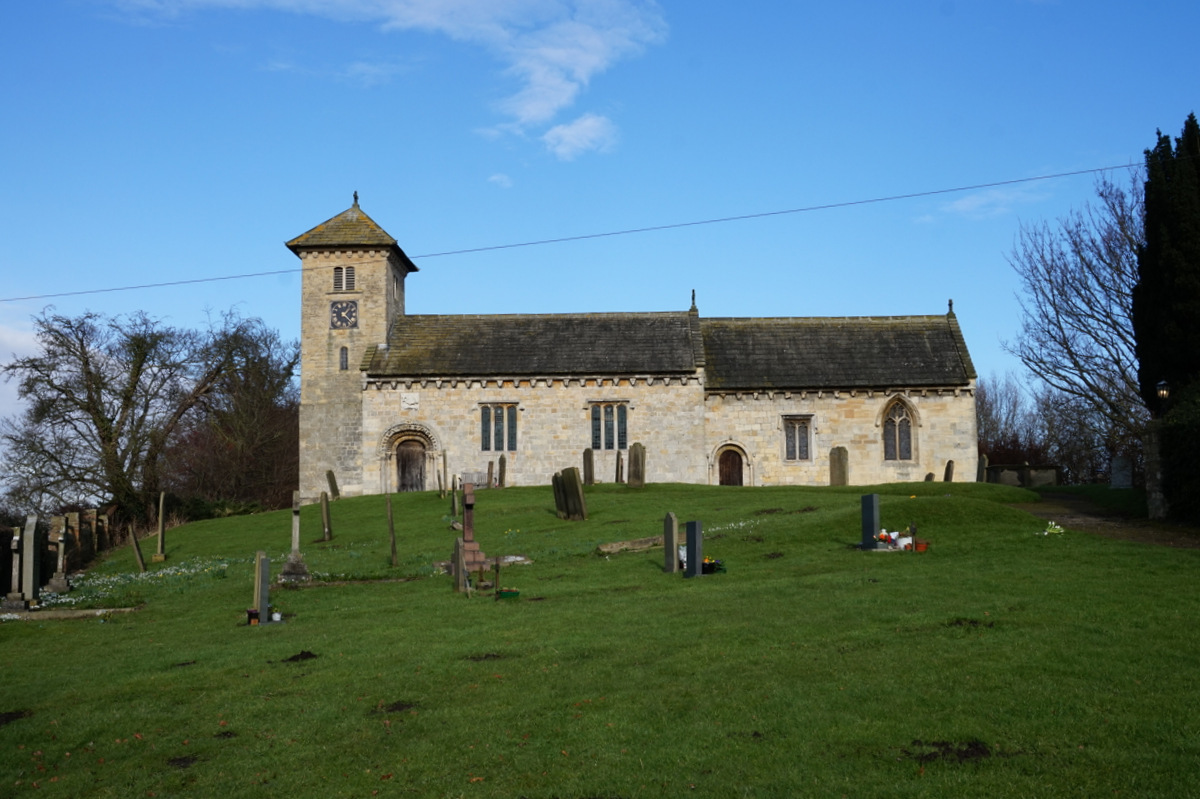
The church, in 2016

St John the Baptist Church is the parish church of Healaugh, a village west of York and north of Tadcaster in North Yorkshire, in England.

The church was originally dedicated to Saint Helen. The chancel and south door are the oldest parts of the church, dating from about 1150. The north aisle and door are from the late 12th century, and there were various alterations to the church in the 15th century. The nave was rebuilt in the 16th century, and the tower may have been rebuilt at the same time. By the late 18th century, the church was in poor condition, and it was extensively renovated, with the tower probably again rebuilt. The upper stage of the tower was added in the 19th century. The church was Grade II* listed in 1985.

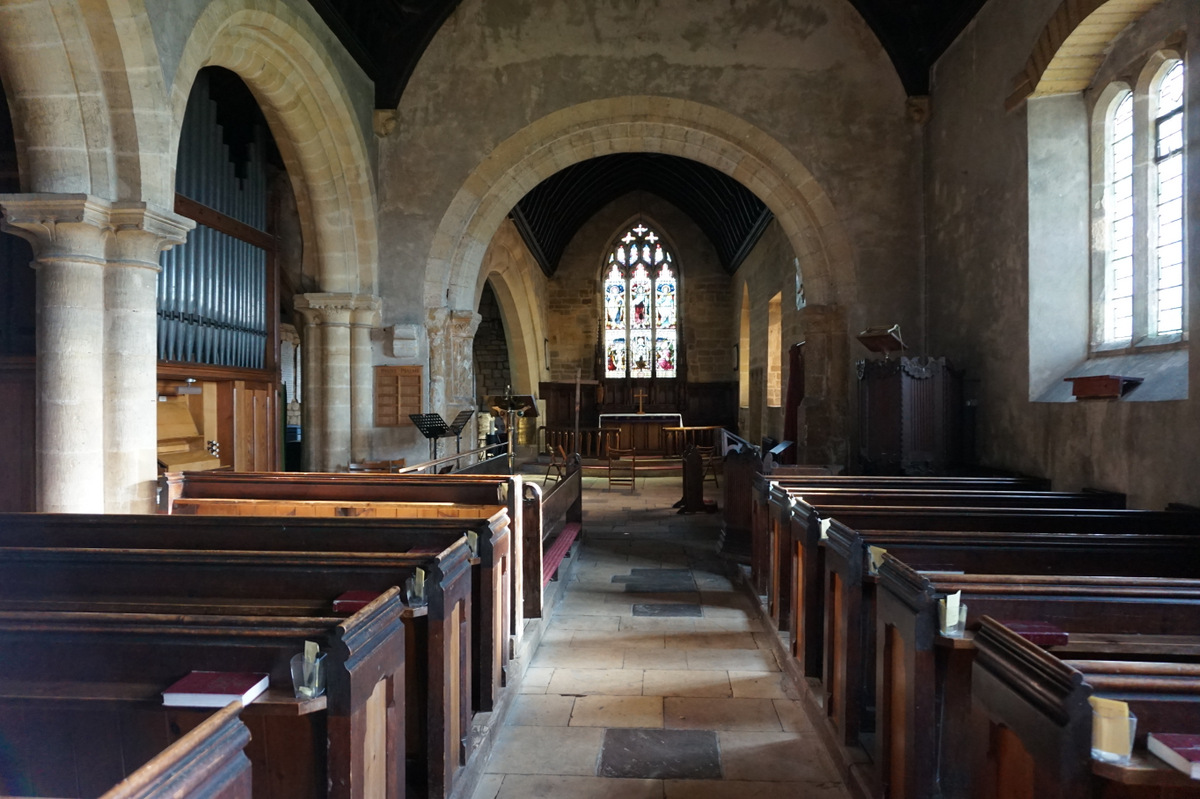
View from the nave into the chancel, in 2016

The church is built of Magnesian Limestone and has a Welsh slate roof. The nave is of three bays, with a north aisle and chapel. Its south door is the most notable feature, with a round head with three orders of decoration, including carvings of various human figures, and human and animal heads. There are various pointed windows, those in the chancel and chapel being Perpendicular. Inside, the columns are carved as clusters, with water-leaf capitals. The decoration of the chancel arch includes small animals. In the north chapel is an alabaster tomb, dating from the 16th century, depicting Thomas Wharton, 1st Baron Wharton and both his wives. The windows are 20th century and include a mention of Hieu, who founded nearby Healaugh Park Priory. The clock dates from the later 18th century, and was rebuilt in 1911.

== See also ==
- Grade II* listed churches in North Yorkshire (district)
- Listed buildings in Healaugh, Selby
