= Brooksbank baronets =

Baronetcy in the Baronetage of the United Kingdom

- Escutcheon of the Brooksbank baronets of Healaugh Manor
- Creation date: 1919
- Status: extant
- Arms: Azure two bars wavy Argent within a bordure Or
- Crest: A hart's head couped Argent attired Or charged on the neck with two bars wavy Azure

The Brooksbank Baronetcy, of Healaugh Manor, in the parish of Healaugh, in the West Riding of the County of York, is a title in the Baronetage of the United Kingdom. It was created on 15 September 1919 for Edward Brooksbank. He was a Justice of the Peace and a Deputy Lieutenant for the West Riding of Yorkshire. He was succeeded by his grandson, the second Baronet (the son of Lieutenant-Colonel Edward Brooksbank, eldest son of the first Baronet). He was a Colonel in the Yorkshire Yeomanry and also served as a justice of the peace and as a Deputy Lieutenant of the East Riding of Yorkshire. Currently, the title is held by his son, the third Baronet, who succeeded in 1983.

== Family history ==
Stamp Brooksbank (1694–1756), great-great-great-grandfather of the first Baronet, was Governor of the Bank of England from 1741 to 1743 and represented Saltash and Colchester in the House of Commons. He acquired Healaugh Manor, near Tadcaster, North Yorkshire.

The younger brother of Sir (Edward) William Brooksbank, 2nd Baronet (1915–1983) was Captain Stamp Godfrey Brooksbank (1922–2017). Capt. Brooksbank married Celia Dorothy Coke (1919–1996), a daughter of Sir John (Jack) Spencer Coke (1880–1957). He held the office of Gentleman Usher to King George VI and Extra Gentleman Usher to Queen Elizabeth II. Sir Jack was the fifth son of Thomas Coke, 2nd Earl of Leicester. Capt. Brooksbank's son, George Edward Brooksbank (1949–2021), was a chartered accountant and an Old Etonian. He is the father of Jack Christopher Stamp Brooksbank (b. 1986), a wine merchant and the husband of Princess Eugenie of York, and his brother Thomas Brooksbank (b. 1988). Through the Earls of Leicester, the Brooksbank family is descended from both King Edward III and King James II. Jack Brooksbank and Princess Eugenie are third cousins twice removed, both being descended from Thomas Coke, 2nd Earl of Leicester (1822–1909).

On 12 October 2018, Charles Brooksbank, the first cousin of Jack Brooksbank gave the first reading at the wedding of Princess Eugenie and Jack Brooksbank.

== List ==
- Sir Edward Clitherow Brooksbank, 1st Baronet (1858–1943)
  - Edward York Brooksbank (1888–1935) – second son of the 1st Baronet, died before his father
- Sir (Edward) William Brooksbank, 2nd Baronet (1915–1983) – grandson of the 1st Baronet (son of Edward York Brooksbank)
- Sir (Edward) Nicholas Brooksbank, 3rd Baronet (born 1944) – only son of the 2nd Baronet

The heir apparent to the Baronetcy is the 3rd Baronet's son, (Florian) Thomas Charles Brooksbank (born 9 August 1982).

== See also ==
- The Brooksbank School
