= Listed buildings in Healaugh, Selby =

Healaugh is a civil parish in the former Selby district of North Yorkshire, England. It contains 14 listed buildings that are recorded in the National Heritage List for England. Of these, two are listed at Grade II*, the middle of the three grades, and the others are at Grade II, the lowest grade. The parish contains the village of Healaugh and the surrounding countryside. Most of the listed buildings are houses and associated structures, and the others include a church, a former priory, part of which has been converted into a house, and the remains of a medieval cross

== Key ==
Grade	Criteria
II*	Particularly important buildings of more than special interest
II	Buildings of national importance and special interest

== Buildings ==
Name and location	Photograph	Date	Notes	Grade
St John's Church; 53.92493°N 1.24243°W		12th century	The church has been altered and extended through the centuries, including a restoration in 1860. It is built in magnesian limestone with a Welch slate roof. The church consists of a nave, a north aisle, a south porch, and a chancel with a north vestry. At the west end is a two-stage bell tower with two-light bell openings, a corbel table and a hipped roof. The south doorway has a round head with three orders, the outer order with heads, the middle order with beakheads, and the inner order with roll-moulding. There are two orders of colonnettes with decorated foliage capitals, and above the doorway is a hood mould containing the figure of Christ.	II*
Healaugh Priory; 53.91104°N 1.26204°W		c. 1150–1200	A priory, later a house, in magnesian limestone, with battlements and a Welsh slate roof. There are two storeys, the garden front has five bays, and at the rear is an outshut. The doorway has chamfered jambs and a four-centred arch, and most of the windows have chamfered mullions and hood moulds with triangular decoration in the spandrels. At the rear is a doorway with a gravestone re-used as a step, the ground floor windows are casements in chamfered surrounds, and the upper floor contains two-light mullioned windows.	II*
Stone cross 53.92426°N 1.24164°W		Medieval	The remains of the cross to the west of The Old Hall are in stone and about 1 metre (3 ft 3 in) high. The base has a square plan, and is moulded and stepped, and the shaft is octagonal and broken.	II
The Old Hall and wall 53.92435°N 1.24131°W		Late 17th century	The house, which was extended in about 1860 with the addition of the south wing, is in brick with stone dressings, quoins, a floor band, an eaves band, and a Welsh slate roof. There is a U-shaped plan, with a middle range of two storeys and four bays, and projecting wings of two storeys and attics, and two bays. Each wing is on a plinth and has a hipped roof. The windows in the main range are casements, most with plain surrounds, and in the wings are sashes in architraves, with dormers in the roof. On the left of the house is a brick wall with stone coping containing an archway with a seating nook.	II
Gate piers, The Old Hall; 53.92415°N 1.24149°W	—	Late 17th century	The gate piers flanking the entrance to the drive are in stone with a square plan and are about 3 metres (9.8 ft) high. Each pier is plain, and has a cornice ramping up to a peak, and a ball finial.	II
Wighill Lane Farmhouse; 53.92296°N 1.24366°W	—	Early to mid 18th century	A farmhouse and a farmworkers' dwelling later combined into a house, it is in pinkish-brown brick and has a roof of pantile and stone slate. The farmhouse has a floor band, two storeys, three bays, a rear wing, and an outshut in red brick. The doorway has a blocked elliptical arch, and the windows are sashes. The workers' building has two low storeys, two bays and casement windows.	II
15 Main Street; 53.92293°N 1.24104°W		Mid 18th century	The house is in pinkish-brown brick with a pantile roof, two storeys and four bays. Above the doorway is a blocked window, the other windows are sashes, most of them horizontally-sliding, and apart from one soldier arch, all the openings have blocked elliptical arches.	II
Ivy House; 53.92251°N 1.24073°W	—	Mid 18th century	The house is in pinkish-brown brick, with a floor band, and a roof of pantile and stone slate. There are two storeys, four bays, and outshuts. On the front is a doorway, the ground floor contains sash windows and one blocked window, and in the upper floor are two casement windows, one sash window and a blocked window. All the openings have blocked elliptical arches.	II
Jasmin Cottage; 53.92246°N 1.24069°W	—	Mid 18th century	The house is in pinkish-brown brick, with a floor band, and a roof of pantile and stone slate. There are two storeys, two bays, and a rear outshut with a catslide roof. On the front is a doorway, the windows are casements, and all the openings have blocked elliptical heads.	II
Rose Dene; 53.92188°N 1.24011°W	—	Mid 18th century	The house is in pinkish-brown brick, with a cogged floor band, and a pantile roof with brick gable coping, There are two storeys and three bays, and an outshut in magnesian limestone. The doorway is in the centre, above it is a blocked opening, and the outer bays contain sash windows.	II
Pigeoncote, Healaugh Priory; 53.91109°N 1.26181°W	—	Late 18th century	The pigeoncote has two storeys, the ground floor is in magnesian limestone, the upper floor is in brick, and the roof is in pantile. In the ground floor are small wooden doors with round-arched openings between them. Inside, are brick nesting boxes.	II
Healaugh Manor West; 53.91073°N 1.26291°W		19th century	The house, which is built using earlier materials, is in magnesian limestone at the front, and in pinkish-brown brick and stone elsewhere, with an eaves corbel table and a swept tile roof. There are two storeys and three bays, with outshuts at the rear and on the left. The central doorway has a chamfered surround and a four-centred arched head, and the window above it has two trefoil-headed lights. The other windows have three lancet heads with chamfered mullions and surrounds. Various older fragments are incorporated in the front.	II
Barn, Healaugh Manor West; 53.91084°N 1.26264°W	—	19th century	The barn to the east of the house, which is built using earlier materials, is in magnesian limestone, brown brick and stone, and has a pantile roof. It contains a doorway with a chamfered surround and a four-centred arched head. Above it are three openings with double-chamfered surrounds and hood moulds, one is blocked, and the others contain casement windows.	II
Fircroft; 53.89063°N 1.26405°W		1894	A small country house, later used for other purposes, it is in stone, with sill bands and a floor band, and a slate roof with stone coped gables, kneelers and ball finials. There are two storeys and attics, and seven bays, the outer and middle bays projecting and gabled, and a single-storey service wing. In the centre is a projecting porch with a four-centred arched opening and a plaque above. The windows are cross windows, and in the attic they are mullioned. In the north front is an oriel window, and the south front contains a six-light stair window.	II
