= Ælfflæd of Whitby =

Abbess of Whitby

Saint Elflaeda of Whitby
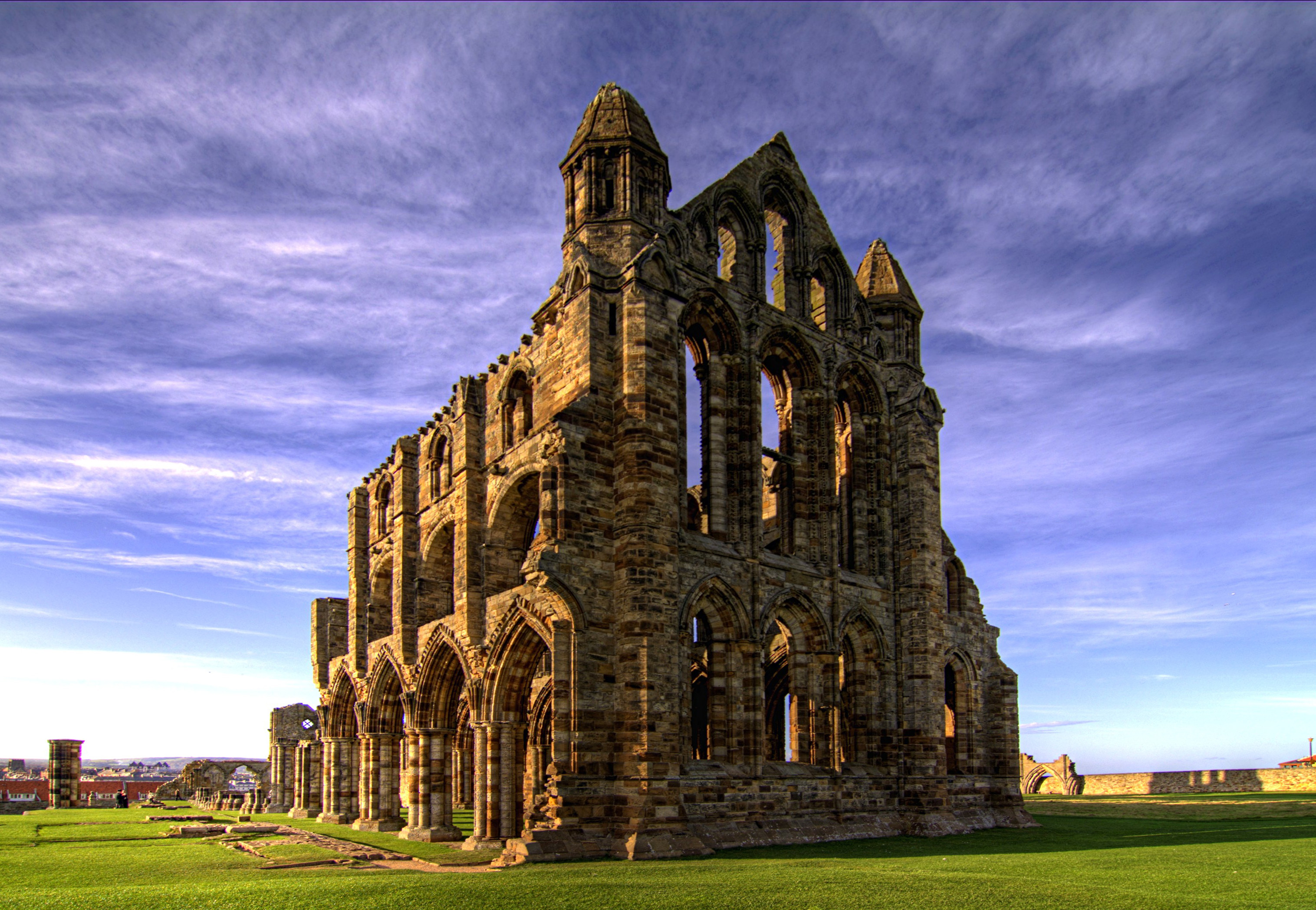
- Whitby Abbey
- Died: 714
- Feast: 8 February

Saint Ælfflæd (654–714) was the daughter of King Oswiu of Northumbria and Eanflæd. She was abbess of Whitby Abbey, an abbey of nuns that were known for their skills in medicine, from the death of her kinswoman Hilda in 680, first jointly with her mother, then alone. Ælfflæd was particularly known for her skills in surgery and her personal attention to patients, as was Hilda, who was known for her personalized medical care.

== Life ==
Most of Ælfflæd's life was spent as a nun. When she was about a year old, her father, King Oswiu of Northumbria, in thanksgiving for his victory over Penda of Mercia at the Battle of the Winwæd, handed her over to abbess Hilda to be brought up at Hartlepool Abbey. When Hilda left to found Whitby Abbey in 657 or 658, she brought Ælfflæd with her.

Upon Hilda's death in 680, Oswiu's widow, Eanflæd and their daughter Ælfflæd became joint abbesses and later in the 680s, Ælfflæd was sole abbess until her death in 714. The Northumbrian church of Cuthbert's time was a wealthy and aristocratic institution. On at least one occasion princess Abbess Ælfflæd is found banqueting with St. Cuthbert of Lindisfarne.

In the Life of St. Cuthbert, the saint assures Ælfflæd, who is concerned over the succession, that she will find Ecgfrith's successor 'to be a brother no less than the other one' (Anon. V. Cuthberti 3.6). Cuthbert then tells the puzzled Ælfflæd that this brother is 'on some island beyond this sea', at which point she realises that he is talking of Aldfrith 'who was then on the island which is called Iona' (Anon. V. Cuthberti 3.6). Like her mother, Ælfflæd was associated with Bishop Wilfrid, and played a large part in the settlement which placed her nephew Osred son of Aldfrith on the throne in 705. She was an important political figure from the death of her brother Ecgfrith in 685 until her death.

According to one account, Ælfflaed had been afflicted with a crippling disease for some time. One day she thought about Cuthbert and wished she had something belonging to him, for she was certain that would help her. Soon afterwards a messenger arrived with the gift of a linen girdle from Cuthbert. She put this on and within three days was restored to health.

One letter of Ælfflaed, to Adolana, abbess of Pfalzel, survives in the Bonifatian correspondence, which provides rare evidence for interaction between female religious leaders in the early medieval period. In this letter Ælfflaed seeks advice and assistance for a fellow abbess, who wished to go on pilgrimage to Rome, shedding light on Whitby's Continental connections in the years after Hilda's death.

Her piety was praised by contemporaries such as Bede and Stephen of Ripon. Bede refers to her high degree of holiness and devotion, while Stephen calls her the consoler of the whole kingdom and the best counsellor.

Ælfflæd was considered a saint and her feast day was celebrated on 8 February. She was buried at Whitby. A late hagiography, the Vita sanctae Elfledae, survives, collected in John Capgrave's Nova Legenda Angliae of 1516.

Excavations in the 1920s by Radford and Peers found several building foundations and two inscribed memorial stones believed to record the deaths of St. Ælfflaed, Abbess of Whitby, and Cyneburgh, queen of King Oswald.

== Sources ==
- "Ælfflæd 2". Prosopography of Anglo-Saxon England.
- Bede, Life of Cuthbert
- Lapidge, Michael, "Ælfflæd" in M. Lapidge, et al., (eds), The Blackwell Encyclopedia of Anglo-Saxon England. Oxford: Blackwell, 1999. ISBN 0-631-22492-0
