= Eanflæd =

7th-century Anglo-Saxon queen, abbess, and saint

- Queen of Northumbria (Deiran princess)
- Predecessor: Æthelburh of Kent
- Successor: Æthelthryth
- Born: 19 April 626; Deira area, Northumbria
- Died: after 685 (at least 59 years old); Whitby, Yorkshire
- Burial: Whitby Abbey (later Glastonbury Abbey ?)
- Issue: Ecgfrith of Northumbria; Osthryth; Ælfwine of Deira, Ælfflæd of Whitby
- Father: Edwin of Northumbria
- Mother: Æthelburh of Kent

Eanflæd (19 April 626 – after 685, also known as Enfleda) was a Deiran princess, queen of Northumbria and later, the abbess of Whitby Abbey, an influential Christian monastery in Whitby, England. She was the daughter of King Edwin of Northumbria and Æthelburg, who in turn was the daughter of King Æthelberht of Kent. In or shortly after 642 Eanflæd became the second wife of King Oswiu of Northumbria. After Oswiu's death in 670, she retired to Whitby Abbey, which had been founded by Hilda of Whitby. The monastery had strong associations with members of the Northumbrian royal family and played an important role in the establishment of Roman Christianity in England.

== Birth, baptism, exile ==
Eanflæd's mother had grown up as a Christian, but her father was an Anglo-Saxon pagan and he remained uncommitted to the new religion when she was born on the evening before Easter in 626 at a royal residence by the River Derwent. Bede recounts that earlier on the day that Eanflæd was born, an assassin sent by Cwichelm of Wessex made an attempt on Edwin's life. Afterward, Edwin, prompted by Æthelburg's bishop, Paulinus, agreed to Eanflæd's baptism and promised to become a Christian if he was granted a victory over Cwichhelm. Eanflæd was baptised, Bede says, on the feast of Pentecost (8 June 626) with eleven others of the royal household.

Edwin campaigned successfully against Cwichelm and adopted the new faith in 627. His reign ended in 633 with his defeat and death at the battle of Hatfield Chase. Fleeing the unsettled times which followed Edwin's death, Æthelburg, together with Bishop Paulinus, returned to Kent, where Eanflæd grew up under the protection of her uncle, King Eadbald of Kent.

== Return, marriage ==
In 642 Oswiu, King of Bernicia, head of the rival Northumbrian royal family, sent a priest named Utta to Kent, which then was ruled by Eanflæd's cousin, Eorcenberht, to ask for her hand in marriage. Oswiu already had been married, to a British princess, named Rieinmellt, but recently had become king on the death of his brother, Oswald, at the battle of Maserfield. King Penda of Mercia, the victor of Maserfield, dominated central Britain and Oswiu was in need of support. Marriage with Eanflæd would provide Kentish, and perhaps Frankish, support, and any children Oswiu and Eanflæd might have would have strong claims to all of Northumbria. The date of the marriage is not recorded.

Oswiu's marriage with Eanflæd was largely unsuccessful in ensuring the peaceful acceptance of his rule in Deira. By 644, Oswine, Eanflæd's paternal second cousin, was ruling in Deira. In 651 Oswine was killed by one of Oswiu's generals. To expiate the killing of his wife's kinsman, Oswiu founded Gilling Abbey at Gilling where prayers were said for both kings.

== Children, patron of Wilfrid, supporter of Rome ==
With varying degrees of certainty, Eanflæd's children with Oswiu are identified as Ecgfrith, Ælfwine, Osthryth, and Ælfflæd. Oswiu's complicated series of marriages and liaisons makes identifying the mother of each of his children difficult. Kirby states that Aldfrith, Ealhfrith, and Ealhflæd were not born to Eanflæd.

Eanflæd was the early patroness of Wilfrid, who played a large part in Northumbrian politics during the reigns of Ecgfrith, Aldfrith, and Osred, and elsewhere in seventh century Britain. When Wilfrid wished to travel on pilgrimage to Rome, the Queen recommended him to her cousin, the Kentish king Eorcenberht.

== Widow, abbess, saint ==
Saint Eanflæd
- Born: 19 April 626; Deira area, Northumbria
- Died: after 685; Whitby, Yorkshire
- Venerated in: Catholic Church; Eastern Orthodox Church
- Canonized: Pre-Congregation
- Feast: 24 November

Perhaps several years after Oswiu's death, Eanflæd retired to the monastery at Whitby. This monastery was closely associated with her royal family and many members were buried there. Divisions within the Northumbrian church led to the Synod of Whitby held at this monastery in 664, during which Oswiu had agreed to settle a calendar controversy about Easter by adopting the Roman dating method. Whitby Abbey was a double monastery, housing the nuns and monks in separate quarters although they shared the church and religious rites. Following the death of her kinswoman and the founding abbess of the monastery, Hild, in 680 Eanflæd became abbess jointly with her daughter Ælfflæd. She remained there until her death, during in the reign of her stepson, Aldfrith (685–704). During this time, the remains of King Edwin were reburied at Whitby.

Some late sources give the feast day of Eanflæd as 24 November. Along with Edwin, Oswiu, Hilda, and later, Ælfflæd, she was buried at Whitby. William of Malmesbury believed that her remains later had been removed to Glastonbury Abbey, where a monument to her was said to exist in the twelfth century.
