= Hilda of Whitby =

Christian saint (c. 614–680)

Saint Hilda of Whitby
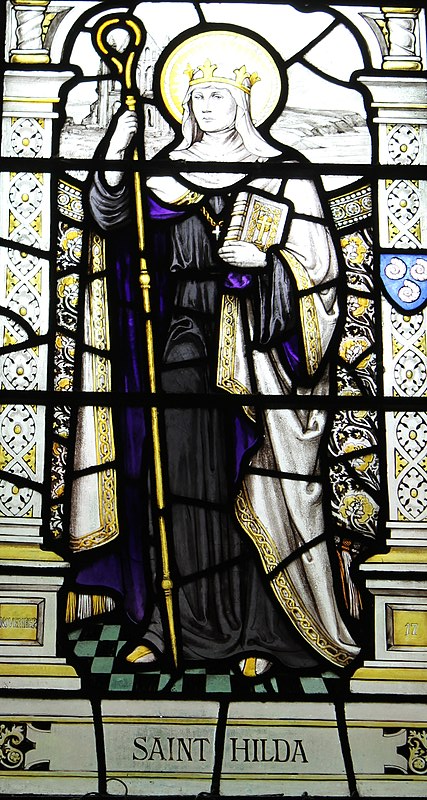
- St. Hilda as depicted in a stained glass window in Chester Cathedral

Virgin
- Born: c. 614; Kingdom of Deira
- Died: 17 November 680; Whitby Abbey, Northumbria
- Venerated in: Anglican Communion; Roman Catholic Church; Eastern Orthodox Church
- Canonized: Pre-Congregation
- Feast: 17, 18 or 19 November; In the Anglican Use, her feast is on 23 June
- Attributes: Coiled snake (ammonite), crozier of an abbess, model of Whitby Abbey

Hilda of Whitby (or Hild; c. 614 – 17 November 680) was a saint of the early Church in Britain. She was the founder and first abbess of the monastery at Whitby which was chosen as the venue for the Synod of Whitby in 664. An important figure in the Christianisation of Anglo-Saxon England, she was abbess in several convents and recognised for the wisdom that drew kings to her for advice.

The source of information about Hilda is the Ecclesiastical History of the English People by Bede in 731, who was born approximately eight years before her death.

== Early life ==
According to Bede, Hilda was born in 614 into the Deiran royal household. She was the second daughter of Hereric, nephew of Edwin, King of Deira, and his wife, Breguswīþ. When Hilda was still an infant, her father was poisoned while in exile at the court of the Brittonic king of Elmet in what is now West Yorkshire. In 616, Edwin, fighting alongside Rædwald of East Anglia with whom he sought protection, defeated Æthelfrith, the son of Æthelric of Bernicia, in battle. He created the Kingdom of Northumbria and took its throne. Hilda was brought up at King Edwin's court.

In 625, the widowed Edwin married the Christian princess Æthelburh of Kent, daughter of King Æthelberht of Kent and the Merovingian princess Bertha of Kent. As part of the marriage contract, Aethelburh was allowed to continue her Roman Christian worship and was accompanied to Northumbria with her chaplain, Paulinus of York, a Roman monk sent to England in 601 to assist Augustine of Canterbury. Augustine's mission in England was based in Kent, and is referred to as the Gregorian mission after the pope who sent him. As queen, Æthelburh continued to practise her Christianity and no doubt influenced her husband's thinking as her mother Bertha had influenced her father.

In 627, King Edwin was baptised on Easter Day, 12 April, along with his entire court, which included the 13-year-old Hilda, in a small wooden church hastily constructed for the occasion near the site of the present York Minster.

In 633, Northumbria was overrun by the neighbouring pagan King of Mercia, at which time King Edwin fell in battle. Paulinus accompanied Hilda and Queen Æthelburh and her companions to the Queen's home in Kent. Queen Æthelburh founded a convent at Lyminge and it is assumed that Hilda remained with the Queen-Abbess.

Hilda's elder sister, Hereswith, married Ethelric, brother of King Anna of East Anglia, who with all of his daughters became renowned for their Christian virtues. Later, Hereswith became a nun at Chelles Abbey in Gaul (modern France). Bede resumes Hilda's story at a point when she was about to join her widowed sister at Chelles Abbey. At the age of 33, Hilda decided instead to answer the call of Bishop Aidan of Lindisfarne and returned to Northumbria to live as a nun.

== Abbess ==
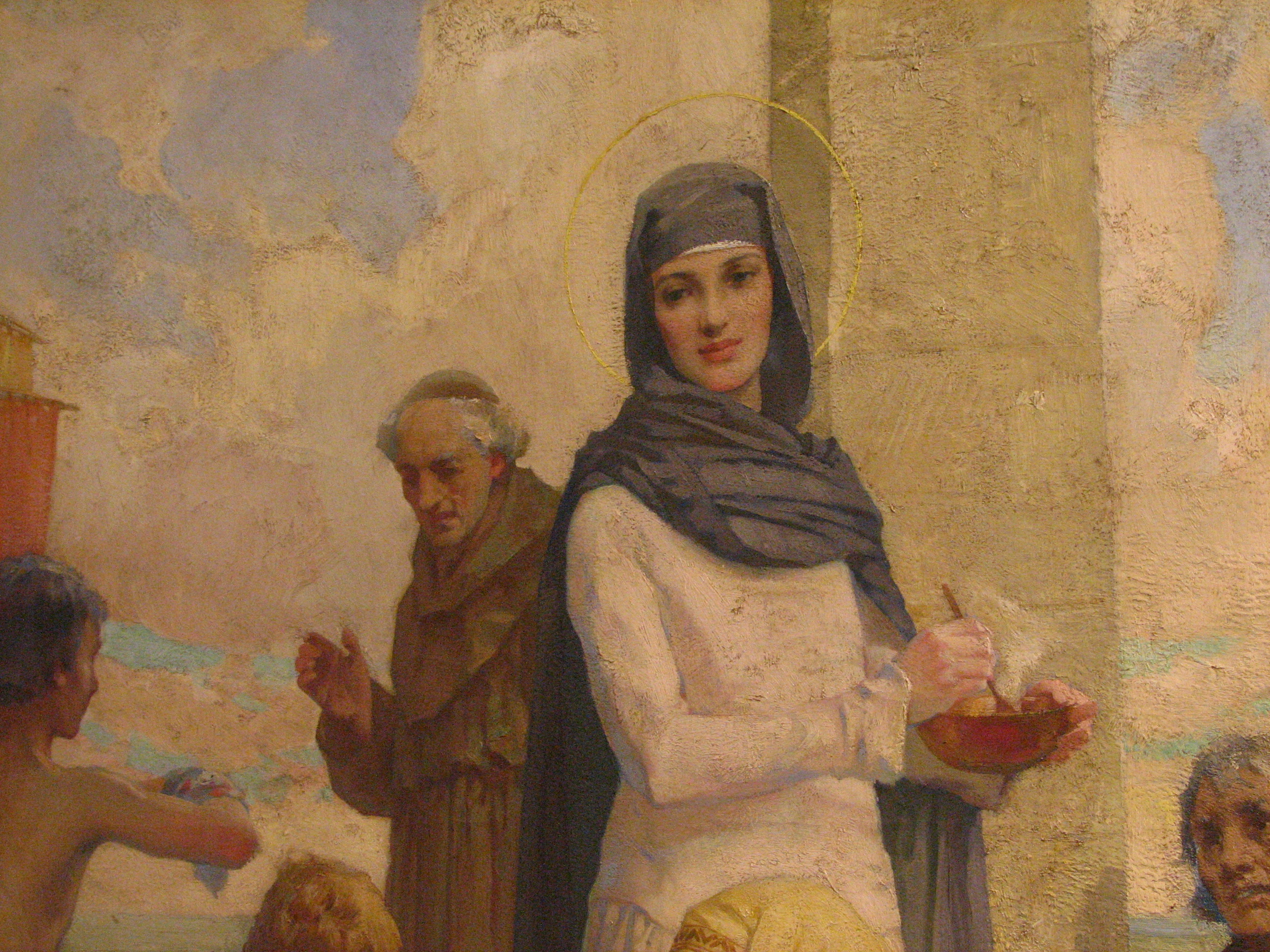
Saint Hilda at Hartlepool by James Clark (oil painting)

Hilda's original convent is not known except that it was on the north bank of the River Wear. Here, with a few companions, she learned the traditions of Celtic monasticism, which Bishop Aidan brought from Iona. After a year Aidan appointed Hilda as the second abbess of Hartlepool Abbey. No trace remains of this abbey, but its monastic cemetery has been found near the present St Hilda's Church, Hartlepool.

In 657 Hilda became the founding abbess of Whitby Abbey, then known as Streoneshalh; she remained there until her death.

Archaeological evidence shows that her monastery was in the Celtic style, with its members living in small houses, each for two or three people. The tradition in double monasteries, such as Hartlepool and Whitby, was that men and women lived separately but worshipped together in church. The exact location and size of the church associated with this monastery is unknown.

Bede states that the original ideals of monasticism were maintained strictly in Hilda's abbey. All property and goods were held in common; Christian virtues were exercised, especially peace and charity. Everyone had to study the Bible and do good works.

Five men from this monastery later became bishops. Two, John of Beverley, Bishop of Hexham and Wilfrid, Bishop of York, were canonized for their service to the Christian church at a critical period in its fight against paganism.

== Character ==
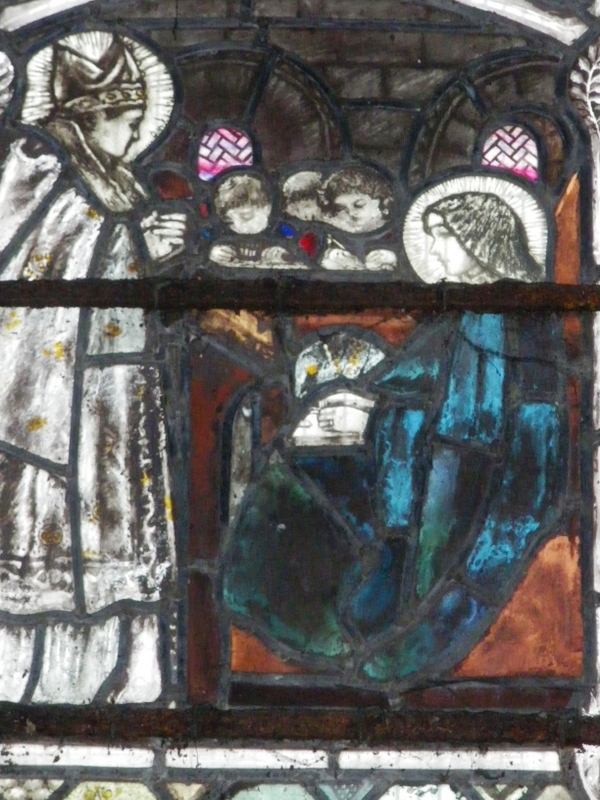
Aidan of Lindisfarne visits Hilda. Gloucester Cathedral, by Christopher Whall.

Bede describes Hilda as a woman of great energy, who was a skilled administrator and teacher. As a landowner she had many in her employ to care for sheep and cattle, farming, and woodcutting. She gained such a reputation for wisdom that kings and princes sought her advice. However, she also had a concern for ordinary folk such as Cædmon. He was a herder at the monastery, who was inspired in a dream to sing verses in praise of God. Hilda recognized his gift and encouraged him to develop it. Bede writes, "All who knew her called her mother because of her outstanding devotion and grace".

== Synod of Whitby ==
The prestige of Whitby is reflected in the fact that King Oswiu of Northumberland chose Hilda's monastery as the venue for the Synod of Whitby, the first synod of the Church in his kingdom. He invited churchmen from as far away as Wessex to attend the synod. Most of those present, including Hilda, accepted the King's decision to adopt the method of calculating Easter currently used in Rome, establishing Roman practice as the norm in Northumbria. The monks from Lindisfarne, who would not accept this, withdrew to Iona, and later to Ireland.

== Illness and death ==
Hilda suffered from a fever for the last seven years of her life, but she continued to work until her death on 17 November 680 AD, at what was then the advanced age of sixty-six. In her last year she set up another monastery, fourteen miles from Whitby, at Hackness. She died after receiving viaticum, and her legend holds that at the moment of her death the bells of the monastery of Hackness tolled. A nun there named Begu claimed to have witnessed Hilda's soul being borne to heaven by angels.

== Legends ==
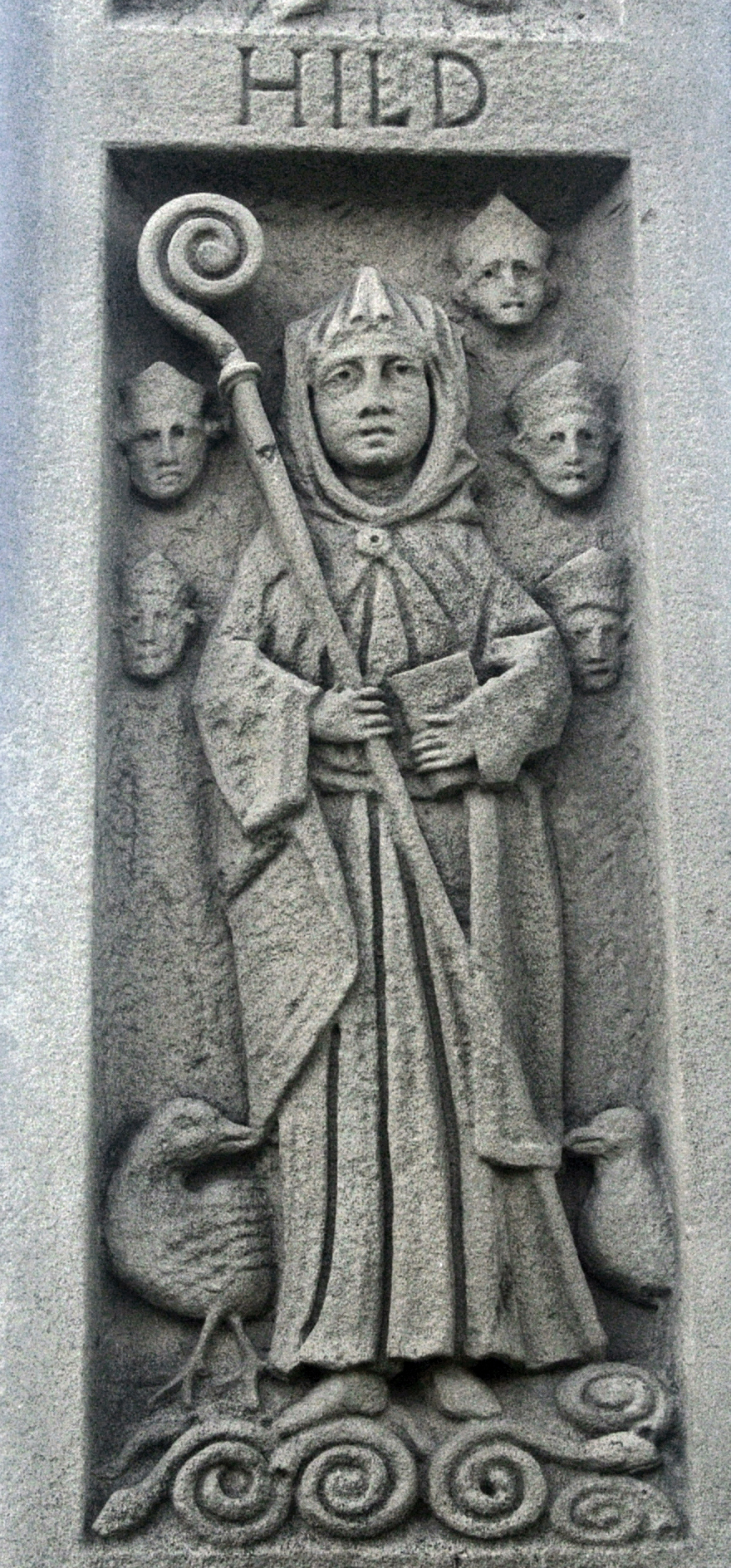
St. Hilda monument detail in Whitby. Note ammonites at feet.

A local legend says that when sea birds fly over the abbey they dip their wings in honour of Saint Hilda. Another legend tells of a plague of snakes which Hilda turned to stone, supposedly explaining the presence of ammonite fossils on the shore. Local artisans carved snakes' heads onto ammonites, and sold these as relics, "evidence" of her miracle. The ammonite genus Hildoceras takes its scientific name from St. Hilda. The coat of arms of nearby Whitby includes three such 'snakestones', and depictions of ammonites appear in the shield of the University of Durham's College of St Hild and St Bede.

A carved ammonite stone is set into the wall by the entrance to the former chapel of St Hild's College, Durham, which later became part of the College of St Hild and St Bede. The coat of arms of St. Hilda's College, Oxford, includes a curled snake, and the ammonite is used by the college as a symbol.

== Veneration ==
The veneration of Hilda from an early period is attested by the inclusion of her name in the calendar of Saint Willibrord, written at the beginning of the 8th century. According to one tradition, her relics were translated to Glastonbury by King Edmund; another tradition holds that Saint Edmund brought her relics to Gloucester.

In the Roman Catholic Church, the feast day of Saint Hilda is 17 November. In some parts of the Anglican Communion, her feast, a Lesser Festival, is on 18 November, while in some others, such as the Anglican Church of Australia, it is on 17 November. In the Church of England however, it is kept on 19 November. In the Eastern Orthodox Church, her feast day is also 17 November.

In the calendar approved for formerly Anglican Personal Ordinariate and Pastoral Provision parishes in the Roman Catholic Church, the feast day of Saint Hilda is celebrated on 23 June, together with those of Saint Ethelreda, Abbess of Ely (died 679), and Saint Mildred, Abbess of Minster-in-Thanet (died ca. 700).

== Patronage ==
Hilda of Whitby is considered one of the patron saints of learning and culture, including poetry, due to her patronage of Cædmon. Saint Hilda is the patron saint of the National Cathedral School for Girls in Washington, D.C.

In addition, St Hilda's College, Oxford, established in 1893 for female students, remained with that status for more than 100 years, before turning co-educational when it was deemed that the percentage of women studying at Oxford had risen to near 50 per cent. The symbol of the college is the ammonite of St Hilda. During the centenary, 100 silver ammonites were created to honour the achievements of St. Hilda and the college's female students during its first 100 years. These now are owned by alumnae of the college .

== Iconography ==
Saint Hilda is generally depicted with a pastoral staff and carrying an abbey church. Often, there are ammonites at her feet.

== Legacy ==
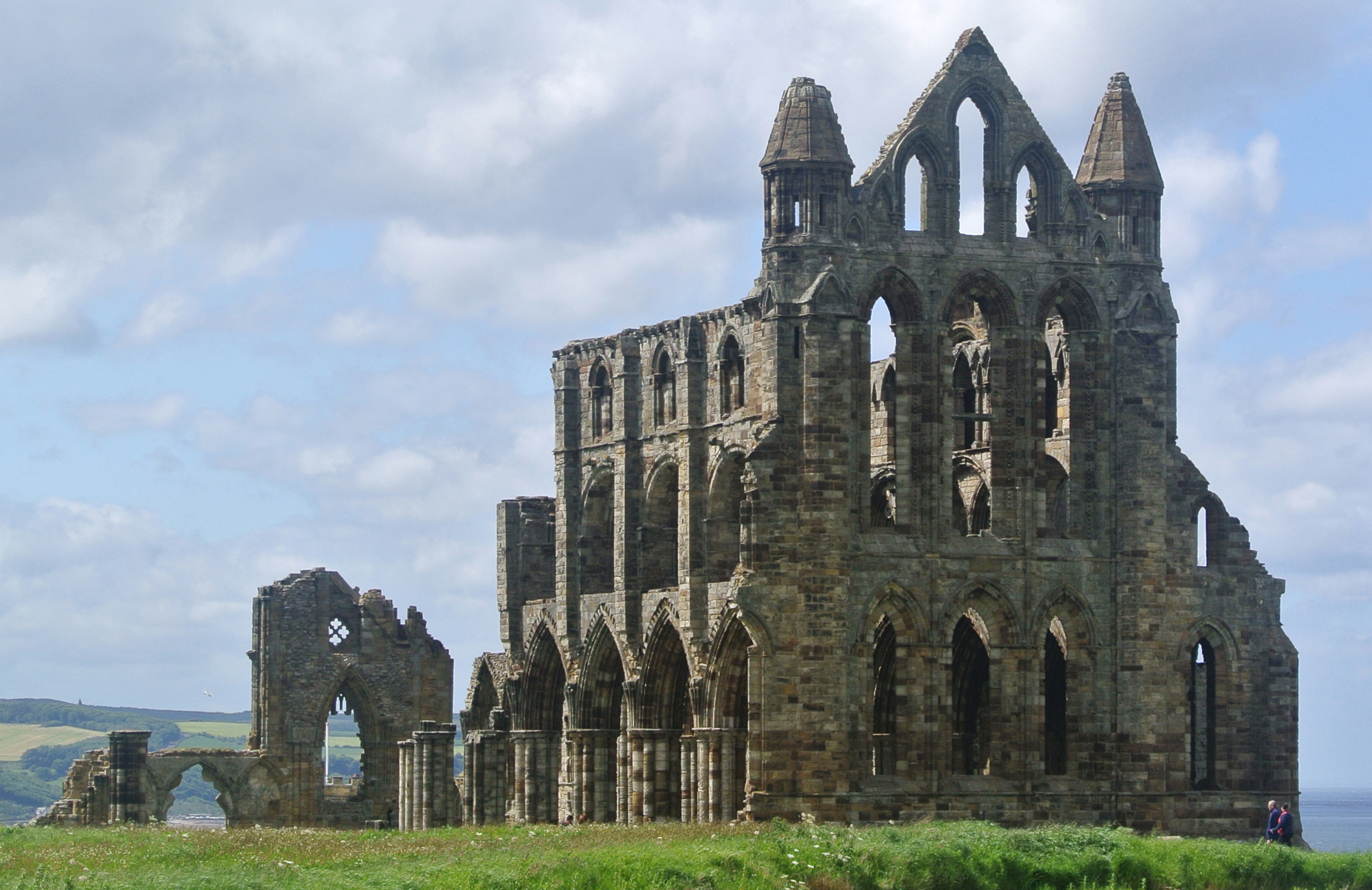
Whitby Abbey

=== Whitby Abbey ===
Hilda was succeeded as abbess by Eanflæd, widow of King Oswiu, and their daughter, Ælfflæd. From then onward we know nothing about the abbey at Whitby until it was destroyed by the Danish invaders in 867. After the Norman conquest that began in 1066 AD, monks from Evesham re-founded the abbey as a Benedictine house for men. Thus it continued until the Dissolution of the Monasteries by Henry VIII in 1539.

There is said to be the wraith of St Hilda, who appears in the ruins wrapped in a shroud, and the bells of the abbey can be heard ringing under the water, where they sank with the ship taking them to London after the abbey was dismantled.

=== Churches ===
Two churches in Whitby (Roman Catholic and Anglican), have been dedicated under her patronage and another, in Bilsborrow, Lancashire.

Other Anglican Churches dedicated to St Hilda in Northern England include St Hilda's Church, South Shields, one in the Cross Green area of Leeds, one in the Prestwich Area of Manchester, one in the Stretford Area of Manchester, and another in Jesmond, Newcastle upon Tyne. It was opened in September 1882. An orthodox Christian church dedicated to her is due to open in Halifax West Yorkshire in 2025.There is a statue of St Hilda in the nave, depicting her as the Mother of her Abbey at Whitby. She also appears in a stained glass window at the east end of the church. The church still is active and a sung mass is held there every Sunday. Several small streets in the immediate area are named after the church—St Hilda's Mount, St Hilda's Road, among them. St Hilda's Church, Crofton Park, in the Diocese of Southwark, is also dedicated to St Hilda.

=== Religious communities ===
A community of Anglican sisters, the Order of the Holy Paraclete was founded in 1915 at St Hilda's Priory, on the western edge of Whitby town. More recently, the Community of St Aidan and St Hilda has been founded on Lindisfarne.

A group of Anglo-Catholic deaconesses founded in 1910 by Fr Frederick Burgess lived on the grounds of Christ Church, New Haven, Connecticut, in a house they called St Hilda's House. The deaconesses of St Hilda's House served the church, the children of the church school, and the poor and orphaned of New Haven until the early 1970s operating a free medicine clinic, soup kitchen and many other ministries. Today, St Hilda's House-Episcopal Service Corps program at Christ Church New Haven has retained the name, and part of the legacy of the St Hilda's deaconesses.

=== Educational institutions ===
St Hilda has become the patron of many schools and colleges all over the world. The College of St Hild and St Bede, Durham, St Hild's Church of England School, Hartlepool, St Hilda's College, Oxford and St Hilda's Collegiate School, Dunedin are named after Saint Hilda. A stone from the 13th century ruins of Whitby Abbey where St Hilda founded the Monastery of Streoneshalh c. 657AD was donated to St Hilda's College (University of Melbourne) by the Whitby Urban Council. This stone is located at the college entrance.

St. Hilda's College, University of Toronto is the women's college of University of Trinity College. Saint Hilda is honoured as co-patron (with Our Lady). Daily services are held in the Lady Chapel by Trinity's Faculty of Divinity.

St Hilda's Diocesan High School is an Anglican boarding school for girls in Brown's Town, St. Ann, Jamaica, founded by Canon James Philip Hall, Rector of St. Mark's Anglican Church in Brown's Town 1906-07. St. Hilda's College in Buenos Aires, Argentina was founded in 1912.

There are two schools situated in Australia in recognition of St. Hilda. They are both 'St. Hilda's Anglican School for Girls' which is an independent, girls' school in Southport, Queensland, and Mosman Park, Western Australia.

=== Fiction ===
Hilda appears as a main character in the 1994 novel Absolution by Murder, the first book in Peter Tremayne's Sister Fidelma mysteries.

Hilda appears as a main character in Melvyn Bragg's 1996 novel Credo.

The 2013 novel Hild and 2023 sequel Menewood by Nicola Griffith is based on the life of Hilda.

Maureen Duffy's play The Choice premiered at the Jermyn Street Theatre in 2018. This monologue sees Hilda recount two episodes of her life that are recorded by Bede: the 'miracle' of the poet-cowherd Caedmon, and the role Hilda played in the transition from Irish to Roman Catholicism in the English church.

Vibeke Vasbo's 1991 Danish novel Hildas sang has been translated into English by Gaye Kynoch and published as The Song of Hild.

Religious titles
New title	Abbess of Whitby; AD 657 - 680	Succeeded by Eanflæd
New title	Abbess of Whitby; AD 657 - 680	Succeeded by Ælfflæd
