= Lyminge Abbey =

Abbey in Kent, England

Coordinates: 51°7′34″N 1°5′12″E

Lyminge Abbey was an abbey about four miles northwest of Folkestone on the south coast of Kent. It was one of the first religious houses to be founded in England.

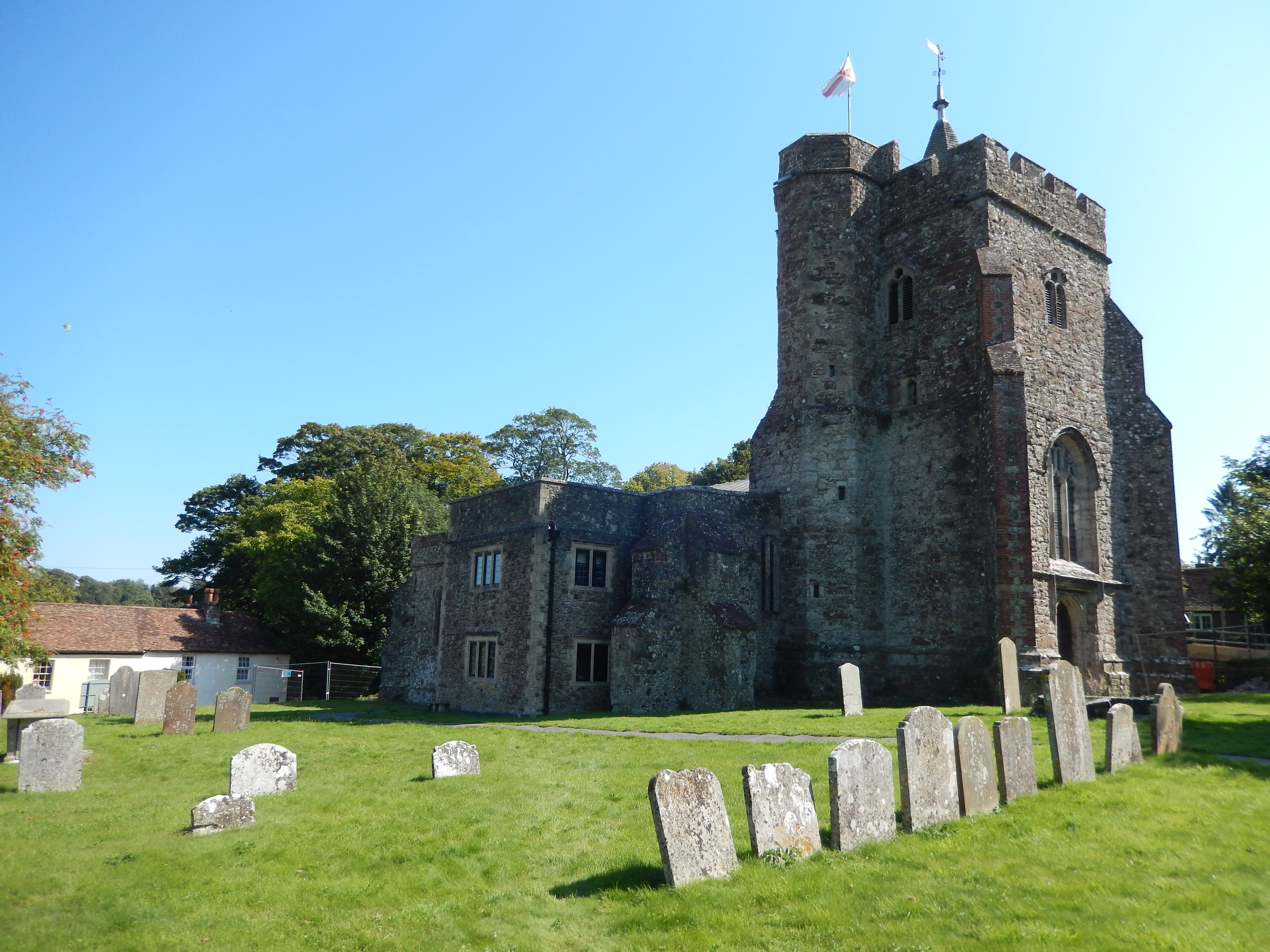
The 10th cent Church of St Mary and St Ethelburga on the Abbey site

== History ==
Æthelburh of Kent (Ethelburga) was the daughter of the Christian King Æthelberht of Kent. She married King Edwin of Northumbria in 625, an important event in the transmission of Christianity from Kent to the north of England as his conversion was a condition of their marriage. After Edwin was killed at the Battle of Hatfield Chase in 633, Ethelburga returned to Kent to become abbess of a new nunnery and convent at Lyminge. When she died in 647 she was venerated as a saint. Lyminge suffered from numerous Viking raids due to its particular vulnerability, and its people were subsequently taken refuge for protection in the city of Canterbury by 804.

The exact location of the abbey is not known but is believed to be around Lyminge church, which is dedicated to St Mary and St Ethelburga.
