= Flavius Sanctus =

Flavius Sanctus was a governor of the province of Rutupine (now Richborough Castle), of Roman Britain during the mid fourth century AD. Part of the Gallo-Roman aristocracy, he may have descended from a Sanctus, member of the Gallic Empire.

It was also believed he may have been a commander at Regulbium and Richborough Castle but he may have simply lived there. Roman emperor Constans appointed a Roman emperor whose name is unknown and was eventually replaced by Sanctus. Sanctus married Namia Pudentilla, a sister of Ausonius's wife's and Sanctus was praised in one of Ausonius's poems.

Aside from being a Christian, not many details about him are known.
