= Hartlepool Abbey =

Former monastery in Hartlepool, County Durham, England

- Location within County Durham

Monastery information
- Established: 640CE
- Disestablished: c.800CE

People
- Founders: Hieu, Aidan of Lindisfarne
- Important associated figures: Ælfflæd of Whitby, Hilda of Whitby

Site
- Coordinates: 54°41′42.43″N 1°10′53.59″W
- Grid reference: NZ5285033650

Hartlepool Abbey, also known as Heretu Abbey, Hereteu Abbey, Heorthu Abbey or Herutey Abbey, was a Northumbrian monastery founded in 640 CE by Hieu, the first of the saintly recluses of Northumbria, and Aidan of Lindisfarne, on what is now the Headland Estate of Hartlepool called the Heugh or Old Hartlepool, in County Durham, England.

== Construction and type ==
Built in the early Anglo-Saxon style, it was likely a walled enclosure of simple wooden huts surrounding a church.

Hartlepool was a double monastery. It was a joint-house of both monks and nuns, presided over from 640 to 649 by Hieu, the first female abbess to ever be put in charge of such an institution. Hilda ruled men and women, Bede speaks of male students in the monasteries of the Abbess Hilda, and there are male names on the head stones, and male interments in the cemetery.

Most of the priests were from the Celtic church who had travelled to Northumbria from Ireland or the island of Iona. Others had arrived as part of the Pope's mission to Britain.

== History ==
Hieu was selected by Bishop Aidan of Lindisfarne in 640 to found and run a new abbey at Hereteu. After Hieu left for Tadcaster in 649, Hilda (later Hilda of Whitby) was appointed second abbess of the abbey by Bishop Aidan.

When she arrived, there were some serious problems with the monks living there. Hilda organised it so that everyone had to pray, work and rest according to a clear timetable.

In 655, King Oswiu of Northumbria sent his one-year-old daughter Ælfflæd to stay with Hilda, "to be consecrated to God in perpetual virginity", an important gesture. Hilda stayed at Hartlepool Abbey until 657 or 658 when at Aidans behest she became founding abbess of Whitby Abbey, then called Streoneshalh, taking with her Ælfflæd and ten nuns. Hilda was now technically abbess of both monasteries, but she lived at Streaneshalh.

The monastery then disappears from history, and it is possible that it either ceased to operate or that it moved to and became the nucleus of Hilda's new foundation.

== Impact ==
A village was founded around the monastery in the 7th century, marking the earliest beginnings of the modern town of Hartlepool. However, after Hilda left Hartlepool Abbey it, and the village surrounding it, is not mentioned again in any known sources until the 12th century, and appears to have declined in importance until it was finally either sacked and destroyed by Danish Vikings around 800, or possibly simply abandoned.

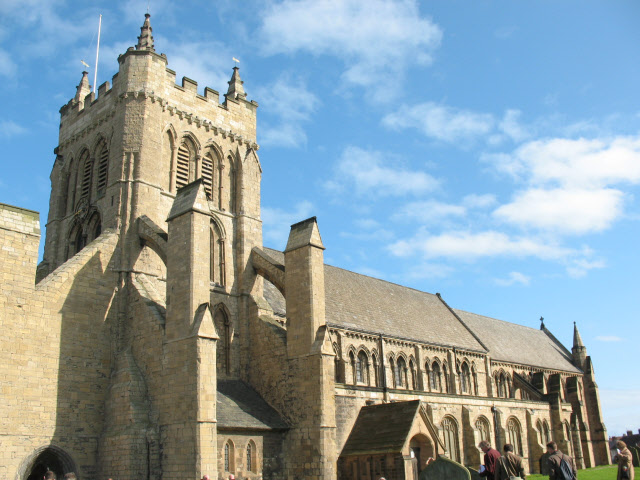
St Hilda's Church, Hartlepool. Built on the site of the medieval Hartlepool Abbey.

== List of abbesses ==
Name	Date appointed Abbess	Date Left	Notes	went to
Hieu	640AD	649AD	Founder of Abbey	Tadcaster
Hilda	649AD	658AD		Whitby Abbey

== Excavations ==
=== 1883 ===
No trace of the monastery remains today, though the monastic cemetery has been found near the site of present-day St Hilda's Church. It is the most extensively explored of all the Northumbrian monasteries of the 7th and 8th centuries. The first excavation began in 1833 when workmen building houses on the headland found human burials and Anglo-Saxon artefacts.

Multiple female skeletons were found lying in two rows at a depth of 3.5 feet. Unusually for Christian burials, the bodies were aligned north to south. Their heads were upon flat stones as pillows with larger stones inscribed with Anglo-Saxon runes and crosses above. One of the namestones found during this excavation can be found on display in St Hilda's Church. In consultation with the British Archaeological Association, several were identified. These included Heresuid and Bregesuid (or Breguswith), respectively the sister and the mother of St Hilda, Frigyd, the abbess of Hackness, and Hildilid, Eadgyd and Torchtgyd, respectively abbess and nuns of Barking Abbey.

=== 2000, Time Team ===
Significant finds are still being unearthed to this day. Hartlepool Abbey was featured in the March 2000 episode #57 of archaeological television programme Time Team, called "Nuns in Northumbria", where bones and a book clasp were found.
