= Healaugh Park Priory =

Priory in Healaugh, Selby, England

Coordinates: 53°54′40″N 1°15′45″W

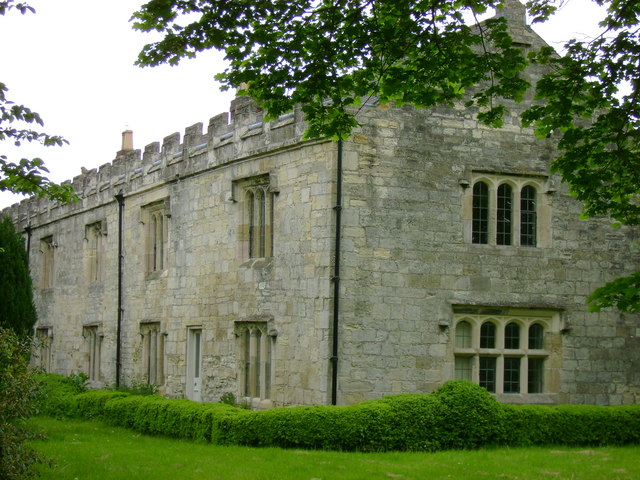
Healaugh Priory

Healaugh Park Priory was an Augustinian priory in Healaugh, North Yorkshire, England, some 2 miles (3 km) north of Tadcaster.

The present building is a two-storey construction of Magnesian limestone ashlar, with Welsh slate roof and brick chimney stacks and is Grade II* listed.

The Priory of St. John the Evangelist was established in 1218 by Jordan de Santa Maria and his wife, Alice at the site now called Healaugh Manor Farm. Alice was the granddaughter of Bertram Haget, who had previously granted the lands outside the village for a hermitage to Gilbert, a monk of Marmoutier. Further land was donated to the priory by the de Acklams and de Boyntons.

The priory was finally dissolved in 1535, during the period of the Dissolution of the Monasteries, at which time there were fourteen canons in residence, with a revenue of £86 5s. 9d. In 1540 the property came into the possession of James Gage, who passed it on to Sir Arthur D'Arcy, after which it became the residence of the Barons Wharton. It was later acquired by Stamp Brooksbank, MP and Governor of the Bank of England, and descended in the Brooksbank family to Sir Edward Clitherow Brooksbank, 1st Baronet. Two of his three sons were killed in the First World War and the other in a motorcycle accident. Healaugh was disposed of around this time.

The remains of the priory served for some time as a manor house, after which it became a farmhouse, with parts of the monastic building incorporated into the later buildings. A moated enclosure surrounding the building and associated fishponds belonged to either the monastic or manor house period.

== Burials ==
- Bryan Stapleton and his wife Alice

== See also ==
- Brooksbank baronets
- Stamp Brooksbank
- Grade II* listed buildings in North Yorkshire (district)
- Listed buildings in Healaugh, Selby
