= Adelfius =

4th-century Romano-British bishop

- Uncertain
- Diocese: Uncertain

Personal details
- Denomination: Catholic

Adelfius (fl. 314) was a Romano-British bishop, possibly from Londinium (London), Lindum (Lincoln), Camulodunum (Colchester) or Legionensium (Caerleon), who was part of the British delegation who attended the church council held at Arles, in Gaul, in AD 314.

== Council of Arles (314) ==
The first council of Arles was the first council called by Constantine, and took place in Arelate, Gaul in 314, a year after the Edict of Milan which made Christianity a legal religion.

The list of those who signed the Acta – the decisions made by the Council – included three bishops from Britain, along with a presbyter and a deacon. W. H. C. Frend in the Dictionary of National Biography says that the presbyter and deacon were accompanying Adelfius, suggesting his was the senior see.

This list only survives in later manuscript copies, the oldest and best of which (the Corbie Codex, from the 6th or 7th century) names the British bishops as:

- Eborius "de civitate Eboracensi" – from the city of Eboracum (York);
- Restitutus "de civitate Londenensi" – from the city of Londinium (London);
- Adelfius "de civitate Colonia Londenensium" – that is, from the "colonia of the people of London".

The Toulouse codex lists Adelfius as simply "ex civitate Colonia".

== Letter to Pope Sylvester ==
Haddan and Stubbs note that Adelfius also appears as a signatory to a synodal letter to Pope Sylvester I; however, his see is not mentioned.

== Uncertainty regarding see ==
It has been generally agreed that the surviving copies of the Acta of the Council of Arles must be corrupt in assigning two bishops to London.

Since London was not a colonia (Note: Richmond identifies four coloniae – in Roman Britain – Camulodunum (Colchester), Lindum (Lincoln) Eboracum (York) and Glevum (Gloucester) – though Howorth says the identification of Lindum is suspect) - suspicion has fallen on the place of origin of Adelfius, listed as bishop of the "colonia of the people of London".

Most authorities have suggested emending "Colonia Londenensium" to "Colonia Lindensium" – the colonia of the people of Lindum (Lincoln).

Others, including Haddan and Stubbs and the 1885 Dictionary of National Biography, proposed reading the location as Legionensium (Caerleon-on-Usk), though Miller disputed this as this was also not a colonia, and seemed an unlikely place to give rise to a bishop.

S. N. Miller considered that the word "colonia" was also suspect, noting that although many other coloniae had sent bishops to Arles, including York as well as Cologne, Trier and Lyon, none had been designated "colonia" in the list. Miller argued that "de civitate Colonia Londenensium" was a mistake for "de civitate Camu/lodunensium" – "the city of the people of Camulodunum" (Colchester). This view was supported by archaeologist Sir Ian Richmond.

== In popular culture ==
Adelfius is portrayed as a character in the play Aaron and Julia by Oliver Myers, set in Roman Caerleon.

== See also ==
- Early Christianity in Britain
- Celtic Christianity
