= Restitutus =

4th-century Bishop of London

- Bishop of London?
- Diocese: Diocese of London?
- Predecessor: unknown
- Successor: unknown

Personal details
- Denomination: Nicaean Christianity

Restitutus (fl. 314) was a Romano-British bishop, probably from Londinium (London), one of the British delegation who attended the church synod or Council held at Arles (Arelate), in Gaul, in AD 314.

The list of those who signed the Acta, the decisions made by the council, included three bishops, along with a "presbyter" and a "deacon", from Britain. The British bishops were Eborius "de civitate Eboricensi" – from the city of Eboracum (York); Restitutus "de civitate Londenensi" – from the city of Londinium (London); and Adelfius "de civitate Colonia Londenensium" – from the "colonia of the people of London".

The text, which survives only in a number of later manuscript copies, is clearly corrupt in assigning two bishops to London. Since London was not a colonia, most authorities have agreed that Adelfius' see is misrecorded, with proposed alternatives including Lindum (Lincoln) or Camulodunum (Colchester).

Notwithstanding the debate about the role of Adelfius, it seems most probable that the identification of Restitutus as Bishop of London was correct. However, no more is known about him, nor about his predecessors and successors in the Romano-British see of London. His name does not appear in the list of supposed early "Archbishops of London" that the 16th-century historian John Stow attributed to Jocelin of Furness. Stow himself noted this anomaly, and the fact that Restitutus was listed as a bishop and not an archbishop; this, he felt, cast doubt on the authenticity of the list of archbishops. Later writers attempted to reconcile the two sources, usually by inserting Restitutus into "Jocelin's" list, either between Hilarius and Guitelinus, or after Guitelinus.

== See also ==
- List of bishops of London
- Early Christianity in Britain
- Celtic Christianity
