= Eborius =

- Bishop of Eboracum
- Term ended: after 314
- Predecessor: unknown
- Successor: unknown

Personal details
- Died: after 314

Eborius or Eburius (fl. 314) is the first bishop of Eboracum (the later York) known by name.

== Biography ==
Eborius is only mentioned as one of the three bishops from Roman Britain attending the Council of Arles in 314. That council was convoked by Constantine the Great with the special object of settling the question of the Bishopric of Carthage, disputed between Cyprian and Donatus. Among the bishops from ‘the Gauls’ present at the council was ‘Eborius episcopus de civitate Eboracensi, provincia Britanniæ.’ Although suspicious, the similarity between the names Eborius and Eboracum can be explained if the bishop's actual name was Ivor, a common Welsh name which can easily be Latinised into Eborius.

The other two British bishops at Arles were ‘Restitutus, episcopus de civitate Londinensi’ (London) and ‘Adelfius episcopus de civitate colonia Londinensium.’ The latter name has variously been read as Lindum (Lincoln) or Camulodunum (Colchester). A presbyter and a deacon, ‘Sacerdos presbyter’ and ‘Arminius diaconus,’ also attended the council with Adelfius, which suggests, according to W.H.C. Frend, that he held seniority among the three bishops. Jeremy Knight states that the bishops all represented different provinces of Roman Britain, and thus the priest and deacon may have been at Arles to represent Britannia Prima.

The mention of these names is the most definite piece of evidence of the existence of an organised Christian church in the Roman province of Britain, and of its close dependence on the church of Gaul. Among the canons they subscribed was one fixing a single day for the celebration of Easter throughout the world. So that the different custom of the British church on that question had not yet arisen. The above facts are in Labbe's ‘Concilia’ from a Corvey MS., and Isidorus Mercator's list substantially agrees in including ‘Eburius,’ though it describes him only as ‘ex provincia Britanniæ’. The passage is wrongly punctuated in Migne's edition; but in Crabbe the reading is ‘ex provincia Bizacena, civitate Tubernicensi, Eburius episcopus.’ Tillemont conjecturally identifies Eborius with the Hibernius who joins in a synodal letter to Pope Sylvester I, but this seems quite arbitrary.

== See also ==
- Archbishop of York
- Early Christianity in Britain
- Celtic Christianity
