= Healaugh, Selby =

Village and civil parish in North Yorkshire, England

Coordinates: 53°55′25″N 1°14′28″W

Healaugh
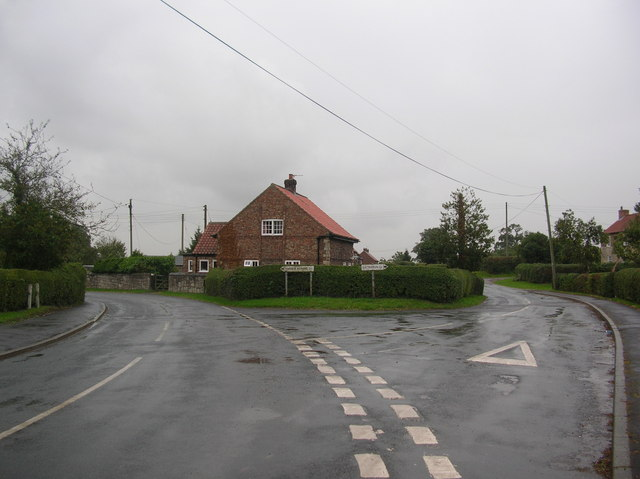
- Junction in Healaugh

- Location within North Yorkshire
- Population: 249 (Including Catterton.)
- OS grid reference: SE 49963 47711
  - London: 204 mi (328 km) SSE
- Civil parish: Healaugh
- Unitary authority: North Yorkshire
- Ceremonial county: North Yorkshire
- Region: Yorkshire and the Humber
- Country: England
- Sovereign state: United Kingdom
- Post town: Tadcaster
- Postcode district: LS24
- Dialling code: 01904
- Police: North Yorkshire
- Fire: North Yorkshire
- Ambulance: Yorkshire
- UK Parliament: Wetherby and Easingwold

Healaugh /hiːlɔː/ is a village and civil parish in the county of North Yorkshire, England. According to the 2001 census it had a population of 161 in 63 households. The population had increased to 249 at the 2011 census. The village is about three miles north north-east of Tadcaster.

== Etymology ==
The placename Healaugh is likely derived from an Old English word heah meaning a high-level forest clearing.

== History ==
Healaugh Park Priory was established near the village at the site now called Healaugh Manor Farm. It was founded in 1218 by Jordan de Santa Maria and his wife, Alice, who was the granddaughter of Bertram Haget. Haget had previously granted the lands outside the village for a hermitage to Gilbert, a monk of Marmoutier. It was finally dissolved in 1535. After the dissolution, it served as the Manor house, amongst whose owners were Sir Arthur D'Arcy and Thomas Wharton, 1st Baron Wharton.

== Governance ==
The village was historically in the West Riding of Yorkshire until 1974. From 1974 to 2023 it was part of the Selby District, it is now administered by the unitary North Yorkshire Council.

The civil parish is a joint parish with nearby Catterton. The joint Parish council has five members, four of which represent the village.

The village lies within the Wetherby and Easingwold Parliamentary constituency.

== Geography ==
The parish covers an area of 3,378 acres (1,367 ha) of which the village occupies 2,666 acres (1,079 ha). It lies 2.29 miles (3.69 km) west of Askham Richard, 1.62 miles (2.61 km) east of Wighill and 1.19 miles (1.92 km) north of Catterton. A short distance to the east of the village is Dam Dyke which flows via Catterton Beck and The Foss into the River Wharfe near Bolton Percy.

== Religion ==
St John the Baptist Church, Healaugh has a fine late Norman doorway of c. 1200. Saint Heiu, Abbess of Hartlepool, is said to have settled here as an anchoress in the 7th century; a tombstone, possibly hers, discovered at a depth of six feet was described by Daniel Henry Haigh in 1842 but is now lost. A vicar of Healaugh Charles Voysey was deprived of the living in 1871 for his heterodox views.

According to several accounts, in 1842, a broken tombstone was discovered about six foot below the surface in the kirkyard at St John the Baptist Church. It has an inscription on it which seems to show two names MADUG and HEIU (there is one letter missing from Hie (u)). The tombstone has since been lost. Similar tombstones were found in Hartlepool in 1833 in a cemetery again well underground at about 4 feet below the surface. The similarities seem to confirm that Healaugh was the latest settlement of Saint Hieu, a 7th-century Irish abbess who worked in Northumbria. The Venerable Bede quotes that a nun, Hieu, founded a convent near Hartlepool, then somewhere near Calcaria (the old name for Tadcaster). "She established a residence for herself about 650 AD". The West window in the Tower has a small pane of glass inscribed with the name Hieu. It is thought that she opened a monastery or hermitage on the site of The Old Priory down the coach road about a mile or so from the village.

At the Norman Conquest, the surrounding land to the church was chiefly held by a Scandinavian named Tochis, from whom it passed to the Percys and then Healaugh later came to the Haget family who, as patrons for the building of a stone church here possibly in 1150, are believed to be the couple shown centrally carved above the stone arch of the south door.

== Notable people ==
- Hieu (abbess), 7th century Irish Abbess, after whom Healaugh may be named.
- Thomas Wharton, 1st Baron Wharton (1495 – 23 August 1568) – resident, buried in the village
- John Parker (Whig politician) (21 October 1799 – 5 September 1881) – buried in the village
- Mark Westaby (born 17 April 1965), British strongman competitor – born in the village

== See also ==
- Listed buildings in Healaugh, Selby

== Gallery ==
Views of Healaugh, Tadcaster
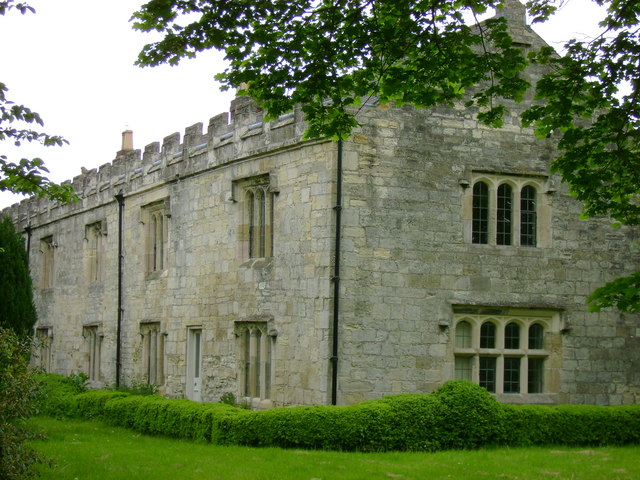
Healaugh Priory

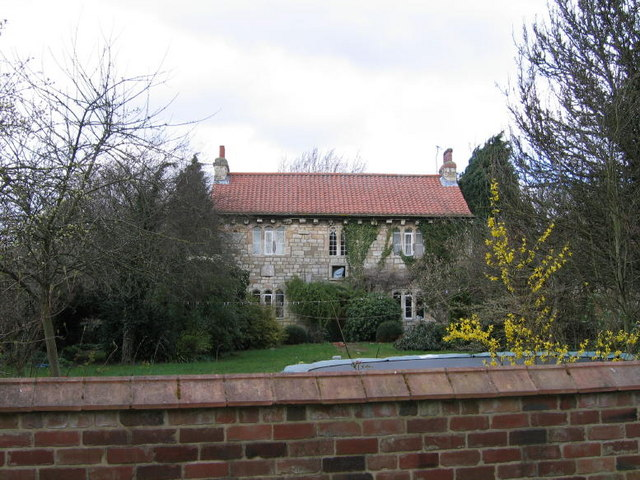
Healaugh Manor Farm

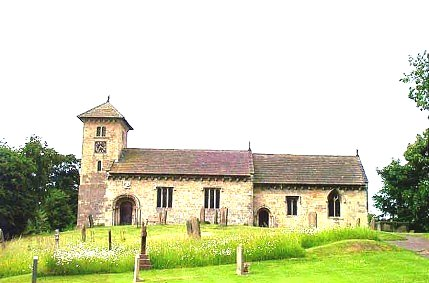
Healaugh, St John The Evangelist Church
