= Hieu (abbess) =

Irish abbess

Abbess
- Born: c. 7th century
- Died: 12 March, c. 7th century Healaugh, Yorkshire, England
- Venerated in: Eastern Orthodox Church; Roman Catholic Church
- Feast: 2 September

Hieu was a 7th-century Irish abbess who worked in Northumbria. She was foundress of abbeys at Hartlepool and Healaugh in Yorkshire England. Hieu was also the first of the saintly recluses of Northumbria, and the first known woman to rule a double monastery.

== Life ==
Nothing is known of her early life, until she met Aidan of Lindisfarne who appointed her abbess of Hartlepool Abbey and subsequently a monastery at Healaugh near Tadcaster.

She died at Healaugh on 12 March of an unknown year in the 7th century. It is possible that the towns of Hartlepool (Hereteu) and Healaugh are named after her.

Hieu's memorial is kept on 2 September.
