= Insular monasticism =

Form of medieval Christian monastic life

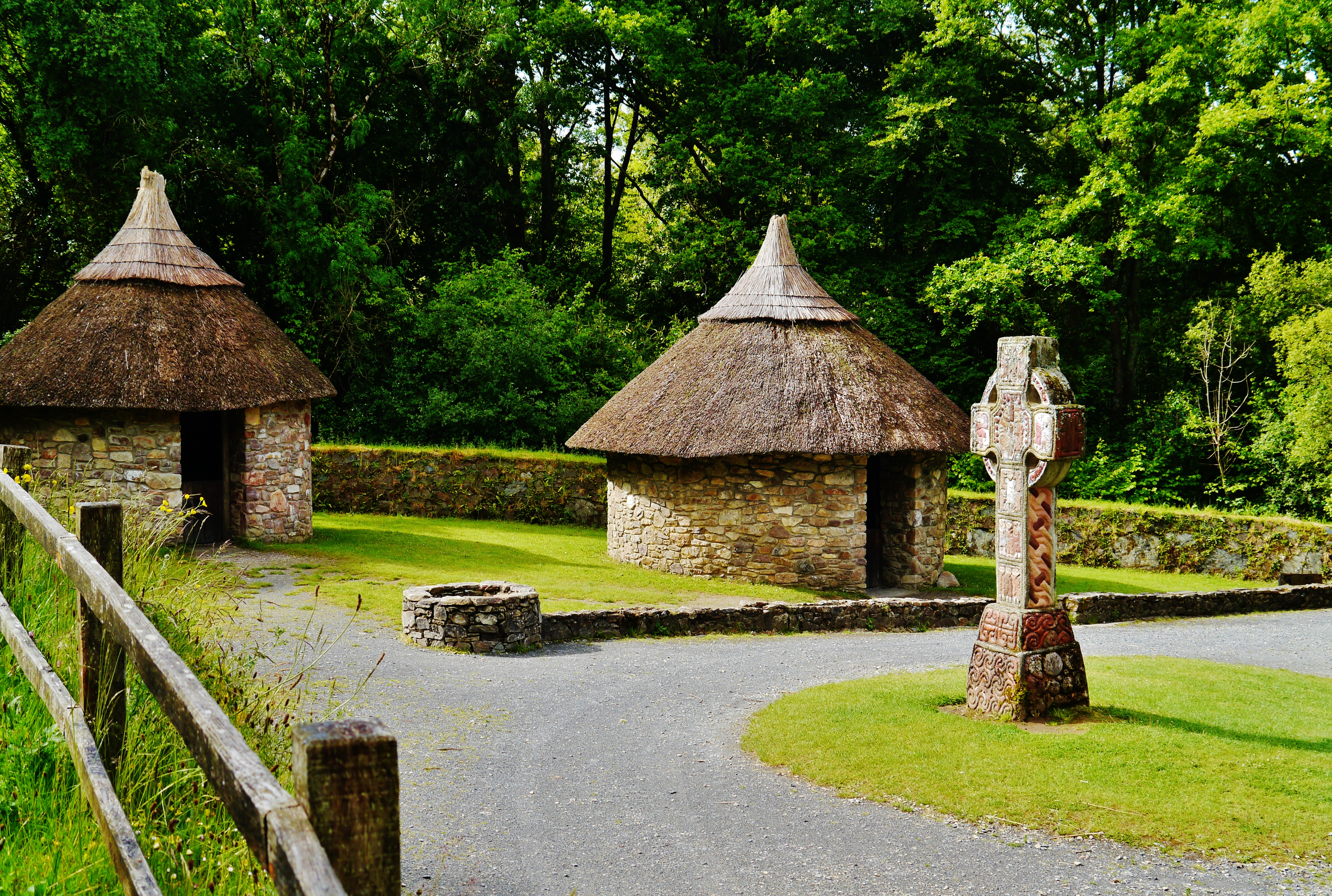
Modern reconstruction of an early Irish monastery; Irish National Heritage Park, County Wexford, Ireland.

Insular monasticism refers to a distinct form of Christian monastic life that developed in the British Isles during the early medieval period—roughly between the 5th and 9th centuries. It is associated especially with Celtic Christianity and the monastic traditions of Ireland, Wales, Scotland, and northern England.

There is archaeological evidence of insular monasticism as early as the mid 5th century, influenced by establishments in Gaul such as the monastery of Martin of Tours at Marmoutier, the abbey established by Honoratus at Lérins; the abbey of Mont-Saint-Michel; and that of Germanus at Auxerre. Many Irish monks studied at Candida Casa near Whithorn in what is now Galloway in Scotland.

== Background ==
By the fifth century, Martin of Tours had established monasteries at Ligugé and Marmoutier; Cassian, the Abbey of St Victor and the women's Abbey of Saint-Sauveur at Marseille; Honoratus at Lérins; and Germanus at Auxerre. The monastic tradition spread from Gaul to the British Isles shortly thereafter. Lérins was famous for training priests, and a number of its monks became bishops. Benedict Biscop spent two years there and later founded St Peter's monastery at Monkwearmouth in Northumbria under the Rule of St Benedict.

As Christianity spread into Ireland and parts of Great Britain during the late 4th and 5th centuries, monastic communities emerged in places such as Iona, Lindisfarne and Kildare. Several early Irish monks were noted for being missionaries, traveling into Great Britain and continental Europe.

== History ==
The Roman, and therefore Saxon conception of ecclesiastical government was territorial and diocesan. The Celtic conception was tribal and monastic. In the British Isles in the 5th century, the earliest monastic communities in Ireland, Wales and Strathclyde followed a different, distinctly Celtic model. It seems clear that the first Celtic monasteries were merely settlements where the Christians lived together – priests and laity, men, women, and children alike – as a kind of religious clan. At a later period actual monasteries both of monks and nuns were formed, and later still the eremitical life came into vogue.

The early Celtic monasteries were like small villages, where the people were taught everything from farming to religion, with the idea in mind that eventually a group would split off, move a few miles away and establish another monastery. In this way, the Celtic way of life, and the Celtic Church propagated its way across Ireland and eventually to Western Britain and Scotland. Irish monks spread Christianity into Cornwall, Wales, and Scotland. St. Ninian established a monastery at Whithorn in Scotland about 400 AD, and he was followed by St. Columba (Iona), and St. Aidan, who founded a monastery at Lindisfarne in Northumbria. Columban wandering monks became missionaries. Founding saints were almost invariably lesser members of local dynasties, and their successors were often chosen from among their kin. Ultan, abbot-bishop of Arbraccan, was a disciple and kinsman of Declán of Ardmore, who made him bishop of Ardbraccan.

The Insular observance, at first so distinctive, gradually lost its special character and fell into line with that of other countries; but, by that time, Celtic monasticism had passed its zenith and its influence had declined.

== Scotland ==
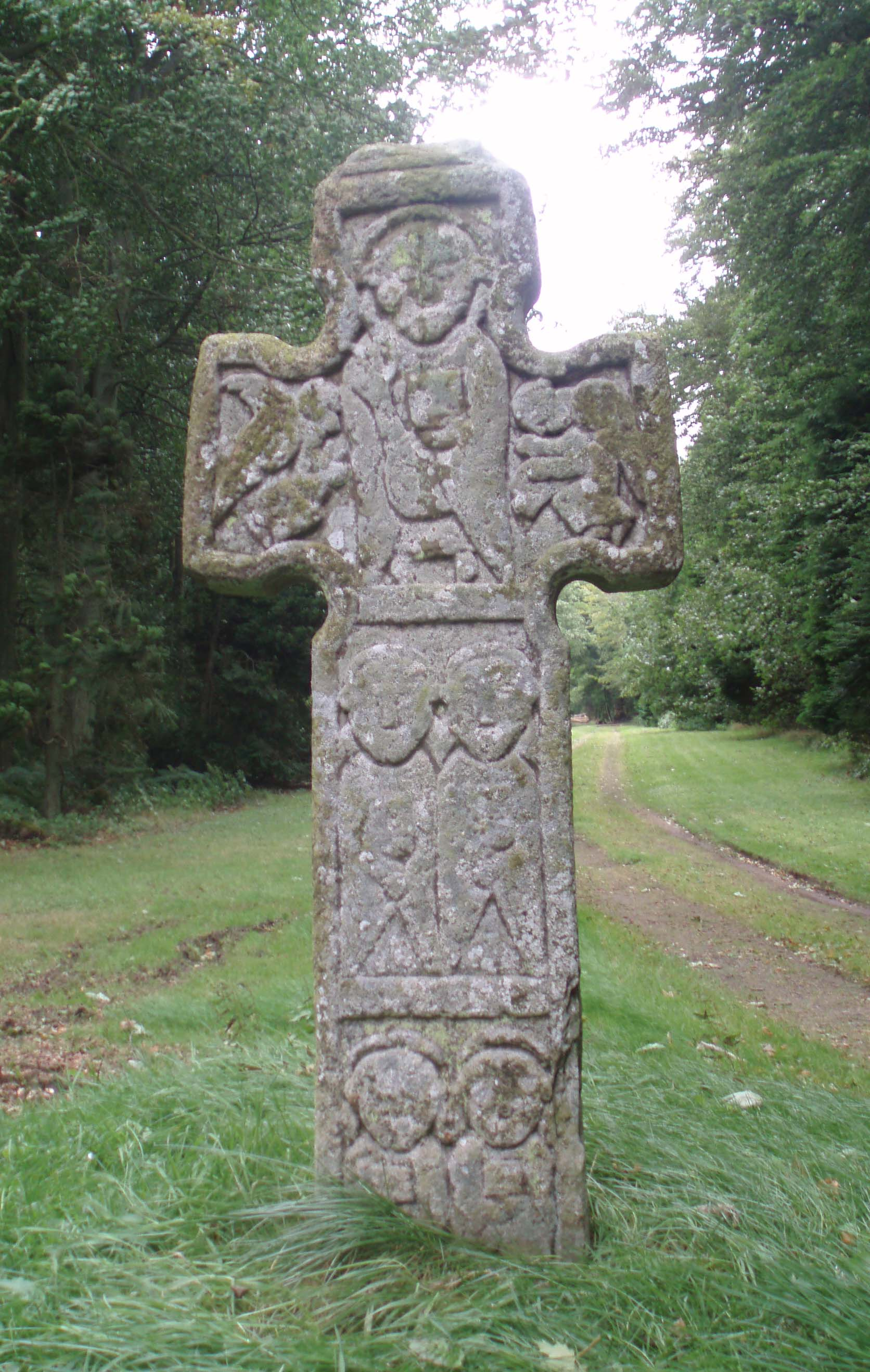
The Camus Cross, a cruciform Pictish stone associated with the Hiberno-Scottish mission (see below).

"The impact of monasticism on Scotland was profound and long lasting." Whithorn, an early trading center, precedes the island of Iona by 150 years as a birthplace of Scottish Christianity. The oldest Christian monument in Scotland is "The Latinus Stone", a cemetery stone dated to the mid 5th century. Bede recounts a traditional belief that in 397, Ninian established the first Christian mission north of Hadrian's Wall here.

=== Ninian ===
According to the traditional account as expanded in the Vita Sancti Niniani, attributed to Aelred of Rievaulx, Ninian was a Briton who had studied in Rome. On his return, he stopped to visit Martin of Tours, who sent masons with him on his homeward journey. These masons built a church of stone, on the shore. Shortly thereafter (397), upon learning of Saint Martin's death, Ninian dedicated the church to him. Ninian went on to convert the southern Picts to Christianity. There is strong modern scholarly consensus that Ninian and Finnian of Movilla are the same person, whose actual name was "Uinniau".

The small stone church, known as the "Candida Casa" ("shining white house"), was Scotland's first Christian building. Archaeological excavations have suggested that Whithorn was primarily a commercial settlement, whose residents were Christian, and that a more likely location for Ninian's church might have been Kirkmadrine, across the bay. It appears that Rosnat was a double monastery with a separate house for women.

At Whithorn, many monks were trained who later went into the missionary field to become famous apostles of Ireland and Alba, even as far north as the misty Orkney and Shetland Islands. Saint Éogan, founder of the monastery of Ardstraw, was an Irishman who lived in the sixth century AD and was said to have been taken by pirates to Britain. On obtaining his freedom, he went to study at Candida Casa. Enda of Aran first studied with Ailbe of Emly, and then went to the Candida Casa. Enda founded the first monastery in the Aran Islands.

=== Other monastic foundations ===
About 528, Cadoc is said to have built a stone monastery probably at Kilmadock, which was named for him, north-west of Stirling. In 565 Saint Kenneth joined Columba in Scotland and then went on to found a monastery in Fife. Kingarth monastery on the Isle of Bute is associated with saints Cathan and his nephew Bláán, who studied under Kenneth.

A contemporary of Columba, Moluag, is described in The Matryrology of Óengus, as "The Clear and Brilliant, The Sun of Lismore in Alba". He was ordained by Comgall of Bangor, who may have been a kinsman. Around 562, he and twelve companions embarked on a "white martyrdom", forsaking their homeland to establish a monastery on the island of Lismore in Scotland. Lismore became an important center of Celtic Christianity. Máel Ruba, grand-nephew of Comgall of Bangor, (whose father was Pictish), founded Applecross Abbey in 672 in what was then Pictish territory. A six-mile radius of his grave was designated "A' Chomraich" ("The Sanctuary"), and accorded all the rights and privileges of sanctuary. According to Adomnán, Donnán of Eigg was martyred with a number of monks at his monastery at Kildonnan.

Shortly before his death in 651, Aidan of Lindisfarne founded Melrose Abbey on the River Tweed, as a daughter house of his own establishment. Cuthbert entered Melrose under Abbot Eata. He studied under Prior Boisil. The sick would come from far distances to Boisil, who was skilled in the healing properties of various herbs and the nearby mineral springs. Around 658 Eata left Melrose and founded a new monastery at Ripon in Yorkshire, taking with him the young Cuthbert as his guest-master. Boisil succeeded Eata as abbot at Melrose.

Between 1994 and 2007, archaeological investigations directed by Martin Carver confirmed the existence of a Pictish monastery at Portmahomack on Tarbat Ness in Easter Ross. The monastery began around 550 AD and was destroyed by fire in about 800 AD. It had a burial ground with cist and head-support burials, a stone church, at least four monumental stone crosses and workshops making church plate, vellum and early Christian books.

In the Eighth Century a monastic community was founded at Cennrigmonaid, which later became St. Andrews, perhaps by the Pictish king Óengus son of Fergus. The clergy at the time were the Céli Dé (Culdees). The Irish annals record the death of one of their abbots, Túathalán, in 747. One version of the foundation legend states that the monastery was defined by free-standing crosses.

Physically Scottish monasteries differed significantly from those on the continent, and were often an isolated collection of wooden huts surrounded by a wall. St. Donnan's monastery at Kildonnan was located within an oval enclosure, surrounded by a ditch, housing a rectangular chapel in the center, and a handful of smaller buildings either side.

== England ==
On his second visit to Britain, around 446, Germanus of Auxerre accompanied by Severus of Trier, established schools at Ross-on-Wye and Hentland. "By means of these schools", says Bede, "the Church continued ever afterwards pure in the faith and free from heresy". In the 6th century, Dubricius/Dyfrig, who was born in Herefordshire, of a Welsh mother, founded a monastery at Hentland and then one at Moccas.

The earliest monastic site in the United Kingdom appears to have been at Beckery, near Glastonbury. Excavations conducted in 2016, revealed what archaeologists say is a monastic cemetery dating to the 5th century. The monastery, consisting of a few wattle and daub buildings, was situated on an island surrounded by wetlands.

=== Augustinian mission ===
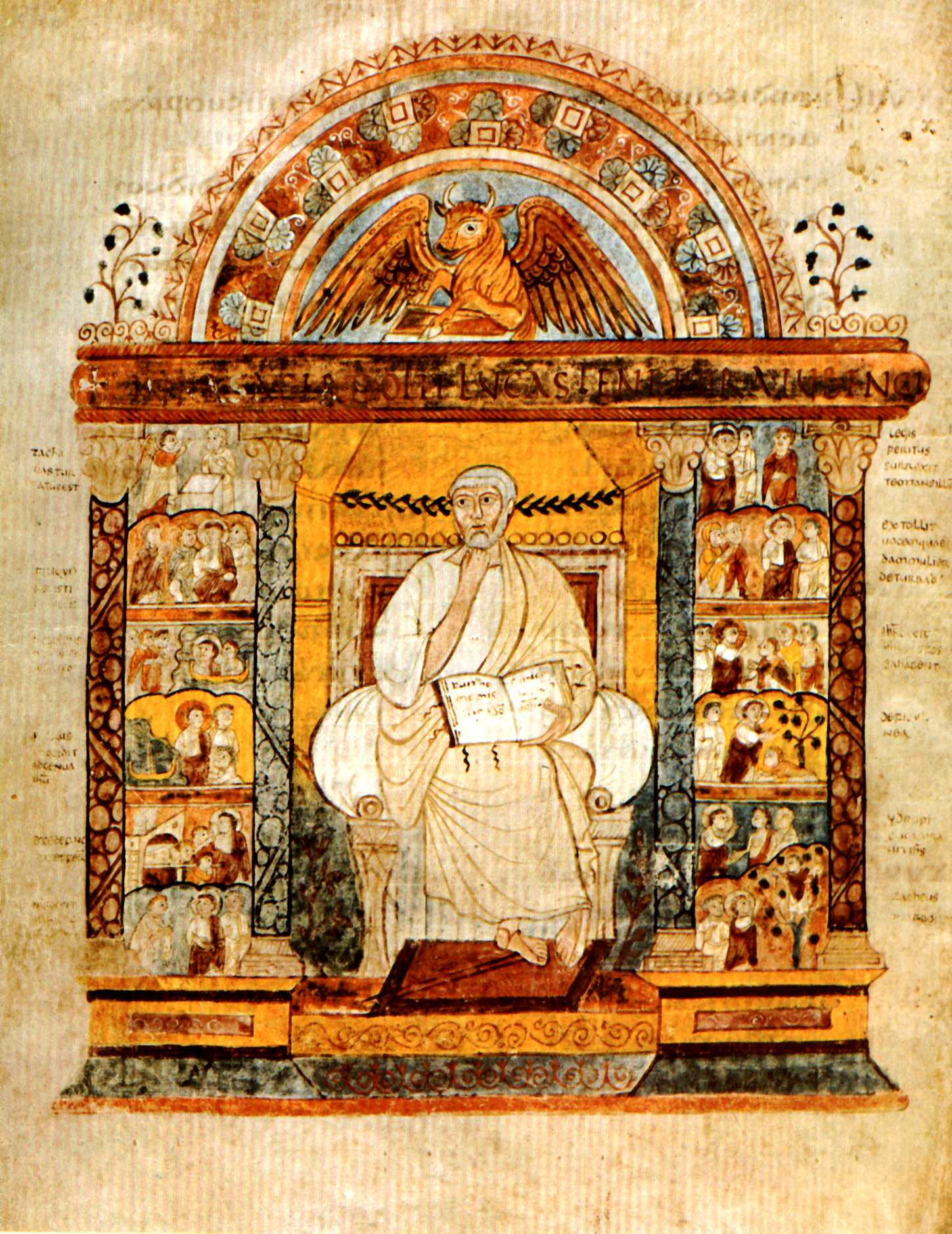
The evangelist portrait of Luke from the St Augustine Gospels, traditionally, and plausibly, held to be one of the books sent by Pope Gregory I to Augustine of Canterbury in 601

By the time the Roman Empire recalled its legions from the province of Britannia in 410, parts of the island had already been settled by pagan Germanic tribes who, appear to have taken control of Kent and other coastal regions no longer defended by the Roman Empire. In the late 6th century Pope Gregory I sent a group of missionaries to Kent to convert Æthelberht, King of Kent, whose wife, Bertha of Kent, was a Frankish princess and Christian. Soon after his arrival, Augustine founded the monastery of Saints Peter and Paul on land donated by the king. Later, it was renamed St Augustine's Abbey.

Probably the earliest monastery established in England for women was Saint Peter's Abbey in Folkestone, having been traditionally founded in 630 by Eanswith, the daughter of King Eadbald of Kent, the son of Æthelberht of Kent.

The spread of Christianity in the north of Britain gained ground when Edwin of Northumbria married Æthelburg, a daughter of Æthelbert, and agreed to allow her to continue to worship as a Christian. The missionary Paulinus of York accompanied Æthelburg north. After Edwin's death in the Battle of Hatfield Chase, his immediate successors reverted to paganism, His widowed queen Æthelburg fled, with members of her family, to her brother, King Eadbald of Kent. Æthelburh founded Lyminge Abbey about four miles northwest of Folkestone on the south coast of Kent.

After Paulinus left Northumbria with Queen Æthelburg, his assistant James the Deacon remained and continued his missionary efforts, primarily in the Kingdom of Lindsey. James, was a trained singing master in the Roman and Kentish style, and taught many people plainsong or Gregorian chant in the Roman manner.

Among those who went to Kent was Edwin's niece, Hild, who had been baptized by Paulinus. Some time later, her sister, Hereswith became a nun at Chelles Abbey in Gaul, but Hild returned north with some companions, and was trained in Celtic monasticism by Aidan of Lindisfarne, part of the Hiberno-Scottish mission to northern Britain. The double monastery of Hartlepool Abbey, a walled enclosure of simple wooden huts surrounding a church had been founded in 640 by Hieu, an Irish recluse in Northumbria. In 649, Aidan sent Hieu to establish a monastery at Healaugh near Tadcaster, and named Hild abbess at Hartlepool. Around 657, Aidan asked her to found a monastery at Streoneshalh. Hild served as abbess of both monasteries, but resided at Streaneshalch.

In 670, Eadbald's granddaughter, Domne Eafe, founded the double monastery of St. Mildred's Abbey at Minster-in-Thanet. The East Anglian princess Æthelthryth founded a double monastery at Ely in 673.

With the Gregorian missionaries, a third strand of Christian practice was added to the British Isles, to combine with the Gaulish and the Hiberno-British strands already present. The Gregorian missionaries had little lasting influence in Northumbria, where after Edwin's death the conversion of the Northumbrians was achieved by missionaries from Iona, not Canterbury.

=== Other monastic foundations ===
Felix of Burgundy may have studied at one of the monasteries founded by Columbanus. He travelled to Britain and arriving in Canterbury around 630, Archbishop Honorius appointed him bishop for the Kingdom of East Anglia. He founded Soham Abbey, whose monastic buildings were surrounded by a wall and moat. Fursey was a monk from Connacht and supposedly the grand-nephew of Brendan of Clonfert. Fursey founded a monastery at Killursa in County Galway. He then travelled to East Anglia with his brothers, Foillan and Ultan, during the early 630s shortly before St Aidan founded his monastery on Holy Island. Around 633, King Sigeberht received them and endowed a monastery, which they established at Cnobheresburg on the site of an old, stone-built, Roman shore-fort near the sea.

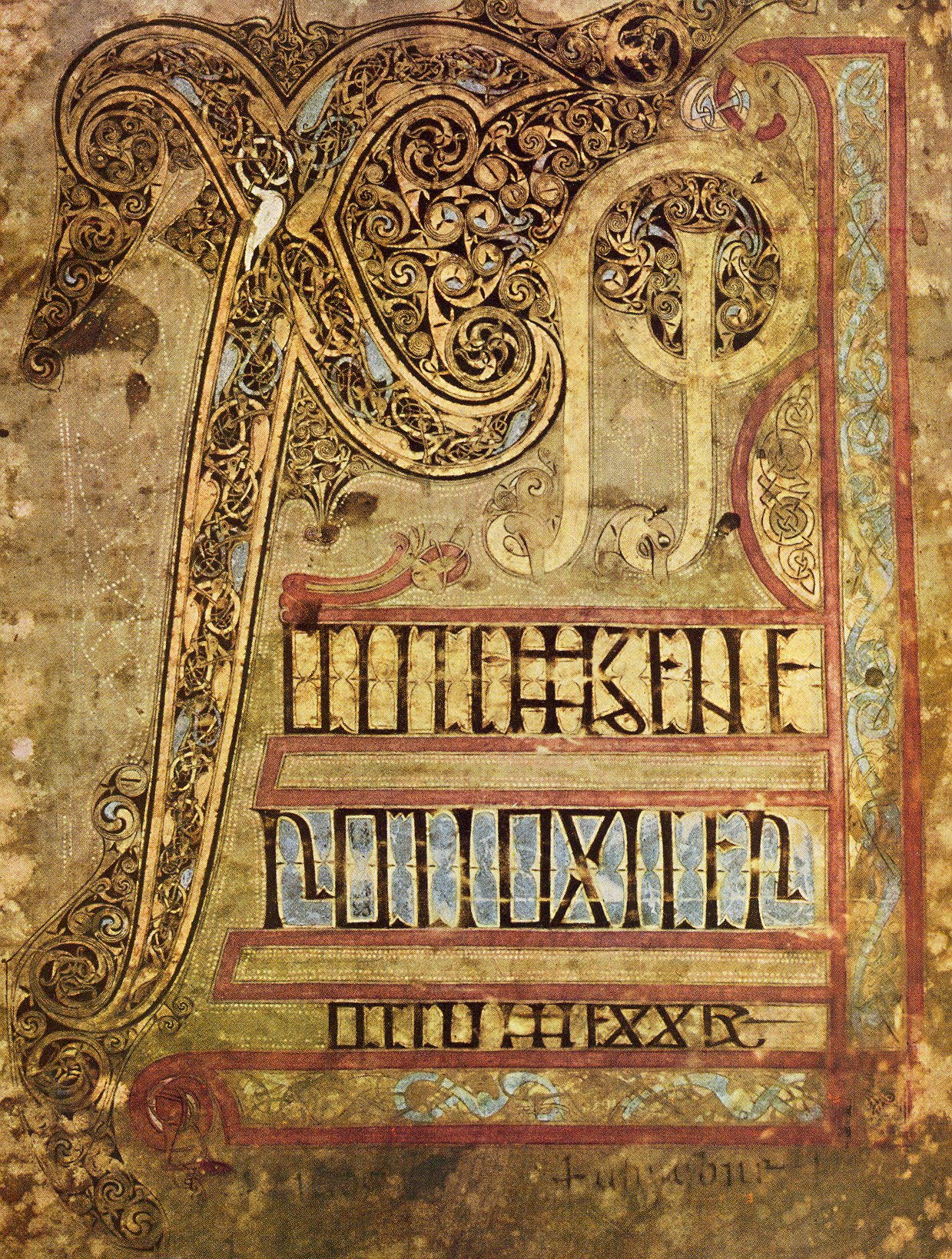
Chi-rho page from the Lichfield Gospels, a masterpiece of Insular art. This English Gospel book contains marginalia in Old Welsh.

Cælin was chaplain to Œthelwald of Deira. It was through his influence that the king founded a monastery at Lastingham. Cælin's older brother Cedd was made abbot. Cedd was from Northumbria and had been brought up on the island of Lindisfarne by Aidan. He practiced the Celtic Rite, which had a strong emphasis on personal asceticism. He was appointed bishop to the Kingdom of Essex and founded monasteries at Tilaburg and in 653 at Ithancester. Cedd and his brothers regarded Lastingham as their monastic base, providing intellectual and spiritual support, and a place of retreat. While on his missionary journeys Cedd delegated the daily oversight of Lastingham to others. Cedd died at Lastingham on 26 October 664, and was succeeded as abbot by his brother Chad. According to Bede, immediately after Cedd's death a party of thirty monks travelled up from Essex to Lastingham to do homage. All but one small boy died there, also of the plague.

Sometime between 653 and 656, Seaxwulf founded a monastery at Medeshamstede. By 681, the Celtic monk, Dicul, and five disciples had established a small monastery at Bosham in West Sussex.

=== Anglo-Saxon mission ===
Anglo-Saxon missionaries were instrumental in the spread of Christianity in the Frankish Empire during the 8th century, continuing the work of Hiberno-Scottish missionaries which had been spreading Celtic Christianity across the Frankish Empire as well as in Scotland and Anglo-Saxon England itself during the 6th century.

In 668, four years after the Synod of Whitby, Colmán resigned as Abbot of Lindisfarne and returned to Iona along with many of the Irish monks and about thirty of the Anglo-Saxon. From Iona he went to Ireland and founded a monastery called "Mayo of the Saxons". The Northumbrian Gerald of Mayo was appointed its first abbot in 670. It was one of several established specifically for Anglo Saxons.

Ecgberht of Ripon, who organized the first missionary efforts, studied at Rath Melsigi in County Carlow; as did Wihtberht,Willibrord, and Swithbert, Adalbert of Egmond, and Chad of Mercia. Ecgbert of York founded a school, among whose students were the scholar Alcuin, and the Frisian Ludger, who founded in 799. Werden Abbey on the Ruhr.

== Wales ==
The Celtic idea of sanctity inclined for the most part to a great love of the eremitical life. Each locality seems to have its hermit who in his lonely chapel prayed and practiced austerities. Tathan was an Irish monk, who, leaving Ireland, sailed up the River Severn and established a monastery at Venta Silurum. As a boy Cadoc was sent to study under Tathan. Llancarvan monastery in Glamorganshire, was founded in the latter part of the fifth century by Cadoc. The site included a monastery, a college, and a hospital. "Gildas the Wise" was invited by Cadoc to deliver lectures in the monastery and spent a year there, during which he made a copy of a book of the Gospels, long treasured in the church of St. Cadoc. The Welsh felt such reverence for this book that they used it in their most solemn oaths and covenants. Cainnech of Aghaboe, Caradoc of Llancarfan and many others studied there.

=== Saint David ===
Saint David (or Dewi) is the patron saint of Wales. Tradition holds that he was born in Ceredigion. He began his studies first with Illtud at Llanilltud Fawr in Glamorganshire, and continued with Pawl Hen at "Ty Gwyn", the "white house" overlooking Whitesands Bay in Pembrokeshire. He became renowned as a teacher and preacher, founding or restoring twelve monastic settlements in Wales, Dumnonia, and Brittany. St David's Cathedral stands on the site of "Tyddewi" ("David's house"), the monastery he founded in the Glyn Rhosyn valley of Pembrokeshire.

The monks fed and clothed the poor and needy; they cultivated the land and carried out many crafts, including beekeeping, in order to feed themselves and the many pilgrims and travellers who needed lodgings. Known for his asceticism, his monastic Rule prescribed that monks had to pull the plough themselves without draught animals, and must drink only water and eat only bread with salt and herbs. Having been warned by St. Scuthyn, that his monks tried to poison him, David blessed the poisoned bread and ate it without harm. (A similar story is later told of Anthony of Padua.)

David became Bishop of Caerleon, and moved the see to Menevia, the Roman port Menapia in Pembrokeshire, then the chief point of departure for Ireland.

=== Other monastic foundations ===
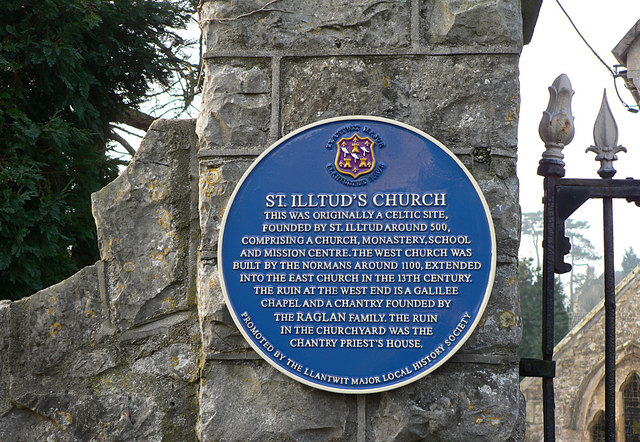
Blue Plaque at gateway of St Illtyd's Church, Llantwit Major

Illtud received the tonsure from Dyfrig, Archbishop of Llandaff, and then went to study under Cadoc at Llancarvan. He was subsequently ordained priest by Germanus of Auxerre. Around 500, Illtud, founded a monastery called Cor Tewdws at Llanilltud Fawr. Its school was a primary learning center of Sub-Roman Britain, but was situated on the Glamorgan Plain exposed to hostile incursions from Irish pirates, and to Viking raids. The course of studies at Llaniltyd (and this also applies to the other monasteries) included Latin, Greek, rhetoric, philosophy, theology, and mathematics. Saint Patrick, Paul Aurelian, the bard Taliesin, and Magloire, are believed to have spent some time there. Samson of Dol was known to have been summoned by Dyfrig to join the monastery in 521 and he was briefly elected abbot before leaving for Cornwall.

Also in the 6th century, Saint Cadfan built the first "Clas" in Wales before establishing a monastery on Bardsey Island. Around 539 Deiniol built a monastery at Bangor in Gwynedd. Bangor is an old Welsh word for a wattled enclosure,

A monastery was established at Bangor-on-Dee in about AD 560 by Saint Dunod (or Dunawd) and was an important religious center in the 5th and 6th centuries. The monastery was destroyed in about 613 by the Anglo-Saxon king Æthelfrith of Northumbria after he defeated the Welsh armies at the Battle of Chester; a number of the monks then transferred to Bardsey Island. Before the battle, monks from the monastery had fasted for three days and then climbed a hill to witness the fight and pray for the success of the Welsh; they were massacred on the orders of Æthelfrith. The massacre was recounted in a poem entitled "The Monks of Bangor's March" by Walter Scott. No trace of the monastery remains aa it is likely that all the buildings, were built of wattle and daub.

The monastery of Liancwlwy in the vale of Clwyd was founded by Kentigern, Bishop of Glasgow. Anti-Christian sentiment forced Kentigern to quit his see, and he took refuge in Wales, where, after visiting St. David at Menevia, he received from a Welsh prince a grant of land for the erection of a monastery. These he divided the community into three companies; one, who were unlearned, worked the farm; the second, around the monastery; the third, which was made up of the learned, devoted their time to study and apostolic labours, and numbered upwards of 365. These last were divided into two choirs, one of which always entered the church as the others left, so that prayer was continual. Rhydderch Hael later invited him to return to his see and he left the government of his monastery and school to St. Asaph, his favorite scholar, whose name was afterwards conferred upon the church and diocese.

The Cambro-British monks led a hard and austere life. According to historian John Capgrave, When they had done their field work, returning to the cloisters of their monastery, they spent the rest of the day till evening in reading and writing. And in the evening at the sound of the bell, they went to the church and remained there till the stars appeared, and then all went together to eat, but not to fullness. Their food was bread with roots or herbs, seasoned with salt, and they quenched their thirst with milk mingled with water. Supper being ended they persevered about three hours in prayer. After this they went to rest and at cock crowing rose again, and abode in prayer till the dawn of day.

Llanbadern near Aberystwith that of Padern; Beddgelert is associated with St. Celert. A Celtic monastery was established on Caldey Island in the sixth century.

== Ireland ==
=== Patrick ===
Both Ultan of Ardbraccan (died c. 657) and Tírechán (fl. 7th century) believed that Saint Patrick spent time at the monastery of Lérins (near present-day Cannes). Association with the monastery of Lérins, and the influence of St John Cassian in that area, would have exposed Patrick to the monastic practice and spirituality of the Desert Fathers - the Coptic Church of Egypt greatly influenced early Irish Christian practice. Patrick introduced the monastic system into Ireland, though legend tells of an earlier "monastery" of Saint Ibar (traditionally d. 500) at Beggerin. According to Tírechán, many early Patrician churches were combined with nunneries founded by Patrick's noble female converts.

=== Other monastic foundations ===
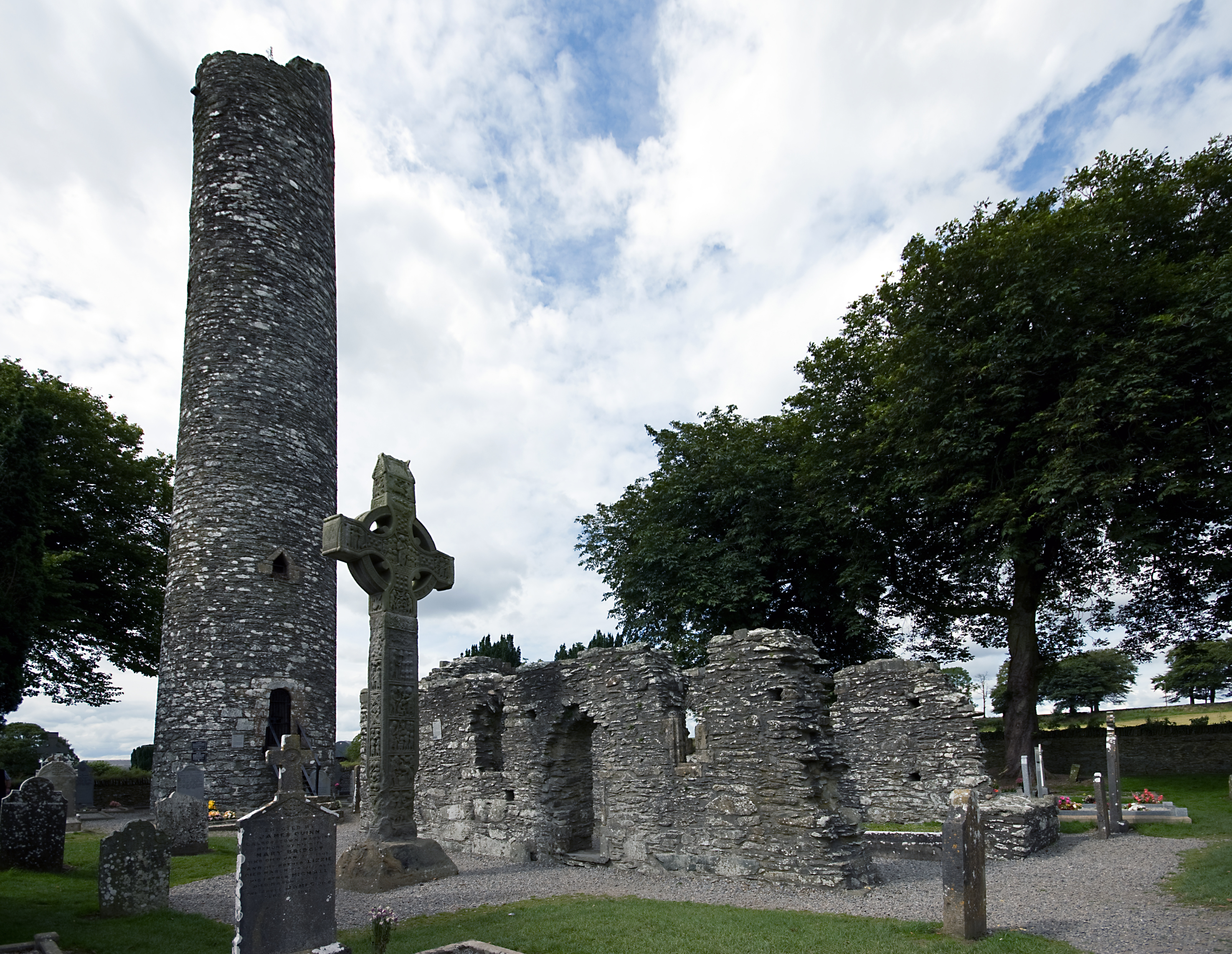
Ruinous Monasterboice today. Pictured is a round tower, church ruins and one of the site's three high crosses. Monasterboice was one of many monastic settlements founded in early medieval Ireland, in this case by Buíte.

Saint Declan (fl. 350–450 AD) founded a monastery at Ardmore, possibly the oldest Christian settlement in Ireland. A contemporary was Ailbe, whose Vita, written c. 750, says that he preached Christianity in Munster before the arrival of St. Patrick, and founded a monastery at Emly. Enda of Aran studied with Aible before founding a monastery on Inishmore. According to John Healy, "The fame of his austere sanctity soon spread throughout Erin, and attracted religious men from all parts of the country. Amongst the first who came to visit Enda's island sanctuary was Brendan of Clonfert, as did Jarlath of Tuam around 495.

According to tradition, around 480 Brigid founded a double monastery at Kildare (Cill Dara: "church of the oak"), on the site of a pagan shrine to the Celtic goddess Brigid. Íte, who was said to embody the six virtues of Irish womanhood: wisdom, purity, beauty, musical ability, gentle speech and needle skills, founded a community of nuns at Killeedy. Moninne, who is said to have been brought up by Brigid of Kildare, studied with Ibar of Beggerin before founding her monastery of nuns in Killeavy. According to the Vita of Ibar's nephew, Abbán moccu Corbmaic, Abbán built an abbey at Ballyvourney, and gave it Gobnait, who according to tradition, was his sister. A separate account says that the abbey was founded by a disciple of Finbarr of Cork.

According to some sources, Finnian of Clonard studied for a time at the monastic center of Marmoutier Abbey, founded by Martin of Tours in Gaul. Later he continued his studies at the monastery of Cadoc the Wise, at Llancarfan in Glamorgan. He returned to Ireland, and around 520 founded Clonard Abbey, modelled on the practices of Welsh monasteries, and based on the traditions of the Desert Fathers and the study of Scripture. The rule of Clonard was known for its strictness and asceticism. Pupils of Finnian who became the founding fathers of monasteries are described as leaving Clonard bearing a book or crozier or some other object, suggesting that a working scriptorium and craft workshops were established at Clonard at an early date.

Around 600, a different St. Abbán built a monastery called Magheranoidhe, in County Wexford, at what is now Adamstown. Colman mac Duagh studied under Enda of Aran and became a hermit on Inishmore, before founding Kilmacduagh monastery in Galway on land given him by his cousin King Guaire Aidne mac Colmáin of Connacht. Colman was an abbot/bishop. As with many relics, Colman's abbatial crozier has been used through the centuries for the swearing of oaths. It is now in the National Museum in Dublin.

=== Hiberno-Scottish mission ===
The Hiberno-Scottish mission was a series of missionary expeditions by Gaelic monks from Ireland and the western coast of Scotland, which contributed to the spread of Christianity and established monasteries in Britain and continental Europe during the Middle Ages.

In 563, Columba left Ireland and settled with the Gaels of Dál Riata, founding an abbey on Iona, which became one of the oldest Christian religious centers in Western Europe. His reputation as a holy man led to his role as a diplomat among the tribes. He is said by Bede and Adamnán to have ministered to the Gaels of Dál Riata and converted the northern Pictish kingdoms. In addition to founding several churches in the Hebrides, he worked to turn his monastery at Iona into a school for missionaries. The Abbey became a dominant religious, educational, and political institution in the region for centuries.

Around 634, Aidan, a monk of Iona was sent to Northumbria and founded a priory on Lindisfarne. In the years prior to Aidan's mission, Christianity, which had been propagated throughout Britain but not Ireland by the Roman Empire, had been largely displaced by Anglo-Saxon paganism. The monastery he founded grew and helped found churches and other religious institutions throughout the area.

Columbanus studied under Comgall of Bangor. The rule at Bangor was very strict. The monks were employed in tillage or other manual labour. At Bangor only one meal was allowed, and that not until evening. Food was scant and plain. Herbs, water, and bread was customary. Severe acts of penance were frequent. Silence was observed at meals and at other times also, conversation being restricted to the minimum. Fasting was frequent and prolonged. Around 585 set sail for the continent with twelve companions and established Luxeuil Abbey on the site of a former Gallo-Roman settlement. The rule that observed at Luxeuil derived from Celtic monastic traditions. His severity and the inflexible rule he had established may have contributed to friction with the Burgundian court. He left Gaul, and in 611 established Mehrerau Abbey with a second monastery for nuns nearby. In 614, he established Bobbio Abbey on land donated by the Lombard king Agilulf. When Columbanus crossed the Alps into Italy, Gallus remained behind and became a hermit in the forests southwest of Lake Constance, near the source of the river Steinach, and died around 646. About 100 years later, the Abbey of Saint Gall was erected on the site of his hermitage.

==== Rule of Columbanus ====
The Rule of Saint Columbanus embodied the customs of Bangor Abbey and other Irish monasteries. In the first chapter, Columbanus introduces the great principle of his Rule: obedience, absolute and unreserved. One manifestation of this obedience was hard labour designed to subdue the flesh, exercise the will in daily self-denial, and set an example of industry in cultivation of the soil. Columbanus presents mortification as an essential element in the lives of monks, who are instructed to defeat pride by obeying without murmuring and hesitation." Columbanus' Rule regarding diet was very strict. Monks were to eat a limited diet of beans, vegetables, flour mixed with water and small bread of a loaf, taken in the evenings. Any deviation from the Rule entailed a penance of corporal punishment, or a severe form of fasting.

In chapter seven, he instituted a service of perpetual prayer, known as laus perennis, by which choir succeeded choir, both day and night. This practice had been taken up from the East around 522 at St. Maurice's Abbey in Agaunum. The "custom of Agaunum", as it came to be called, spread over Gaul, to other abbeys, including Luxeuil.

== Cornwall ==
It had been thought that Cornwall derived a great part of its Christianity from post-Patrician Irish missions. St. Ia and her companions, and St. Piran, St. Sennen, St. Petrock, were identified as having come from Ireland. However, Nicholas Orme says that evidence for Irish saints in Cornwall is "largely late and unreliable".

=== Petroc and Piran ===
Petroc, along with Piran, and St. Michael, is one of the patron saints of Cornwall. A younger son of an unnamed Welsh warlord, Petroc studied in Ireland. Upon returning from a pilgrimage to Rome, the wind and tide brought him to Trebetherick. He founded a monastery with a school and infirmary at Lanwethinoc (the church of Wethinoc, an earlier holy man), at the mouth of the river Camel on the North Cornish Coast. It came to be called Petrocs-Stow (Petroc's Place), now Padstow. This became the base for missionary journeys throughout Cornwall), Devon, Somerset, Dorset, and Brittany. After about thirty years, he founded a second monastery on the site of the hermitage of St Guron at Bodmin.

Piran is said to have come from Ireland and landed upon the sandy beach of Perranzabuloe, where he established the wattle and daub Abbey of Lanpiran. "The Celtic monastery …consisted of a congeries of detached cells, each suitable for the habitation of one or more monks". Piran is the patron saint of tin miners. Saint Piran's Flag is the flag of Cornwall, as St. Petroc's Flag is of Devon.

=== Other monastic foundations ===
St Guron founded a monastery at Bodmin, but left for the coast upon the arrival of Petroc. According to tradition St German's Priory was founded by Germanus of Auxerre himself ca. 430 AD. Padarn, who studied at Illtud's school, Cor Tewdws. founded a monastery at Llanbadarn Fawr, near Aberystwyth, which became the seat of a new diocese, with him as its first bishop.

Docco is said to have come with his sister Kew from Gwent in south Wales to Cornwall and founded at St Kew a religious center known as Lan Docco. Samson of Dol visited Lan Docco when he came to Cornwall in the early 6th century.

== Benedictine monasticism ==
In 516, Benedict of Nursia wrote a Rule for monks living communally under the authority of an abbot. Benedict adapted earlier monastic traditions to his own time. Jerome Thiesen O.S.B., cites as influences: the writings of St. Pachomius, St. Basil the Great, St. Augustine, John Cassian, and most especially the Rule of the Master, an anonymous rule written two or three decades before Benedict's.

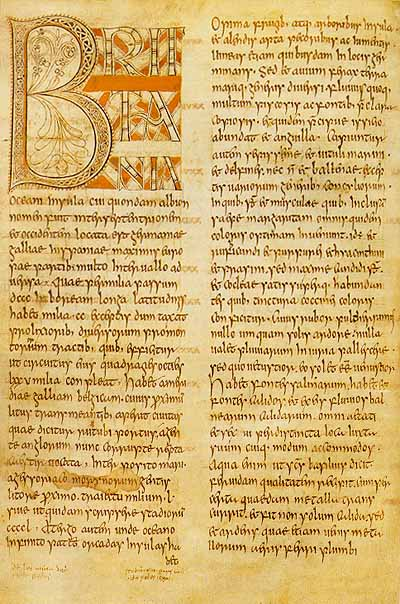
Page from the Saint Petersburg Bede, an 8th-century copy of Bede's Ecclesiastical History of the English People.

Use of the Columban Rule was widespread in congregations in Francia established either by Columbanus himself or his followers. At the same time the Rule of St. Benedict spread northward from southern Italy. By 640 both rules had been in long use at Bobbio. Abbot Waldebert of Luxeuil combined portions of both for the rule he drew up for the nuns of Faremoutiers Abbey. Donatus of Besancon combined elements from the Rule of Benedict, the Rule of Caesarius of Arles and Columbanus' Rule for the monastery his mother founded. The Rule of Saint Columbanus was approved of by the Fourth Council of Mâcon in 627, but it was superseded at the close of the century by the Rule of Saint Benedict. For several centuries in some of the greater monasteries the two rules were observed conjointly. From the 7th century important monasteries following the Benedictine Rule were established in the north of England, at Hexham, at Whitby, and at Wearmouth and Jarrow in County Durham.

=== The Abbey Church of Saint Peter and Saint Paul, Monkwearmouth–Jarrow ===
Benedict Biscop was a young noble at the court of Oswiu of Berenicia. In 653, at the age of twenty-five, he made his first pilgrimage to Rome to pray at the tombs of SS. Peter and Paul. Twelve years later, he returned to Rome, and on his return stopped at Lérins Abbey and became a Benedictine monk, taking the "Benedict". In 669, while again in Rome, he was assigned to accompany the new Archbishop of Canterbury Theodore of Tarsus to England as interpreter. Theodore named Biscop abbot of SS. Peter and Paul's, in Canterbury. In 674, Benedict Biscop founded St Peter's Abbey at Wearmouth on land given by King Ecgfrith of Northumbria. He traveled to Francia to bring back stonemasons and glassworkers to construct a monastery in the Pre-Romanesque style. It was one of the first stone buildings in Northumbria since the Roman period. The king was so pleased that seven years later, he donated additional land for the Abbey of St. Paul of Tarsus seven miles away at Jarrow. Biscop staffed Jarrow with monks from Monkwearmouth, and asked Ceolfrith to serve as abbot. One of those who relocated from Monkwearmouth was Ceolfrith's student Bede. Biscop envisioned the abbeys as a double monastery and Ceolfrith eventually became abbot overseeing both locations. St. Peter's had a stained glassworks near the River Wear. Craft and industrial activity (such as metal- and glass-working) were carried out at St. Paul's near the River Tyne. The Abbey Church of Saint Peter and Saint Paul, Monkwearmouth–Jarrow had an extensive library of books collected by Biscop during his trips to the continent. Ceolfrith added to the collection. The scriptorium developed a faster script in order to keep up with demand from across Europe for copies of its scholarly output.

Physic gardens (700 AD), which were gardens of medicinal or healing herbs, were placed in squares surrounded by monastic cloisters. Later, these gardens added culinary herbs and orchards of unusual fruit and nut trees.

== See also ==
- Abbeys and priories in England
- Abbeys and priories in Northern Ireland
- Abbeys and priories in Scotland
- Abbeys and priories in Wales
- Celtic tonsure
- Penance in the Celtic church
- Rosnat
