= Anglo-Saxon mission =

Christian Missions undertaken by Anglo-Saxons

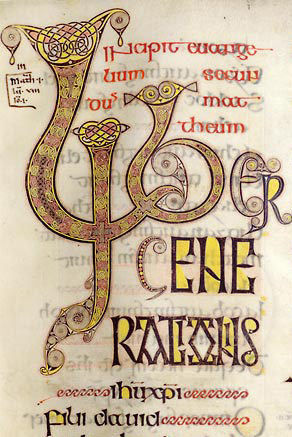
Echternach Gospels

Anglo-Saxon missionaries were instrumental in the spread of Christianity in the Frankish Empire during the 8th century, continuing the work of Hiberno-Scottish missionaries which had been spreading Celtic Christianity across the Frankish Empire as well as in Scotland and Anglo-Saxon England itself during the 6th century (see Anglo-Saxon Christianity). Both Ecgberht of Ripon and Ecgbert of York were instrumental in the Anglo-Saxon mission. The first organized the early missionary efforts of Wihtberht, Willibrord, and others; while many of the later missioners made their early studies at York.

== History ==
=== Early efforts ===
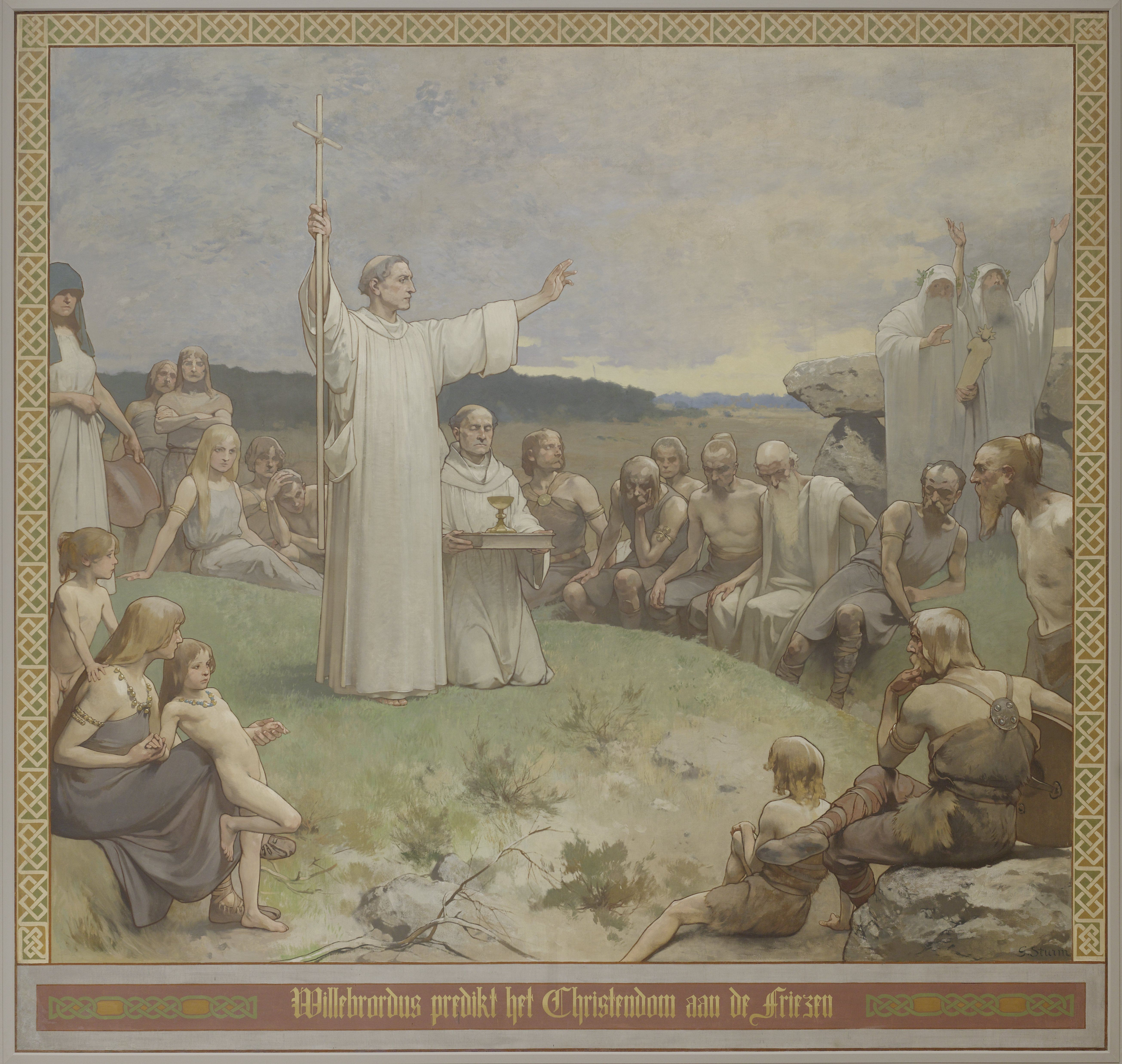
Willibrord preaching to the Frisians

Ecgberht of Ripon, who had studied at Rath Melsigi in Ireland, began to organize monks to proselytize in Frisia; many other high-born notables were associated with his work: Adalbert of Egmond, and Chad of Mercia. He, however, was dissuaded from accompanying them himself by a vision related to him by a monk who had been a disciple of Boisil (Prior of Melrose Abbey under Abbot Eata).

Around 680 AD, Ecgberht instead dispatched Wihtberht, an Anglo-Saxon of noble birth, also living at Rath Melsigi, to Frisia, but owing to the opposition of the ruler Redbad, King of the Frisians, Wihtberht was unsuccessful and returned to England.

Ecgberht then arranged the mission of Willibrord, and others to the heathens. Pepin II, who wished to extend his influence in the Low Countries, granted free passage to Rome to Willibrord, to be consecrated Bishop of Frisia; Norman F. Cantor singles this out as the first joint project between Carolingians and the Papacy: "It set the pattern for their increasing association in the first half of the 8th century as a result of their joint support of the efforts of the Anglo-Saxon missionaries."

=== Boniface ===
Notable among these missionaries is Saint Boniface who was active in the area of Fulda (modern Hesse), establishing or re-establishing the bishoprics of Erfurt, Würzburg, Büraburg, as well as Eichstätt, Regensburg, Augsburg, Freising, Passau and Salzburg (739) further to the south-east.

Boniface, who had taught at the abbey school of the Benedictine monastery at Nhutscelle, first left for the continent in 716. He joined Willibrord in Utrecht, who had been working since the 690s among the Frisians. Their efforts were frustrated by the war between Charles Martel and Redbad, King of the Frisians. Willibrord fled to the abbey he had founded in Echternach, while Boniface returned to Nursling. The following year he traveled to Rome, where he was commissioned by Pope Gregory II as a traveling missionary bishop for Germania.

He urged monks to come to the continental missions, from which their forebears had come: "Take pity upon them, for they themselves are saying, 'We are of one blood and one bone with you.'" The missions, which drew from the energy and initiative of the English church, spread south and east from there. Almost immediately the Anglo-Saxon missionaries came in contact with the Pippinids, the new dominant family in Frankish territories.

=== Other missionaries ===
Other Anglo-Saxon missionaries to the continent include Ewald, Lebuin, Leoba, and Suidbert.

Saint Walpurga (Walburga) and her brothers Saint Willibald and Saint Winibald assisted Boniface, Willibald founding the Heidenheim monastery.

== Monasteries ==
Anglo-Saxon abbeys established on the continent were sometimes family monasteries. The earliest monastery founded by Anglo-Saxons on the continent is Willibrord's Abbey of Echternach (698), founded at a villa granted him by a daughter of Dagobert II. Alcuin, in his Life of Willibrord states the Willibrord's successor, Aldberct, was a kinsman of Willibrord and distantly related to himself. Beornrad, who became the third abbot in 775, was related by blood to Willibrord, and cousin to Alcuin. Even after being appointed Archbishop of Sens, Beornrad retained the abbacy of Echternach. Thus, Willibrord's family ruled the abbey for its first 100 years.

Willehad was born in Northumbria and probably received his education at York under Bishop Ecgbert of York. He commenced his missionary activities among the Frisians about 766. In 780 he preached in the region of the lower Weser River on commission from Charlemagne, and later among the Saxons. After the Saxon rebellion in 782, it was from Echternach that Willehad resumed his missionary activities, to be later consecrated bishop of Bremen. It was later believed (through Alcuin) that Willehad was a relative of Beornrad.

== Legacy ==
Anglo-Saxon missionary activities continued into the 770s and the reign of Charlemagne, the Anglo-Saxon Alcuin playing a major part in the Carolingian Renaissance. By 800, the Carolingian Empire was essentially Christianized, and further missionary activity, such as the Christianization of Scandinavia and the Baltic was coordinated directly from the Holy Roman Empire rather than from England.

In the judgement of J. R. R. Tolkien the Anglo-Saxon mission was "…one of the chief glories of ancient England, and one of our chief services to Europe even regarding all our history…."

== See also ==
- Christianization of the Germanic peoples
