= Kaiserpfalz Kaiserswerth =

Coordinates: 51.2995°N 6.7318°E

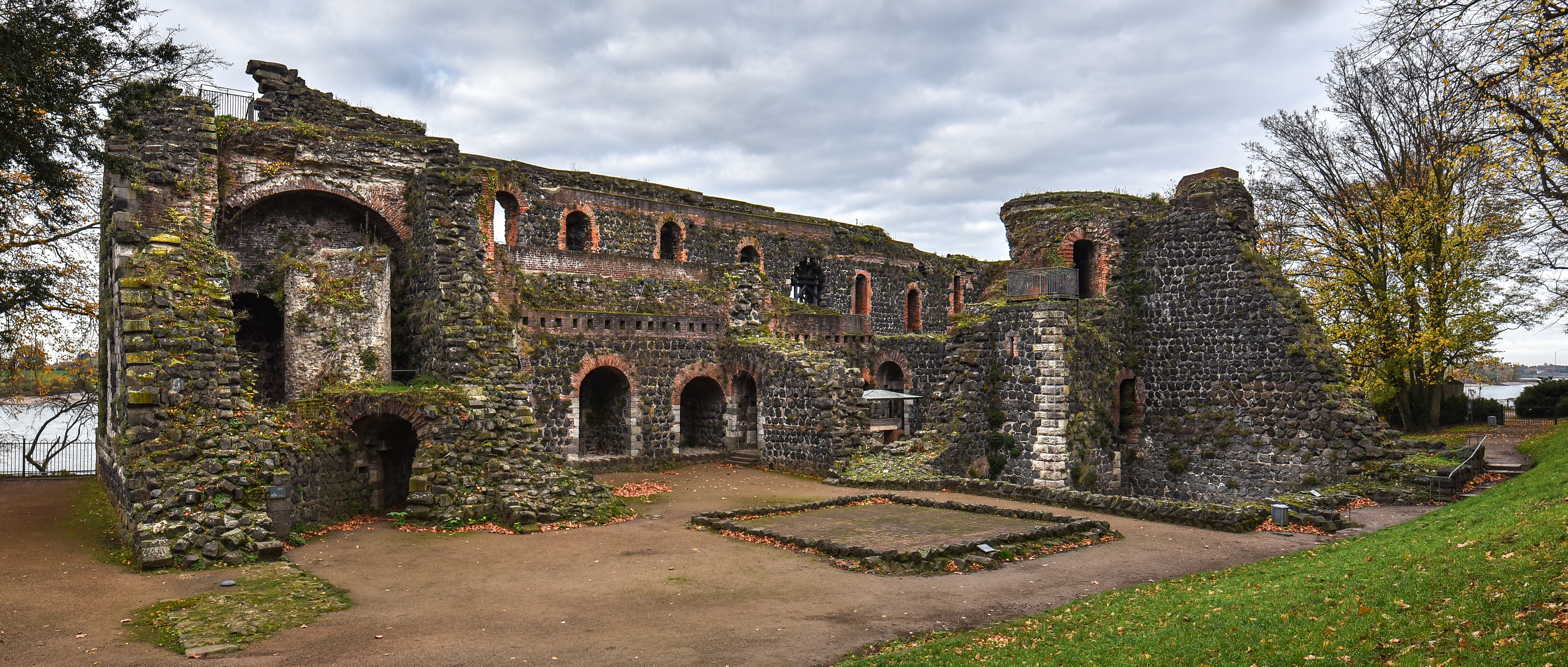
The remains of the Kaiserpfalz (2020)

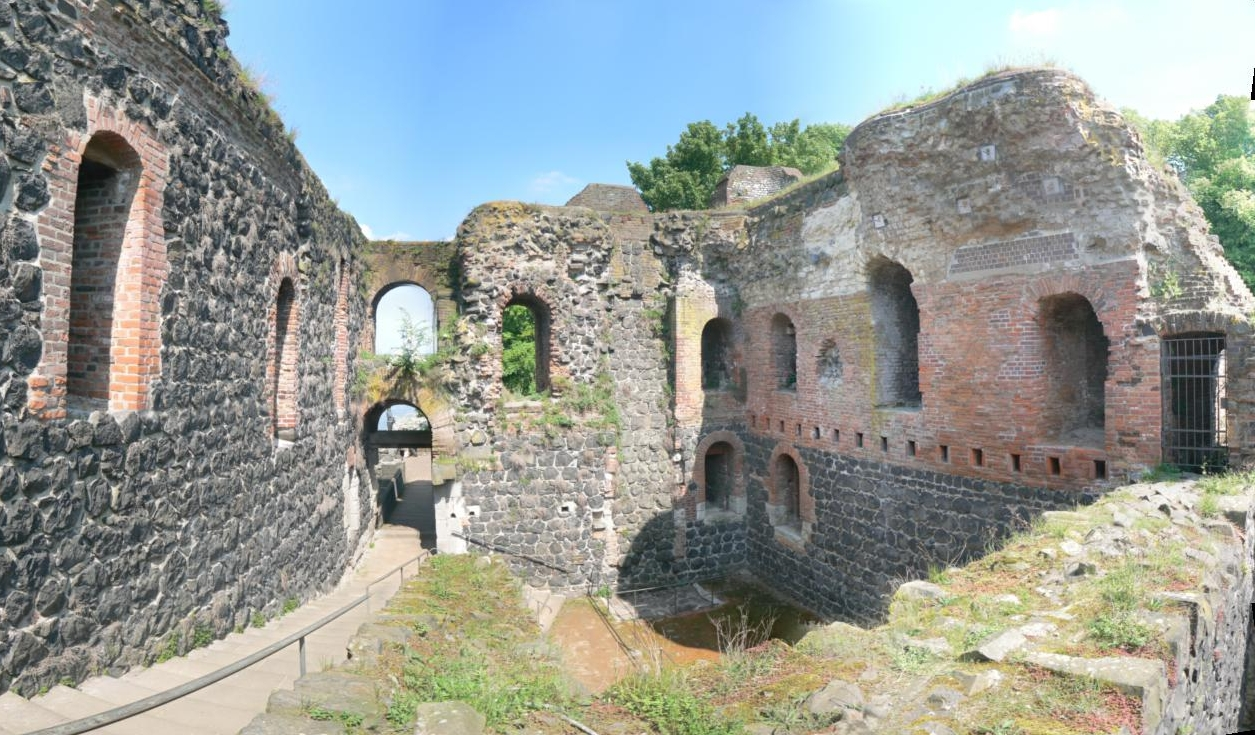
Inside view of the ruin (2009)

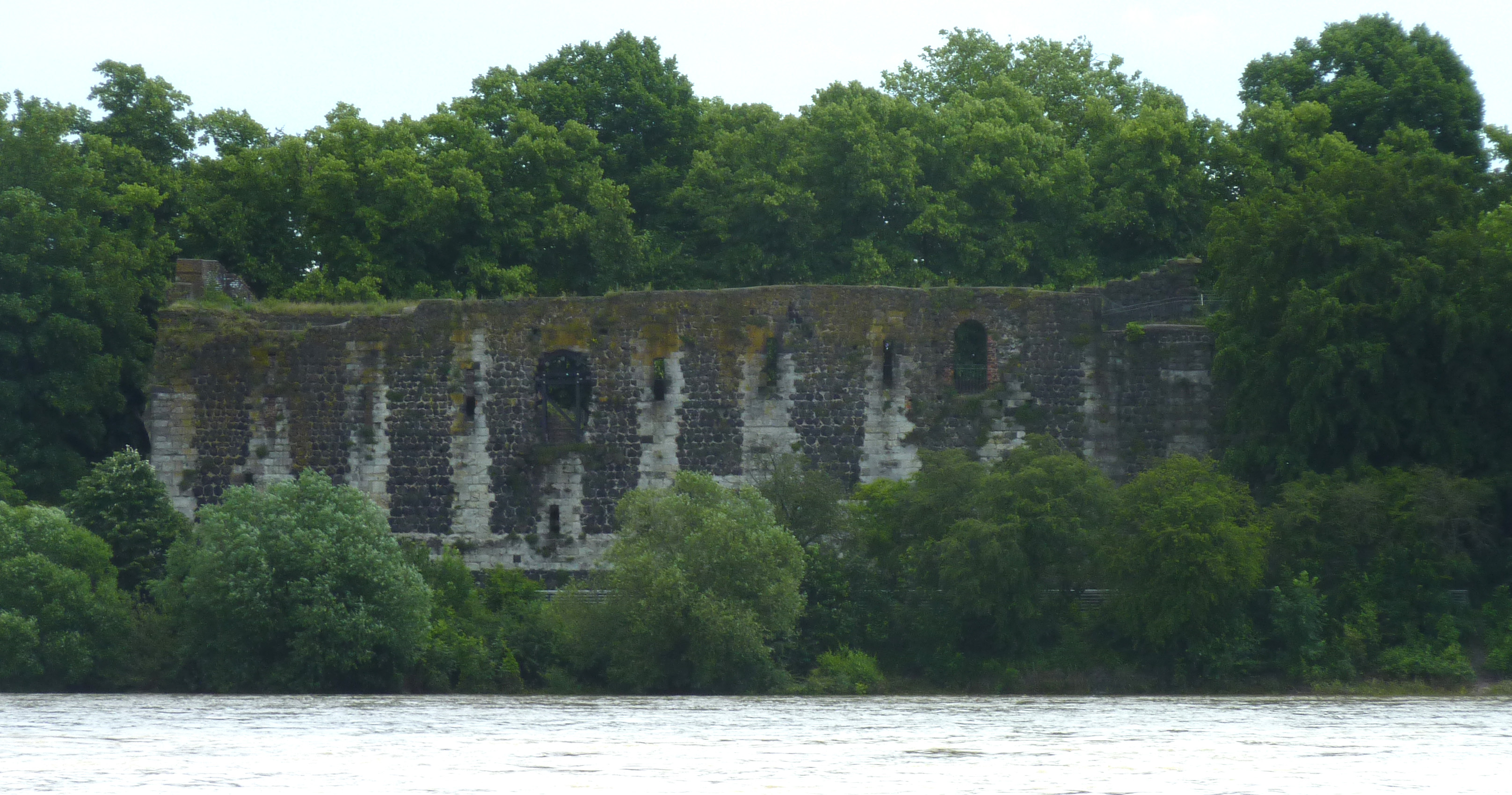
The ruin as seen from the river Rhine.

The ruin of the Kaiserpfalz Kaiserswerth is located in the Kaiserswerth district of Düsseldorf, Germany. This Kaiserpfalz dates back to a monastery founded by the monk Suitbert(us) around 700 AD. At that time, the Frankish House Emperor Pepin of Herstal and his wife Plectrude gave the Anglo-Saxon monk a Rhine island which was created by circling the old arm of the Rhine, on which there was already a "Frankish Fronhof" protected by an earth wall, moat and palisades. In the following period, it developed into a fortified customs stronghold.

On December 23, 1982, the complex was entered in the city's list of monuments in the category of castles, manor houses, fortifications and palaces.

The name Kaiserswerth is derived from the Middle High German word werth for island. It therefore means imperial island or island of the emperor.

== History ==
=== Development into a royal court ===
The location of the Fronhof and the monastery was well chosen: On the one hand, the Rhine is clearly visible from there, and on the other, two important trade routes, the Hellweg into the interior of Germania and the old Roman trade route between Xanten and Neuss, met there.

A castle there was first mentioned in documents in 1016. In that year, Emperor Henry II reconciled with Count Palatine Ezzo of Lotharingia and gave him Kaiserswerth and the castle. Ezzo's son Otto returned the gift to him in 1045 in return for his appointment as Duke of Swabia by King Henry III. Shortly afterwards, Henry III had the existing castle extended into a royal palace. By 1050, the construction work had progressed so far that he was able to spend some time there with his retinue. There is evidence that Henry III visited Kaiserswerth four more times before his death in 1056. Although this first Salian complex has completely disappeared today, it made Kaiserswerth the suburb of the Duisburg-Kaiserswerth county at the time.

=== Coup of Kaiserswerth ===
After his death in 1056, Henry III left behind his six-year-old son Henry IV, whose mother Agnes of Poitou continued the regency for her underage son, which was met with disapproval by numerous princes of the holy roman empire. At the head of a group of conspirators, Archbishop Anno II of Cologne therefore had Henry IV abducted during a visit to Kaiserswerth in 1062 in order to bring him under his influence. As a result, Henry's relationship with the church was disturbed throughout his life. And he only visited the Palatinate once more in his life: for the Assembly of Princes in 1101.

=== Frederick Barbarossa and Henry VI ===
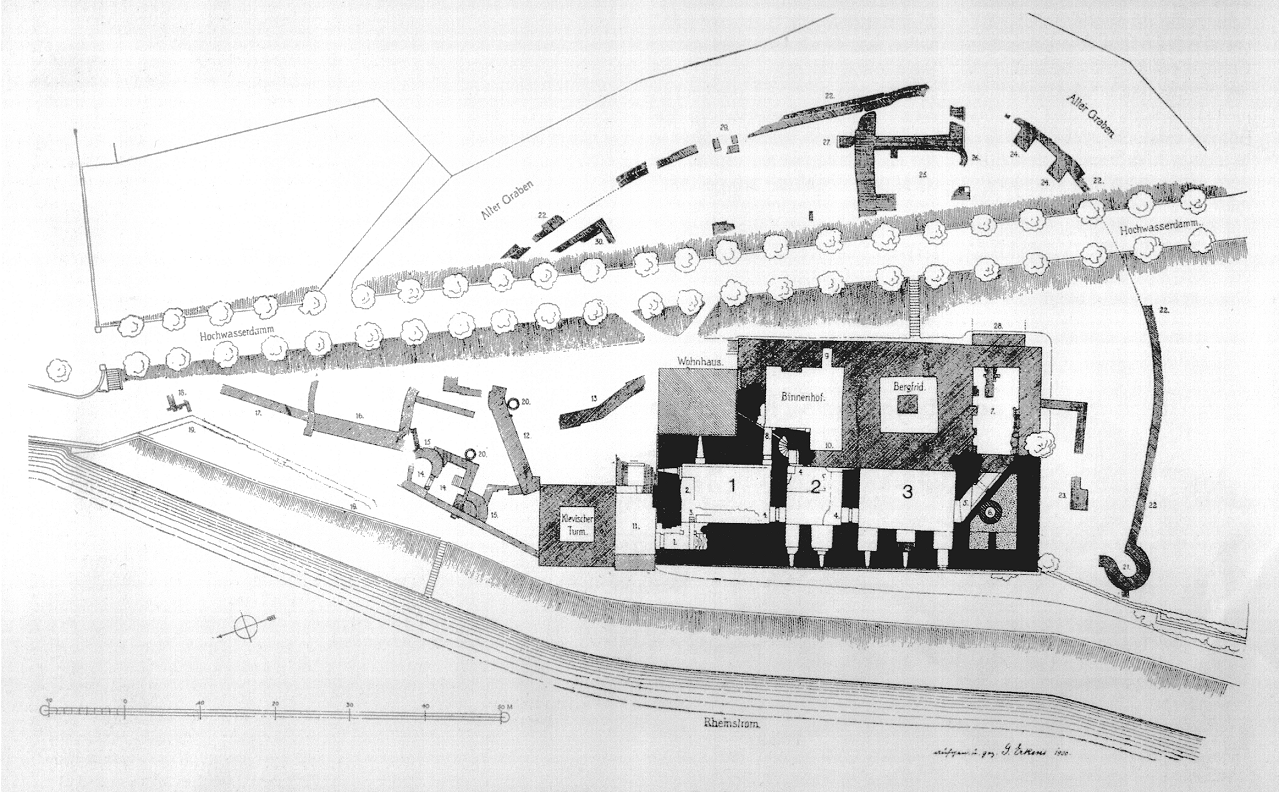
Ground plan of the Kaiserpfalz grounds with the foundations excavated under the direction of Paul Clemen at the beginning of the 20th century, drawing by Gisbert Erkens (1866–1938)

In 1174, Emperor Frederick Barbarossa moved the "Rhine toll" from the Dutch town of Tiel to Kaiserswerth. To this end, he had Kaiserswerth expanded into a fortification, which was not completed in 1184, as is often claimed, but probably in 1193 under his son Henry VI. The remains of the imperial palace that can be seen today date from this period.

The complex was not designed as a permanent residence, and there is only evidence of a single stay by Barbarossa on April 22, 1158. However, numerous documents issued in Kaiserswerth bear witness to stays by later emperors, such as Henry V, Conrad III, Henry VI, Otto IV and Henry VII.

After being extended by Emperor Barbarossa, the Kaiserpfalz consisted of a three-storey palas with a mighty Bergfried in the middle. The main entrance was located in the Klever Tower to the north-east. A semi-circular enclosure wall with a moat in front and two corner towers offered protection from the land side.

=== End of insularity ===
After the death of Henry VI, the Kaiserpfalz came into the hands of Cologne and the Welfs. Otto IV held prominent prisoners here, such as the Prince-Bishop of Münster, Otto I, count of Oldenburg, a partisan of Frederick II, in 1214/15 as part of the German throne dispute. Otto's friend Adolf VI, count of Berg tried unsuccessfully five times to free him by attacking "from the water". On his sixth attempt in 1215, he used a ruse. He had the artificial arm of the Rhine, which turned Kaiserswerth into an island, diverted to the south of the town. The riverbed was thus drained. The Palatinate could now be attacked from the land side and the Bishop of Münster could be freed.

In 1247, Count William II of Holland, who was elected as Frederick II's anti-king, besieged the castle for a year. Its defenders were eventually forced to surrender as they had probably run out of food supplies.

=== War of the Spanish Succession ===
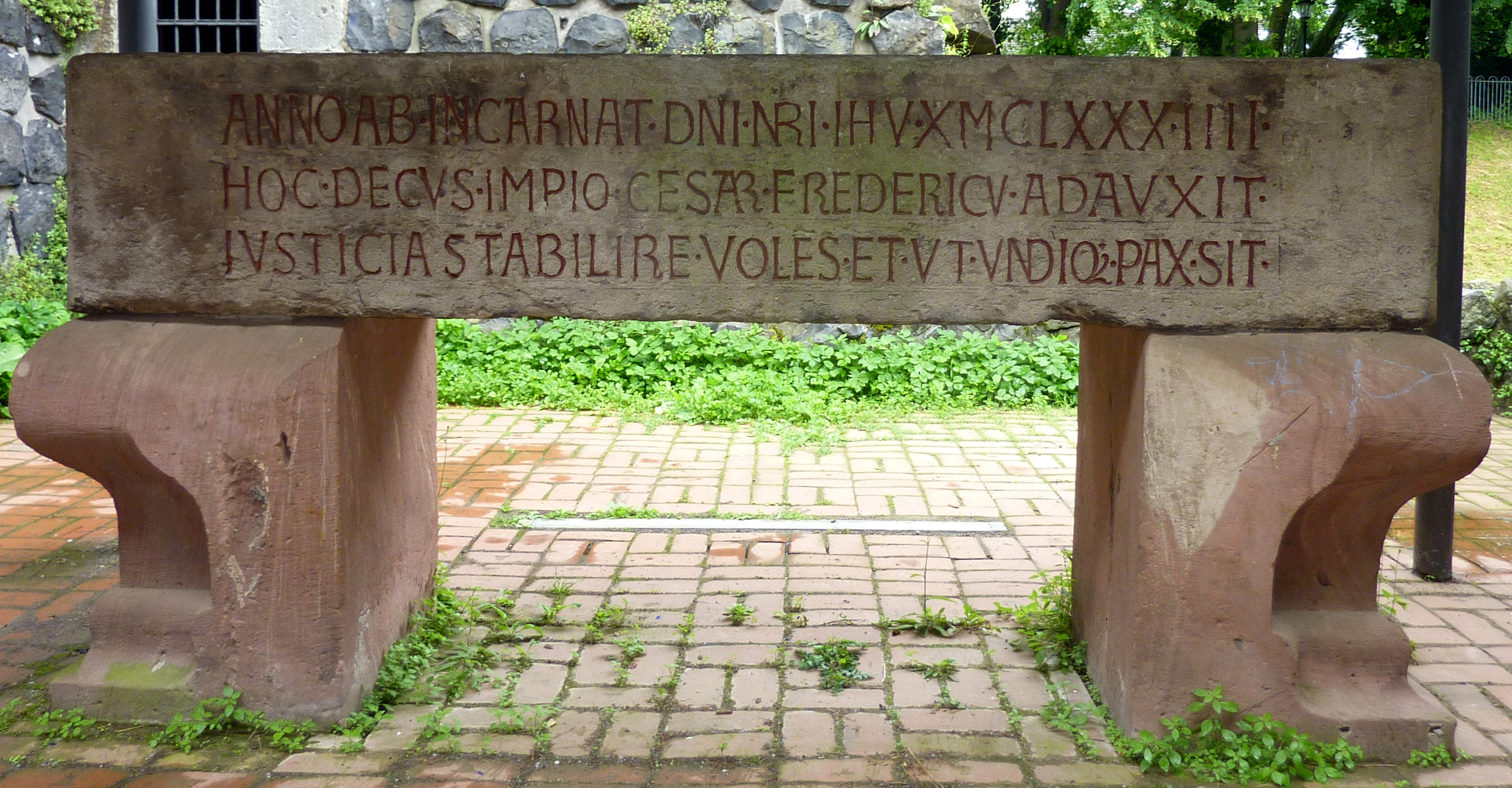
The former portal stone of the main entrance to the Kaiserpfalz

The War of the Spanish Succession broke out in 1702. The Prince-Elector of Cologne, Joseph Clemens, sided with France again and made an enemy of the Duke of Jülich-Berg, Johann Wilhelm II (also known as Jan Wellem), Elector Palatine and Lord High Steward of the German Empire. In the spring, troops from Brandenburg, the Netherlands and England laid siege to Kaiserswerth, capturing it on June 15, 1702.

12,000 cannon shots had clearly left their mark: Almost all the houses in the town were destroyed and the palace complex was badly damaged. On the orders of Johann Wilhelm II, it was razed and blown up on August 9. The mighty Bergfried also fell victim to this demolition and the land side of the complex was completely destroyed. At low tide, large chunks of masonry are still visible in the gravel bed on the riverbank.

The mighty portal stone, which was walled in as a lintel above the main entrance to the Klever Tower, was taken to Düsseldorf as spoils of war and placed in the courtyard of Schloss Benrath there for 150 years. Today it is back on the grounds of the Kaiserpfalz. Its Latin inscription reads in English "In the year 1184 after the incarnation of our Lord Jesus Christ, Emperor Frederick increased the empire with this ornament, willing to consolidate justice and that peace may reign everywhere."

The Treaty of Rastatt returned Kaiserswerth to the Prince-Electorate of Cologne in 1714. The imperial palace was then taken over by the town of Kaiserswerth in 1838.

=== The Kaiserpfalz in the 19th and 20th Century ===
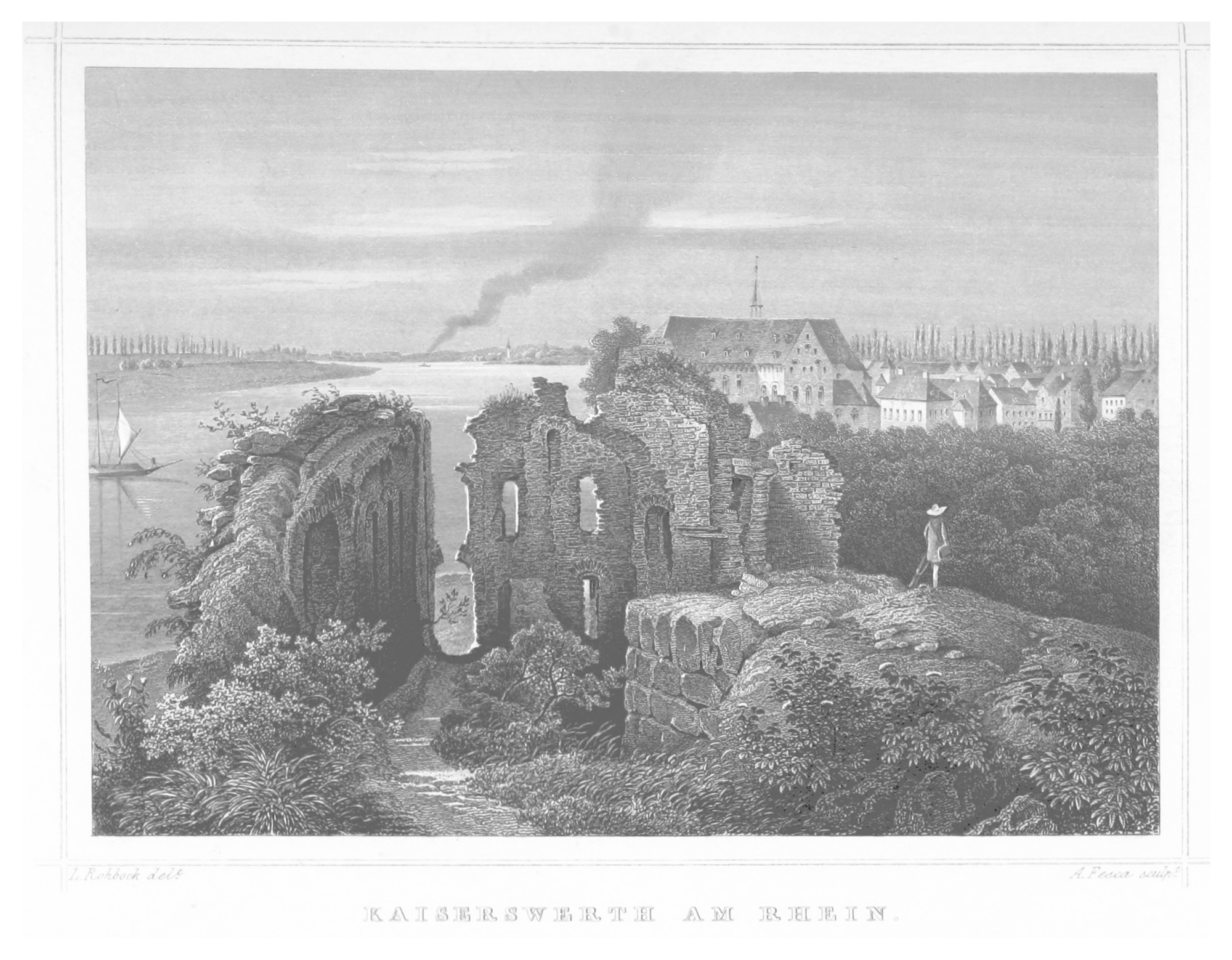
Depiction of the ruins of Kaiserswerth Castle in an illustration by Johann Poppel, 1852

The remaining ruins were used as a quarry for the townhouses for almost two centuries, so that by the middle of the 19th century the eastern side of the complex had been demolished down to the foundation walls. In 1884, the construction of a flood dam, which ran right through the Kaiserpfalz grounds, destroyed further buildings.

During the Third Reich, the Kaiserpfalz served as a national memorial and regular meeting place for the Düsseldorf Hitler Youth (HY), who held propaganda events and nightly torchlight illuminations there. The HY "place of honor" was inaugurated by Baldur von Schirach in 1933. There was a memorial plaque for 21 Hitler Youth victims and an "eternal" Schlageter flame in memory of the Freikorp fighter and extreme right-wing saboteur Albert Leo Schlageter.

=== The Kaiserpfalz today ===
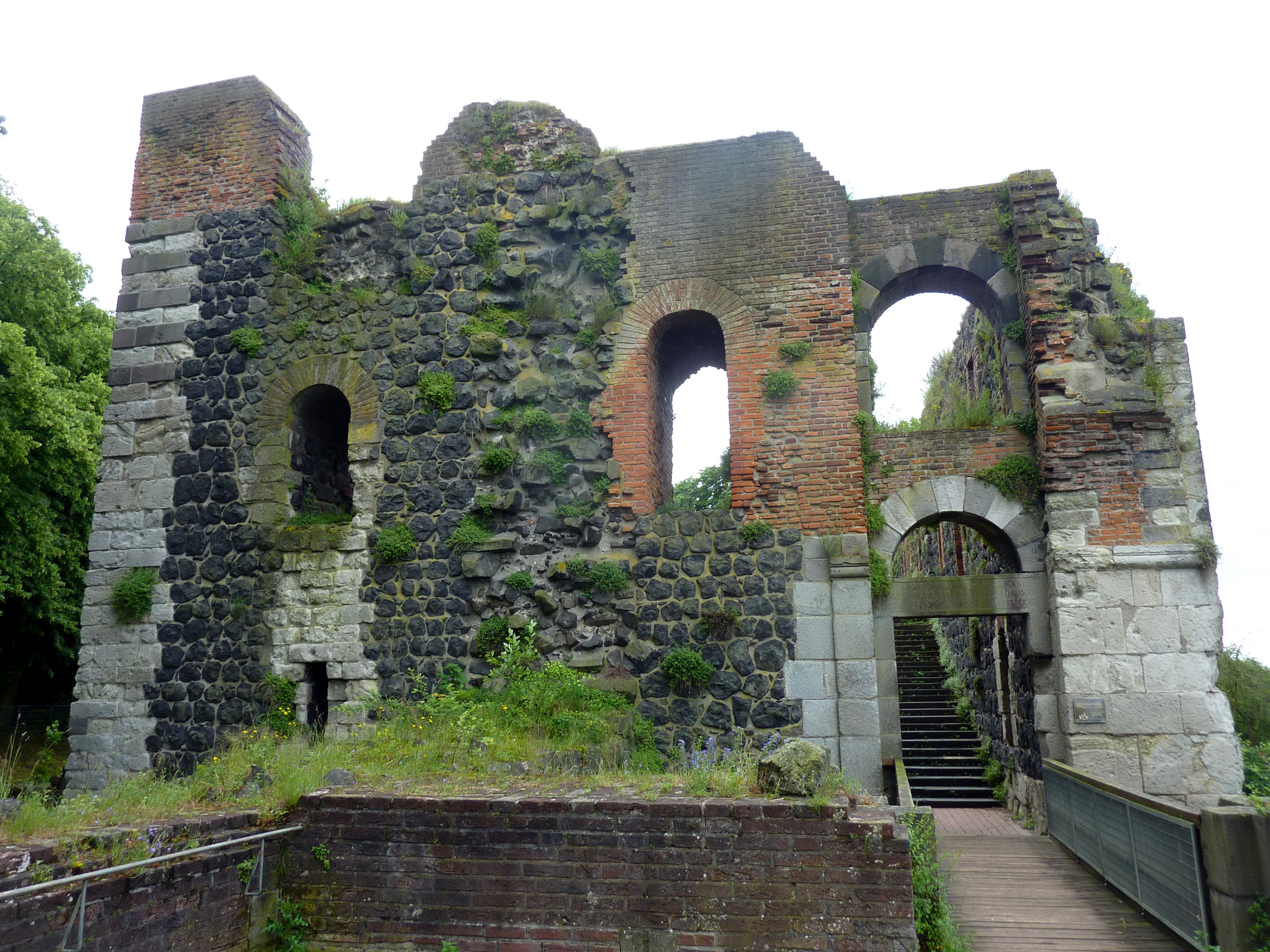
Today's entrance with replica of the portal stone

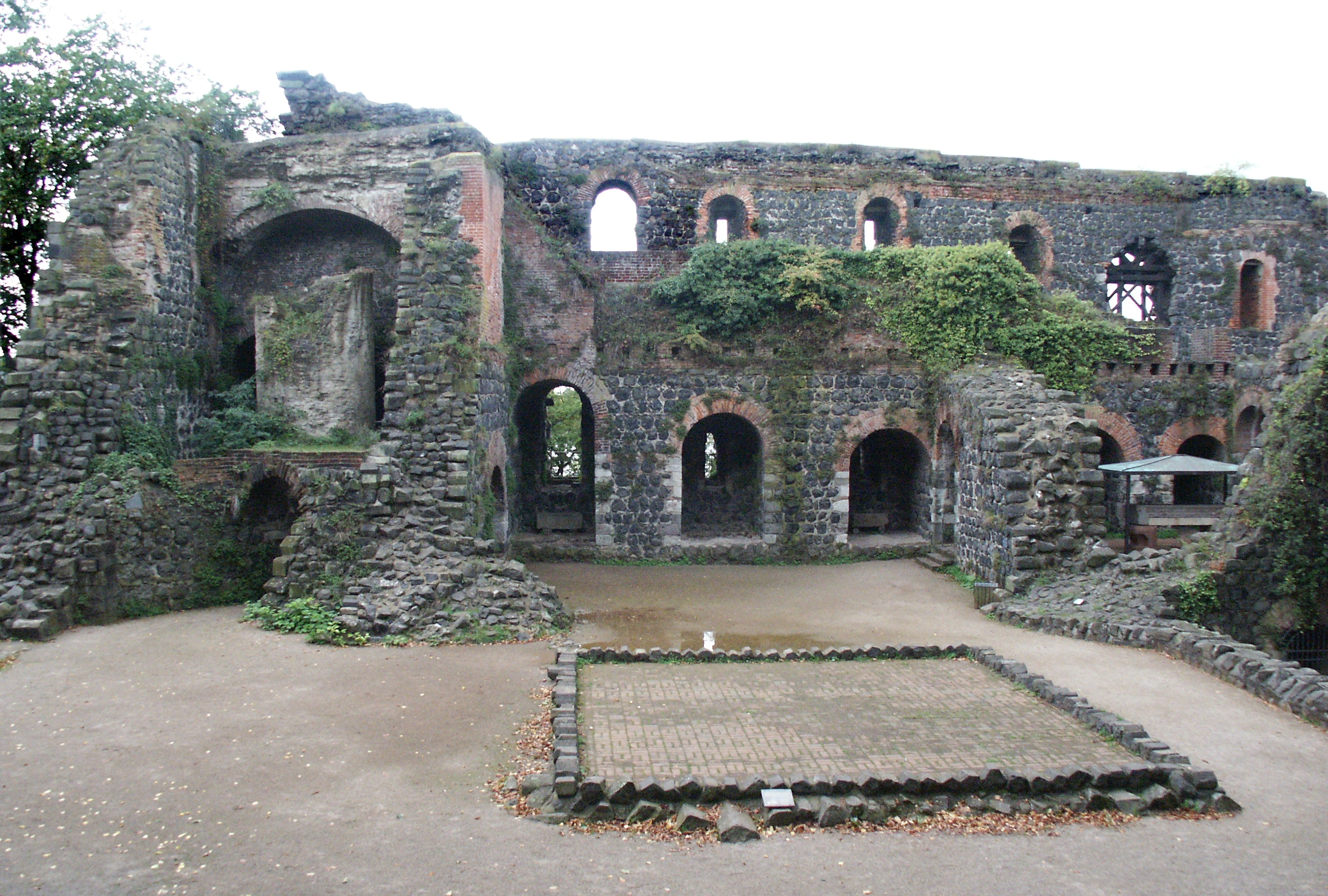
West wall of the palas with the marked area of the former keep interior in the foreground and the cylindrical remains of the cistern on the left

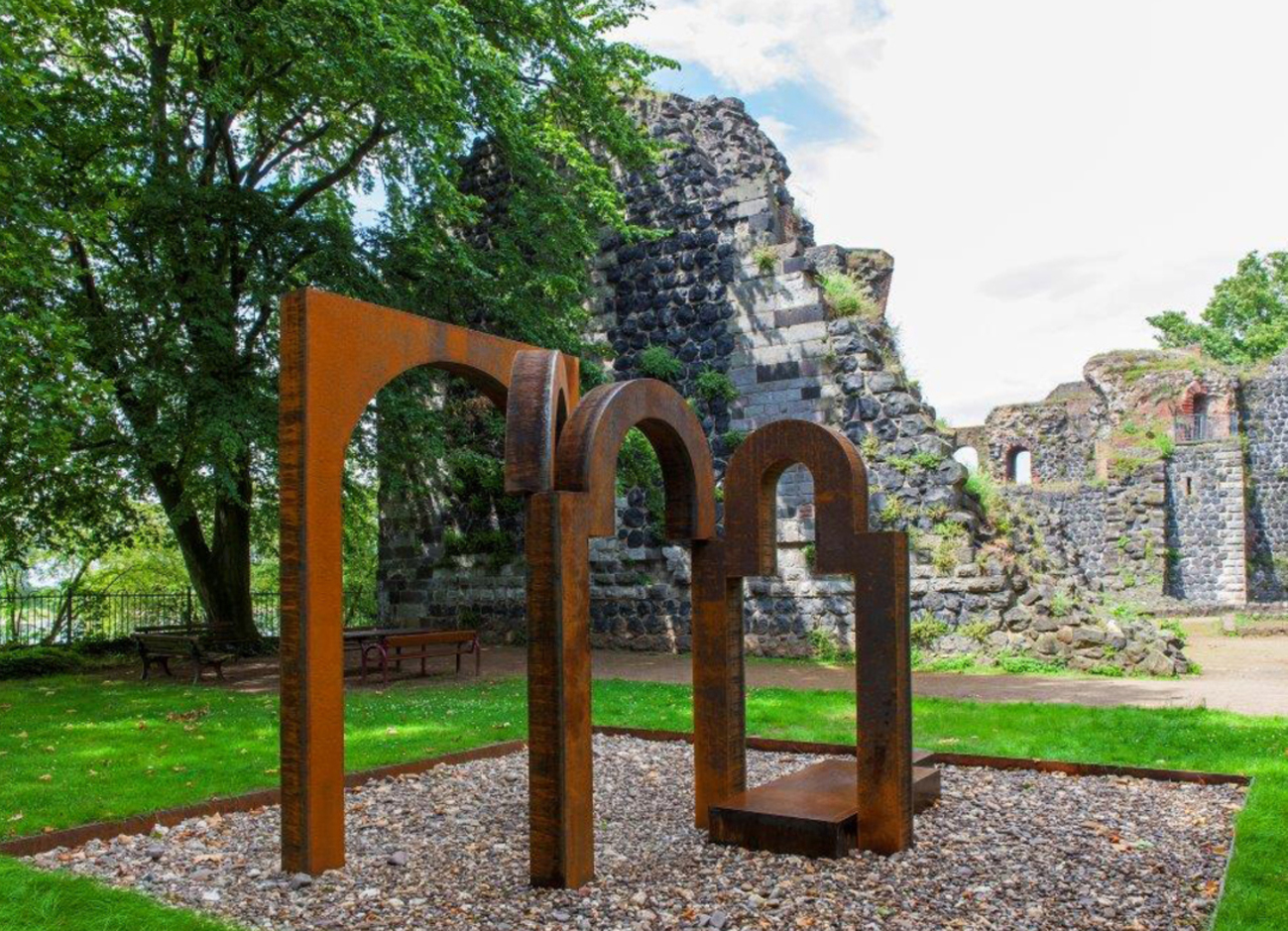
Sculpture “In context”, Peter Schwickerath (2014)

In connection with Kaiserswerth's 1300th anniversary celebrations, the palas ruins were restored from 1997 to 2001. The northern and southern parts have been preserved, while no traces of the eastern half of the complex remain above ground.

Despite the destruction, the six-metre-thick west front of the palace on the Rhine side is still 50 meters wide and 14 meters high. In its heyday, the building had one more storey than the wall that still stands today. It was built from irregular basalt blocks from Drachenfels and tuff. While large bricks were used for the round arches and vaults, gray trachyte blocks were used as cornerstones and window frames. An ancient inscription in the castle proves its origin: “As trachyte, I came from the Drachenfels, opening the doors to both skilled sailors and settlers.”

Archaeologists assume that the first floor of the palace housed the former utility rooms. However, this has not yet been proven beyond doubt. On the upper floor, there were representative and living rooms with brick vaulted ceilings, the beginnings of which are still recognizable. For example, the banqueting hall had a large balcony facing the Rhine. The floors were connected by a monumental main staircase two meters wide, which is still preserved today.

An area measuring eight by eight meters and paved with bricks on the palace grounds marks the interior of the former Bergfried, which was around 55 meters high and had walls around 4.5 meters thick, and was completely blown up on 9 August 1702.

Compared to other Romanesque buildings, the palace in Kaiserswerth has a special feature: In the southern part of the complex are the remains of an approximately nine-metre-high cylindrical structure made of bricks and tuff, which used to reach up to the second floor and which represents the remains of a former cistern system that was only built on top of the 13-metre-deep well made of trachyte blocks in electoral times. A layer of sand surrounding the well was used to purify collected rainwater and treat it for use as drinking water.

So far, only one cellar room in the palace complex is known. This had the special feature that it could be flooded in times of need and, it is assumed, used as a fish tank.

Today, a permanently installed wooden bridge replaces the former drawbridge, which was used to reach the palace from the Klever Tower. Under the drawbridge was the entrance to a small inland port fed by the Rhine. It was only during the most recent restoration work that the Klever Tower was restored to its present form: its ruins were rebuilt to illustrate the former access situation to the inner bailey. In 1980, the bronze sculpture "Sidu" by Rudolf Heekers was erected at one corner of its surrounding walls.

In 2014, sculptor Peter Schwickerath designed the sculpture Im Kontext, made from a single steel slab, for visitors to walk through. The walk-through steel sculpture creates a new spatial perception of the Kaiserpfalz, takes up the Romanesque round arch as a defining stylistic element and places it at the center of the view.
