= Anglo-Saxon religion =

Anglo-Saxon religion may refer to:

- Anglo-Saxon paganism
- Christianity in Anglo-Saxon England
- Anglo-Saxon mission in the Frankish Empire during the 8th century
- Anglicanism
- Revival of Anglo-Saxon paganism as part of Heathenry (new religious movement)
