= Suitbert =

Suitbert, Suidbert, or Swithbert may refer to:

- An Alemannic chieftain who founded the town of Schwieberdingen
- Saint Suitbert of Kaiserwerdt
- Saint Suitbert the Younger
- Suitbert Bäumer, historian
