= High Steward =

High Steward or Lord High Steward may refer to:

- High Steward (academia) in the universities of Oxford and Cambridge
- High steward (Ancient Egypt), in the Middle Kingdom and the New Kingdom
- High steward (civic) of various towns in England
- Lord High Steward of England
- Lord High Steward of Ireland
- High Steward of Scotland
- Lord High Steward of Sweden
- High Steward of Westminster Abbey
- Grand Master of France
- Mayordomo mayor, High Steward of Spain
- Obersthofmeister, Lord High Steward of Austria
