= Adalbert of Egmond =

Northumbrian Anglo-Saxon missionary

Saint Adalbert of Egmond
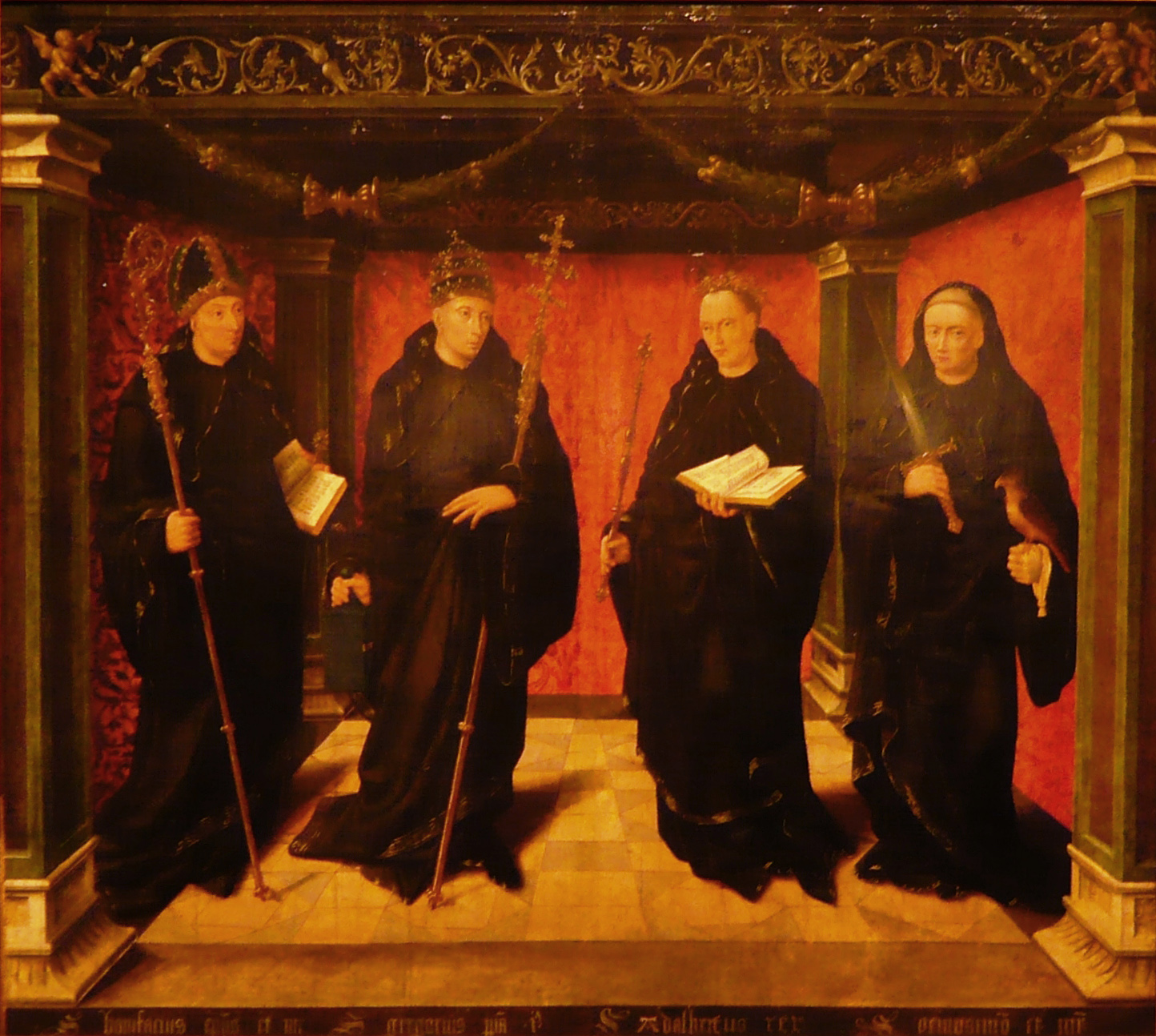
- Painting of Saints Bonifatius, Gregorius, Adelbert, and priest Jeroen van Noordwijk, by Jan Joesten van Hillegom, 1530
- Born: Northumbria
- Died: c. 710; Egmond
- Venerated in: Anglican Communion; Roman Catholic Church; Eastern Orthodox Church
- Canonized: Pre-Congregation
- Feast: 25 June

Adalbert of Egmond (also called Æthelberht of Egmond) (died c. 710 in Egmond) was a Northumbrian Anglo-Saxon missionary. He was one of Willibrord's companions in preaching the gospel in Holland and Frisia.

== Biography ==
Adalbert (or Æthelberht) is said to have been born in Northumbria, a member of the Northumbrian royal family. According to some sources, Adalbert studied at the Rath Melsigi) in Ireland with Egbert. Around 690 he went to assist Willibrord (who had also been at Rath Melsigi) in the mission field of Frisia. According to Alcuin's late eighth-century Vita Willibrordi archiepiscopi Traiectensis, they landed near Domburg.

Adelbert became associated particularly with Egmond. He was made Archdeacon of the recently founded See of Utrecht and died at Egmund about A.D. 740. He was buried there, and miracles were reported at his tomb, over which a church was built. Adalbert is said to have shielded the settlement of Egmond from pirates by causing a fog to arise along the coast.

== Veneration ==
His continued remembrance rests largely on the foundation of the Benedictine monastery, Egmond Abbey, the first in the country, some two hundred years later by Count Dirk I of West Frisia (or Holland), of which Adalbert was made the patron. The Vita was not commissioned until the 990s, which presumably accounts for its lack of facts. Adalbert's relics were translated to the newly built abbey (initially a nunnery) for veneration. After the Reformation and the destruction of the abbey, they were preserved in Haarlem. The cult was reinstated when the abbey was re-founded in 1935, and the relics were returned there in 1984. The saint's skull, painstakingly restored, is also preserved beneath the high altar. His feast day is 25 June.
