= Wihtberht =

Anglo-Saxon Benedictine monk and missionary honored as a saint (675-747)

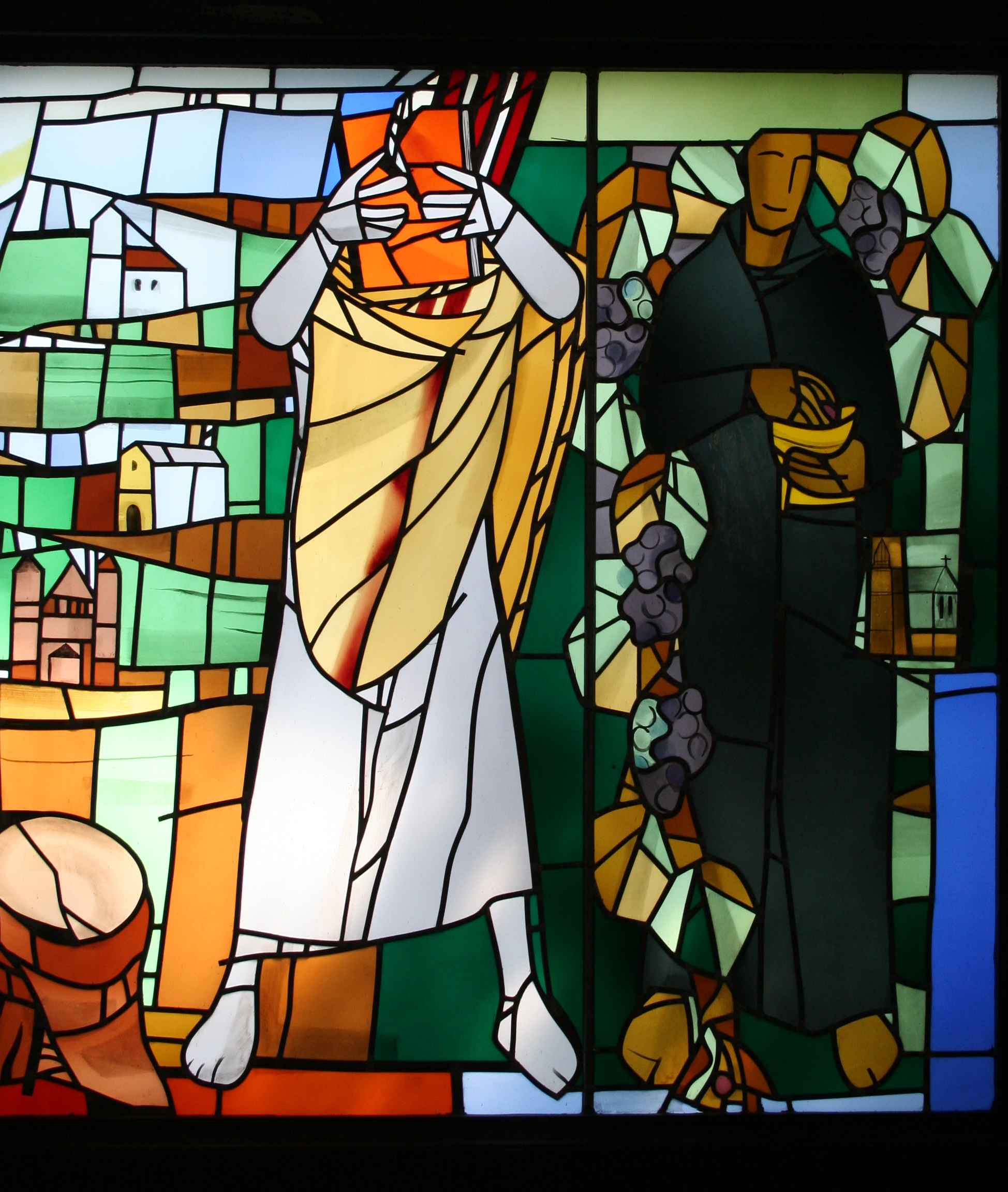
Saint Wigbert and Saint Boniface. Stained glass window by Alois Plum.

Wihtberht or Wigbert (May 7, 675 – August 13, 747) born in Wessex around 675, was an Anglo-Saxon Benedictine monk and a missionary and disciple of Boniface who travelled with the latter in Frisia and northern and central Germany to convert the local tribes to Christianity. His feast day is August 13th in the Roman Catholic Church and on April 12th in the Eastern Orthodox Church.

== Life ==
Wihtberht was an Englishman of noble birth, who embraced the monastic life. It has been supposed that Wihtberht was a monk of Glastonbury, but Löffler finds this improbable.

== Character ==
At times an anchorite, and hermit he was known for his missionary work, miracles and prophecies. He is known to history mainly through Alcuin and Bede and is mentioned in the Secgan Hagiography. Alcuin described him as venerable, and outstanding in his religious practice while Bede admired his contempt of this world and his learning. He worked mainly in Ireland.

== First mission ==
Around 664 Wihtberht was studying at Rath Melsigi in Ireland. Also there was Ecgberht of Ripon, who had gone to Ireland to avoid an outbreak of the plague in Northumbria. However, Ecgberht and many of the students contracted the disease. Ecgberht vowed that if he recovered, he would become a "peregrinus" on perpetual pilgrimage from his homeland of Britain and would lead a life of penitential prayer and fasting. He began to organize monks in Ireland to proselytize in Frisia, but was dissuaded from going himself by a vision related to him by a monk who had been a disciple of Boisil (the Prior of Melrose under Abbot Eata), who advised him that this task was not for him. Ecgberht instead sent Wihtberht. Around 680, Wihtberht, went to Frisia, where he spent two years; but owing to the opposition of the ruler Redbad, King of the Frisians, Wihtberht was unsuccessful and returned. Wihtberht’s reputation among the Irish was such that he was celebrated in the ninth-century Irish martyrology, Félire Óengusso.

== Second mission ==
When Boniface felled Thor's Oak near Fritzlar in northern Hesse in 723, he built a wooden chapel from the oak's wood and in 724 established a Benedictine monastery in Fritzlar. Boniface called Wihtberht from England to become the abbot. Wihtberht was certainly older than Boniface. He went to Germany about 734, and Boniface made him abbot of the monastery of Hersfeld in Hesse. Under the new abbot the school soon became famous. Among his pupils there was Sturmi, the first Abbot of Fulda.

About 737 Boniface transferred him to Thuringia as Abbot of Ohrdruf, where he established a school for missionaries operating in Thuringia. Wihtberht died in 747, and was initially buried in Fritzlar in the stone basilica he had built to replace the original wooden chapel. His former student, Lullus later had most of his body (except for a few sacred relics which remained in Fritzlar) interred in a gold and silver shrine in Hersfeld Abbey. Wihtberht is patron saint of the town of Bad Hersfeld. His feast day is August 13.

== Legacy ==
The Priory of St Wigbert (Priorat Sankt Wigberti) is an ecumenical Benedictine monastery for men, belonging to the Lutheran Church of Thuringia, located in Werningshausen, Germany.

== See also ==
- Willibrord
