= Ecgberht of Ripon =

Anglo-Saxon monk

Saint Ecgberht
- Born: 639; England
- Died: 729; Iona
- Venerated in: Catholic Church; Eastern Orthodox Church
- Major shrine: Ripon
- Feast: 24 April (Catholic Church); 23 December (Eastern Orthodox Church)

Ecgberht (or Egbert, and sometimes referred to as Egbert of Rath Melsigi) (died 729) was an Anglo-Saxon monk of Northumbria. After studying at Lindisfarne and Rath Melsigi, he spent his life travelling among monasteries in northern Britain and around the Irish Sea. He was instrumental in the establishment of Wihtberht's mission to Frisia.

== Life ==
Ecgberht was an Anglo-Saxon of a noble family, probably from Northumbria. After some years of study in the monastery of Lindisfarne, he travelled to Ireland to study. One of his acquaintances at this time was Chad of Mercia. He settled at the monastery of Rath Melsigi, in modern-day county Carlow. In 664, most of his Northumbrian travelling companions, including Æthelhun, died of the plague, and he contracted it as well.

Ecgberht vowed that if he recovered, he would become a "peregrinus" on perpetual pilgrimage from his homeland of Britain and would lead a life of penitential prayer and fasting. He was twenty-five, and when he recovered he kept his vow until his death at age 90. According to Henry Mayr-Harting, Ecgberht was one of the most famous ‘pilgrims’ of the early Middle Ages, and occupied a prominent position in a political and religious culture that spanned northern Britain and the Irish Sea.

Ecgberht was ordained a priest and began to organize monks in Ireland to proselytize in Frisia; many other high-born notables were associated with his work: Adalbert, Swithbert, and Chad. He, however, was dissuaded from accompanying them himself by a vision related to him by a monk who had been a disciple of Boisil (the Prior of Melrose under Abbot Eata). Ecgberht instead dispatched Wihtberht, another Englishman living at Rath Melsigi, to Frisia. Ecgberht then arranged the mission of Wigbert, Willibrord, and others.

In 684, he tried to dissuade King Ecgfrith of Northumbria from sending an expedition to Ireland under his general Berht, but he was unsuccessful.

While in Ireland, Ecgberht was one of those present at the Synod of Birr in 697, when the Cáin Adomnáin was guaranteed.

Ecgberht had influential contacts with the kings of Northumbria and of the Picts, as well as with Iona, to which he moved around 716. He attempted to persuade the monks there to adopt the Roman Easter dating. He died on Iona at the age of ninety, on the first day that the Easter feast was observed in this manner in the monastery, on 24 April 729.

His feast day in the Roman Catholic Church, 24 April, is found in both the Roman and Irish martyrologies, and in the Metrical Calendar of York. Although he is now honoured simply as a confessor, it is probable that Ecgberht was a bishop.

In the Eastern Orthodox Church, his feast day is celebrated on 23 December (which falls on 5 January NS for those on the patristic calendar) .

Ecgberht ought not to be confused with the later Ecgberht, Archbishop of York, or Egbert of Lindisfarne.
