= Suitbert of Kaiserswerth =

Christian missionary and saint

Swidberth of Kaiserwerdt
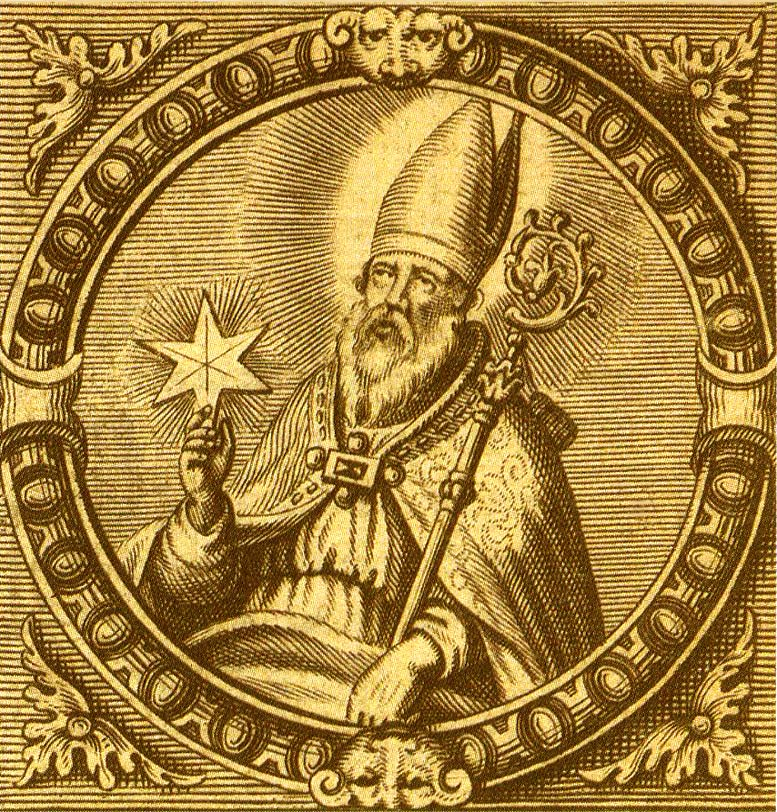
- Suitbertus

Missionary
- Born: Northumbria
- Died: 713; Suitberts-Insel, now Kaiserswerth
- Venerated in: Roman Catholic Church; Eastern Orthodox Church
- Feast: 1 March
- Patronage: Germany

Saint Suitbert, Suidbert, Suitbertus, Swithbert, or Swidbert was born in Northumbria, England, in the seventh century, and accompanied Willibrord on the Anglo-Saxon mission.

== Life ==
Suitbert was born in Northumbria. According to legend, his mother saw a star falling before he was born, so he is often depicted with a star. He studied in Ireland, at Rathmelsigi, Leinster, along with Ecgberht of Ripon. The latter, filled with zeal for the conversion of the Germans, had sent Wihtberht to evangelize the Frisians, but owing to the opposition of pagan ruler Redbad, Wihtberht was unsuccessful and returned to England. Ecgberht then sent Willibrord and his twelve companions, including Suitbert.

They landed near the mouth of the Rhine and journeyed to Utrecht, which became their headquarters. The new missionaries worked under the protection of Pepin of Heristal, who, having recently conquered part of Frisia, compelled Redbad to cease harassing the Christians. Suitbert laboured chiefly in North Brabant, Gelderland, and Cleves.

After some years he went back to England, and in 693 was consecrated in Mercia as a missionary bishop by Wilfrid of York. He returned to Frisia and fixed his see at Wijk bij Duurstede on a branch of the Rhine. A little later, entrusting his flock of converts to Willibrord, he proceeded north of the Rhine and the Lippe, among the Bructeri, or Boructuari, in the district of Berg, Westphalia. This mission bore fruit at first, but ended owing to the inroads of the pagan Saxons; the latter had conquered the territory.

About 700 Suitbert withdrew to Werth, a small island that formed an important crossing point of the Rhine, six miles from Düsseldorf. It had been granted to him by Pepin of Heristal, probably at the request of his wife Plectrude. There Suitbert built a Benedictine abbey and ended his days in peace, 1 March 713. Bede described Suitbert as a "man of modest nature and gentle heart". He was succeeded as abbot by Saint Willeic, also born in England.

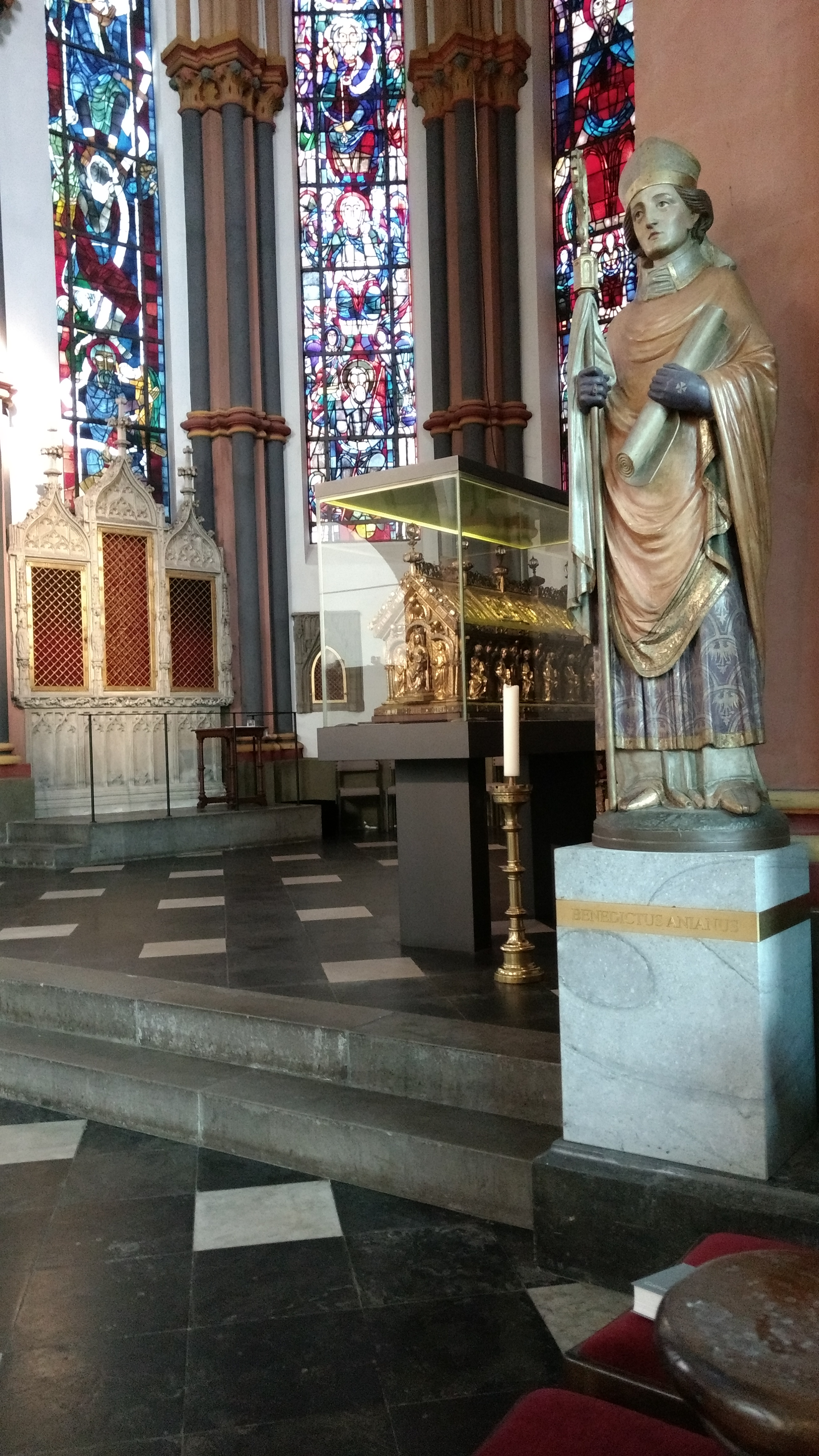
Sankt-Suitbertus, Kaiserswerth

== Veneration ==
His relics were rediscovered in 1626 at Kaiserwerth and are venerated there. Suitbert's bones have rested in a shrine in the former collegiate and current parish church of Kaiserswerth since 1264. The shrine is one of the most important examples of medieval goldsmithing in the Rhine-Maas region. The medieval shrine is no longer used for processions, replaced by a shrine built in 1991. In 2020, the original shrine was scheduled to be sent to Cologne to be restored. Suitbert is considered a patron saint of Germany. His feast day falls on 1 March. He is invoked against sore throats.

Kaiserwerth holds an annual festival weekend each May in celebration of Saint Suitbertus. There is a shrine procession through the old town of Kaiserswerth and along the Rhine. The community festival follows a pontifical mass.

An 1864 sculpture of St. Suitbert by Julius Bayerle rests in a niche on the façade of the listed building on the Suitbertus-Stiftsplatz Nr. 10, Kaiserswerth.
