= Rath Melsigi =

Anglo-Saxon monastery in Ireland

Rath Melsigi was a monastery in Ireland which trained Anglo-Saxon monks. A number of monks who studied there were active in the Anglo-Saxon mission on the continent. The monastery also developed a style of script that may have influenced the writers of the Book of Durrow.

== Overview ==
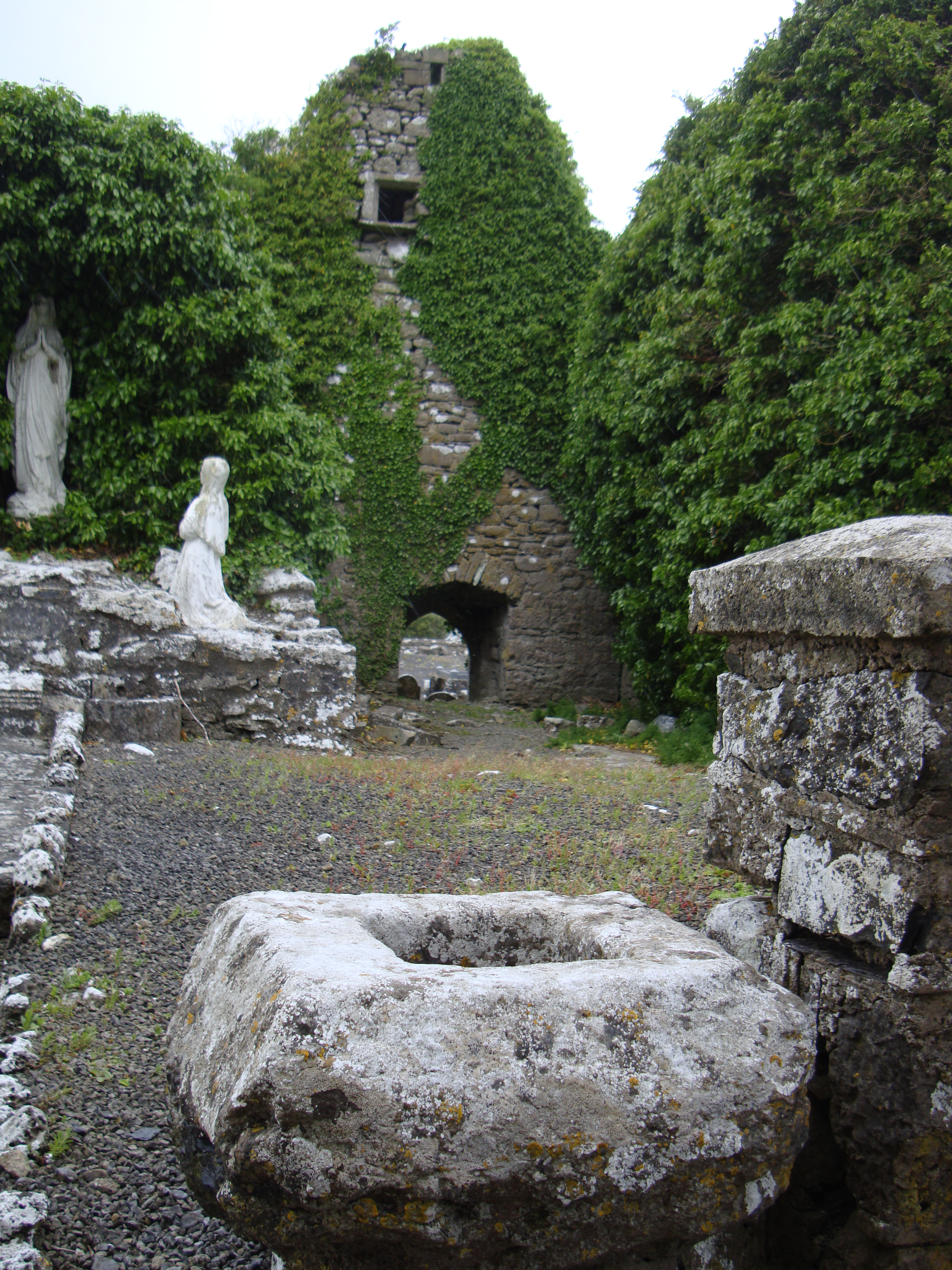
Mayo Abbey

A number of ecclesiastical settlements were established in 7th century Ireland that accommodated European monks, in particular Anglo-Saxon monks. Around 668 Bishop Colman, resigned his see at Lindisfarne, and returned to Ireland. Less than three years later he erected an abbey in County Mayo, exclusively for the English monks in Mayo, subsequently known as Maigh Eo na Saxain ("Mayo of the Saxons").

Other monasteries for Saxon monks include:

- Tullylease (County Cork)
- 'Rigair’ (location uncertain)
- ‘Cluain Mucceda’ location uncertain
- Tech Saxan (Tisaxon, Athenry, County Galway)
- Tech Saxan (Tisaxan, Kinsale, County Cork)

Many Anglo Saxons and Franks were educated at Irish monasteries, such as Mellifont Abbey, including King Alfred of England, Oswald of England & Dagobert II of France. Many of the early Anglo-Saxon manuscripts such as the Lindisfarne Gospels were written in Irish script either directly by Irish monks based in Britain or by Anglo-Saxon monks who were trained by Irish monks.

== History ==
Rath Melsigi was located in what is now the townland of Clonmelsh, County Carlow. Among those known to have studied there were Willibrord, and Swithbert, Adalbert of Egmond, and Chad of Mercia. Others studied at Irish monasteries at Armagh, Kildare, Glendalough, and Clonmacnoise. In the controversy over the keeping of Easter, Rath Melsigi accepted the Roman Easter.

In the plague of 664, Bede tells, the monks of Rath Melsigi were almost all carried off by the disease. One of those taken ill was the twenty-five year old Ecgberht of Ripon. Most of his companions from Northumbria, including Æthelhun, died.

Ecgberht vowed that if he recovered, he would become a peregrinus and lead a life of penitential prayer and fasting. According to Henry Mayr-Harting, Ecgberht was one of the most famous 'pilgrims' of the early Middle Ages, and occupied a prominent position in a political and religious culture that spanned northern Britain and the Irish Sea. Ecgberht would later organise the first missions to Frisia.

Illuminations of the Book of Durrow show the varied origins of the Insular style. These include animal interlace that draw from the Germanic Migration Period Animal Style II, as found in the Anglo-Saxon jewellery at Sutton Hoo. While one hypothesis posits that the book may have been written at Iona, a second suggests that, given similarities to manuscripts at Echternach associated with Willibrord, who spent twelve years at Rath Melsigi, "the script developed at Rath Melsigi was employed in the creation of our manuscript at Durrow, probably in the eighth century."

== See also ==
- Christianity in Anglo-Saxon England
- Anglo-Saxon mission
