= Finan =

Finan may refer to:

- Finan Cam, Abbot of Kinnity, an early Irish saint.
- Finan of Lindisfarne (died 661), second Bishop of Lindisfarne from 651 until 661.

== See also ==
- Finan (surname)
- Finnan (disambiguation)
- Finnian (disambiguation)
