= List of monastic houses in County Kerry =

The smaller establishments such as monastic cells and notable monastic granges (particularly those with resident monks) and camerae of the military orders of monks (Knights Templars and Knights Hospitallers) are included. The numerous monastic hospitals per se are not included here unless at some time the foundation had, or was purported to have, the status or function of an abbey, priory, or preceptory/commandery.

== Layout ==
Communities/provenance: shows the status and communities existing at each establishment, together with such dates as have been established as well as the fate of the establishment after dissolution, and the current status of the site.

Formal name or dedication: shows the formal name of the establishment or the person in whose name the church is dedicated, where known.

Alternative names: some of the establishments have had alternative names over the course of time. In order to assist in text-searching such alternatives in name or spelling have been provided.

== Abbreviations and key ==
The sites listed are ruins or fragmentary remains unless indicated thus:
*	current monastic function
+	current non-monastic ecclesiastic function
^	current non-ecclesiastic function
=	remains incorporated into later structure
#	no identifiable trace of the monastic foundation remains
~	exact site of monastic foundation unknown
ø	possibly no such monastic foundation at location
¤	no such monastic foundation
≈	identification ambiguous or confused

Locations with names in italics indicate probable duplication (misidentification with another location) or non-existent foundations (either erroneous reference or proposed foundation never implemented).

Trusteeship denoted as follows:
NIEA	Scheduled Monument (NI)
NM	National Monument (ROI)
C.I.	Church of Ireland
R.C.	Roman Catholic Church

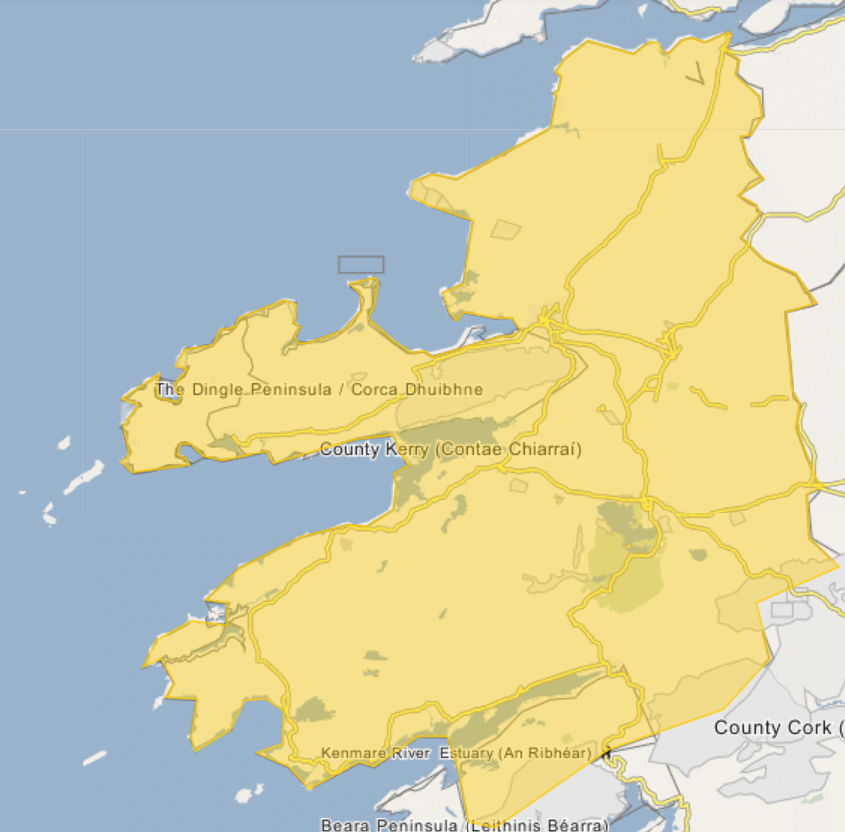
Locations of monastic houses in County Kerry

Foundation	Image	Communities & provenance	Formal name or dedication & alternative names	References & location
Abbeydorney Abbey		Cistercian monks — from Monasteranenagh daughter house of Monasteranenagh; founded 1154 founder unknown - erroneously given as a Fitzmaurice; daughter house of Mellifont; daughter house of Monasteranenagh restored; dissolved 1537 (though last abbot active until 1577) site now in use as a graveyard	Odorney; Kyrie Eleison; Monaster-O-d'Torna	52°21′12″N 9°41′15″W
Aghadoe Monastery		?Augustinian Canons Regular purportedly founded 7th century by St Finan Lobhar; extant 992; non-monastic church of the Holy Trinity and St Mary built on site 1158; damaged by gales 1282; erenaghs up to 1450 (NM)	Achad-da-eo; Aithedea	52°04′36″N 9°33′16″W
Alltraige-caille Monastery ^{~}		early monastic site, founded 6th century		location unknown - possibly nr Tralee
Ardfert Friary		Franciscan Friars Minor, Conventual founded c.1253 by Thomas Fitzmaurice Fitzraymond, Lord of Kerry, purportedly buried here; Observant Franciscan Friars refounded 1517; dissolved 1584, friars expelled, some remained in the area;(NM)	Ard-ferta-brenainn; Hertfert; Hyferte; Ifert	52°19′48″N 9°46′26″W
Ardfert Dominican Friary ^{≈}	Dominican Friars — erroneous reference to the Franciscan Friary (see immediately above)			
Ardfert Cathedral Monastery		early monastic site, founded 6th century by St Brendan of Clonfert; episcopal diocesan cathedral founded after 1111, translated from Ratass		52°19′44″N 9°46′54″W
Ballinskelligs Priory		early monastic site founded 11th century?; Augustinian Canons Regular — Arroasian founded c.1210?; dissolved after 1555; granted to John Blake 1585; (NM)	Ballin-skelligs; St Michael de Rupe; St Michael's Mount	51°48′56″N 10°16′19″W
Bentee Mount Monastery		early monastic site, Anchorites		51°56′00″N 10°12′58″W (approx)
Brandon Mountain Monastery		early monastic site, Anchorites, purportedly founded by St Brendan of Clonfert; possibly continuing after 1111		52°14′55″N 10°12′04″W (approx)
Caherbarbagh Monastery		early monastic site, Anchorites		51°51′25″N 10°07′46″W (approx)
Carrig Island Monastery, ^{ø} Arghavallen parish		possible early monastic site, "Abbey (in ruins)" (Note: Ordnance Survey)		52°34′33″N 9°30′02″W
Church Island Monastery, Valentia Harbour; Lough Kay			Cherich-inis?; Lough Kay	51°56′15″N 10°17′00″W
Church Island Monastery, Lough Currane		early monastic site, Anchorites; founded by Finan Cam	Lough Curane	51°50′05″N 10°07′45″W
Derrynane Abbey		early monastic site, Gaelic monks founded 7th century by the monks of St Bairre or by St Finan Cam	Achad-mor; Abbey Island; Darrynane; Ahamore; Aghamore	51°45′27″N 10°08′34″W
Dingle Cell		Augustinian Canons Regular cell, dependent on Killagha — probably not conventual, possibly a vicarage; founded after 1216; dissolved before 1428	Daingean-ui-chuis; Dingle-i-cuche	
Dingle Friary		Dominican Friars possible vicarage and land owned by the Black Friars	Daingean-ui-chuis; Dingle-i-cuche	
Feaghman West Monastery		early monastic site, Anchorites		51°54′54″N 10°20′53″W
Gallarus Monastery		early monastic site, Anchorites	Gall-ros	52°10′22″N 10°20′58″W
Illaunloughan		early monastic site, stone oratories		51°53′12″N 10°22′24″W
Illauntannig Monastic Site, Maghree Islands		early monastic site, Gaelic monks; founded 6th century by St Seanach		52°19′34″N 10°01′12″W
Innisfallen Abbey, Innisfallen Island		early monastic site, founded 7th century by Faithlann, son of Aedh damhan, King of Iar-muman (or Finan Lobhair, or Finan Camm; Augustinian Canons Regular founded after 1197?; dissolved 1589? — probably abandoned by 1589; granted to Robert Collam; granted to Valentine Brown; Augustinian Friars (NM)	St Mary ____________________; Inis-faithlen; Inys-fachlyn	52°02′48″N 9°33′15″W
Inishtooskert Monastery		early monastic site, Anchorites	St Brendan	52°07′39″N 10°34′48″W
Inishvickillane Monastery		early monastic site, Anchorites	St Brendan ____________________; Inis-mic-cilleain	52°02′37″N 10°36′27″W
Keeldarragh Monastery		early monastic site, Anchorites		51°52′38″N 10°09′31″W
Kerry Preceptory, ^{~} Tralee?		Knights Hospitaller founded before 1212; dissolution unknown		
Kilcolman Abbey, Milltown		early monastic site	Killagh; Killaha	52°08′59″N 9°43′50″W
Kildreelig Monastery		early monastic site, Anchorites		51°47′48″N 10°18′39″W
Kildreenagh Monastery in Loher		early monastic site, Anchorites		51°46′55″N 10°09′56″W (approx)
Kildrenagh Monastery in Valencia		early monastic site, Anchorites		51°54′27″N 10°22′34″W (approx)
Killabuonia Monastery		early monastic site, Anchorites founded 6th century by Buonia (Beoanigh)		51°50′53″N 10°19′55″W
Killagha Abbey, Milltown		early monastic site, Gaelic monks founded 6th century by Abban (Alban); probably dissolved for some time prior to the Augustinian foundation; Augustinian Canons Regular founded c.1216 by Geoffrey de Marusci (during the reign of King John); dissolved 1576; granted to Thomas Clinton and subsequently to Thomas Spring	St Mary de Bello Loco ____________________; Cell-achaid-conchinn; Kill-agha; Kill-egue; Kilcolman; Killahensis in Munster (under Augustinian Friars)	52°08′58″N 9°43′49″W
Killarney Franciscan Friary *		Franciscan Friars transferred from Gorey 1860; church opened 1867; friary opened 1879; became the Novitiate House of the Irish Province for a time; extant		
Killemlagh Monastery ^{~}		early monastic site, founded by St Finan the Leper, or chapel by St Finan Cam		
Killiney Monastery		possible early monastic site; St Saviour's C.I. parish church built on site		52°14′56″N 10°02′20″W
Killobarnaun Monastery		early monastic site, Anchorites	Killavarnaun	51°57′12″N 10°13′33″W
Killoe Monastery		early monastic site, Anchorites		51°54′16″N 10°10′17″W (approx)
Killogrone Monastery		early monastic site, Anchorites		51°55′07″N 10°10′45″W
Kilmalkedar Monastery		early monastic site, probably continuing after 1111	Cell-maeilchetair	52°11′05″N 10°20′11″W
Kilrellig Monastery, Bolus Head				51°47′48″N 10°18′39″W
Kilpeacon Monastery		early monastic site, Anchorites	Kilpeacan	51°53′44″N 10°13′17″W (approx)
Lislaughtin Abbey		Observant Franciscan Friars founded 1470-7 by John O'Connor, Lord of Iraghticonnor, who had requested permission from the Pope in 1477; dissolved 1580, destroyed by the Protestants; rebuilt 1629; granted to James Scrolls; granted to Sir Edward Denny (NM)	Leasa-lauchtin; Lislachtin; Hilleanbegha	52°33′26″N 9°28′12″W
Lisselton Friary ^{≈}	erroneous reference to Franciscan Friars — mistaken identification of Lislaughtin			
Muckross Abbey		Observant Franciscan Friars founded 1440-8 by Donal, son of Thady MacCarthy, possibly on the site of an earlier monastery; restored by Donal, son of Thady MacCarthy 1468; dissolved 1586-9, purportedly leased out 1587; granted to Robert Collan 1595; reoccupied 1612; old buildings restored after 1617	The Holy Trinity ____________________; Carraig-na-chiuil; Irrelagh; Irialach; Monaster-Airbhealaigh; Oirbhealach	52°01′34″N 9°29′41″W
Oriel Monastery		early monastic site	Monaster-ni-Oriel; Abbey Oriel	51°53′59″N 9°28′26″W
Rathmore		Cistercian monks founded 1861; temporary refuge for monks evicted from Melleray, France		
Ratass Cathedral Monastery		early monastic site, founded 6th century; probably continuing after 1111; episcopal diocesan cathedral founded 1111, church elevated to cathedral status by the Synod of Rathbreasail; translated to Ardfert before 1117	Raith-maige-deiscirt; Rathass	52°16′01″N 9°40′55″W
Rattoo Monastery, nr Ballyduff		early monastic site - founded 6th century by Bishop Lugaid/Lugach	Rath-muighe-tuaiscirt - "fort/rath of the northern plain".	52°26′33″N 9°38′59″W
Rattoo Abbey, nr Ballyduff		possibly Fratres Cruciferi or Knights Hospitaller hospital founded c.1200 by Brother William; ?Augustinian Canons Regular — Arroasian founded before 1207; dissolved 1542, officially suppressed, convent possibly continued until c.1581; fortified by the Irish, who destroyed it to prevent it falling to the forces of Sir Charles Willmott; (NM)	The Hospital of Saint John the Baptist; The Priory Church of Saint Peter and Saint Paul ____________________; Ballyduff Abbey	br />52°26′35″N 9°38′46″W
Riasc Monastery		early monastic site, Anchorites founded 6th century; probably continuing after 1111	Reask	52°10′03″N 10°23′16″W
St Manchan's Monastery		early monastic site, Anchorites founded by St Manchan	Teampall Geal	52°08′38″N 10°21′31″W
Scarriff Monastery		early monastic site, Anchorites	Sgairbh	51°43′38″N 10°15′21″W (approx)
Skellig Michael Monastery, Great Skellig Island		early monastic site, purportedly founded by a St Finan; plundered by the Danes 824; rebuilt 860; most of the community transferred to Ballinaskellig probably before mid-11th century, hermits probably remaining into the medieval period	Great Skellig; Raith-maigi-tuaiscirt; Rath-maigi-tuaiscirt; Rath-maigi-tuaidh; Rath-maigi-tuoindhi; Rath-maigi-tuoinoyd; Rath-maigi-toy; Rath-maigi-ytue; Doraythoyg; Rahtuahc; Raythnayt	51°46′20″N 10°32′19″W
Temple Cashel Monastery		early monastic site, Gaelic nuns		51°50′52″N 10°22′03″W
Termons Monastery		early monastic site		51°50′59″N 10°10′13″W
Tralee Holy Cross Priory		Dominican Friars founded 1243 by Lord John FitzThomas FitzGerald (John of Callan), buried here; dissolved 1580	The Dominican Church of Holy Cross Abbey; The Priory of the Holy Cross, Tralee	52°16′05″N 9°42′35″W

The following location in County Kerry lacks monastic connection:

- Ardfert Abbey: Georgian mansion, home of the Crosbie family, destroyed by IRA bomb 1922

== Map link to lists of monastic houses in Ireland by county ==
Click on a county to go to the corresponding article.	Antrim; Armagh; Down; Fermanagh; Londonderry; Tyrone; Carlow; Cavan; Clare; Cork; Donegal; Dublin; Galway; Kerry; Kildare; Kilkenny; Laois; Leitrim; Limerick; Longford; Louth; Mayo; Meath; Monaghan; Offaly; Roscommon; Sligo; Tipperary; Waterford; Westmeath; Wexford; Wicklow

== See also ==
- List of monastic houses in Ireland
