= Mayo Abbey =

Mayo Abbey may refer to:

- Monastery of Mayo, a medieval abbey
- Mayo, County Mayo, village also known as Mayo Abbey
