= Gerald of Mayo =

Northumbrian monk and saint

Gerald of Mayo (died 13 March 732 AD) is a saint of the Roman Catholic Church and Eastern Orthodox Church.

== Biography ==
Gerald was born in Northumbria. Little reliable information is known of his early life, and his date of birth is unknown. Gerald is said to be the son of an Anglo-Saxon king, Cusperius, and the queen Benitia. According to the stories of the Life of Saint Gerald, the king sent Gerald and his brothers Balanus, Berikertus, and Hubritanus to be educated by the Irish bishop Colmán of Lindisfarne.

Gerald later became one of the English monks at Lindisfarne who accompanied Colmán to Iona and then to Ireland. This occurred after the Synod of Whitby in 664 AD. The Northumbrian King Oswy ruled in favour of the Easter date then current in the rest of the Catholic Church, which meant he ruled against the Irish method of calculating the date for Easter. Though Colmán was an ardent supporter of the Irish traditions, he decided after the synod to go along with the Alexandrian computus, which by that time had become essentially universal in 9th century western christianity.

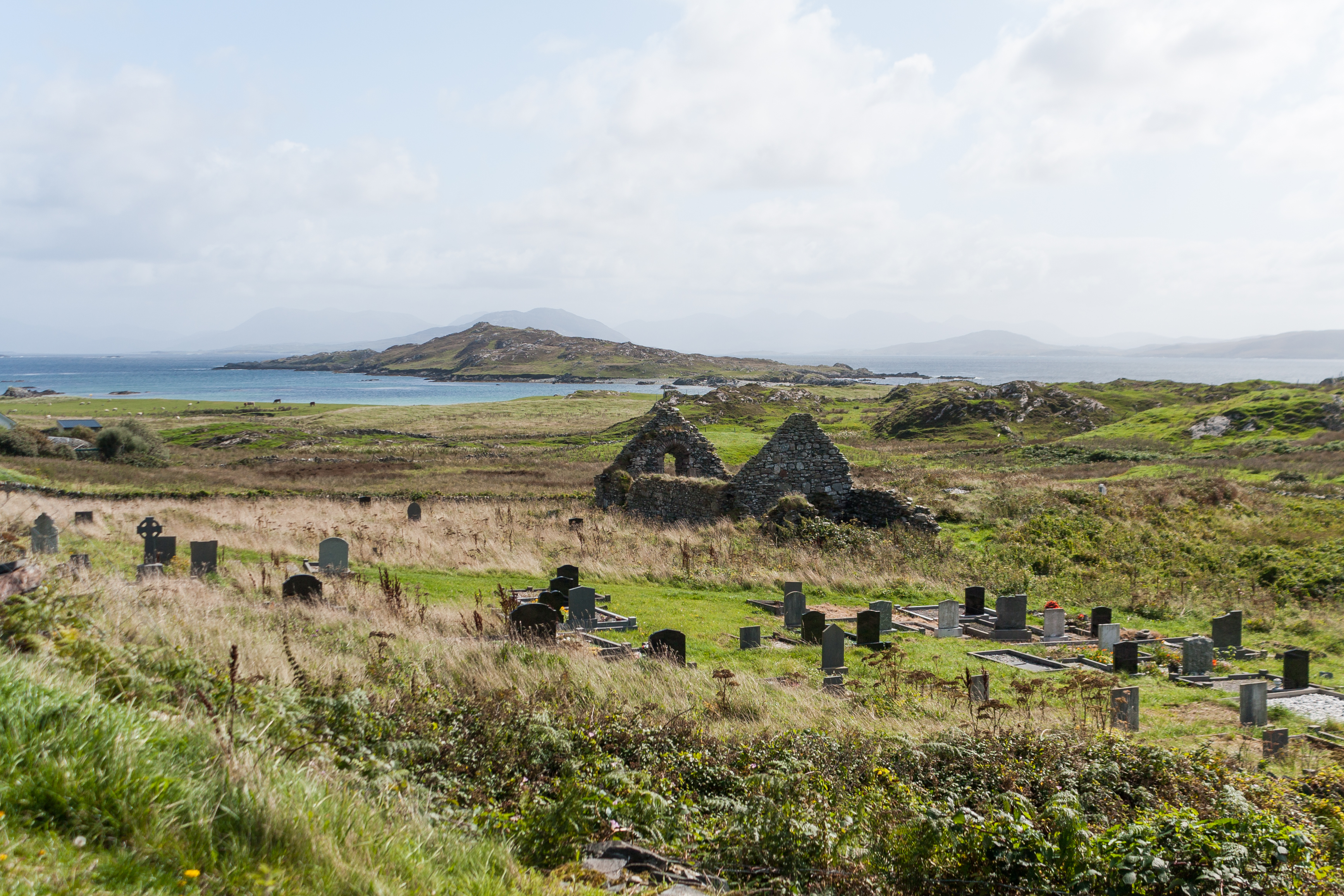
Old St. Colmán's Church, Inishbofin

Gerald was among thirty Northumbrian monks who left Lindisfarne with Colmán and eventually settled in 668 on Inishbofin [island of the white cow] in what is now Galway, 8 km off the coast of Connemara in Connacht. Angles of Northumbria would have originally been influenced by teachers of Irish descent. The newcomers would have therefore experienced at first hand Irish teachings and a monastic life to which they had been formed in Lindisfarne.

=== Upset at Inishbofin ===
Dissensions arose, almost immediately, between the Irish and the Northumbrian monks. The Northumbrian contingent were disgruntled by the others leaving Inishbofin for the summer to preach around the mainland, while they were left to tend to the island. This falling-out, it has been suggested, might simply have arisen from a difference between Northumbrian and Irish agricultural traditions, the latter incorporating Transhumance. Vera Orschel indicates that the community might have had a mainland base for cattle, from which transhumance could have enticed drovers among the Irish monks to have absconded in the summer months. However, transhumance would not have been a practice foreign to the Northumbrians. Furthermore, it seems the break between the two groups might have occurred as early as the first year after they all arrived at Inishbofin.

Perhaps a clue to the split might be that the Irish of the middle ages did indeed have a reputation for simply ‘wandering’. It was not uncommon for monks to stray from their houses in search of scholarship or missionary fields. Indeed, a 7th century Irish canon begs clergy to teach, as a priority, people of one’s own country. Apparently Irish monks often returned to their home village to preach. Arrived at Inishbofin, the Irish brethren were now closer to home and physically able to return for worthwhile intervals. In contrast, the Northumbrians would have had to content themselves with abiding by the rule of St Basil of Caesarea that agriculture was the best kind of work for monks, in that it kept them from wandering.

=== Mayo of the Saxons ===
After such early upset, Colmán decided to found a separate monastery for the thirty Northumbrian brethren, setting up Gerald as the first abbot. Colmán died soon after. Thus arose, in 670, the "Mayo of the Saxons" (Note: People from the middle and eastern half of Britain, speaking a Germanic tongue, were described in Ireland as ‘Saxons' from the eighth century.) (Magh Eo, the yew plain), 74 km away from Inishbofin. Gerald was fairly young to hold such a prominent position but led wisely.

The monastery flourished and became a popular destination. To judge merely from the size of its enclosure (traces still discernable at Mayo Abbey of diameter 400 metres), the monastery at some time in its early history must have been comparable in influence and relevance with sites like Armagh, Kildare, Glendalough, and Clonmacnoise. Mayo seems to have been considered amongst the larger monasteries in the Irish annals of the time. Under its youthful abbott, the School of Mayo gained greatly in fame for sanctity and learning. It was sufficiently on the map for Alcuin in York and Aachen to have corresponded with its abbott and monks. Emanating from Mayo as far as England and France was a ‘great light of knowledge’, according to Alcuin. This suggests Mayo had developed a reputation as a monastic or cathedral school. The economic base appears to have been present to have permitted development of a good scriptorium and library.

Gerald remained abbott at Mayo until 697, when, some say, he resigned in favour of Saint Adomnán. Adomnán, some authors hold, celebrated Easter at Mayo in 703, but afterwards left for Skreen, in Hy Fiachrach, 78 km away. Without their abbott, the monks prevailed on Gerald to resume the abbacy. Gerald continued to govern the Abbey and Diocese of Mayo until his death at an advanced age.

=== Further works ===
Gerald is reputed to have founded the abbeys of Tempul-Gerald (or Ely-Theria) in Connaught and Teagh-na-Saxon, and a convent.

The Life of Saint Gerald tells how Gerald and others were involved with the course of events during a large plague in the 660s that ended up killing half of Ireland's population. Saint Gerald and Saint Fechin were invited to a meeting by the joint kings in Tara to determine what to do about the plague and a concurrent famine. Fechin believed the plague was sent by God to stop people from continuing to starve, while Gerald advocated to pray for an end to the plague and the problems of starvation. Gerald's sister and many from her convent reportedly died during the plague.

In one fairly uncommon miracle, Gerald is credited with a resurrection that transformed the subject's gender. As told in the Life of Saint Gerald, a king's only child, a daughter, died, and the king was both distraught and desperate to have a male heir. The king asks Gerald to save his child, but tells the saint that his son has died, and asks Gerald to rescue him. Gerald suspects the real story, but the king persists in lying, and Gerald says the child can be brought back as a boy, no matter his original gender. Gerald brings the boy to life, and the king is overjoyed, naming his son Catholus. This is a more complex version of a similar gender-changing miracle attributed to Saint Abbán.

=== Family and death ===
Though there has been mention of Gerald's having had a sister, and a brother (supposedly Balin, also a disciple of Colmán, and residing in Connaught), the historic reliability of these accounts has been questioned. Likewise, Beretchert and Huildbriti are also Irish saints, which seems too unlikely to modern scholars. They are likely "siblings in spirit" rather than by family.

Colgan thinks Gerald did not live after 697; but the Annals of the Four Masters give the date of his death as 13 March 726, while the "Annals of Ulster" date his death to as late as 731.

== Legacy ==
St Gerald's College, Castlebar is named after Gerald. Taoiseach Enda Kenny is an alumnus.

Various churches and schools honour this saint, e.g. in North York, Ontario; Oak Lawn, Illinois; Farmington, Michigan; and in Ralston, New England.

== Sources ==
There are several sources for the life and legend of Saint Gerald, with some more reliable than others.

Many of the documentary sources on Gerald come from The Life of Saint Gerald, but this is also viewed today as an unreliable source, with some blatant anachronisms. This source was shared by Colgan on Gerald's festival day, March 13, many centuries after his death, and likely compiled by the scribe Augustin Magraidin.

The Annals of Ulster provide more evidence of Gerald's involvement with Mayo of the Saxons.

The Annals of the Four Masters provide further, sometimes conflicting, dates for some events.
