= Anmchad =

Anmchad (or Amchad) (died 1058) was an 11th-century Irish monk. Little is known about him, except that the Annals of Inisfallen mention that he was known as the "anchorite of God" and was buried on the island of Church Island (Lough Currane) (also known as Inis Uasail, which means "Upper" or "Noble" Island) on Lough Currane in 1058. He was from Longford, and served as a monk in the Inis Cealtra monastery, located in Lough Ree. In 1043 AD, after being ordered to undergo a pilgrimage for a small disobedience, he became a monk at an Irish monastery in Fulda, Germany.

== See also ==
- Finan of Lindisfarne
