= Saint Finan =

Saint Finan may refer to:

- Finan of Lindisfarne (died 661), second Bishop of Lindisfarne from 651 until 661
- Finan Cam (or Fionan, Finian), Abbot of Kinnity, an early Irish saint
