= Finnian =

Finnian (also Finian, Fionán or Fionnán in Irish; or Finianus and Finanus in its Latinised form) may refer to:

- Finnian of Movilla (495–589), Christian missionary to Ireland
- Finnian of Clonard (470–549), Irish founder of the monastery of Clonard
- Finian Lobhar an early Irish saint credited with founding a church and monastery at Innisfallen in Killarney.

== See also ==
- Finnan (disambiguation)
- Finan of Lindisfarne
