= Monastery of Mayo =

Irish Catholic monastery

The School of Mayo was an early Catholic monastery in Mayo, Ireland, founded by Saint Colmán of Lindisfarne, c. 668. It became famous for sanctity and learning, but suffered from raids of natives and foreigners, especially during the 14th century.

== History ==
The School of Mayo was situated in Mayo, almost equidistant from the towns of Claremorris and Castlebar. The founder, St. Colmán, who lived in the middle of the seventh century, was in all probability a native of the West of Ireland. He did his ecclesiastical studies at Iona, during the abbacy of the renowned Ségéne mac Fiachnaí. After the death of Finan, the second Bishop of Lindisfarne, Colman was appointed to succeed him.

Colmán's episcopate was much disturbed by a fierce renewal of the Easter controversy. He vigorously advocated the old Irish custom, and cited the example of his predecessors, but all to no avail. At a synod specially summoned at Whitby in 664, the Alexandrian computus prevailed. Colmán, unwilling to abandon the practice of the "holy elders of the Irish Church", resolved to quit Lindisfarne.

In 668 he crossed the seas to his native land again, and on a remote island off Ireland's western coast called Inishbofin, he built a monastery and school. This much is clearly set out in the Historia ecclesiastica gentis Anglorum of Bede, who then proceeds to describe how this led to the founding of the great school of Mayo. "Colman, the Irish Bishop", writes Bede, "departed from Britain and took with him all the Irish that he had assembled in the Island of Lindisfarne, and also about thirty of the English nation who had been instructed in the monastic life.... Afterwards he retired to a small island which is to the west of Ireland, and at some distance from the coast, called in the language of the Irish, Inishbofinde [island of the white cow]. Arriving there he built a monastery, and placed in it the monks he brought with him of both nations".

It appears, however, the Irish and English monks could not agree. Colmán sought to put an end to their dissensions, and travelling about he eventually found a place on the mainland fit to build a monastery at Maigh Eó (The Plain of the Yew Trees), translating into English as Mayo. This monastery became an important and flourishing institution, and even an episcopal see.

Colmán took a deep and practical interest in his new foundation at Mayo, which came to be called "Mayo of the Saxons". In the year 670, with his consent, its first canonical abbot was appointed. This was Gerald, the son of a northern English king, who, annoyed at the way Colmán's most cherished convictions had been slighted at Whitby, had resolved to follow him to Ireland. The school gained greatly in fame for sanctity and learning under this youthful abbot.

In about 679 Adamnan, the illustrious biographer of Columba, visited Mayo and according to some writers, ruled there for seven years after Gerald's death. This latter statement is not, on the face of it, improbable if Gerald, as Colgan thinks, did not live after 697; but the Four Masters give the date of his death as 13 March 726, and the "Annals of Ulster" put the event as late as 731.

With regard to events after Gerald's death there are recorded only isolated facts concerning the school he had ruled so wisely and had loved so well. Nonetheless, such isolated details have often attracted considerable interest, or acquired importance. The monastery burned down after a lightning strike in 783, Fire again destroyed it in 808. The old "Life of St. Gerald" states that the monastery was plundered in 818 by Turgesius the Dane. Buried here was Domhnall, son of Torlough O'Conor, Lord of North Connacht, "the glory and the moderator and the good adviser of the Irish people" (d. 1176). From the entry of 1209, recording the death of "Cele O'Duffy, Bishop of Magh Eo of the Saxons", it was long after the Synod of Kells (1152) that the monastery acquired the status of an episcopal see.

Mayo, like the other ancient Irish monastic schools, suffered from the raids of native and foreigner, especially during the fourteenth century. But it survived them all: as late as 1478, a bishop's death was still being qualified as "Bishop Higgens of Mayo of the Saxons". It cannot be ascertained when the diocese of Mayo, featuring not a cathedral but a parochial church, outlived its status for practical purposes. However, as late as 1217, during the reign of Honorius III, the Roman Curia had to discuss the question. It was probably not settled definitively for centuries after that: one of those martyred at Kilmallock on 13 August 1579 was Patrick O'Hely, "Bishop of Mayo of the Saxons". The diocese was formally joined to Tuam by papal decree as late as 1631.

There is today little indication in Mayo Abbey village of its former heritage or importance in the Celtic-Anglo Saxon Christian world of the 7th and 8th centuries. This place remained, for more than a thousand years, one of the most important centres in the region, becoming in turn a diocese and a Norman town. It gave its name to County Mayo, the third largest county in Ireland.
