= Paddy Curran =

Irish Gaelic footballer

Personal information
- Born: County Kerry

Sport
- Sport: Gaelic football
- Position: Forward
Club
- Years: Club
- 200?-present: Watervile
Inter-county
- Years: County
- Kerry

Paddy Curran (born 1988 in Waterville, County Kerry is an Irish sportsperson. He plays Gaelic football with his local club Waterville, his divisional side South Kerry and has been a member of the Kerry inter-county teams at all levels. He has also played with Bishopstown.

At intercounty level he played with the Kerry minor team for 3 years 2004–06. He won Munster Championship titles in 2004 and 2006 as captain, he also played in All Ireland finals in both years but lost both to Tyrone in 2004 and Roscommon in 2006. He then moved on to the Under 21 team where he won Munster and All Ireland titles in 2008. In 2008 he also won a Munster Junior title.
