= Church Island (Lough Currane) =

Medieval monastery in Lough Currane, Ireland

- Inis Úasal
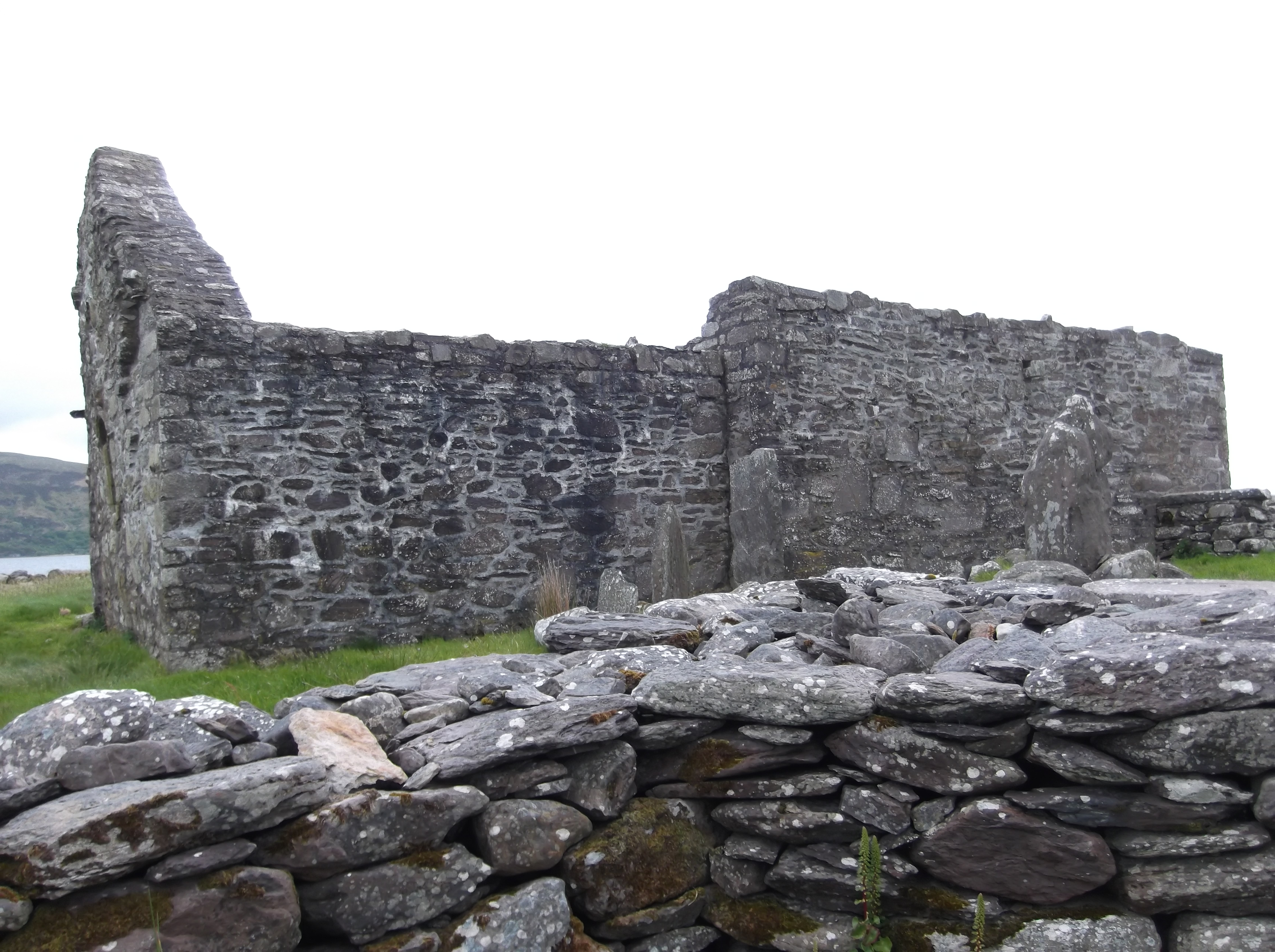

- Location within Ireland
- Interactive map of Church Island

Monastery information
- Established: 7th century AD
- Diocese: Kerry

People
- Founder: Finan Cam

Architecture
- Status: ruined
- Style: Romanesque

Site
- Location: Lough Currane, County Kerry
- Coordinates: 51.834893°N 10.129270°W
- Public access: yes

Church Island (Irish: Inis Úasal), is a small island in Lough Currane, County Kerry, Ireland. It is the site of an early medieval monastery established by St. Fínán in the seventh century. Another name for Inis Uasal ("Noble Island') is Inis na bFer Náemh ('Island of Holy Men'). Because St Finan was a very important Irish saint of medieval County Kerry, this church was considered to be the earliest church of the kingdom. A Romanesque-style church, constructed in stone in the 12th century, replaced an earlier wooden church on the island. The ruins of the church are surrounded by a graveyard with decorative slabs and three leachta (cairns). The site is a National Monument in state care.

== Description ==
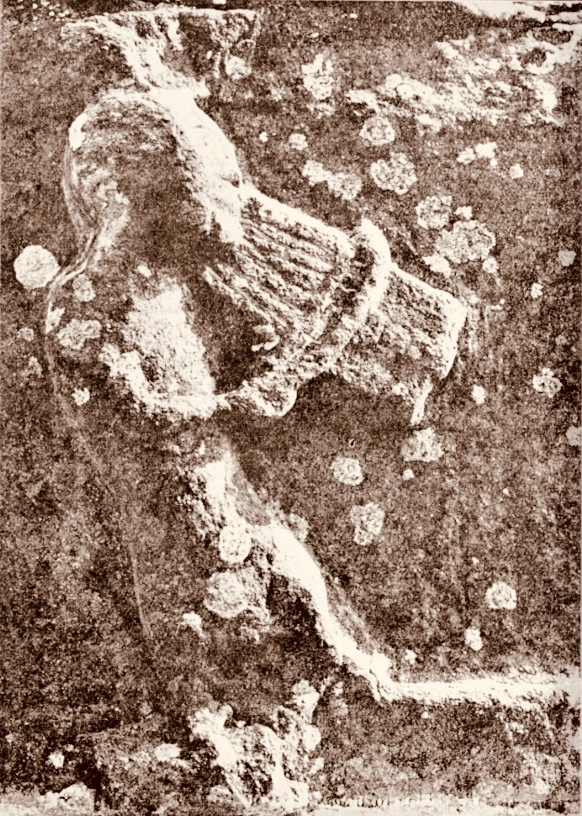
Relief carving depicting a musician playing a bowed lyre

Church Island is located on a 1.8 ha (4.4 acres) island in Lough Currane, in County Kerry, Ireland, 2.8 km (1.7 mi) east of Waterville. The island is located at the east end of the lake. The lake was at one time called Loch Luighdeach. The island was formerly called Inis Uasal, ('Noble Island') or Inis na bFer Náemh ('Island of Holy Men').

What remains today are church ruins, a graveyard with stone slabs, and three leachta (burial mounds). There are 11 cross slabs on the island; two slabs feature inscriptions. One of the slabs has an inscription in Irish, along with alpha and omega Greek symbols, with a blessing on the monk Anmchad, who is supposedly buried on the island. Of the three leachta in the cemetery, two feature tall pillar stones at the center, while the third is a low mound built from stone slabs. The church contains a rectangular block of sandstone with a 12th century engraving of a musician playing a bowed lyre. The site is a National Monument in state care.

== History ==
Inis Úasal was considered to be an important ecclesiastical site in County Kerry during the period, 800–1100 AD. Documentary evidence indicates that it was a monastery founded by St Finán in the early seventh century. Because Finán was considered to be a "chief saint" in County Kerry, this church is seen as the medieval kingdom's earliest church. The monastic settlement originally included a wooden church and beehive cells for sleeping. St Finán is believed to have been buried on the island under one of the leachtai (cairns). St Finian also founded the monastery on Skellig Michael, sometime between the 6th and 8th centuries. Bells dated to the Early Christian era and a bronze staff have been discovered near Lough Currane. They have since been lost. The current Romanesque-style stone church dates to the third quarter of the 12th century.

There are eleven large recumbent 11th to 12th-century grave-slabs on the island, the only group of its kind in County Kerry. This burial site was likely used for clergy and their patrons.

== Gallery ==
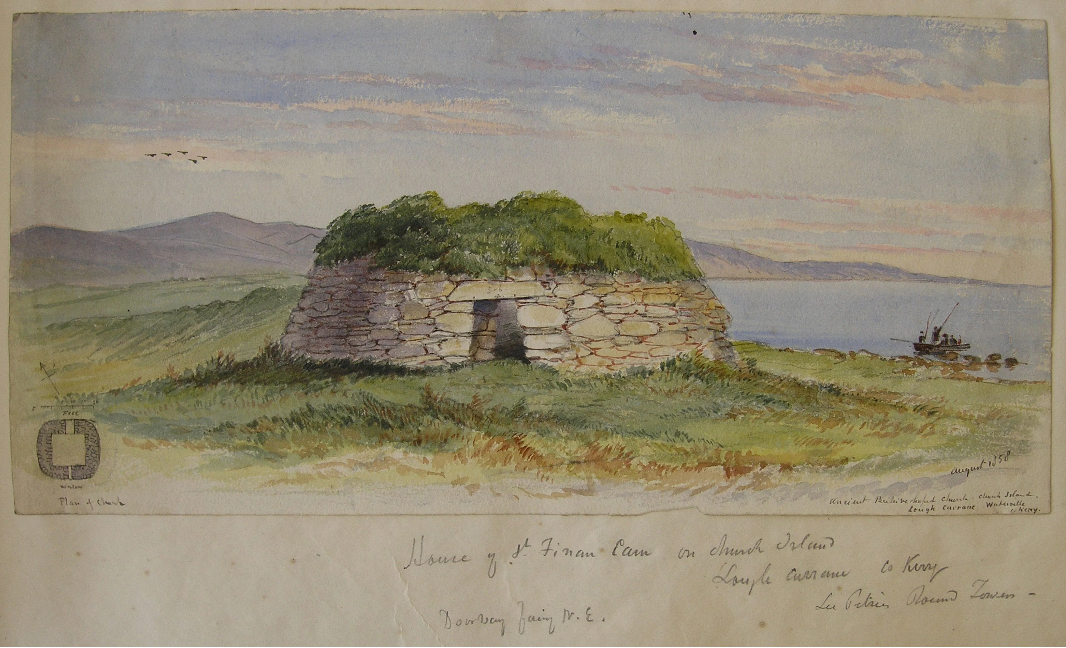
1858 painting, Church Island

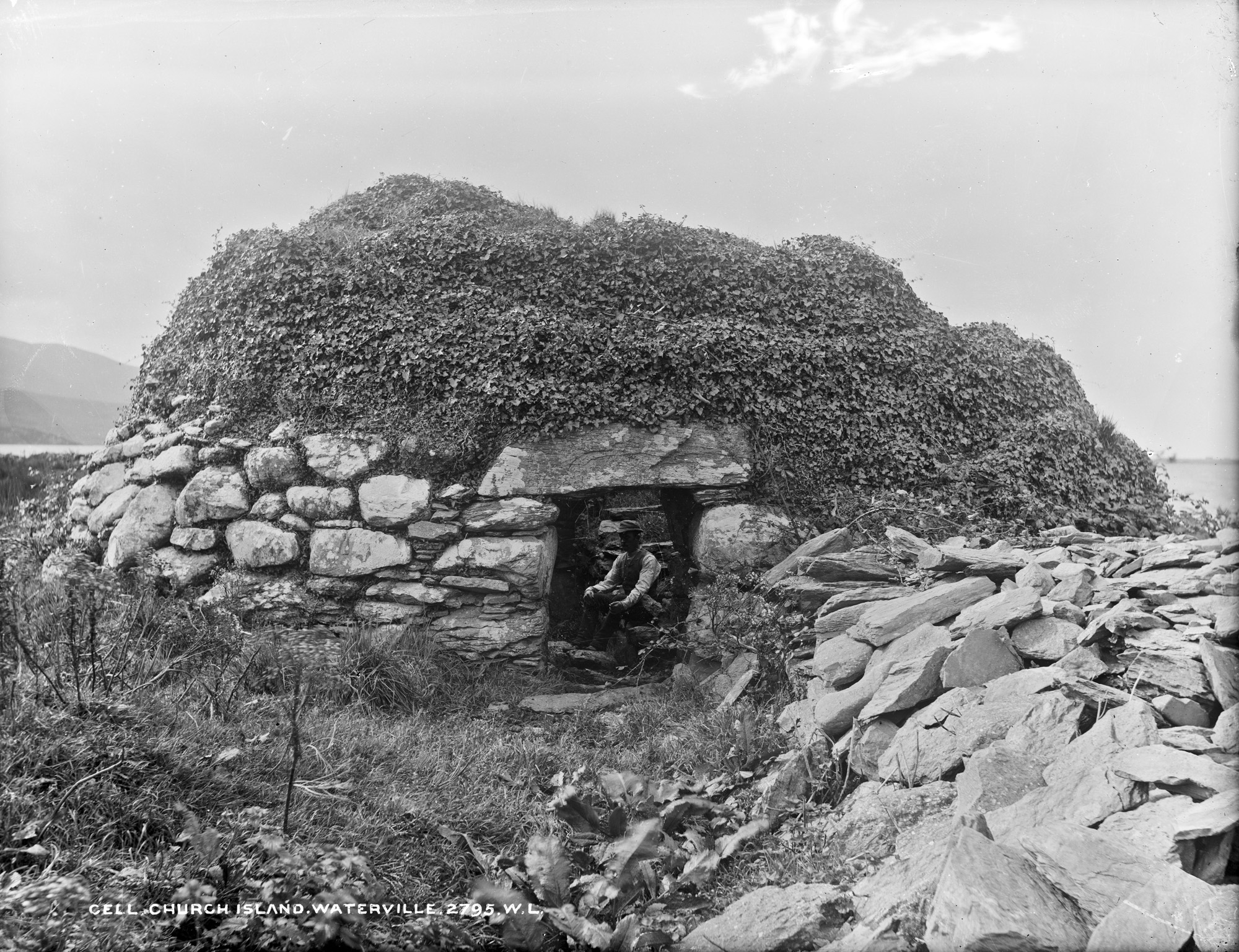
St. Finian's's cell, 1865

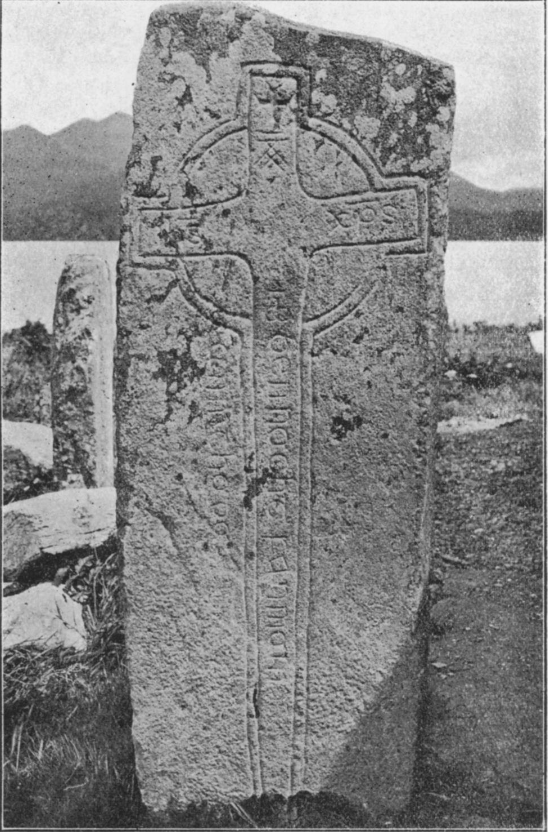
Cross-engraved stone, 1908

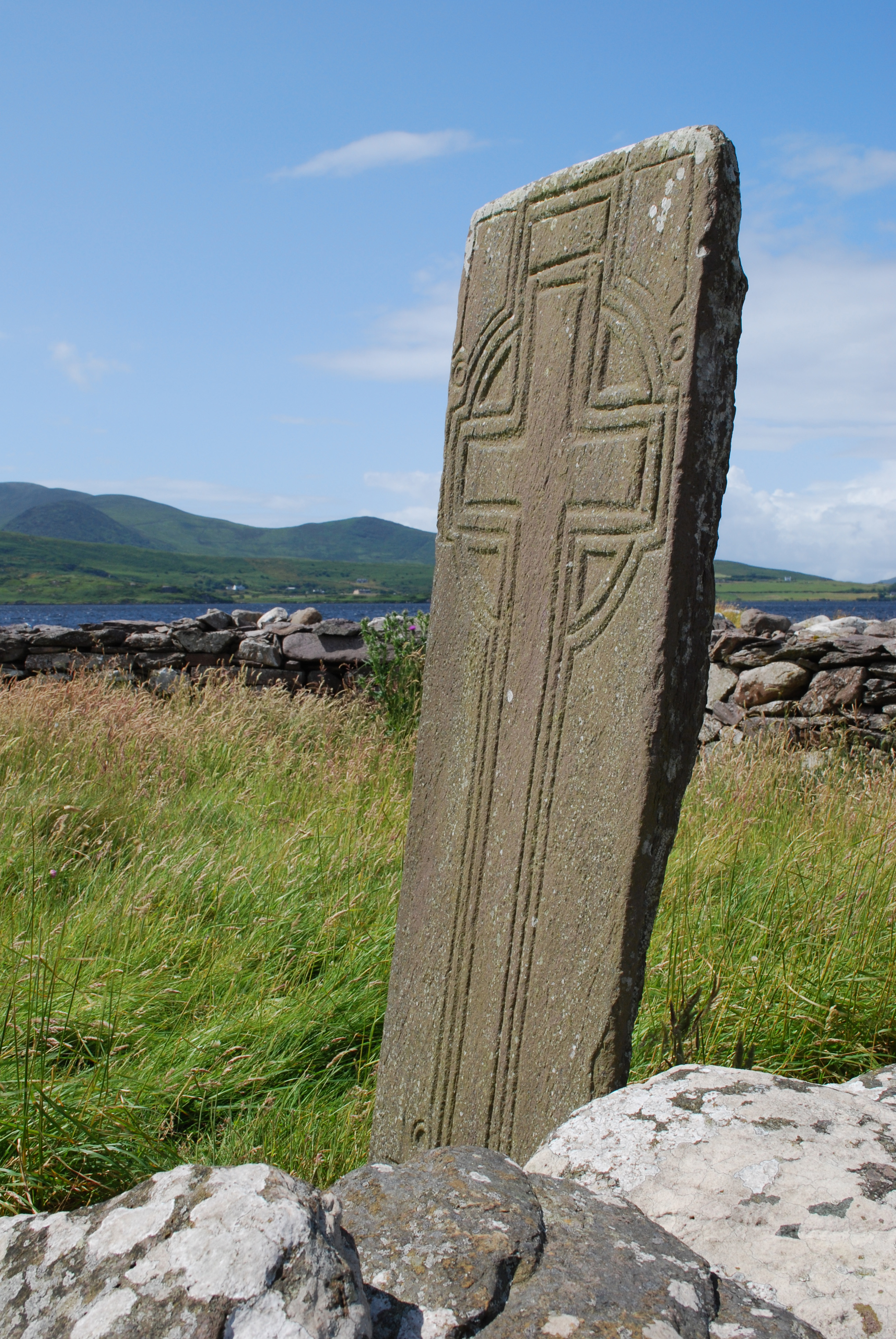
Cross-engraved stone, 2009

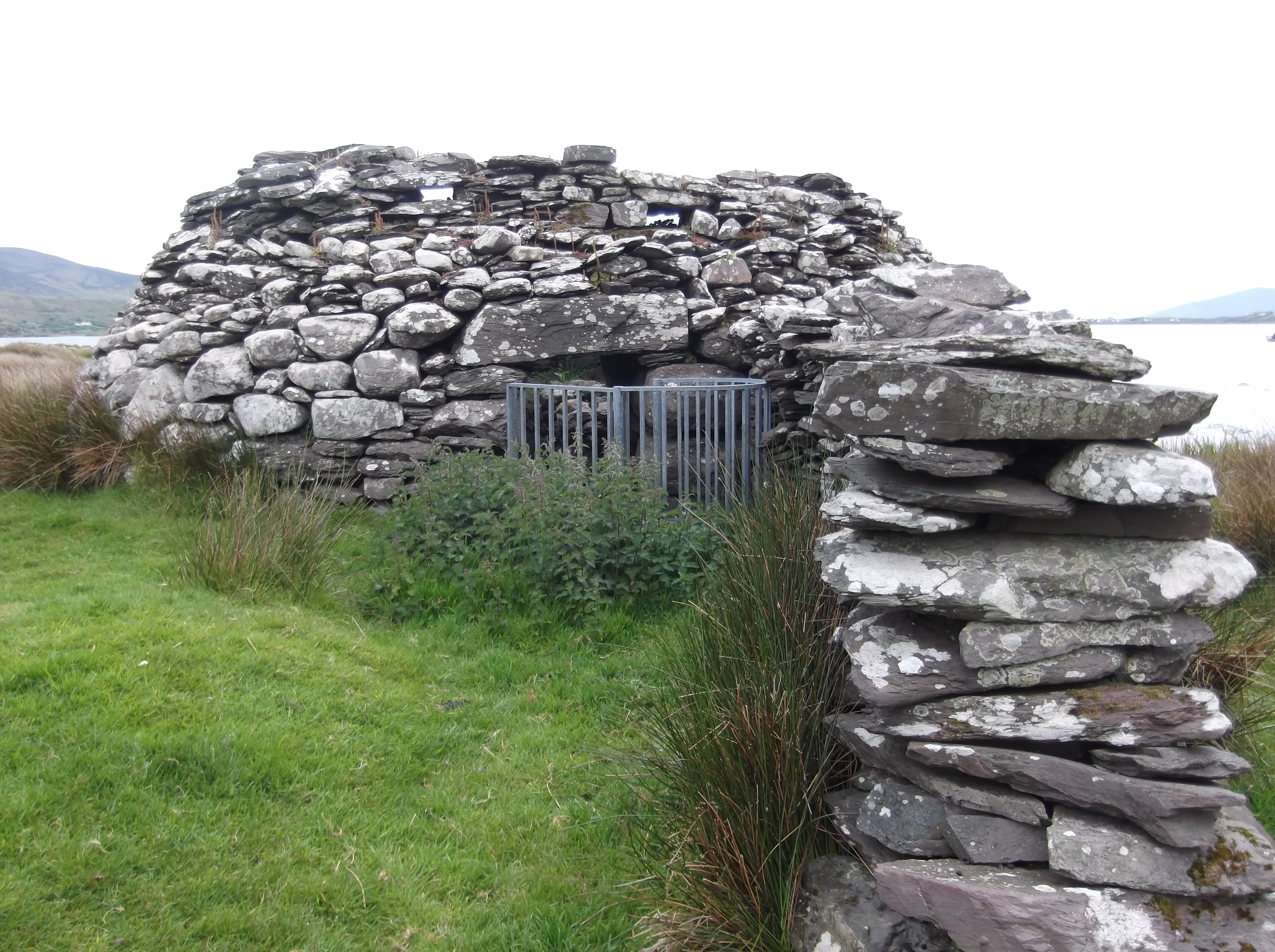
St. Finian's cell, 2014
