= Finan (surname) =

Finan is a surname. Notable people with the name include:

- Bobby Finan (1912–1983), Scottish professional football player
- Joe Finan (1927–2006), American popular radio show host
- John Finan (1898–1984), Irish Clann na Talmhan politician
- W. Timothy Finan (born 1950), American politician and jurist

== See also ==
- Finan of Lindisfarne (died 661), or Saint Finan, Irish monk
- Finnan (disambiguation)
