= Brian M. Lucey =

Economist

Brian M. Lucey is a professor at the Trinity Business School, Trinity College Dublin. He was the editor-in-chief of the International Review of Economics & Finance from May 2019 to October 2025. At the end of 2025, twelve of his papers published in Elsevier journals were retracted by the publisher, over claims that he handled the papers as an editor while also being an author. Lucey disputed that handling his own papers were grounds for retraction. Furthermore, he stated that he had "nothing to be embarrassed about".
