= Colmán of Lindisfarne =

7th-century Bishop of Lindisfarne and saint

Saint Colmán of Lindisfarne
- Bishop of Lindisfarne
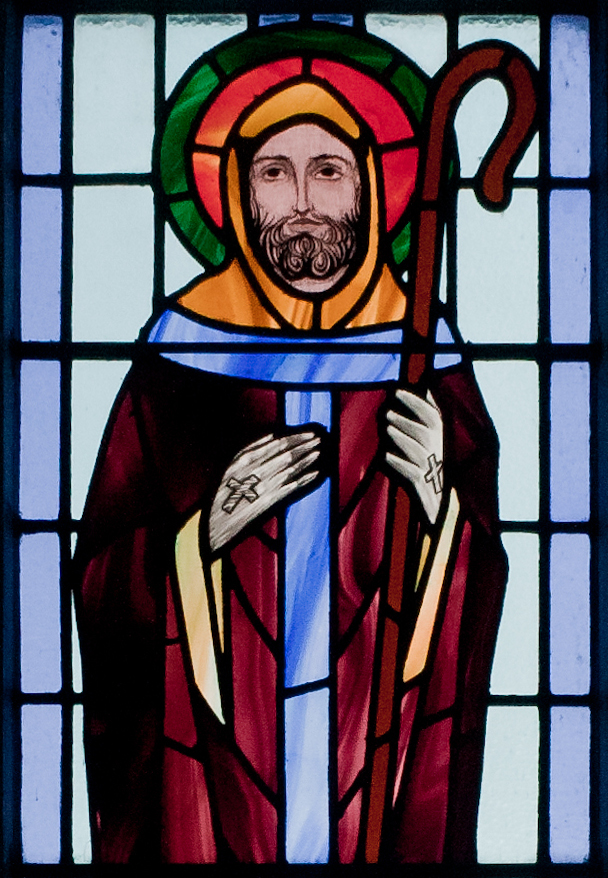
- Stained glass window of St. Colmán at St. Benin's Church, Kilbennen, County Galway
- Appointed: 661
- Term ended: resigned 664
- Predecessor: Finan of Lindisfarne
- Successor: Tuda of Lindisfarne

Personal details
- Born: c. 605 Ireland
- Died: 674 Ireland
- Denomination: Christian

Sainthood
- Feast day: 18 February
- Venerated in: Eastern Orthodox Church; Roman Catholic Church; Anglican Communion

Colmán of Lindisfarne (c. 605 – 674 AD) also known as Saint Colmán was Bishop of Lindisfarne from 661 until 664.

== Life ==
Colmán was a native of the west of Ireland and had received his education on Iona. He was probably a nobleman of the Conmaicne Mara. Colmán succeeded Aidan and Finan as bishop of Lindisfarne, being appointed in 661. Colmán resigned the Bishopric of Lindisfarne after the Synod of Whitby called by King Oswiu of Northumbria decided to calculate Easter using the method of the First Ecumenical Council instead of his preferred Celtic method. The change to the Roman Method led Colmán to leave and travel back to Scotland and eventually, back to Iona.

Later tradition states that between the years 665 and 667, Colmán founded several churches in Scotland before returning to Iona. However, there are no seventh-century records of such activity by him. From Iona he sailed for Ireland, settling at Inishbofin in 668 AD where he founded a monastery, the School of Mayo. When Colmán came to Mayo he brought with him half the relics of Lindisfarne, including the bones of St. Aidan and a part of the true cross. This was reputed to be in Mayo Abbey until its vanishment during the Reformation in 1537.

Colmán was stepping into a landscape that had been decimated by the plague of 664–665. He may have been reviving an earlier church on the island or one in the area in central Connacht where Maigh Eo was founded later. On Inishbofin a rift occurred between the Irish and the English "because in summer the Irish went off to wander on their own around places they knew instead of assisting at harvest, and then, as winter approached, came back and wanted to share whatever the English monks had gathered."

What was the reason for their intermittent absence? Earlier commentators suspected that the two nations came from different agricultural backgrounds and that the Irish intermittently removed themselves from the island with the monastery's livestock for the purpose of ‘booleying’, a form of transhumance. It is also possible that the Irish visited their kinsfolk on the mainland. Returning to the island in winter, they helped to consume the fruits of the Saxons' labours. This situation inevitably led to tensions within the community. Disputes arose between the Saxon and Irish monks after a short time. Colmán brought his Saxon followers onto the mainland and founded a monastery for them at "Magh Eó" - the Plain of Yew Trees, subsequently known as "Mayo of the Saxons".

Colmán's last days were spent on the island of Inishbofin, where he died in 674. His feast is celebrated on 8 August and on 13 November.

Christian titles
Preceded by Finan	Bishop of Lindisfarne; 661–664	Succeeded by Tuda
