= International Review of Economics & Finance =

- Language: English
- Edited by: Feng He, Andrew Urquhart, Xuguang Simon Sheng

Publication details
- History: 1992–present
- Publisher: Elsevier
- Frequency: Bimonthly
- Impact factor: 5.6 (2024)

Standard abbreviations
- ISO 4: Int. Rev. Econ. Finance

Indexing
- ISSN: 1059-0560
- OCLC no.: 60629853

Links
- Journal homepage; Online access

The International Review of Economics & Finance is a bimonthly peer-reviewed academic journal that covers research in theoretical and empirical international economics, macroeconomics, and financial economics. The journal was established in 1992 and is published by Elsevier. It publishes academic research papers analyzing the real and the financial sectors of open and closed economies.

== Abstracting and indexing ==
The journal is abstracted and indexed by ABI/Inform, Journal of Economic Literature, and the Social Sciences Citation Index. According to the Journal Citation Reports, the journal has a 2024 impact factor of 5.6.
