= Finnan =

Finnan may refer to:

== Places ==
- Findon, Aberdeenshire, Scotland, known as Finnan
- Glen Finnan, a valley in the Highlands of Scotland
- Glenfinnan, a settlement at the bottom of the glen
- River Finnan, which flows down the Scottish glen

== People ==
- Aengus Finnan (born 1972), Canadian folk musician
- Connie Finnan (born 1962), Irish professional darts player
- Frank Finnan (1897–1966), Australian politician
- Sharon Finnan (fl. 1988–2015), Australian netball player
- Steve Finnan (born 1976), Irish footballer

== See also ==
- Finnian (disambiguation)
- Finan (disambiguation)
- Finnan haddie
- Glenfinnan Viaduct
