= Synod of Whitby =

Anglo-Saxon church council held in 664

The Synod of Whitby was a Christian administrative gathering held in Northumbria in 664, wherein King Oswiu ruled that his kingdom would calculate Easter and observe the monastic tonsure according to the customs of Rome rather than the customs practised by Irish monks at Iona and its satellite institutions. The synod was summoned at Hilda's double monastery of Streonshalh (Streanæshalch), later called Whitby Abbey, in modern day Yorkshire.

== Sources ==
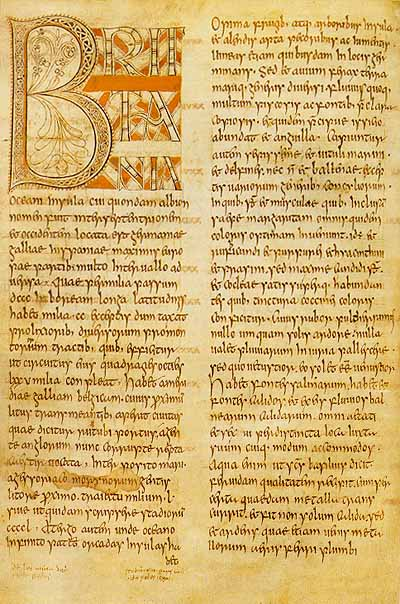
A manuscript of Bede's Historia Ecclesiastica gentis Anglorum.

There are two principal sources for the synod. The first source, the Life of Wilfrid, is a hagiographic work written by Stephen of Ripon, often identified as Eddius Stephanus, probably soon after 710. The second source is the Historia Ecclesiastica gentis Anglorum by Bede, written in 731. One of Bede's sources was the Life of Wilfrid itself, but he also had access to people who knew participants in the synod. For example, Bede knew Acca of Hexham, and dedicated many of his theological works to him. Acca was a companion of Wilfrid's on some of his journeys to Rome.

Both accounts basically agree, though Bede gives a much lengthier discourse on the debate. The description of the proceedings, where King Oswiu presides and rules but does not engage in the ecclesiastics' debate himself, parallels examples of other synods in other sources, such as one in the Vita Sancti Bonifati by Willibald (where King Ine of Wessex performed the same function as Oswiu). Nonetheless, it is important to observe that the authors, despite their relatively good access to sources concerning the synod, still wrote at a distance, and the accounts, especially the quotations attributed to the participants, are more likely to be summaries of how Bede and Stephen understood the issue rather than something like true quotations. Further, the motivations of the authors influenced how they presented the material. Bede placed his description of the event centrally in his narrative, and he has been recognised as overemphasising the historical significance of the synod because Easter calculation was of special interest to him, and also because he wished to stress the unity of the English Church. However, Bede's accuracy as a historian has been well regarded by Anglo-Saxon scholars, and historians have generally been comfortable following Bede's basic presentation of the synod. Stephen's text has found more criticism, and Reginald Poole identified many of his inaccuracies, but Stephen's account of the synod did not suffer the same criticism as other passages in his work.

== Background ==
In seventh-century Britain there were several differences between Roman and Celtic Christianity. One of these was the method of calculating the date of Easter. The Celtic practice was that of the Gaelic monks associated with the isle of Iona and its extensive network of daughter-houses, where the monks still observed an 84-year Easter cycle (as had earlier been the rule in Gaul and in Rome), whereas the newer tradition which was kept in Rome by this time was a 19-year cycle which had been adopted from the church of Alexandria.

In the kingdom of Northumbria, these two traditions coexisted, and each had been encouraged by different royal houses. Edwin of Northumbria had converted to Christianity under the influence of missionaries sent from Rome by Pope Gregory the Great and thus had established the 19-year Easter cycle in his realm. However, following his death and a year of political instability, Oswald of Northumbria gained the throne. He had learned Christian practice from the monks of Iona during his stay there (while a political exile in his youth), and had encouraged Ionan missionaries to further the Christianization of Northumbria, especially the famous Bishop Aidan.

The Synod of Whitby was convened to settle a controversy about the correct method of calculating the date of Easter. Early Christians had probably originally celebrated Easter concurrent with the Jewish Passover (see Passover, Christian holiday), which was held on the fourteenth day of the first lunar month of the Jewish year, called Nisan, the day of the crucifixion according to John 19:14. However, the First Council of Nicaea in 325 decreed that Christians should no longer use the Jewish calendar but should universally celebrate Easter on a Sunday, the day of the resurrection, as had come to be the custom in Rome and Alexandria. Calculating the proper date (computus) was a complex process (involving a lunisolar calendar), and different calculation tables developed which resulted in different dates for the celebration of Easter.

In the 660s, Ionan adherents chose to continue using the 84-year Latercus cycle invented by Sulpicius Severus c. 410. Meanwhile, the Papal Curia had commissioned Victorius of Aquitaine (AD 457) and later Dionysius Exiguus (525) to produce a new reckoning, in order to resolve the differences between the Roman method and the more scientific method of the Alexandrian Church. The three reckonings often resulted in different dates for the celebration of Easter. Neither the Victorian or Dionysian reckonings were without problems. Dionysius had simply translated the Alexandrian system into Latin without understanding it. The Victorian system, confusingly, produced double dates, relying on the pope to choose which date to use. Nevertheless, the Victorian table was accepted widely outside the area of Irish influence. Around 602, the Irish missionary St Columbanus had already been condemned by a synod of French clerics for ignoring their authority and following his homeland's Easter calculations (the Victorian table was declared official in Gaul in 541). About AD 600 Columbanus wrote to Pope Gregory I: "You should know that Victorius has not been accepted by our teachers and by the old Irish experts and by the mathematicians most skilled in the calculation of the computus, but was considered more worthy of ridicule and pity than of authority." But in Ireland also, debate raged over the best option for calculating the date of Easter.

The proper date of the celebration of the most significant Christian feast had already resulted in visible disunity in the Northumbrian court: Queen Eanfled of Bernicia and her court observed Easter on a different day than did King Oswiu. While one royal faction was celebrating Easter, the other would still be fasting during Lent. Nonetheless, the disunity did not result in problems as long as the well-respected Aidan was alive. After his death, his successor Finan found himself challenged by a monk named Ronan, an Irishman who had been trained in Rome and who wished to see the Roman Easter established. It was only in the time of Colmán, the third Ionan monk elected Bishop of Northumbria, that the conflict required royal attention and resolution.

== Convocation ==
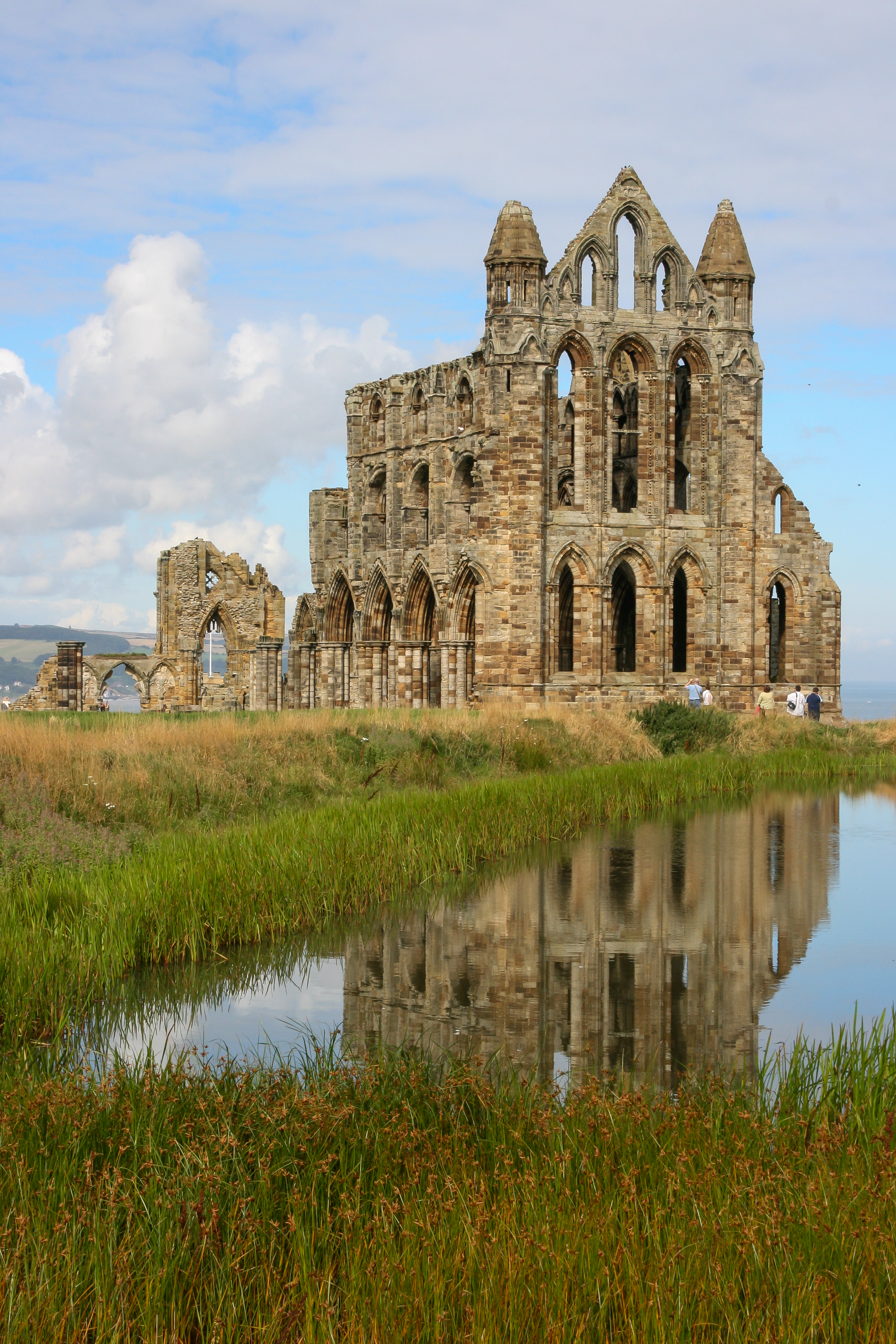
Ruins of Whitby Abbey, rebuilt in the thirteenth century

An important figure in the convocation of the synod was Alchfrith, Oswiu's son and sub-king in Deira. Henry Mayr-Harting considered him the "chief cause of trouble which led to the Synod". In the early 660s, he expelled Ionan monks from the monastery of Ripon and gave it to Wilfrid, a Northumbrian churchman who had recently returned from Rome. Alchfrith's position in the royal house, together with his promotion of Wilfrid (who would be the spokesperson for the Roman position at the synod), has contributed to the view that he was instrumental in arranging his father's convocation of the synod.

The synod was held at a place called Streanæshalch, at a monastery of Hilda, herself a powerful Northumbrian noble and adherent to the Ionan Easter. The identification of the location with the place later called Whitby is generally accepted, but not absolutely certain. Another possible candidate is Strensall near York.

The Ionan position was advocated by Colmán, Bishop of Northumbria. In support of the Roman position, Eanfled had sent her chaplain Romanus, and the position was also taken by Agilbert, a Frankish bishop who also held office in England. Because of Agilbert's inability to express the complicated arguments in (Old) English, which was for him a foreign language, Wilfrid was selected as the prime advocate for the Roman party. King Oswiu presided over the synod and acted as the final judge, who would give his royal authority in support of one side or the other.

== Decision ==
Bishop Colmán defended the Ionan calculation of Easter on the grounds that it was the practice of Columba, founder of their monastic network and a saint of unquestionable holiness, who himself had followed the tradition of St. John the apostle and evangelist.

Wilfrid defended the Roman position on the following grounds (according to Bede's narrative):

1. It was the practice in Rome, where the apostles Saints Peter and Paul had "lived, taught, suffered, and are buried".
2. It was the universal practice of the Church, even as far as Egypt.
3. The customs of the apostle John were particular to the needs of his community and his age and, since then, the Council of Nicaea had established a different practice.
4. Columba had done the best he could considering his knowledge, and thus his irregular practice is excusable, but the Ionan monks at present did not have the excuse of ignorance.
5. Whatever the case, no one has authority over Peter (and thus his successors, the bishops of Rome).

Oswiu then asked both sides if they agreed that Peter had been given the keys to the kingdom of heaven by Christ and pronounced to be "the rock" on which the Church would be built (as stated in Matthew 16:18–19), to which they agreed. Oswiu then declared his judgment in favour of the holder of the keys, i.e. the Roman (and Petrine) practice.

However, Wilfrid's method of calculating the date of Easter was the one used in Alexandria, not in Rome. Bede presented the synod as a victory for the Roman party even though he had doubts whether the method was used in Rome. He produced his own version based on the Alexandrian tables, as amended by Dionysius, for his own calculations in his De Temporibus (703) and in more detail in his De Temporum Ratione (716–25). The Bedan tables came to be accepted in the British Isles and the Carolingian Empire in the ninth century and in Rome in the tenth.

== Outcome ==
The Synod of Whitby established the supposed Roman practice as the norm in Northumbria, and thus "brought the Northumbrian church into the mainstream of Roman culture." The episcopal seat of Northumbria was transferred from Lindisfarne to York. Wilfrid, chief advocate for the Roman position, later became Bishop of Northumbria, while Colmán and the Ionan supporters who did not change their practices withdrew to Iona. Colmán was allowed to take some relics of Aidan, who had been central in establishing Christianity of the Ionan tradition in Northumbria, with him back to Iona. To replace the departing ecclesiastics, Oswiu chose mostly Irishmen who were from the parts of Ireland that kept the Roman Easter (as most of Ireland had done for some time by the 660s).

== Legacy and historical significance ==
The Synod of Whitby was just one of many councils held concerning the proper calculation of Easter throughout Latin Christendom in the Early Middle Ages. It addressed the issues of Easter calculation and of the proper monastic tonsure, and concerned only the part of the English Church that answered to the See of Lindisfarne: that is, it was a Northumbrian affair. Wilfrid's advocacy of the Roman Easter has been called "a triumphant push against an open door", since most of the Irish had already accepted the Roman Easter and for that reason Iona "was already in danger of being pushed to one side by its Irish rivals".

Although the focus on Whitby is on the decisions on tonsure and dating of Easter, the synod was an important step in the eventual Romanisation of the church in England; even though this Romanisation might have occurred anyway without the Synod of Whitby. Nonetheless, since the Protestant Reformation, the events of the synod have been symbolically interpreted as a "Celtic Church" opposing a "Roman Church", and the decision of Oswiu was thus interpreted as the "subjugation" of the "British Church" to Rome. There is a debate regarding the reality of a distinction between a pre-Whitby "Celtic" Church and a post-Whitby "Roman" Church. (Note: Until fairly recently, the Scottish Divinity Faculty course on Church History ran from the Acts of the Apostles to 664 before resuming in 1560.) In the words of Patrick Wormald:

From the days of George Buchanan, supplying the initial propaganda for the makers of the Scottish Kirk, until a startlingly recent date, there was warrant for an anti-Roman, anti-episcopal and, in the nineteenth century, anti-establishment stance in the Columban or "Celtic" Church. ... The idea that there was a "Celtic Church" in something of a post-Reformation sense is still maddeningly ineradicable from the minds of students.

In placing the synod in its historical context, historians of Anglo-Saxon England have also noted the position of the synod in the context of contemporary political tensions. Henry Mayr-Harting considered Alchfrith's interest in the convocation of the synod to be derived from his desire to see his father's position in Bernicia challenged and to see the replacement of Colmán with another bishop who would be more aligned with himself.

== See also ==
- Bretwalda
- Colmán of Lindisfarne
- Eanfled of Deira
- Easter
- Religion in the United Kingdom
- Paschal Full Moon
- The Reckoning of Time
