= Lough Currane =

Lake in County Kerry, Ireland

- Loch Luíoch (Irish)
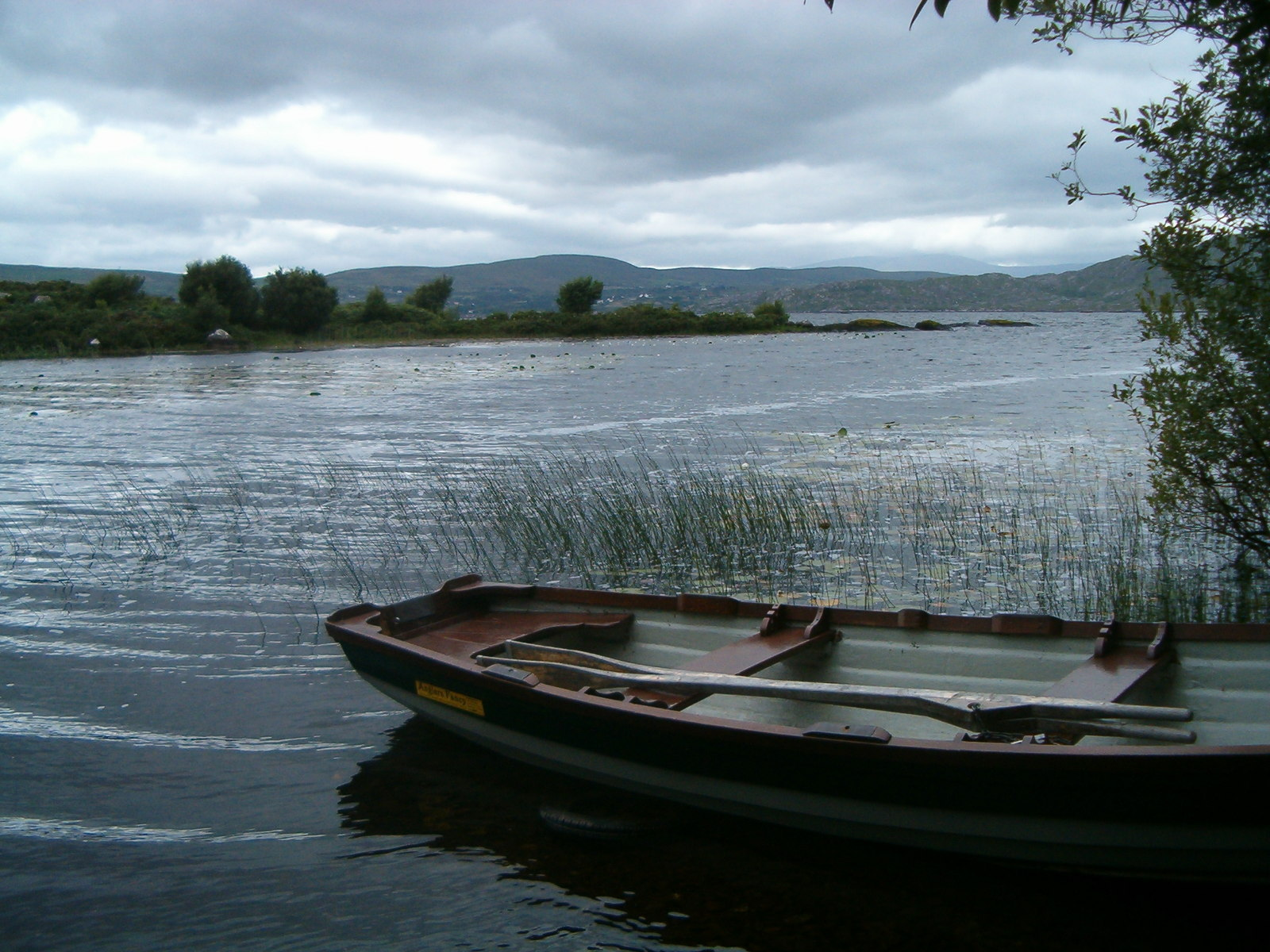

- Location in Ireland
- Location: County Kerry, Ireland
- Coordinates: 51.83°N 10.13°W
- Primary inflows: Capall River, Cummeragh River
- Primary outflows: Currane River to Ballinskelligs Bay
- Basin countries: Ireland
- Surface area: 10 km^{2} (3.9 sq mi)
- Surface elevation: 5.8 m (19 ft)
- Islands: Church Island, Rough Island, Rough Island Little, Gull Island, Rabbit Island, Oven Island, Grass Island, Carrigrower Rock, Cummeragh Island, Darby's Island, Morgan Island, Commane's Islands, Holly Island, Quarter Gannet Island, Daniel's Island, Whort Island, Fur Island, Otter Island, Arbutus Island, Tub Island Large, Tub Island Little, Horse Island, Reenaskinna Islands
- Settlements: Raheen, Waterville

Lough Currane (Irish: Loch Luíoch), also called Lough Leeagh, is a lake in County Kerry, Ireland. Waterville lies on its western bank, close to the Atlantic Ocean, it empties into Ballinskelligs Bay. The numerous townlands which lie on its southern bank, including Cappamore, Eightercua and Gortnamackanee, are collectively known as Glenmore. It covers an area of 2,500 acres (10 km^{2}) and is 3.5 miles (5.6 km) long and 2 miles (3.2 km) at the widest point. The lake is notable for the early medieval monastery on Church Island. It is associated with had the St. Finan Cam, who inhabited the island c. 7th century. To the south of the lake is Inis Uasal (Noble Island), an island dedicated to St. Finan. The Annals of Inisfallen mention that Amchad, the "anchorite of God" was buried on the island in 1058.

== Angling ==
The lough is famous for its salmon and Sea trout fly fishing, having a good run of both spring salmon and grilse in addition to regularly producing specimen sea trout with some running to over 10 lb. (4.5 kg) From June the lake contains a prolific number of smaller sea trout, know locally as 'Juners', analogous to the Scottish Finnock. In recent years the run of sea trout has reduced dramatically. The Lough was designated catch and release via a by law in 2019 in an effort to conserve stocks. As of 2024, the catch and release law remains in place.
