= Mayo, County Mayo =

Village in County Mayo, Ireland

Mayo Maigh Eo
- Village
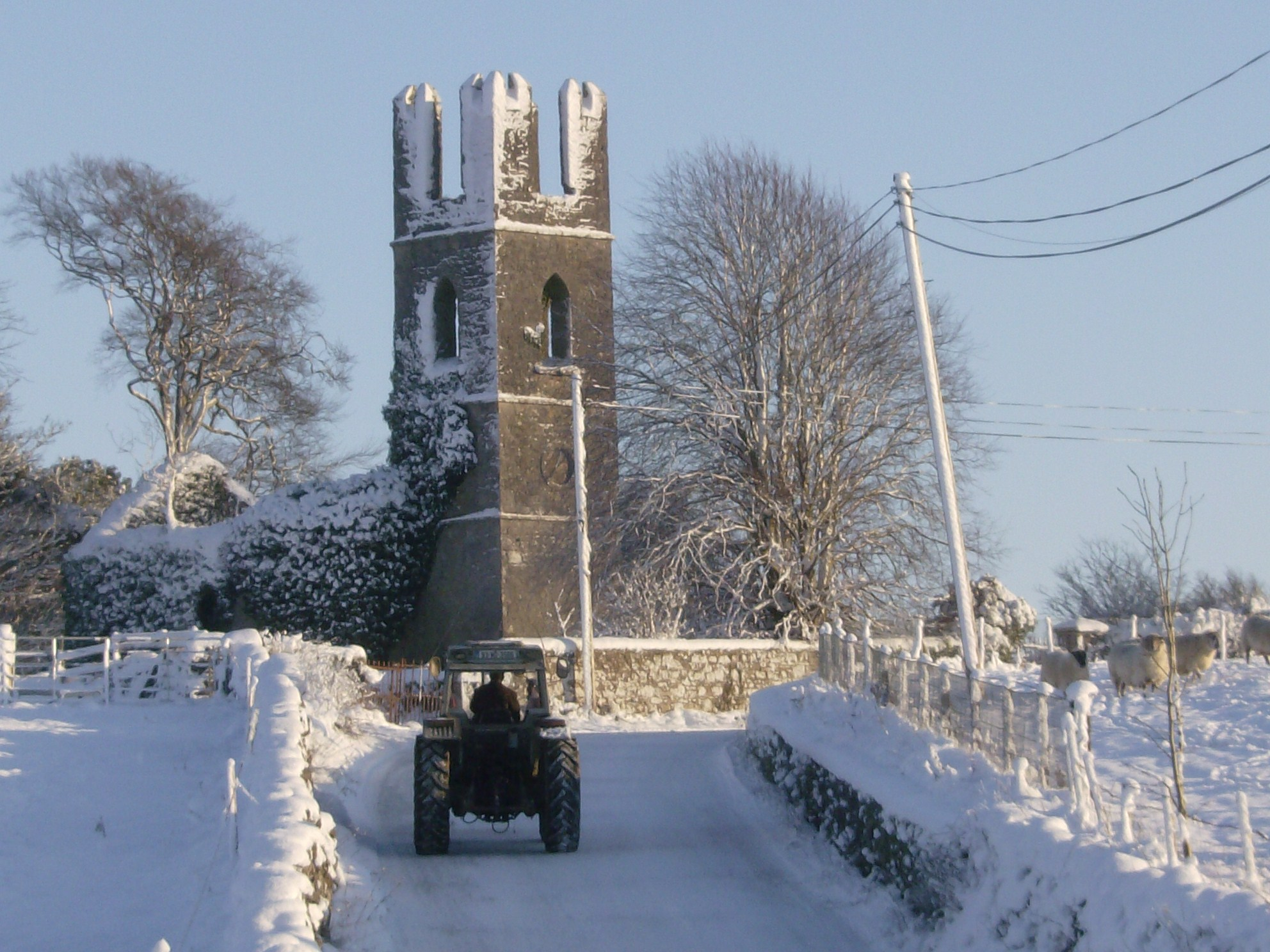
- Mayo Abbey in December 2010

- Location in Ireland
- Coordinates: 53°45′44″N 9°07′12″W
- Country: Ireland
- Province: Connacht
- County: County Mayo
- Elevation: 72 m (236 ft)
- Time zone: UTC+0 (WET)
  - Summer (DST): UTC-1 (IST (WEST))
- Irish Grid Reference: M262796

Mayo or Mayo Abbey (Irish: Maigh Eo, meaning 'plain of the yew trees') is a village in County Mayo, Ireland. Although the county bears its name, it is not the county seat, which is Castlebar. Mayo Abbey is a small historic village in south Mayo approximately 16 km to the south of Castlebar and 10 km north west of Claremorris. The village is in a civil parish of the same name.

== History ==
The village was an important centre in the Gaelic and Anglo-Saxon Christian world in the seventh and eighth centuries. St. Colmán, Bishop of Lindisfarne, founded a monastery here for a group of Saxon monks, called the School of Mayo. Saint Gerald became its first abbot in 670. Danish raiders attacked the monastery in 783 and again in 805. Finally Turgesius completely destroyed it in 818

The village was the centre of the diocese of Mayo from 1152. It was suppressed in the thirteenth century. Bishops were appointed, however, as late as the sixteenth century. One of its bishops, Patrick O'Hely, who died in 1589, is numbered among the Irish martyr saints. The diocese was formally joined to the diocese of Tuam by papal decree in 1631.

== Culture ==
The BBC four-part dramatisation of John McGahern's novel Amongst Women was filmed in Mayo Abbey using the Old Catholic Church, the graveyard and the post office/shop.

== Sport ==
Mayo Gaels is the local Gaelic football team. They compete at all underage levels as well as senior and junior football.

== Annalistic references ==
- 726 - Gerald, of Magh Eo, died on the 13th of March.
- 726 - Muireadhach, son of Indreachtach, was slain; he was Bishop of Magh Eo.
- 905 - The oratory of Magh-eo was burned.
- M1209.1. Kele O'Duffy, Bishop of Mayo of the Saxons ... died.
- M1478.1. The Bishop O'Higgin, i.e. Bishop of Mayo-na-Saxon, died.

== See also ==
- List of towns and villages in Ireland
- List of abbeys and priories in Ireland (County Mayo)
