= Waterville, County Kerry =

Seaside village in County Kerry, Ireland

Waterville An Coireán
- Village
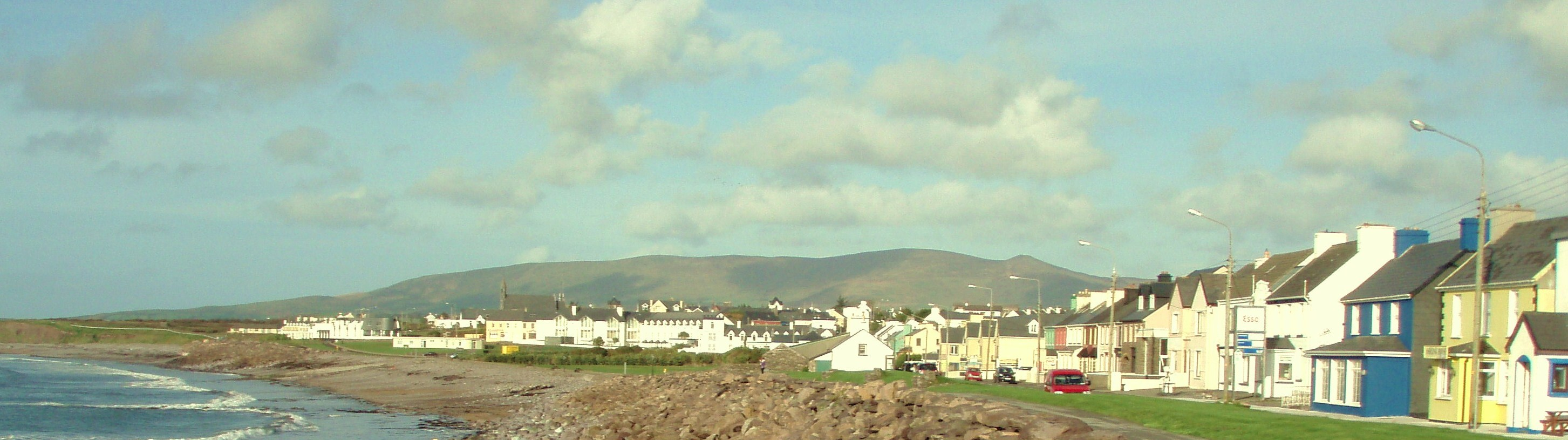
- Waterville in November sunshine

- Location in Ireland
- Coordinates: 51°49′39″N 10°10′20″W
- Country: Ireland
- Province: Munster
- County: County Kerry

Population (2022)
  - Total: 555
- Time zone: UTC+0 (WET)
  - Summer (DST): UTC+1 (IST (WEST))
- Irish Grid Reference: V499659
- Website: visitwaterville.ie

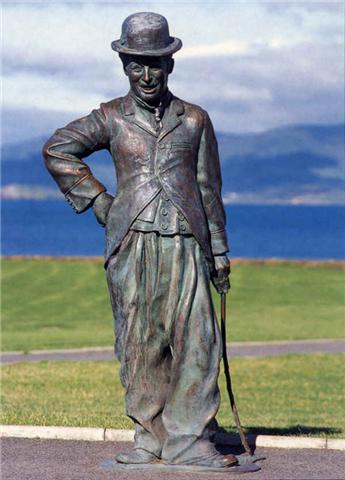
Bronze statue of Charlie Chaplin

Waterville, historically known as Currane (Irish: An Coireán, meaning 'little cauldron'), is a village in County Kerry, Ireland, on the Iveragh Peninsula. The town is on a narrow isthmus, with Lough Currane to the east and Ballinskelligs Bay on the west, with the Currane River flowing between the two. It is on the edge of the Kerry Gaeltacht (Irish-speaking district).

The N70 Ring of Kerry route passes through the town. As of the 2022 CSO census, Waterville had a population of 555.

== Name ==
The town's name in Irish, Coireán, means "little cauldron" or "little whirlpool", and refers to the shape of Ballinskelligs Bay on which the town sits. This name was anglicised as Currane or Curraun.

The Butler family built a house at the mouth of the River Currane in the latter part of the 18th century. They named their house and estate Waterville. The village that developed on the estate during the first half of the 19th century was also named Waterville.

== History ==
=== Pre-history ===
Evidence of ancient settlement in the area include a megalithic tomb at Eightercua. This four-stone alignment (stone-row) is located 1.5 km south-south-east of the village.

=== Telegraphy ===
The first successful transatlantic cable was finally laid after a number of attempts in 1865 by the Anglo American Telegraph Company between Heart's Content in Newfoundland and Labrador and Valentia Island near Waterville.

Waterville's role in transatlantic communication came later when in the 1880s, the Mackay-Bennett Commercial Cable Company laid their first Transatlantic telegraph cable from the nearby townland of Spunkane to Hazel Hill, near Canso, Nova Scotia. The cable station brought much activity to Waterville and additional housing was built to accommodate the telegraph company personnel who settled in the area. Waterville served as the principal European hub for the Commercial Cable Company.

==== Telegraph cables ====
On 13 July 1866, SS Great Eastern steamed westward from Valentia Island laying telegraph cable behind her. The successful landing at Heart's Content, Newfoundland on 27 July, established the first telegraph link between Europe and North America.

Later, additional cables were laid from Valentia Island and new stations opened at Ballinskelligs (1874) and Waterville (1884) making County Kerry a focal point for intercontinental communication. The Commercial Cable Company were able to lay cables from Waterville to Canso, Nova Scotia, with onward connections. Connections from Waterville to Weston-super-Mare in England and Le Havre in France were soon established. During the Civil War, the communication system between Paris and New York went down on 7 August 1922 when IRA irregulars seized Waterville.

In July 2000, the cable stations received an International Milestone Heritage Site Award from the IEEE (Institute of Electronic and Electrical Engineers Inc USA) for their significance in the history of electrical science. The Kerry cable stations are recognised as World Heritage Communications Sites.

Waterville's cable station history is outlined in an exhibition in the Tech Amergin centre, and the remaining structures and locations feature in the Waterville Heritage Trail.

=== Coastal erosion ===
The town has been fighting back against coastal erosion since the early 20th century.

== Community ==
Charlie Chaplin and his family first visited the town in 1959. They then returned to holiday in the town every year for over ten years. The community continued the connection to Chaplin by obtaining permission from the Charlie Chaplin estate to hold the inaugural Charlie Chaplin Comedy Film Festival in the spirit of Charlie Chaplin. The first festival was held in August 2011.

The Tech Amergin adult education centre (named after Amergin Glúingel, a mythical explorer to the area) is used as a venue for events, shows and exhibitions, and vocational training.

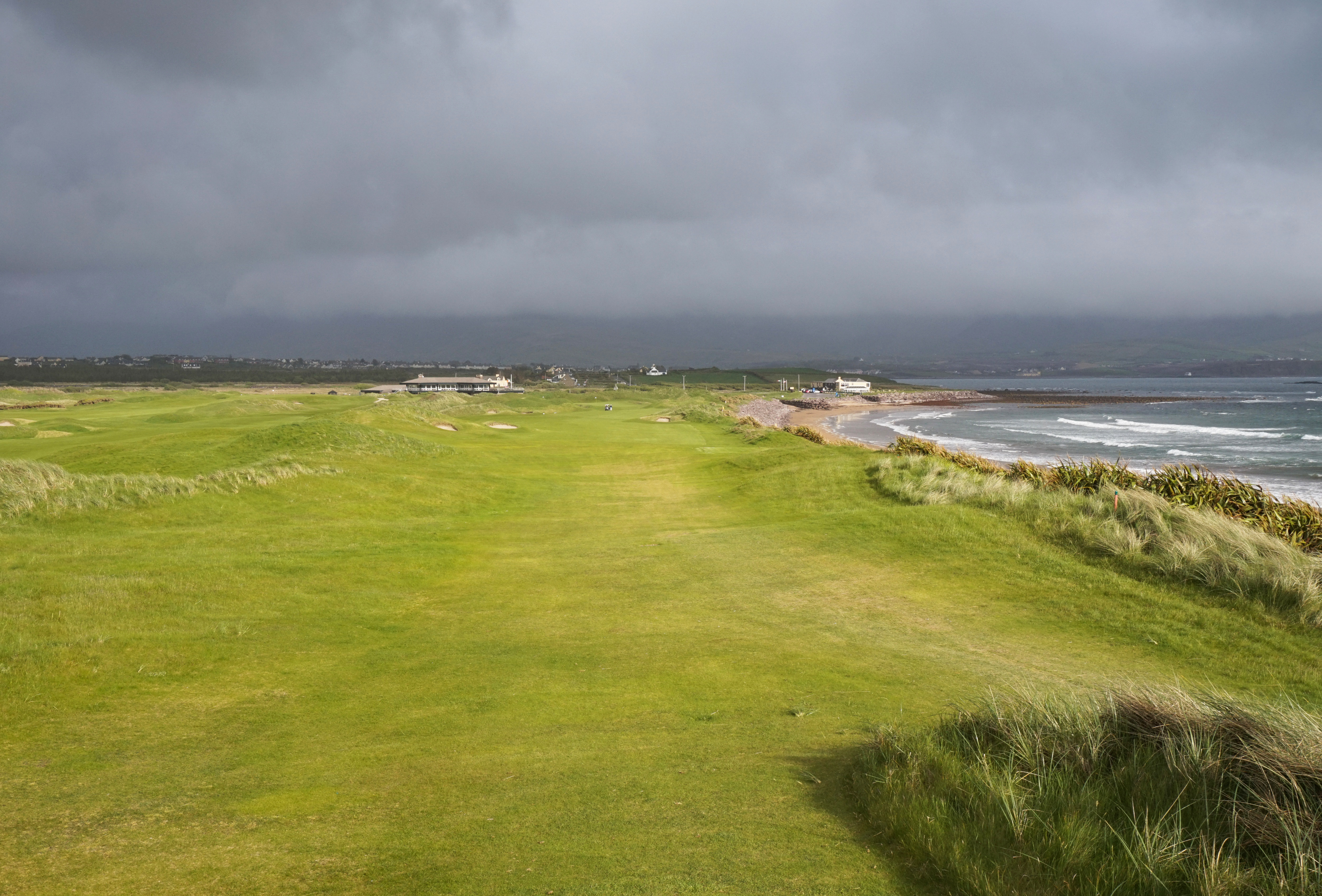
Waterville Golf Links

== Sport ==
Waterville Golf links was voted the 35th best golf course in UK and Ireland, in 2022. The newer Hogs Head Golf Club was named "Best New International Course" in 2018 by Golf Magazine.

Waterville GAA is the local Gaelic Athletic Association club. The club's facilities have been rebuilt and include a gym and public running track.

== Notable people ==
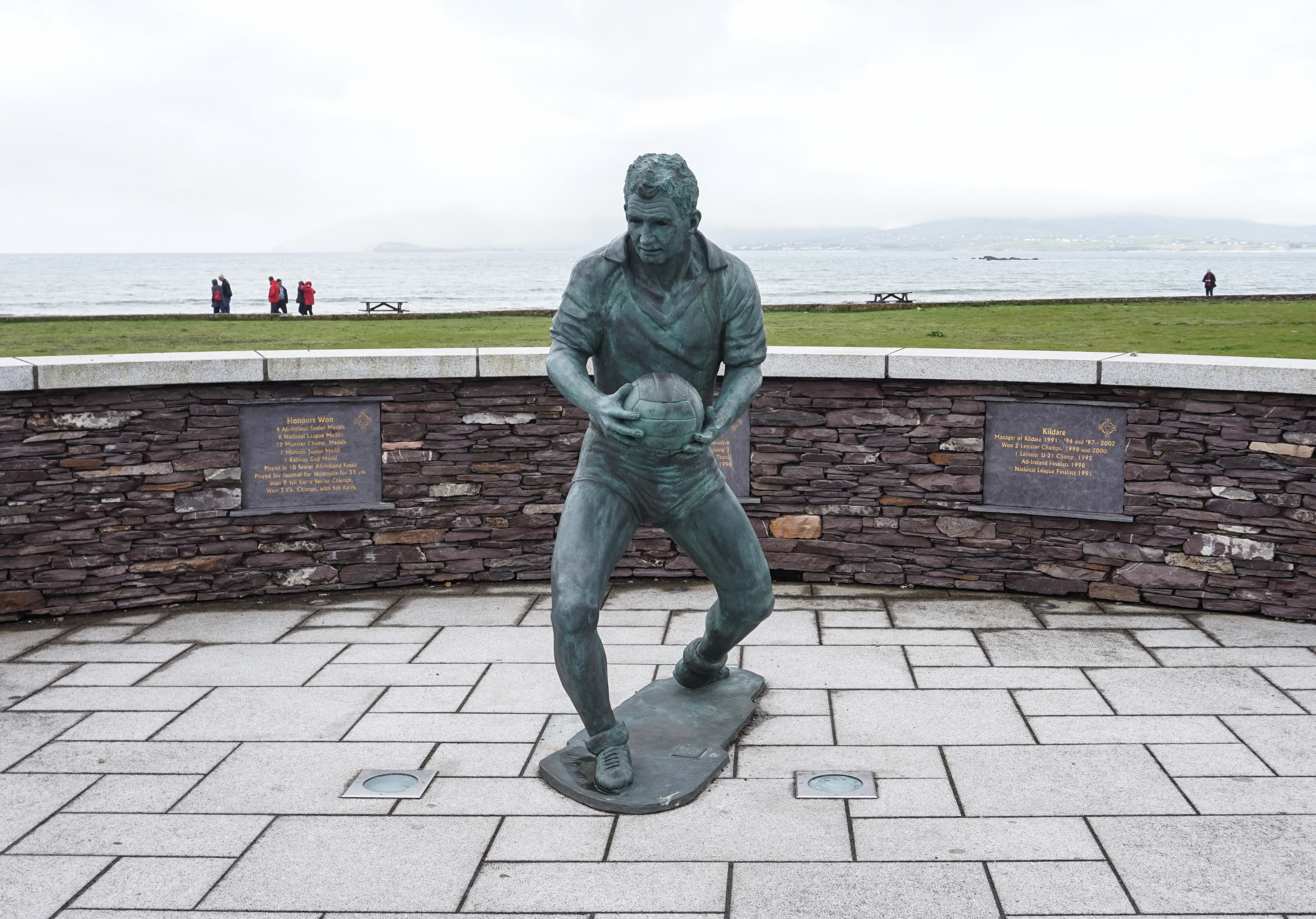
Mick O'Dwyer statue

- Charlie Chaplin and his family visited the town as a favoured holiday spot. There is a statue of Chaplin in the centre of the village in his memory.
- Brian Lucey, Irish economist.
- Mick O'Dwyer, Gaelic footballer and manager, was from the area. There is also a statue to O'Dwyer in the town.
- The Marquess of Lansdowne, the Hartopps and the Butlers were landowners and landlords in the area. Both the Hartopps and Butlers were considered helpful to tenants and created local employment. In a tourist guide of the 1860s, the Hartopp Arms Hotel and Butler's Arms were described as "stately" and "comfortable" respectively. The Hartopp Arms, later known as the Southern Lake Hotel, was demolished and the Waterville Lake Hotel constructed in its place at the beginning of the 1970s.
- John Moores, the future owner of Littlewoods football pools, mail order and stores was based in Waterville between November 1920 and May 1922 when employed as a telegraphist.
- Samantha Power, an Irish-born American diplomat, has relatives from the village, owns a holiday home in the area, and was married in Waterville.

== See also ==
- List of towns and villages in Ireland
