= Finian Lobhar =

Irish saint

Finian the Leper

Saint
- Born: Bregia, Leinster, Ireland
- Died: 560 AD
- Honored in: Eastern Orthodox Church; Roman Catholic Church
- Feast: 16 March

Saint Finian the Leper (Irish: Fíonán Lobhar) was an early Irish saint credited by some sources with founding a church and monastery at Innisfallen in Killarney. (Note: According to John Healy it is unlikely that Finian Lobhar founded the church and monastery at Innisfallen in the extreme southwest of Ireland, and much more likely that Saint Finan Cam was the founder, since Finan Cam was born and spent most of his life in this area.)

== Life ==
Saint Finian was a disciple of St. Columba. He was a strict Irish abbot, whose monks followed a vegetarian diet. For a period of time in the 7th century, he was the leader of the monastery at Clonmore, County Carlow, later becoming the abbot of Swords Abbey near Dublin. He may have returned to Clonmore in his later years, and was called Lobhar, "The Leper". Following the custom, he acquired the name when he contracted leprosy from a young boy, whom he had cured of the disease. A conflicting source, however, says that he only cured the boy and did not contract leprosy himself. His feast day is 16 March.

The village of Ardfinnan (Irish: Ard Fhíonáin, meaning 'Fíonán's height') is in reference to him, where he is said to have established an abbey.

== Sources ==
- Healy, John (1890), Insula Sanctorum Et Doctorum, BoD – Books on Demand, ISBN 978-3-7523-3423-4
