= Aidan of Lindisfarne =

Irish monk and saint (died 651)

Saint Aidan of Lindisfarne
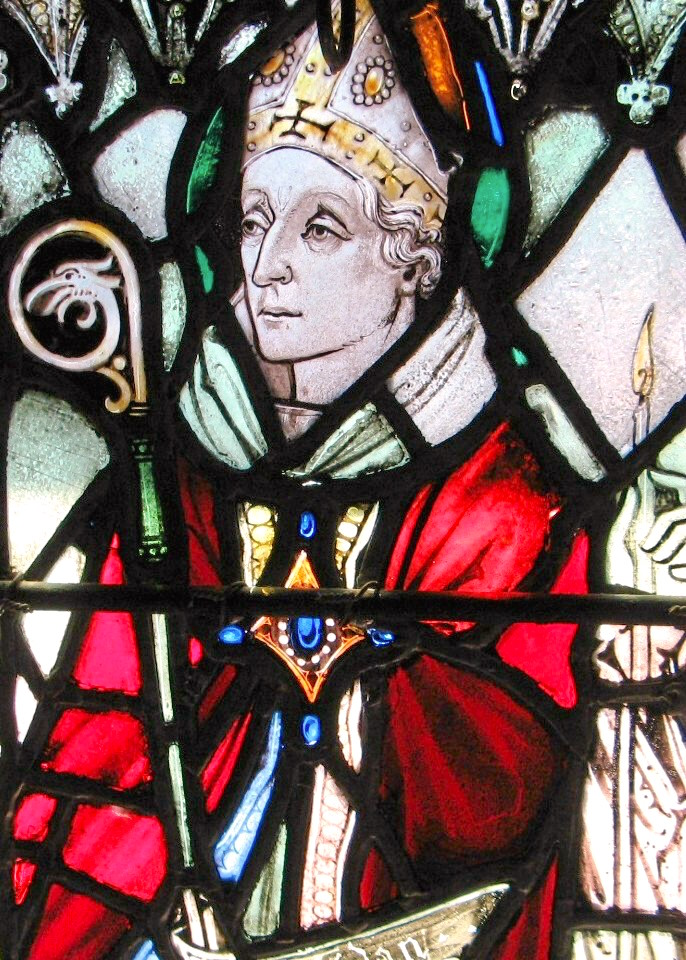
- Stained glass at Holy Cross Monastery

Bishop
- Born: c. 590; Ireland
- Died: 31 August 651; Parish Churchyard, Bamburgh, Northumbria (now in England)
- Venerated in: Roman Catholic Church; Eastern Orthodox Church; Anglican Communion; Lutheranism
- Major shrine: Originally Lindisfarne Abbey, Northumberland; later disputed between Iona Abbey and Glastonbury Abbey (all destroyed)
- Feast: 31 August (Eastern Orthodox, Catholic Church, Anglican Communion); 9 June (Lutheran Churchmarsh)
- Attributes: Monk holding a flaming torch; stag
- Patronage: Northumbria; firefighters

Aidan of Lindisfarne (Note: Aidan is the anglicised form of the original Old Irish Áedán.) (Irish: Naomh Aodhán; died 31 August 651) was an Irish monk and missionary credited with converting the Anglo-Saxons to Christianity in Northumbria. He founded a ministry cathedral on the island of Lindisfarne, known as Lindisfarne Priory, served as its first bishop, and travelled ceaselessly throughout the countryside, spreading the gospel to both the Anglo-Saxon nobility and the socially disenfranchised (including children and slaves).

He is known as the Apostle of Northumbria and is recognised as a saint by the Catholic Church, the Eastern Orthodox Church, the Anglican Communion, and others.

== Biography ==
Bede's meticulous and detailed account of Aidan's life provides the basis for most biographical sketches (both classical and modern). Bede says virtually nothing of the monk's early life, save that he was a monk at the ancient monastery on the island of Iona from a relatively young age and that he was of Irish descent. According to Catholic tradition, in Aidan's early years, he was a disciple of Saint Senan on Inis Cathaigh. Aidan was known for his strict asceticism.

=== Background ===
Aidan (died 651) was the founder and first bishop of the Lindisfarne island monastery in England. He is credited with restoring Christianity to Northumbria. Aidan is the Anglicised form of the original Old Irish Aedán, Modern Irish Aodhán (meaning 'little fiery one'). Possibly born in Connacht, Aidan was originally a monk at the monastery on the Island of Iona, founded by St Columba.

In the years prior to Aidan's mission, Christianity throughout Britain was being largely displaced by Anglo-Saxon paganism. In the monastery of Iona (founded by Columba of the Irish Church), Christianity soon found one of its principal exponents in Oswald of Northumbria, a noble youth who had been raised there as a king in exile since 616. Baptized as a Christian, the young king vowed to bring Christianity back to his people—an opportunity that presented itself in 634, when he gained the crown of Northumbria.

Owing to his historical connection to Iona's monastic community, King Oswald requested that missionaries be sent from that monastery instead of the Roman-sponsored monasteries of Southern England. At first, they sent him a bishop named Cormán, but he alienated many people by his harshness, and returned in failure to Iona reporting that the Northumbrians were too stubborn to be converted. Aidan criticized Cormán's methods and was soon sent as his replacement. He became bishop in 635.

=== Missionary efforts ===
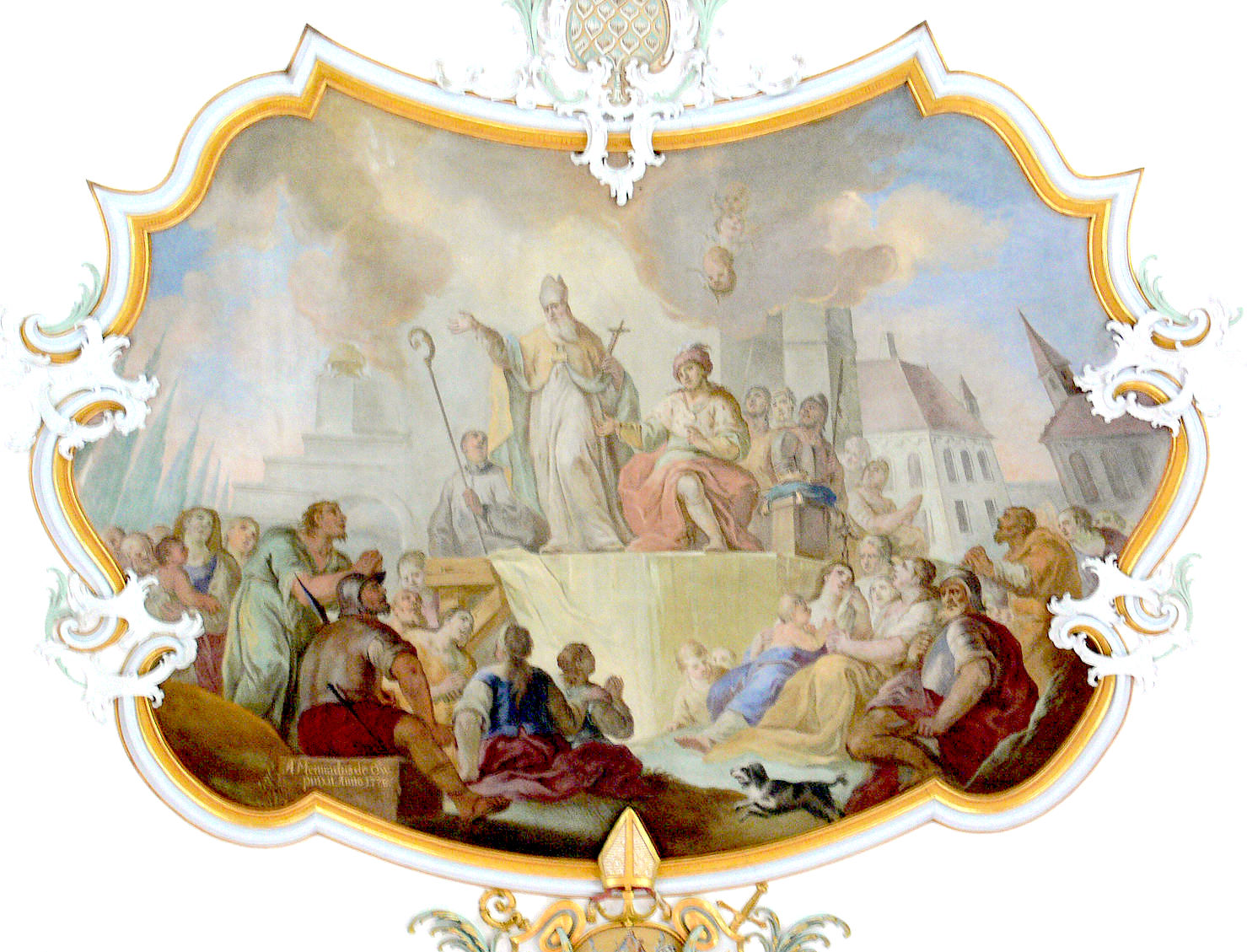
Ceiling fresco in St. Oswald Church, Bad Schussenried, Germany: King Oswald of Northumbria translates the sermon of Aidan into the Anglo-Saxon language, by Andreas Meinrad von Ow, 1778.

Allying himself with the pious king, Aidan chose the island of Lindisfarne, which was close to the royal castle at Bamburgh, as the seat of his diocese. An inspired missionary, Aidan would walk from one village to another, politely conversing with the people he saw and slowly interesting them in Christianity: in this, he followed the early apostolic model of conversion, by offering "them first the milk of gentle doctrine, to bring them by degrees, while nourishing them with the Divine Word, to the true understanding and practice of the more advanced precepts." By patiently talking to the people on their own level (and by taking an active interest in their lives and communities), Aidan and his monks slowly restored Christianity to the Northumbrian countryside. King Oswald, who after his years of exile had a perfect command of Irish, often had to translate for Aidan and his monks, who did not speak English at first.

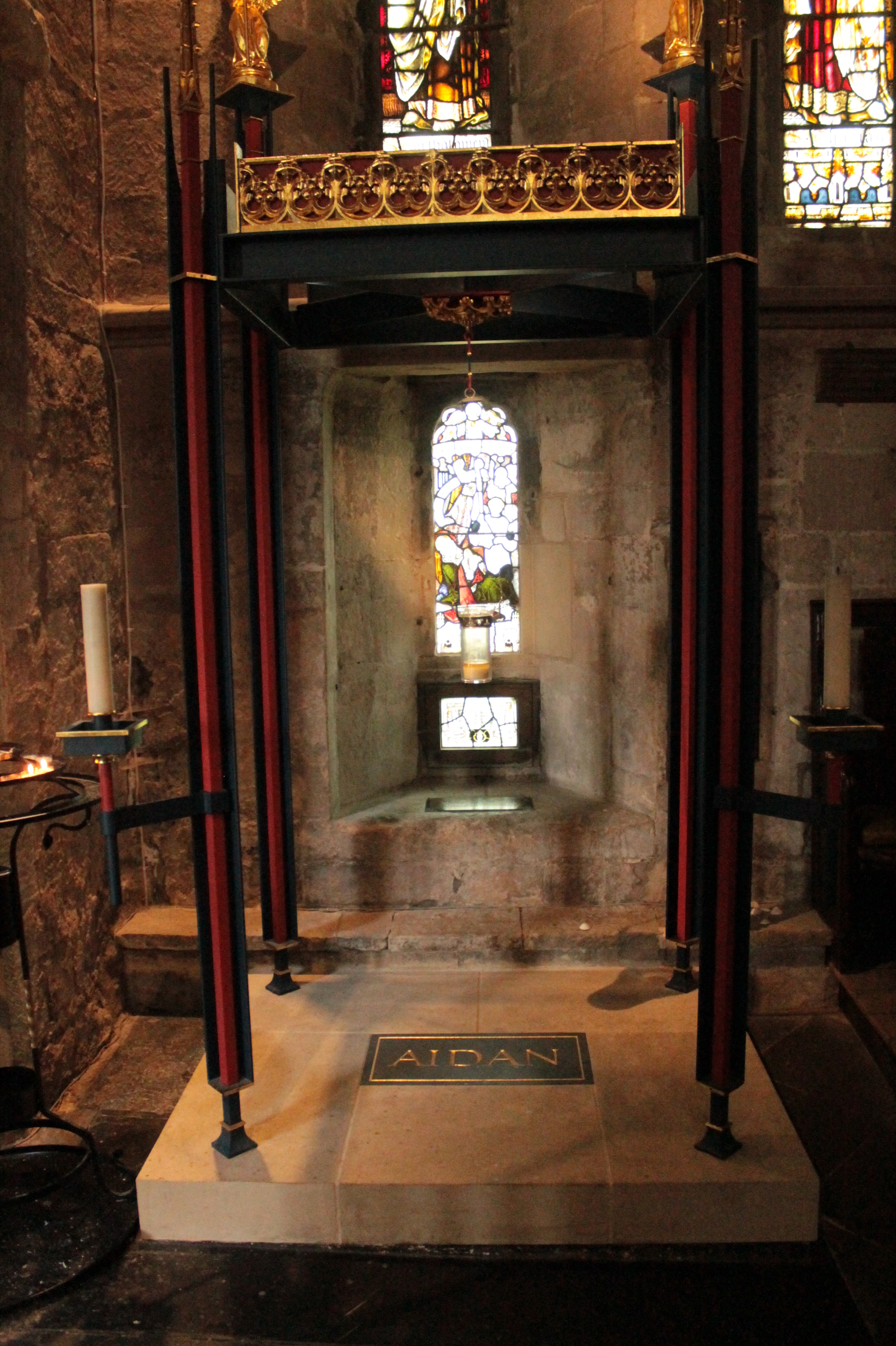
Shrine of St Aidan, St Aidan's Church, Bamburgh

In his years of evangelism, Aidan was responsible for the construction of churches, monasteries and schools throughout Northumbria. At the same time, he earned a tremendous reputation for his pious charity and dedication to the less fortunate—such as his tendency to provide room, board and education to orphans, and his use of contributions to pay for the freedom of slaves:

He was one to traverse both town and country on foot, never on horseback, unless compelled by some urgent necessity; and wherever in his way he saw any, either rich or poor, he invited them, if infidels, to embrace the mystery of the faith or if they were believers, to strengthen them in the faith, and to stir them up by words and actions to alms and good works. [...] This [the reading of scriptures and psalms, and meditation upon holy truths] was the daily employment of himself and all that were with him, wheresoever they went; and if it happened, which was but seldom, that he was invited to eat with the king, he went with one or two clerks, and having taken a small repast, made haste to be gone with them, either to read or write. At that time, many religious men and women, stirred up by his example, adopted the custom of fasting on Wednesdays and Fridays, till the ninth hour, throughout the year, except during the fifty days after Easter. He never gave money to the powerful men of the world, but only meat, if he happened to entertain them; and, on the contrary, whatsoever gifts of money he received from the rich, he either distributed them, as has been said, to the use of the poor, or bestowed them in ransoming such as had been wrongfully sold for slaves. Moreover, he afterwards made many of those he had ransomed his disciples, and after having taught and instructed them, advanced them to the order of priesthood.

— Bede's Ecclesiastical History of the English Nation (Book III: Chapter V); Butler, 406–407.

The monastery he founded grew and helped found churches and other religious institutions throughout the area. It also served as a centre of learning and a storehouse of scholarly knowledge, training many of Aidan's young charges for a career in the priesthood. Though Aidan was a member of the Irish branch of Christianity, his character and energy in missionary work won him the respect of Pope Honorius I and Felix of Dunwich.

When Oswald died in 642, Aidan received continued support from King Oswine of Deira and the two became close friends. As such, the monk's ministry continued relatively unchanged until the rise of pagan hostilities in 651.

During the time that he was bishop, the hostile army of the Mercians, under the command of Penda, cruelly ravaged the country of the Northumbrians far and near, even to the royal city, which has its name from Bebba, formerly its queen. Not being able to take it by storm or by siege, he endeavoured to burn it down; and having pulled down all the villages in the neighbourhood of the city, he brought thither an immense quantity of beams, rafters, partitions, wattles and thatch, wherewith he encompassed the place to a great height on the land side, and when he found the wind favourable, he set fire to it and attempted to burn the town. At that time, the most reverend Bishop Aidan was dwelling in the Isle of Fame, which is about two miles from the city; for thither he was wont often to retire to pray in solitude and silence; and, indeed, this lonely dwelling of his is to this day shown in that island. When he saw the flames of fire and the smoke carried by the wind rising above the city walls, he is said to have lifted up his eyes and hands to heaven, and cried with tears, "Behold, Lord, how great evil is wrought by Penda!" These words were hardly uttered, when the wind immediately veering from the city, drove back the flames upon those who had kindled them, so that some being hurt, and all afraid, they forebore any further attempts against the city, which they perceived to be protected by the hand of God.

— Bede's Ecclesiastical History of the English Nation

== Legacy and veneration ==
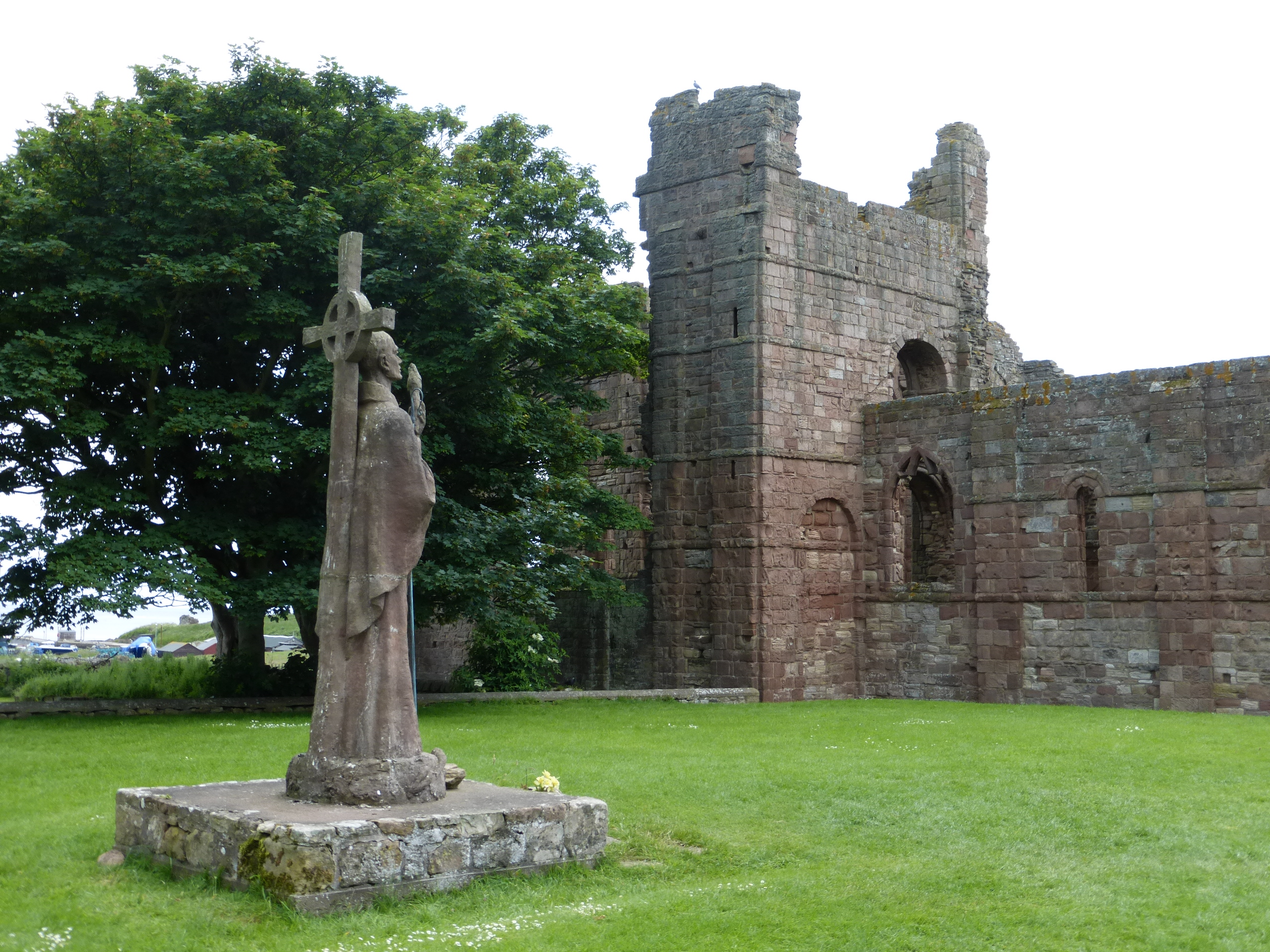
Modern statue of St. Aidan beside the ruins of the medieval priory on Lindisfarne

After his death, Aidan's body was buried at Lindisfarne, beneath the abbey that he had helped found. Though his popularity waned in the coming years, "in the 11th century Glastonbury monks obtained some supposed relics of Aidan; through their influence Aidan's feast appears in the early Wessex calendars, which provide the main evidence for his cult after the age of Bede."

His feast is celebrated on the anniversary of his death, 31 August. Reflecting his Irish origins, his Scottish monasticism and his ministry to the English, Aidan has been proposed as a possible patron saint for the whole of the United Kingdom.

Aidan is honored in the Church of England and the Episcopal Church on 31 August.

St Aidan's Church of England Secondary School in Harrogate, North Yorkshire, is named for him, as is St Aidan's College of the University of Durham.

Christian titles
| New diocese | Bishop of Lindisfarne; 635–651 | Succeeded by Finan |
