= Finan Cam =

Saint Finan Cam
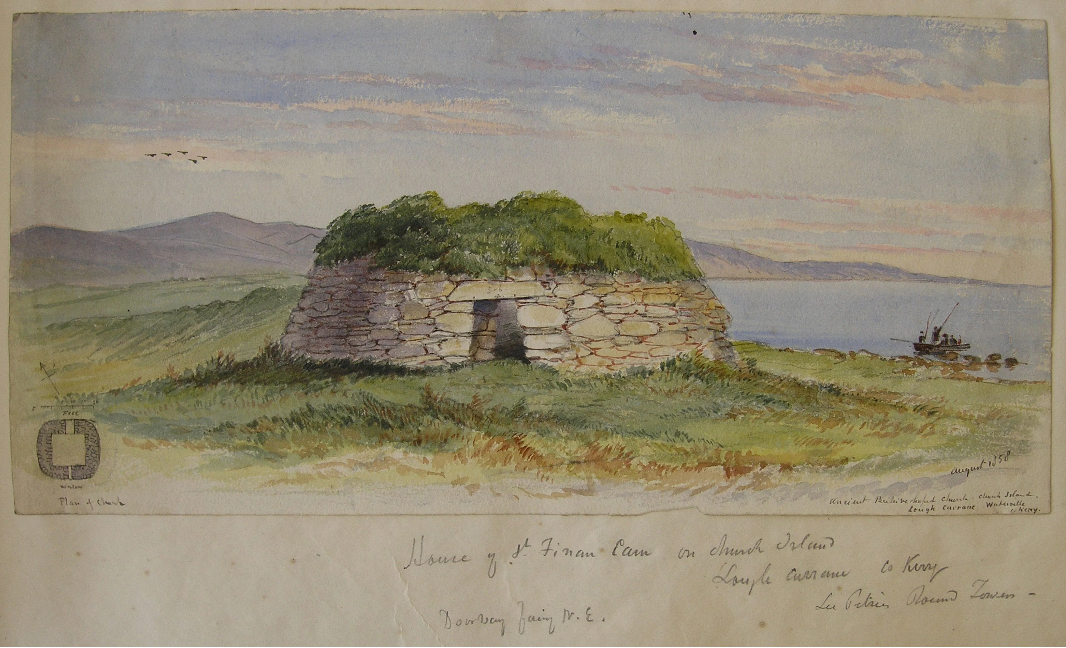
- House of Finan Cam on Church Island, Lough Currane, County Kerry by George Victor Du Noyer (1817–1869)
- Born: Early 6th century Munster, Ireland
- Residence: Church Island, Lough Currane
- Feast: 7 April

Finan Cam (or Fionan, Finian), Abbot of Kinnity was an early Irish saint associated with County Kerry, Ireland, who lived in the 6th century AD, and possibly the 7th century. (Note: The hagiographer Alban Butler cites Colgan in his brief statement, "He [Finan of Keann-Ethich] was a native of Munster, and a disciple of St. Brendan, with whose blessing he founded the monastery of Cean-e-thich, on the confines of Munster and Meath, and afterwards some others." John O'Hanlon in his biography of Finan in his Lives of the Irish Saints says that Colgan's manuscript, preserved among the Franciscan Convent Records, Dublin, was a "very confused narrative". He draws on the Royal Irish Academy's Manuscript Life of St. Fionan, of Kinnety, and Irish Life of St. Fionan, of Lough Laidhach, among other sources. John Healy in his Insula Sanctorum Et Doctorum disagrees with O'Hanlon in several points, including Finan's approximate date of birth.) To distinguish him from other saints of the same name the appellation of Cam or "crooked" has been given to him, either because he was stooped or because he had a squint. His feast day is 7 April.

== Origins ==
According to O'Hanlon (1875), Finan was descended from the family of Conaire Cóem, King of Ireland; and his father was Kennedy, son to Maenag, son of Ardeus, son to Fidai, son of Corcain, son to Nicadin, son of Irchuinnius, son to Cormac Finn, son of Corcodubnius, son to Cairbre Musc, son of King Conaire. Thus, he descended from the Corcu Duibne, i.e. of the race of Cairbre Musc, son to Conaire, who belonged to the posterity of Érimón. The O'Clerys state that Becnat, daughter of Cian, was his mother. The Life of St. Brendan describes Finan's father, Mac Airde, as a man of considerable wealth who gave thirty cows to Saint Brendan shortly after the saint was born. It is likely that Brendan and Finan were blood relatives.

== Life ==
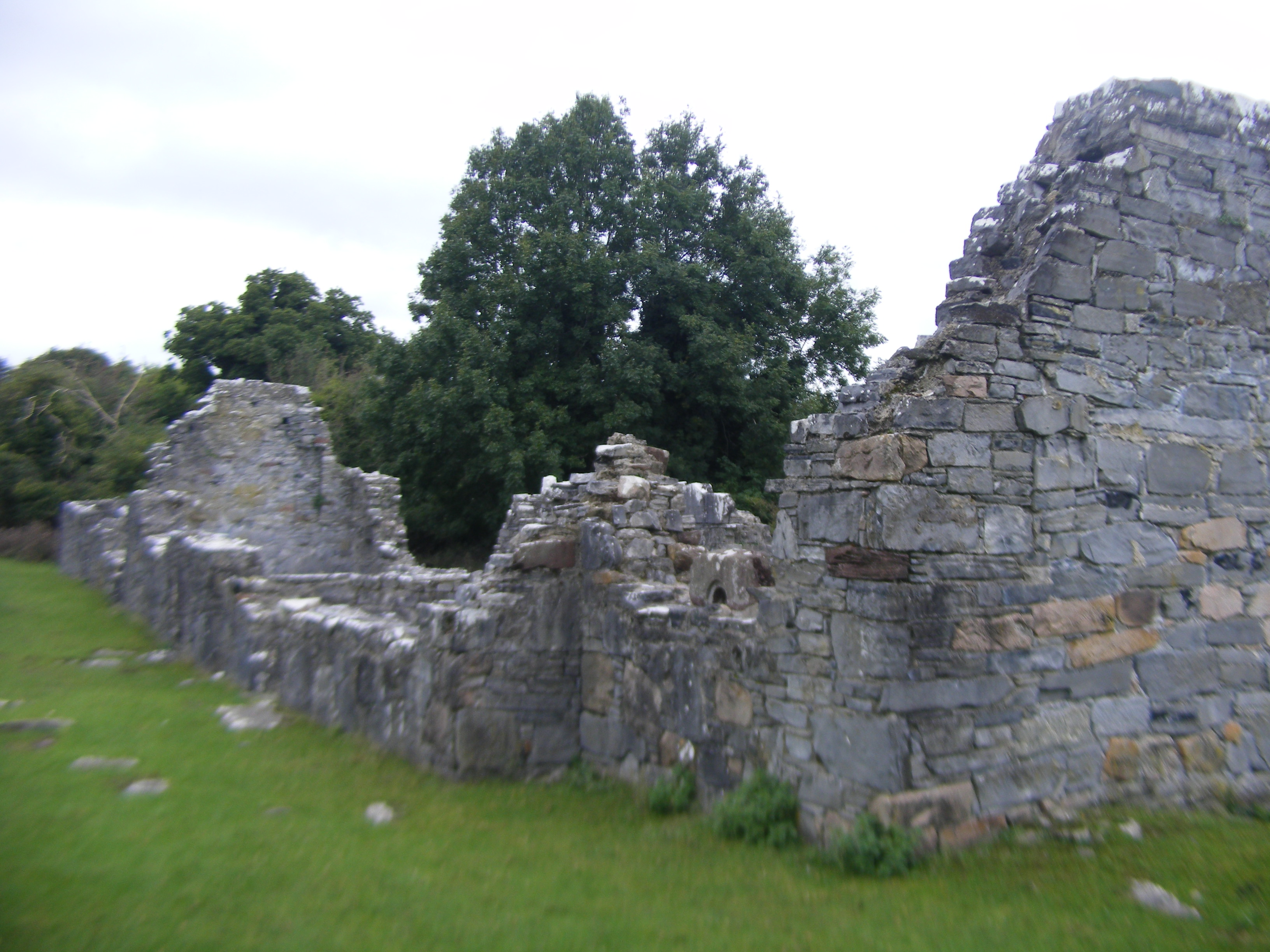
Innisfallen church and abbey wall.JPG

Finan was a native of Corcodhuibhne, most probably the barony of Corkaguiny in County Kerry, the O'Falvy's ancient territory. This is a wild promontory stretching into the Atlantic. As a child he was said to be able to cure his playmates of illness, and had the gift of prophesy. Brendan was Finan's first tutor, and Finan spent seven years with Brendan, who taught him to read and to understand monastic discipline. This probably took place early in the 6th century while Brendan was still living in his native Kerry. (Note: Healy places Finan's tutelage under Brendan early in the 6th century. O'Hanlon states that Finan was probably born around or after the middle of the sixth century. The earlier date, before Brendan's voyages and settlement in Annaghdown, seems more plausible.)

Brendan decided it was wasteful for both himself and Finan to stay in the same place, and Finan agreed to move to a place name Kenetich, later called Kinnitty, in County Offaly, Leinster, where he founded his monastery, perhaps as early as 557, or perhaps much later. (Note: O'Hanlon thought that Finan probably settled at Kinnitty at the close of the sixth century, and considered the earlier date on 557 implausible.) The monastery was on the confines of Éile and of Fearaceall. The parish church of Kinnitty is thought to occupy the site of Finan's old monastery.

Finan seems to have only stayed at Kinnity for a short time before returning to Kerry, where almost all the events recorded in his life took place. For some time Finan lived at or near the Lakes of Killarney. One biography has him living at Lough Leane, near Aghadoe. The ruins of Agahdoe church were old even at the time when the Annals of Inisfallen were written. Many miracles are attributed to the saint. Finan was a contemporary of Saint Mochelloc, who died about 655, when both men were old. Finan therefore probably died in the first half of the 7th century.

== Places ==
Locations in Ireland

John Healy (1890) disputed the common belief that the church and abbey on Innisfallen island in Lough Leane was founded by Finian Lobhar (Finan the Leper), which he considered improbable. It seemed to him much more likely that the Inisfaithlen mentioned in the biographies of Finan the Leper was the island off the coast of County Dublin that is now called by the Danish name of Ireland's Eye. Finan Cam, on the other hand, was born in Kerry of an old family of Kerry, and spent most of his life in the west of Kerry, where many places bear his name.

Around 1750 the remains of Finan's church and cell could be seen on the largest of three small islands in Lough Currane. The local people celebrated the saint's festival on 16 March, the date generally assigned to Finan the Leper, but this is probably due to a confusion of names, because there is no record of Finan the Leper ever going as far to the southwest as Lough Currane. To the south of Lough Currane, Derrynane is derived from Diare Fionain, meaning the oak grove of Finan. However, the old abbey on the sea shore is of medieval origin.

St. Finian's Bay, an exposed stretch of the Atlantic shore north of Bolus Head, is also named after the saint. Finan may well have been the first founder of the oratory on Skellig Michael, directly opposite St. Finian's Bay. In the Viking Age, when the Danes were raiding Ireland the monastery was moved to the mainland, and as of 1890 its dilapidated walls could still be seen in the sheltered corner at the head of St. Finian's Bay.

== Sources ==
- Butler, Alban (1798), The lives of the primitive fathers, martyrs, and other principal saints..., J. Moir This article incorporates text from this source, which is in the public domain.
- Healy, John (1890), Insula Sanctorum Et Doctorum, BoD – Books on Demand, ISBN 978-3-7523-3423-4 This article incorporates text from this source, which is in the public domain.
- O'Hanlon, John (1875), Lives of the Irish saints This article incorporates text from this source, which is in the public domain.
