= Finan of Lindisfarne =

7th-century Bishop of Lindisfarne and saint

- Bishop of Lindisfarne
- Installed: 651
- Term ended: 661
- Predecessor: Aidan
- Successor: Colmán

Personal details
- Born: Ireland
- Died: 17 February 661 Lindisfarne
- Denomination: Christian

Sainthood
- Feast day: 17 February, 9 February

Finan of Lindisfarne (died 10 or 17 February 661), also known as Saint Finan, was an Irish monk, trained at Iona Abbey in Scotland, who became the second bishop of Lindisfarne from 651 until 661.

== Life ==
Finan was appointed to Lindisfarne in 651, to succeed Aidan.

Originally from Ireland, he built on Lindisfarne, a cathedral "in the Irish fashion", employing hewn oak, with a thatched roof. Later Archbishop Theodore of Tarsus dedicated to St. Peter. Finan also founded St. Mary's Priory at the mouth of the River Tyne. He also participated in the founding of Gilling Abbey, established by Queen Eanflæd in memory of her kinsman Oswine of Deira.

He converted the kings Sigebert of Essex and Peada of the Middle Angles to Christianity. Bede is the main source for Finan's life. He is specially noted by Bede as having borne an important part in the conversion of the northern Saxons.

The breviary of Aberdeen styles him "a man of venerable life, a bishop of great sanctity, an eloquent teacher ... remarkable for his training in virtue and his liberal education, surpassing all his equals in every manner of knowledge as well as in circumspection and prudence, but chiefly devoting himself to good works and presenting in his life, a most apt example of virtue". Finan ordained St. Cedd bishop of the East-Saxons, having called two other bishops to assist at his consecration.

The Abbey of Whitby, his chief foundation, was the scene of the Synod of Whitby, which resulted in the withdrawal of the Irish monks from Lindisfarne.

Finan was active for some time at a monastery on Church Island on Lough Currane in County Kerry; today it is known as St. Finan's Church. To the south of the lake is Inis Uasal (Noble Island), an island which is dedicated to him.

Finan died in 661, and was buried at Lindisfarne, having held that see ten years.

== Veneration ==
Finan's feast day is celebrated upon 9 January. He is venerated in the Eastern Orthodox Church, the Scottish Episcopal Church (celebrated on 17 February), and the Roman Catholic Church.

== Citations ==
Christian titles
Preceded by Aidan	Bishop of Lindisfarne; 651–661	Succeeded by Colmán
