= 710s =

Decade

The 710s decade ran from January 1, 710, to December 31, 719.

== Events ==
=== 710 ===
==== By place ====
====== Byzantine Empire ======
- The Byzantine outpost of Cherson (Crimea) rebels (with Khazar assistance) against Emperor Justinian II. He sends a fleet under the patrikios Stephen, which retakes the city and restores Byzantine control. The fleet, however, is struck by a storm on its way back and loses many ships, while the Chersonites, again with the aid of the Khazars, rebel anew.
- The Byzantine general Leo (future emperor Leo III) recovers the Abkhazia (Caucasus) for the Byzantine Empire, from the Arabs.

====== Europe ======
- Roderick becomes king of the Visigoths, but the Visigothic nobles in Septimania rebel, and proclaim the previous ruler's son Akhila king. The Visigothic Kingdom is divided into two sub-kingdoms, suffering the first Muslim raid expedition against the southern Iberian Peninsula.
- An Arab army is invited into Ceuta by its governor, Julian, who is an opponent of Roderick. He encourages them to invade the Iberian Peninsula. Tariq ibn Ziyad is appointed governor of Tangier (Morocco), and establishes a Moorish garrison of 1,700 men.
- Lupus I, duke of Gascony, is assassinated in his attempt to seize Limoges (France). Eudes becomes ruler over both Gascony and Aquitaine.
- The Madara Rider, an early medieval rock relief, is carved on the Madara Plateau east of Shumen in Bulgaria (approximate date).

====== Britain ======
- Kings Ine of Wessex and Nothhelm of Sussex fight against King Geraint of Dumnonia, who dies in battle. Ine's advance brings him control of what is now Devon; he establishes a fortress at Taunton.
- Beorhtfrith fights against the Picts between Haefe and Caere (assumed to be between the rivers Avon and Carron, which flow into the Firth of Forth in Scotland).

====== Africa ======
- Salih I ibn Mansur founds the Muslim Kingdom of Nekor (Morocco). He converts the local Berber tribes to Islam.

====== Asia ======
- April 5 – Emperor Zhong Zong of the Tang dynasty has his chief ministers of court, sons-in-law, and high-ranking military officers engage (during the Cold Food Festival) in the festive game of tug of war, within a palace of Chang'an.
- July 3 – Zhong Zong is assassinated, allegedly poisoned by Empress Wei, who fails to install her daughter Li Guo'er as heir to the throne. Princess Taiping and her nephew Li Longji launch a coup, and restore Rui Zong as emperor.
- The Asuka period, the second and last part of the Yamato period, ends, and the Nara period begins; Heijō-kyō (Nara) becomes the capital of Japan.

==== By topic ====
====== Religion ======
- October 5 – Pope Constantine departs for a year-long visit to Constantinople. He will be the last pontiff to visit the capital for more than a thousand years.
- The first (wooden) Al-Aqsa Mosque is finished.

=== 711 ===
==== By place ====
====== Byzantine Empire ======
- Philippicus incites the inhabitants of Cherson to revolt, with the help of the Khazars. Emperor Justinian II sallies forth from Constantinople to oppose the rebels in the Crimea. Philippicus defeats the Byzantine forces in northern Anatolia, and seizes the capital. He is proclaimed emperor and Justinian is executed, ending the house of Heraclius, that has ruled since 610.
- December – Upon hearing the news of Justinian's death, Anastasia, Justinian's mother, escapes with Justinian's 6-year-old son Tiberius to the sanctuary at the St. Mary's Church (Constantinople). She is pursued by Philippicus' henchmen, who drag the child from the altar and murder him outside the church. It is unknown what became of Justinian's wife, Theodora.

====== Europe ======
- Ansprand, duke of Asti, returns from exile to Italy with a large Bavarian army. Many Austrians (with troops of Venetia) join him in support. King Aripert II, who usurped the throne in 701, is defeated and tries to escape from Pavia to Gaul with his treasury, but drowns in the Ticino River. He is the last Bavarian to wear the Iron Crown (approximate date).
- Peaceful relations between Franks and Frisians are consolidated by the marriage of Pepin of Herstal's son Grimoald to Theudesinda, daughter of King Radbod.
- April 23 – King Childebert III dies after a 16-year reign, and is succeeded by his son Dagobert III as ruler of Austrasia. Pepin of Herstal becomes his regent.

====== Britain ======
- Dux Berhtfrith leads a Northumbrian campaign against the Picts, and defeats them in Manaw Gododdin (modern Scotland) (approximate date).

====== Arabian Empire ======
- April 27 – Umayyad conquest of Hispania: Muslim troops (7,000 men) led by Tariq ibn Ziyad land at Gibraltar, and begin their invasion of the Iberian Peninsula (now Spain and Portugal). Tariq begins his Islamic conquest of the Visigothic Kingdom, which during the decade he occupies and brings under Umayyad sovereignty.
- July 19 – Battle of Guadalete: The Muslim Arabs defeat the Visigothic army (33,000 men) under King Roderick, who dies in battle. The Visigoth capital of Toledo opens its city gates; Tariq ibn Ziyad sends Moorish detachments to capture the cities of Córdoba and Seville (Andalusia).

====== Asia ======
- After pirates plunder an Arab ship near the mouth of the Indus River (Pakistan), Umayyad Arabs under Muhammad ibn Qasim invade India with 10,000 men and 6,000 horses, establishing a sultanate in Sindh. Qasim sends expeditions to Surashtra, where he makes peaceful treaty settlements with the Rashtrakuta.
- Muhammad ibn Qasim captures the fortress city of Multan after a long siege, and raids with his forces the Punjab region, with only light Muslim casualties.

====== Mesoamerica ======
- Palenque is conquered by Tonina.

==== By topic ====
====== Religion ======
- Reconstruction of the Hōryū-ji Temple in Japan is completed (approximate date).

=== 712 ===
==== By place ====
====== Byzantine Empire ======
- The Bulgars under Tervel, ruler (khagan) of the Bulgarian Empire, raid Thrace and reach the city walls of Constantinople. Skirmishes continue until 716; Emperor Philippicus transfers a Byzantine army from the Opsikion Theme in Asia Minor, to police the Balkan Peninsula.

====== Europe ======
- February – King Ansprand dies, and is succeeded by his son Liutprand as ruler of the Lombards. During his reign, Liutprand becomes the greatest of the Lombard Kings. Coins and documents from his court at Pavia confirm the impression of a strong and effective monarch.

====== Arabian Empire ======
- Umayyad conquest of Hispania: From North Africa, Musa ibn Nusayr lands in Iberia (Al-Andalus), with an army of 18,000 Arabs and Berbers. He joins the Islamic conquest and captures the city of Seville (Andalusia), where he meets stiff resistance after 3-months of siege.
- Arab forces under Qutayba ibn Muslim conquer Khwarezm and Samarkand (modern Uzbekistan).

====== Asia ======
- September 8 – Emperor Rui Zong abdicates after a brief reign, in favor of his 27-year-old son Xuan Zong, who ascends the imperial throne of the Tang dynasty (China).
- Xuan Zong reestablishes control over the Oxus and Jaxartes valleys. During his reign he defeats the invading Arab armies, in a series of campaigns in Fergana.
- King Dae Jo-yeong of Balhae (Korea) resumes tributary payments to the Tang dynasty. The Tai peoples are forced to accept Chinese sovereignty (approximate date).

==== By topic ====
====== Literature ======
- The Kojiki (Record of Ancient Times), a history of Japan, is completed.

=== 713 ===
==== By place ====
====== Byzantine Empire ======
- June 3 – Emperor Philippicus is blinded, deposed, and sent into exile by conspirators of the Opsikion army in Thrace, after a reign of 1 year and 6 months. He is succeeded by Anastasios II, a bureaucrat and imperial secretary, who restores internal order and begins the reorganization of the Byzantine army. He executes the officers who have been directly involved in the conspiracy against Philippicus.
- Arab–Byzantine wars: The Umayyad Arabs under al-Abbas ibn al-Walid, son of caliph al-Walid I, sack Antioch in Pisidia (modern Turkey), which never recovers.

====== Britain ======
- King Ealdwulf of East Anglia dies, and is succeeded by his son Ælfwald. Queen Cuthburh of Northumbria travels south to found a monastery at Wimborne (Dorset).

====== Arabian Empire ======
- Umayyad conquest of Hispania: The Visigothic Kingdom is finally defeated at the Battle of Segoyuela (Castile and León). Prince Theudimer signs the Treaty of Orihuela with Abd al-Aziz, governor of Al-Andalus, and is permitted to retain his authority in the area subsequently known as Tudmir. He keeps the citadel of Orihuela and several other settlements, including Alicante and Lorca on the Mediterranean Sea.
- Arab forces under Musa ibn Nusayr conquer the fortress city of Mérida, located on the borders of Andalusia. It becomes part of the Umayyad Emirate of Córdoba.

====== China ======
- Emperor Xuan Zong liquidates the highly lucrative "Inexhaustible Treasury", which is run by a prominent Buddhist monastery in Chang'an. This monastery collects vast amounts of money, silk, and treasures through multitudes of rich people's repentances, left on the premises anonymously. Although the monastery is generous in donations, Xuan Zong issues a decree abolishing their treasury, on the grounds that their banking practices were fraudulent, collects their riches, and distributes the wealth to various other Buddhist monasteries, Daoist abbeys, and to repair statues, halls, and bridges in the city.
- In Chang'an, for the annual Lantern Festival of this year, recently abdicated emperor Rui Zong erects an enormous lantern wheel at a city gate, with a recorded height of 200 ft. The frame is draped in brocades and silk gauze, adorned with gold and jade jewelry, and when its total of some 50,000 oil cups is lit, the radiance of it can be seen for miles.
- Xuan Zong allots the money of 20 million copper coins, and assigns about 1,000 craftsmen to construct a hall at a Buddhist monastery with tons of painted portraits of himself, and of deities, ghosts, etc.
- Xuan Zong wins a power struggle with his sister, Princess Taiping. He executes a large number of her allies and forces her to commit suicide.

==== By topic ====
====== Literature ======
- During the Tang dynasty, Kaiyuan Za Bao ("Bulletin of the Court"), the first newspaper, hand printed on silk, is published (approximate date).

====== Religion ======
- Construction begins on the Leshan Giant Buddha near Leshan, Sichuan Province (China). Upon its completion in 803, it will become the largest stone carved Buddha in the world.

=== 714 ===
==== By place ====
====== Europe ======
- In Septimania, local Visigothic nobles of the anti-Roderick party are offered peace terms similar to those of Prince Theodemir (see 713), and accept Muslim overlordship. Other Visigoths revolt and proclaim Ardo as king. Visigothic refugees gather in the Picos de Europa in the mountains of Asturias.
- December 16 – Pepin II (of Herstal), mayor of the Merovingian palace, dies at Jupille (modern Belgium). His grandson Theudoald (who at age eight was still well into early childhood) becomes the nominal mayor of the palace, while his wife Plectrude holds actual power and imprisons Pepin's illegitimate son Charles Martel.
- Civil War within the Pepinid clan: A revolt erupts between the Neustrian Franks and Frisians. King Radbod forces bishop Willibrord and his Benedictine monks to flee, and advances as far as Cologne (Germany). Frisia (modern-day Netherlands) once again becomes independent.
- Duke Eudes proclaims himself the independent prince of Aquitaine (located north-east of the Garonne River), thereby asserting legal as well as practical independence from the Frankish Kingdom.
- Grimoald the Younger, mayor of the palace of Neustria, is assassinated while on pilgrimage to visit the tomb of Saint Lambert at Liège, on orders of his father-in-law King Radbod.

====== Arabian Empire ======
- Umayyad conquest of Hispania: Continuing campaigns of Muslim domination of the Iberian Peninsula. Arab forces raid the valley of the Ebro River, and capture the fortress city of Zaragoza. Musa ibn Nusayr is made protector (wali) of Al-Andalus, with his capital at Seville (approximate date).
- Tariq ibn Ziyad conquers the cities of Barcelona and Narbonne, where Visigothic nobles accept Umayyad overlordship, in return for autonomy in Septimania (Southern France). Muslims also raid Avignon and Lyon (approximate date).
- Musa ibn Nusayr and Tariq ibn Ziyad are summoned back to Damascus by caliph Al-Walid I. They are ordered to deliver all the spoils of war. Musa complains and is stripped of his rank. Abd al-Aziz, son of Musa, becomes governor of Al-Andalus (modern Spain).
- Al-Hajjaj ibn Yusuf, governor of Mesopotamia, dies at Wasit (Iraq) after a 20-year administration. He is credited for improving agricultural production and introducing the diacritic points to the Arabic script. Al-Hajjaj convinces Al-Walid I to adopt an Arab currency.

====== China ======
- Emperor Xuan Zong forbids all commercial vendors and shops in the Chinese capital city of Chang'an to copy and sell Buddhist sutras, so that the emperor can give the clergy of the Buddhist monasteries the sole right to distribute written sutras to the laity.
- Summer – Xuan Zong makes his general Xue Ne de facto chancellor and commissions him, with a Chinese army (60,000 men), to attack the Khitans (Mongolia). Xue falls into a Khitan trap and the Tang forces are crushed, at an 80-90% casualty rate.
- Fall – Xue Ne repels a Tibetan invasion of the Lan Prefecture (modern Lanzhou). Xuan Zong creates Li Ying, his second son, crown prince of the Tang dynasty.

==== By topic ====
====== Religion ======
- Rupert, bishop of Salzburg, founds Nonnberg Abbey in modern-day Austria.

=== 715 ===
==== By place ====
====== Byzantine Empire ======
- May – Emperor Anastasios II is deposed in an army mutiny, and succeeded by Theodosius III, a tax-collector from the theme of Opsikion (modern Turkey). After a six-month siege, Theodosius and his troops take Constantinople; Anastasios is forced to abdicate the throne, and retires to a monastery in Thessaloniki (Macedonia).

====== Europe ======
- September 26 – Battle of Compiègne: Ragenfrid, mayor of the palace of Neustria and Burgundy (appointed by King Dagobert III), defeats Theudoald in the first battle of the Frankish civil war, following the death of Pepin II (of Herstal).
- Dagobert III dies of an illness and is succeeded by Chilperic II, son of Childeric II, as king of Neustria. Charles Martel is freed from prison at Cologne, and is proclaimed Mayor of the Palace of Austrasia at the capital Metz.

====== Britain ======
- Battle of Woden's Burg: Kings Ine of Wessex and Ceolred of Mercia clash at Woden's Burg (Wiltshire).
- King Nechtan mac Der-Ilei invites the Northumbrian clergy to establish Christianity amongst the Picts.

====== Arabian Empire ======
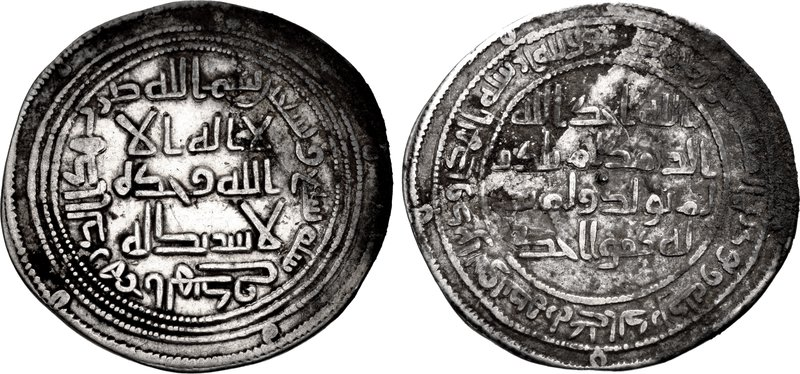
Dirham of the Umayyad caliph Sulayman (r. 715–717)

- February 23 – Caliph Al-Walid I dies at Damascus after a 10-year reign, and is succeeded by his brother Sulayman ibn Abd al-Malik. During his rule the Umayyad Caliphate reaches its greatest height, with successful campaigns undertaken in Transoxiana (Central Asia), Sindh (Pakistan), Hispania and against the Byzantine Empire.
- Umayyad conquest of Hispania: Arabs led by Tariq ibn Ziyad advance from the area La Rioja (modern-day Spain), and conquer the fortress city of León.

====== Japan ======
- Empress Genmei abdicates the throne after an 8-year reign, in which she has built a replica of the Chinese imperial palace at Japan's new capital, Nara. Genmei is succeeded by her daughter Genshō.

==== By topic ====
====== Religion ======
- April 9 – Pope Constantine I dies at Rome after a 7-year reign. He is succeeded by Gregory II as the 89th pope of the Catholic Church.
- Winning, an Irish monk, lands at the mouth of the River Garnock in Scotland, and establishes a community or cell of monks (termed cella or "Kil" in Gaelic).
- The newly-appointed Patriarch Germanus I of Constantinople organises a council propagating Dyothelitism, and attempts to improve relations with the Armenian Apostolic Church.
- Approximate date – Tewkesbury Abbey is founded on the site of an ancient hermitage in England, by the noble brothers Oddo and Doddo.

=== 716 ===
==== Byzantine Empire ====
- Arab-Byzantine Wars: Umayyad Caliph Sulayman ibn Abd Al-Malik begins the preparations for his campaign on Constantinople; he orders new ships be built in the port-cities in Palestine, Egypt & Ifriqiya. General Umar ibn Hubayra raids southern Anatolia by sea and conquers Lycia, where another Arab fleet joins him, and they spend winter. As the navy advances, Sulayman sends land armies into Anatolia, which settle at Caesarea.
- Emperor Theodosios III concludes a peace treaty with Kormesiy, son of Tervel of Bulgaria, in an effort to secure support against the Arab invasion in Anatolia (modern Turkey). The treaty recognizes the Bulgarian borders, including the newly gained lands of Zagore (see 705). Theodosios agrees to pay annual tribute, and exchange refugees charged with conspiracy against the legal ruler. Goods can only be imported or exported with a state seal. Bulgarian merchants gain official access to the trade market in Constantinople.

====== Europe ======
- Battle of Cologne: Charles Martel, mayor of the palace of Austrasia, is defeated by the Neustrians under King Chilperic II and his mayor Ragenfrid near Cologne (now part of Germany), who have invaded Austrasia to impose their will on the competing Frankish factions of Theudoald and Plectrude, the child grandson (and designated heir) and widow respectively of Pepin of Herstal. Simultaneously, Radbod, king (or duke) of the Frisians, attacks Austrasia and allies with the Neustrians. Charles is forced to flee into the mountains of the Eifel (Ardennes).
- Battle of Amblève: Charles Martel defeats his Neustrian and Frisian rivals near Amel (modern-day Belgium). His forces attack the army of Chilperic II and his allies, as they return triumphantly from Cologne. According to the Annals of Metz, Charles uses a feigned retreat to destroy his foes while they are resting, and recovers much of the ransom paid by Plectrude to Chilperic. He will remain undefeated until his death 25 years later.

====== Britain ======
- Prince Æthelbald returns from Crowland Fens to Mercia, and seizes the throne after the death of his cousin King Ceolred, who had driven him into exile (see 709). He gains hegemony over London, Essex, and all of the English Midlands. By 731, Æthelbald will have subjugated all provinces south of the Humber River under his overlordship.
- King Osred I of Northumbria is killed in battle, possibly by the Picts in Manau Gododdin (Scotland). He is succeeded by his distant cousin, Coenred.

====== Arabian Empire ======
- Abd al-Aziz ibn Musa, governor of Al-Andalus (modern Spain), is assassinated on order of Caliph Sulayman ibn Abd al-Malik. He is succeeded by his cousin Ayyub ibn Habib al-Lakhmi, who becomes interim "protector" (wali) for 6 months, and moves the capital to Córdoba, until replaced by Al-Hurr ibn Abd al-Rahman al-Thaqafi.

====== Asia ======
- Qapaghan Khan, ruler (khagan) of the Second Turkic Khaganate (Central Asia), is killed during a campaign against his rival Toquz Oghuz. His severed head is sent to Chang'an, capital of the Tang dynasty. Qapaghan is succeeded by his son Inel Khagan.

==== By topic ====
====== Religion ======
- Boniface, Anglo-Saxon missionary, leaves England and travels to Frisia (the western parts of the modern-day Netherlands) to assist Willibrord, bishop of Utrecht, in his work to convert the pagan Frisians.

=== 717 ===
==== By place ====
====== Byzantine Empire ======
- March 25 – Emperor Theodosios III is deposed after a reign of 1 year and 10 months. He is succeeded by the 32-year-old Leo III the Isaurian, a general (strategos) of the Anatolic Theme (modern Turkey). Theodosios and his son enter the clergy, and he probably becomes bishop of Ephesus. Leo brings an end to the Twenty Years' Anarchy in the Byzantine Empire, which marks the beginning of the so-called Isaurian Dynasty.
- Arab–Byzantine War: Muslim general Maslama ibn Abd al-Malik leads his army of 80,000 men from Pergamum to Abydos, where he crosses the Hellespont. To prevent interference by the Bulgars, or by any Byzantine forces in Thrace, he sends part of his army to a covering position near Adrianople; with his main body, Maslama builds siege lines to blockade Constantinople, which is protected by the massive Theodosian Walls.
- August 15 – Siege of Constantinople: Maslama begins a combined land and sea effort to capture Constantinople. The capital controls the Bosporus, access between the Mediterranean and Black Sea, and is defended by a garrison of roughly 25,000 men. Leo III orders the granaries be restocked and siege engines installed. The Arab besiegers are suffering immense losses due to disease, and from attrition of siege warfare.
- September 1 – A Muslim armada, consisting of 1,800 ships commanded by Admiral Suleiman, sails into the Sea of Marmara and drops anchor below the sea walls of Constantinople, to supply their forces ashore. Leo III orders the Byzantine fleet to sally forth from their protected harbors with Greek fire, setting alight the thickly-packed Muslim ships. Many vessels burst into flames, while others collide with each other before sinking.
- Fall – Basil Onomagoulos, Byzantine official, declares himself rival emperor in Sicily after the news arrives that Constantinople has fallen to an Arab siege. Leo III dispatches a chartoularios named Paul, with imperial instructions for the Byzantine army on the island. Basil is arrested and executed; his head is sent to Leo, while the other rebels are mutilated and exiled.

====== Western Europe ======
- March 21 – Battle of Vincy: Charles Martel invades Neustria and defeats the forces of King Chilperic II at Vincy, near Cambrai. He pursues him and his mayor of the palace Ragenfrid to Paris, before turning back to deal with his stepmother Plectrude at Cologne, to turn over half the wealth of his late father Pepin of Herstal. Charles allows both Plectrude and his nephew Theudoald (who at eleven was still a little child) to live (a gesture uncommon for the time), and obliges her to accept his sovereignty.
- Charles Martel consolidates his power, proclaims Clotaire IV king of Austrasia in opposition to Chilperic, and deposes Rigobert, bishop of Reims, replacing him with Milo. He marches against Radbod, king (or duke) of the Frisians, and pushes him back into his territory (later part of the Netherlands). Charles sends the Saxons back over the Weser River, and secures the Rhine border—in the name of Clotaire.
- Paolo Lucio Anafesto dies after a 20-year reign, and is succeeded by Marcello Tegalliano as the second doge of the Republic of Venice.

====== Arabian Empire ======
- Caliph Sulayman ibn Abd al-Malik dies after a 2-year reign, and is succeeded by his cousin Umar II. During his rule he grants tax exemption, and tries to reorganize the Umayyad finances.
- A Muslim expedition under Al-Hurr ibn Abd al-Rahman al-Thaqafi cross the Pyrenees into Aquitanian territory, leading a small raiding party into Septimania (Southern France).

====== Asia ======
- December 24 – A destructive earthquake, with six months of aftershocks, affects Syria and Mesopotamia.
- Hoshi Ryokan, the world's second-longest surviving hotel, is established in Japan (approximate date).

==== By topic ====
====== Religion ======
- Nechtan mac Der-Ilei, king of the Picts, expels the monks from the island of Iona (Scotland).

=== 718 ===
==== By place ====
====== Byzantine Empire ======
- Spring – A Muslim supply fleet of 760 ships under Sufyan arrives from Egypt and North Africa, concealing itself along the Asiatic shore. The Byzantines learn of the fleet's location from defecting Christian Egyptian sailors. Emperor Leo III sends the Byzantine navy again; his Greek fire ships destroy the enemy vessels in the Sea of Marmara and seize their supplies on shore, denying the sieging army vital provisions. On land the Byzantine troops ambush an advancing Arab army, and destroy it in the hills around Sophon, south of Nicomedia (modern Turkey). The Arab besiegers are still suffering from hunger and pestilence.
- August 15 – Siege of Constantinople: A Bulgar relief force attacks the siege lines at Constantinople, on the west side of the Bosporus. Contemporary chroniclers report that at least 22,000–32,000 Arabs are killed during the Bulgarian attacks. Caliph Umar II is forced to lift the siege after 13 months; the Muslim army attempts to withdraw back through Anatolia, while the rest escapes by sea in the remaining vessels. The Arab fleet suffers further casualties to storms, and an eruption of the volcano of Thera. According to Arab sources 150,000 Muslims perish during the campaign.

====== Western Europe ======
- Battle of Soissons: King Chilperic II of Neustria and his mayor of the palace Ragenfrid, allied with Eudes, independent duke of Aquitaine, march on Soissons in Picardy (northern France) but an army of Frankish veterans under Charles Martel defeat the Neustrian allies, who sue for peace. Chilperic flees to the land south of the River Loire and Ragenfrid escapes to Angers. Charles diplomatically chooses not to execute the enemy leaders, and becomes undisputed dux Francorum, ending the Frankish civil war.
- Summer – Battle of Covadonga: Pelagius (Don Pelayo) is proclaimed king (caudillo), and defeats the Umayyad forces under Munuza, provincial governor of Asturias, at Picos de Europa (near Covadonga). This marks the beginning of the Reconquista, the Christian reconquest of the Iberian Peninsula. He founds the Kingdom of Asturias, and establishes a military base at Cangas de Onís (northwest of Spain) (or 722).
- King Liutprand of the Lombards builds a close alliance with Charles Martel, and attacks the Bavarian castles on the River Adige, maintaining strategic control of the Alpine passes in the Italian Alps (approximate date).

====== Britain ======
- King Coenred of Northumbria dies after a 2-year reign. The throne is seized by Osric, probably a younger brother, or half-brother, of the late king Osred I.
- Former queen Cuthburh of Northumbria, abbess of Wimborne, dies at her abbey and is buried there (approximate date).

==== By topic ====
====== Religion ======
- The Wessex-born missionary Boniface sets out for Frisia a second time. He travels to Rome, where Pope Gregory II sends him on a mission to convert the Saxons in Lower Saxony (modern-day Germany).
- Hugh of Champagne, cousin of Charles Martel, enters the monastery of Jumièges (Normandy), and embraces the religious life as abbot.

=== 719 ===
==== By place ====
====== Byzantine Empire ======
- Ex-Emperor Anastasios II starts a revolt against Leo III with considerable support, including auxiliaries provided by Tervel, emperor (khagan) of the Bulgarian Empire. His attack on Constantinople fails; Anastasios is captured and is put to death (by beheading), on the orders of Leo.

====== Europe ======
- Umayyad conquest of Gaul (first major Muslim attack upon Visigothic Septimania, in southern France): Governor Al-Samh takes or re-takes Narbonne (Arbouna for the Arabs), before raiding the Toulouse area. Many town defenders and inhabitants are killed in the aftermath by the Umayyad forces.
- Frisian–Frankish War: Charles Martel defeats Redbad, King of the Frisians. He easily invades Frisia (modern Netherlands) and subjugates the territory. Charles also crosses the Rhine and annexes "farther" Frisia, to the banks of the River Vlie.
- Duke Grimoald becomes sole ruler of Bavaria, after the deaths of his brothers Theodbert, Theobald, and Tassilo II. He reunites the duchy after a civil war, and makes his capital Salzburg (approximate date).
- May – Chilperic II is raised on the shield after the death of Chlothar IV, and recognized by Charles Martel as king (roi fainéant) of the Franks. Charles, however, gains a monopoly on power and royal offices.

==== By topic ====
====== Religion ======
- The Church of Nubia transfers its allegiance, from the Eastern Orthodox Church to the Coptic Church (approximate date).

== Significant people ==
- Al-Walid I
- Sulayman ibn Abd al-Malik
- Umar ibn Abd al-Aziz
- Theodosius III

== Births ==
710

- Fulrad, Frankish abbot (d. 784)
- Hnabi, duke of the Alemanni (approximate date)
- Leoba, Anglo-Saxon nun (approximate date)
- Lullus, archbishop of Mainz (approximate date)
- Walpurga, Anglo-Saxon missionary (d. 779)

711

- Malik ibn Anas, Arab scholar (approximate date)
- Su Zong, emperor of the Tang dynasty (d. 762)

712

- Abdallah ibn Ali, Muslim general (approximate date)
- Du Fu, Chinese poet (d. 770)
- Rupert of Bingen, patron saint (d. 732)

713

- Carloman, mayor of the palace (approximate date)
- Stephen the Younger, Byzantine theologian (or 715)
- Zhang Xuan, Chinese painter (d. 755)

714

- Al-Mansur, Muslim caliph (d. 775)
- Fujiwara no Nagate, Japanese nobleman (d. 771)
- Pepin the Short, king of the Franks (d. 768)

715

- Fujiwara no Matate, Japanese nobleman (d. 766)
- Stephen II, pope of the Catholic Church (d. 757)
- Stephen the Younger, Byzantine theologian (or 713)

716

- Carloman, Frankish mayor of the palace (approximate date)
- Fujiwara no Kiyonari, Japanese nobleman (d. 777)
- Fujiwara no Yoshitsugu, Japanese statesman (d. 777)
- Hiltrud, duchess regent of Bavaria (approximate date; d. 754)
- Sufyan al-Thawri, Muslim scholar and jurist (d. 778)

717

- Childeric III, king of the Franks (d. 754)
- Elipando, Spanish archbishop and theologian
- Gummarus, Frankish noblemen (d. 774)
- Princess Inoe of Japan (d. 775)
- Rabia Basri, Muslim Sufi mystic and saint (d. 801)

718

- Constantine V, Byzantine emperor (d. 775)
- Kōken, empress of Japan (d. 770)
- Niall Frossach, High King of Ireland (d. 778)
- Ōtomo no Yakamochi, Japanese statesman and poet, Shōgun (d. 785)

719

- Guan Bo, chancellor of the Tang Dynasty (d. 797)
- Isma'il ibn Jafar, Shī‘ah Imām and scholar (or 722)
- Yang Guifei, concubine of Xuan Zong (d. 756)

== Deaths ==
710

- January 9 – Adrian of Canterbury, abbot and scholar
- March 27 – Rupert, bishop of Salzburg
- June 30 – Erentrude, Frankish abbess
- July 3 – Zhong Zong, emperor of the Tang dynasty (b. 656)
- July 21
  - Li Guo'er, princess of the Tang dynasty
  - Shangguan Wan'er, Chinese poet (b. 664)
  - Empress Wei, empress of the Tang dynasty
- September 10 – Li Chongfu, imperial prince of the Chinese Tang dynasty (b. c. 680)
- Al-Akhtal, Arab poet
- Arikesari Maravarman, king of the Pandyan Empire (India)
- Bahram VII, son of Yazdegerd III
- Congal Cennmagair, High King of Ireland
- Emebert, bishop of Cambrai
- Geraint, king of Dumnonia (England)
- Giles, Frankish abbot (approximate date)
- Kakinomoto no Hitomaro, Japanese poet
- Lupus I, duke of Gascony
- Wilfred, Anglo-Saxon bishop (or 709)
- Wittiza, king of the Visigoths (approximate date)

711

- April 23 – Childebert III, king of the Franks
- November 4 – Justinian II, Byzantine emperor (b. 669)
- December – Tiberius, son of Justinian II (b. 705)
- Seachnasach, king of Uí Maine (Ireland)
- Aripert II, king of the Lombards (or 712)
- Kʼinich Kʼan Joy Chitam II, ruler of Palenque (or c. 721)
- Roderic, king of the Visigoths (or 712)

712

- Ali ibn Husayn, fourth Shia Imam
- Anas ibn Malik, well known sahaba. (b. 611 or 612)
- Ansprand, king of the Lombards
- Aripert II, king of the Lombards (or 711)
- Bran ua Máele Dúin, king of the Uí Ceinnselaig (Ireland)
- Cú Cherca mac Fáeláin, king of Osraige (Ireland)
- Fazang, Chinese Buddhist patriarch (b. 643)
- Idwal Iwrch, king of Gwynedd (Wales)
- Khri ma lod, empress of the Tibetan Empire
- Vindicianus, bishop of Cambrai (approximate date)

713

- Ali ibn Husayn, fourth Shia Imam and great-grandson of Muhammad
- Ealdwulf, king of East Anglia
- Huineng, Chinese Zen Buddhist patriarch (b. 638)
- Li Jiao, chancellor of the Tang dynasty (b. 644)
- Philippicus, Byzantine emperor
- Taiping, princess of the Tang dynasty
- Suitbert, Anglo-Saxon missionary bishop
- Ursmar, Frankish abbot and missionary bishop
- Yijing, Chinese Buddhist monk and traveler (b. 635)

714

- September 5 – Shang, emperor of the Tang dynasty
- December 16 – Pepin of Herstal, Mayor of the Palace
- Achila II, king of the Visigoths (approximate date)
- Al-Hajjaj ibn Yusuf, Arab governor (b. 661)
- Grimoald the Younger, Mayor of the Palace
- Guthlac of Crowland, Anglo-Saxon hermit
- Sa'id ibn Jubayr, Muslim scholar (b. 665)

715

- February 23 – Al-Walid I, Muslim caliph (b. 668)
- April 9 – Constantine I, Pope of Rome (b. 664)
- July 9 – Naga, Japanese prince
- Dagobert III, king of the Franks (b. 699)
- Milburga, Anglo-Saxon abbess (approximate date)
- Muhammad ibn Qasim, Arab general (b. 695)
- Surya Devi, Indian princess
- Muhammad ibn Yusuf al-Thaqafi, Arab governor
- Qutayba ibn Muslim, Arab general (b. 669)

716

- July 13 – Rui Zong, emperor of the Tang dynasty (b. 662)
- Abd al-Aziz ibn Musa, Arab general (or 718)
- Ceolfrith, Anglo-Saxon abbot
- Ceolred, king of Mercia
- Coenred, king of Mercia
- Musa ibn Nusayr, Arab general (b. 640)
- Osred I, king of Northumbria
- Qapaghan Khan, ruler (khagan) of the Turkic Khaganate
- Theodo II, duke of Bavaria (approximate date)
- Winnoc, Welsh abbot (or 717)

717

- December 30 – Egwin of Evesham, bishop of Worcester
- Basil Onomagoulos, Byzantine usurper
- Eadwulf I, king of Northumbria
- Isonokami no Maro, Japanese statesman (b. 640)
- Paolo Lucio Anafesto, doge of Venice
- Plectrude, consort of Pepin of Herstal
- Sulayman ibn Abd al-Malik, Muslim caliph (b. 674)
- Theobald, duke of Bavaria (or 719)
- Winnoc, Welsh abbot (or 716)

718

- Coenred, king of Northumbria
- Cuthburh, Anglo-Saxon abbess (approximate date)
- Plectrude, Neustrian regent

719

- Anastasios II, Byzantine emperor
- Chlothar IV, king of Austrasia (approximate date)
- Dae Jo-yeong, king of Balhae
- Muhammad ibn Marwan, Arab general (or 720)
- Pega, Anglo-Saxon anchoress
- Radbod, king of the Frisians
- Tassilo II, duke of Bavaria (approximate date)
- Theobald, duke of Bavaria (or 717)
- Theodbert, duke of Bavaria (approximate date)
