= 718 =

Calendar year

718 in various calendars
- Gregorian calendar: 718; DCCXVIII
- Ab urbe condita: 1471
- Armenian calendar: 167; ԹՎ ՃԿԷ
- Assyrian calendar: 5468
- Balinese saka calendar: 639–640
- Bengali calendar: 124–125
- Berber calendar: 1668
- Buddhist calendar: 1262
- Burmese calendar: 80
- Byzantine calendar: 6226–6227
- Chinese calendar: 丁巳年 (Fire Snake); 3415 or 3208 — to — 戊午年 (Earth Horse); 3416 or 3209
- Coptic calendar: 434–435
- Discordian calendar: 1884
- Ethiopian calendar: 710–711
- Hebrew calendar: 4478–4479
- Hindu calendars
- Vikram Samvat: 774–775
- Shaka Samvat: 639–640
- Kali Yuga: 3818–3819
- Holocene calendar: 10718
- Iranian calendar: 96–97
- Islamic calendar: 99–100
- Japanese calendar: Yōrō 2 (養老２年)
- Javanese calendar: 611–612
- Julian calendar: 718; DCCXVIII
- Korean calendar: 3051
- Minguo calendar: 1194 before ROC 民前1194年
- Nanakshahi calendar: −750
- Seleucid era: 1029/1030 AG
- Thai solar calendar: 1260–1261
- Tibetan calendar: མེ་མོ་སྦྲུལ་ལོ་ (female Fire-Snake); 844 or 463 or −309 — to — ས་ཕོ་རྟ་ལོ་ (male Earth-Horse); 845 or 464 or −308

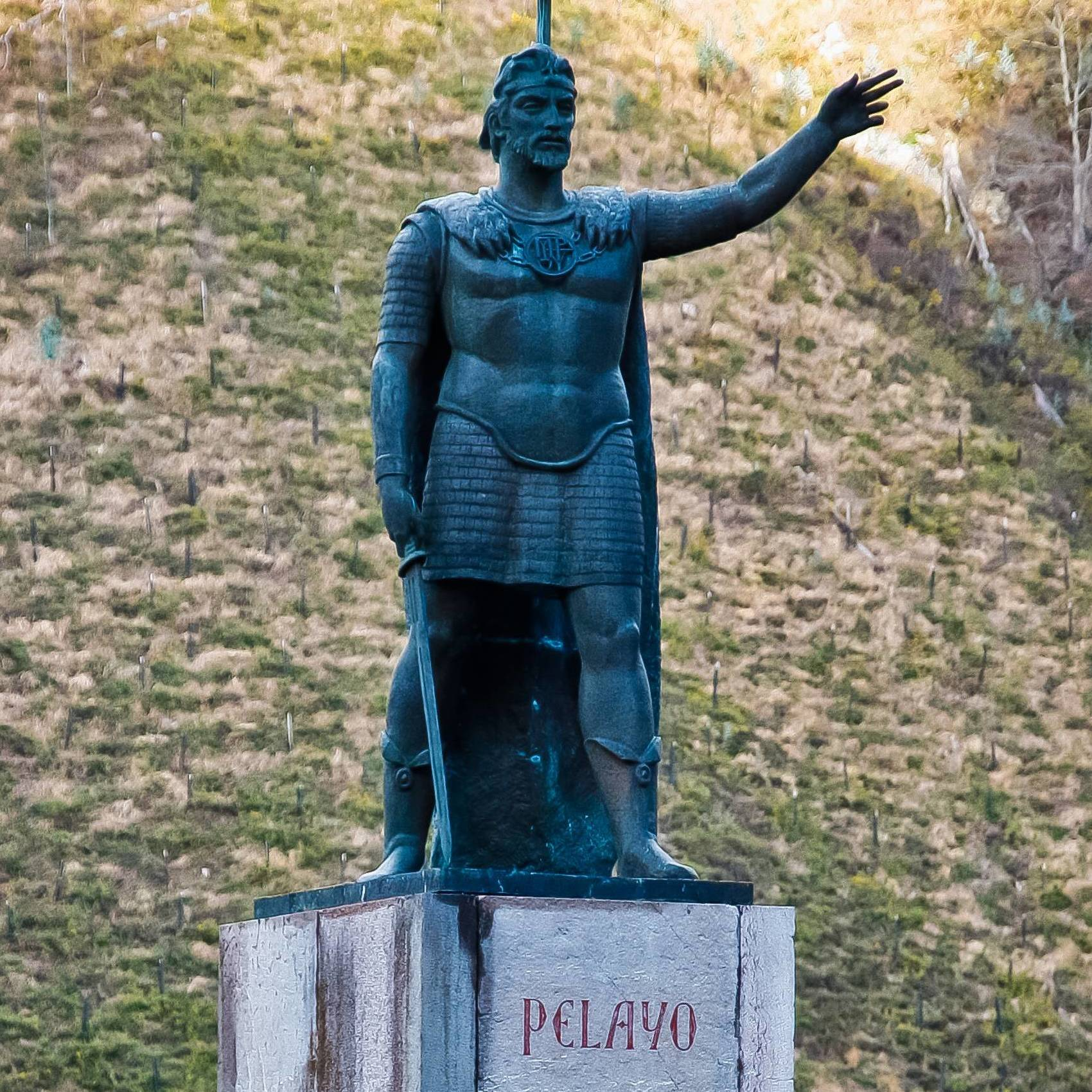
King Pelagius (Don Pelayo) (c. 685–737)

Year 718 (DCCXVIII) was a common year starting on Saturday of the Julian calendar, the 718th year of the Common Era (CE) and Anno Domini (AD) designations, the 718th year of the 1st millennium, the 18th year of the 8th century, and the 9th year of the 710s decade. The denomination 718 for this year has been used since the early medieval period, when the Anno Domini calendar era became the prevalent method in Europe for naming years.

== Events ==
=== By place ===
==== Byzantine Empire ====
- Spring – A Muslim supply fleet of 760 ships under Sufyan arrives from Egypt and North Africa, concealing itself along the Asiatic shore. The Byzantines learn of the fleet's location from defecting Christian Egyptian sailors. Emperor Leo III sends the Byzantine navy again; his Greek fire ships destroy the enemy vessels in the Sea of Marmara and seize their supplies on shore, denying the sieging army vital provisions. On land the Byzantine troops ambush an advancing Arab army, and destroy it in the hills around Sophon, south of Nicomedia (modern Turkey). The Arab besiegers are still suffering from hunger and pestilence.
- August 15 – Siege of Constantinople: A Bulgar relief force attacks the siege lines at Constantinople, on the west side of the Bosporus. Contemporary chroniclers report that at least 22,000–32,000 Arabs are killed during the Bulgarian attacks. Caliph Umar II is forced to lift the siege after 13 months; the Muslim army attempts to withdraw back through Anatolia, while the rest escapes by sea in the remaining vessels. The Arab fleet suffers further casualties to storms, and an eruption of the volcano of Thera. According to Arab sources 150,000 Muslims perish during the campaign.

==== Western Europe ====
- Battle of Soissons: King Chilperic II of Neustria and his mayor of the palace Ragenfrid, allied with Eudes, independent duke of Aquitaine, march on Soissons in Picardy (northern France) but an army of Frankish veterans under Charles Martel defeat the Neustrian allies, who sue for peace. Chilperic flees to the land south of the River Loire and Ragenfrid escapes to Angers. Charles diplomatically chooses not to execute the enemy leaders, and becomes undisputed dux Francorum, ending the Frankish civil war.
- Summer – Battle of Covadonga: Pelagius (Don Pelayo) is proclaimed king (caudillo), and defeats the Umayyad forces under Munuza, provincial governor of Asturias, at Picos de Europa (near Covadonga). This marks the beginning of the Reconquista, the Christian reconquest of the Iberian Peninsula. He founds the Kingdom of Asturias, and establishes a military base at Cangas de Onís (northwest of Spain) (or 722).
- King Liutprand of the Lombards builds a close alliance with Charles Martel, and attacks the Bavarian castles on the River Adige, maintaining strategic control of the Alpine passes in the Italian Alps (approximate date).

==== Britain ====
- King Coenred of Northumbria dies after a 2-year reign. The throne is seized by Osric, probably a younger brother, or half-brother, of the late king Osred I.
- Former queen Cuthburh of Northumbria, abbess of Wimborne, dies at her abbey and is buried there (approximate date).

=== By topic ===
==== Religion ====
- The Wessex-born missionary Boniface sets out for Frisia a second time. He travels to Rome, where Pope Gregory II sends him on a mission to convert the Saxons in Lower Saxony (modern-day Germany).
- Hugh of Champagne, cousin of Charles Martel, enters the monastery of Jumièges (Normandy), and embraces the religious life as abbot.

== Births ==
- Abu Muslim Khorasani, Muslim general (earliest estimated date; d. 755)
- Constantine V, Byzantine emperor (d. 775)
- Kōken, empress of Japan (d. 770)
- Niall Frossach, High King of Ireland (d. 778)
- Ōtomo no Yakamochi, Japanese statesman and poet, Shōgun (d. 785)

== Deaths ==
- Coenred, king of Northumbria
- Cuthburh, Anglo-Saxon abbess (approximate date)
- Plectrude, Neustrian regent
