= 719 =

Calendar year

719 in various calendars
- Gregorian calendar: 719; DCCXIX
- Ab urbe condita: 1472
- Armenian calendar: 168; ԹՎ ՃԿԸ
- Assyrian calendar: 5469
- Balinese saka calendar: 640–641
- Bengali calendar: 125–126
- Berber calendar: 1669
- Buddhist calendar: 1263
- Burmese calendar: 81
- Byzantine calendar: 6227–6228
- Chinese calendar: 戊午年 (Earth Horse); 3416 or 3209 — to — 己未年 (Earth Goat); 3417 or 3210
- Coptic calendar: 435–436
- Discordian calendar: 1885
- Ethiopian calendar: 711–712
- Hebrew calendar: 4479–4480
- Hindu calendars
- Vikram Samvat: 775–776
- Shaka Samvat: 640–641
- Kali Yuga: 3819–3820
- Holocene calendar: 10719
- Iranian calendar: 97–98
- Islamic calendar: 100–101
- Japanese calendar: Yōrō 3 (養老３年)
- Javanese calendar: 612–613
- Julian calendar: 719; DCCXIX
- Korean calendar: 3052
- Minguo calendar: 1193 before ROC 民前1193年
- Nanakshahi calendar: −749
- Seleucid era: 1030/1031 AG
- Thai solar calendar: 1261–1262
- Tibetan calendar: ས་ཕོ་རྟ་ལོ་ (male Earth-Horse); 845 or 464 or −308 — to — ས་མོ་ལུག་ལོ་ (female Earth-Sheep); 846 or 465 or −307

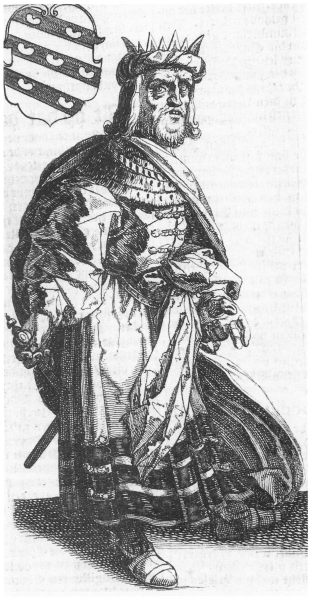
King (or duke) Radbod of the Frisians

Year 719 (DCCXIX) was a common year starting on Sunday of the Julian calendar, the 719th year of the Common Era (CE) and Anno Domini (AD) designations, the 719th year of the 1st millennium, the 19th year of the 8th century, and the 10th and last year of the 710s decade. The denomination 719 for this year has been used since the early medieval period, when the Anno Domini calendar era became the prevalent method in Europe for naming years.

== Events ==
=== By place ===
==== Byzantine Empire ====
- Ex-Emperor Anastasios II starts a revolt against Leo III with considerable support, including auxiliaries provided by Tervel, emperor (khagan) of the Bulgarian Empire. His attack on Constantinople fails; Anastasios is captured and is put to death (by beheading), on the orders of Leo.

==== Europe ====
- Umayyad conquest of Gaul (first major Muslim attack upon Visigothic Septimania, in southern France): Governor Al-Samh takes or re-takes Narbonne (Arbouna for the Arabs), before raiding the Toulouse area. Many town defenders and inhabitants are killed in the aftermath by the Umayyad forces.
- Frisian–Frankish War: Charles Martel defeats Redbad, King of the Frisians. He easily invades Frisia (modern Netherlands) and subjugates the territory. Charles also crosses the Rhine and annexes "farther" Frisia, to the banks of the River Vlie.
- Duke Grimoald becomes sole ruler of Bavaria, after the deaths of his brothers Theodbert, Theobald, and Tassilo II. He reunites the duchy after a civil war, and makes his capital Salzburg (approximate date).
- May – Chilperic II is raised on the shield after the death of Chlothar IV, and recognized by Charles Martel as king (roi fainéant) of the Franks. Charles, however, gains a monopoly on power and royal offices.

=== By topic ===
==== Religion ====
- The Church of Nubia transfers its allegiance, from the Eastern Orthodox Church to the Coptic Church (approximate date).

== Births ==
- Guan Bo, chancellor of the Tang Dynasty (d. 797)
- Isma'il ibn Jafar, Shī‘ah Imām and scholar (or 722)
- Yang Guifei, concubine of Xuan Zong (d. 756)

== Deaths ==
- Anastasios II, Byzantine emperor
- Chlothar IV, king of Austrasia (approximate date)
- Dae Jo-yeong, king of Balhae
- Muhammad ibn Marwan, Arab general (or 720)
- Pega, Anglo-Saxon anchoress
- Radbod, king of the Frisians
- Tassilo II, duke of Bavaria (approximate date)
- Theobald, duke of Bavaria (or 717)
- Theodbert, duke of Bavaria (approximate date)
