= Battle of Soissons (718) =

Battle in 718

Coordinates: 49°22′54″N 3°19′25″E

The Battle of Soissons of 718 CE was the last of the great pitched battles of the civil war between the heirs of Pepin of Herstal. Since Pepin's death in December 714, his grandson and heir Theudoald, his widow Plectrude, his possibly illegitimate son Charles Martel, his successor as mayor of the palace in Neustria Ragenfrid, and the new king Chilperic II had been waging a war for ascendancy. Though Ragenfrid and Chilperic had begun with successes and Plectrude and Theudoald were removed early, Martel turned the tide of war and eventually forced the surrender of all his opponents.

After their defeat at the Battle of Vincy, Chilperic and Ragenfrid allied with Odo the Great, the independent duke of Aquitaine, and marched on Soissons. Charles had anticipated this and was awaiting them with an ever better trained core of veterans, many of whom would serve him all their adult lives. That army easily defeated the allied forces of Odo, Chilperic, and Ragenfrid near Soissons. Chilperic and Odo fled to the land south of the Loire, and Ragenfrid fled to Angers. Soon Odo made peace and surrendered Chilperic to Charles, and Ragenfrid made peace too. The war was over, and Charles was undisputed dux Francorum.

Charles chose not to execute any of his enemies; indeed, Chilperic served in his army and was treated kindly. Plectrude was also treated kindly. Norwich comments "either Charles Martel possessed a degree of decency and kindness to defeated foes unknown in that age, or his belief in himself was so great that he felt he could afford kindness as the ultimate show of strength in allowing them to live after their various plots and machinations against him."
