= Battle of Compiègne =

First battle in the Frankish Civil War of 715–718

Coordinates: 49.39796°N 2.87301°E

The Battle of Compiègne was fought on 26 September 715 and was the first definite battle of the civil war which followed the death of Pepin of Heristal, Duke of the Franks, on 16 December 714.

Dagobert III had appointed one Ragenfrid as mayor of the palace in opposition to Pepin's choice as his successor: his grandson Theudoald. Ragenfrid engaged in battle with Theudoald, then young, and defeated him, sending him fleeing back to his grandmother Plectrude in Cologne.

According to the Liber Historiae Francorum, Theudoald lost his "innocent life" soon after, but other sources indicate him surviving for many years. Whatever the case, Charles Martel, Pepin's illegitimate son, soon escaped Plectrude's prison and Dagobert III soon died. The new king, Chilperic II, reappointed Ragenfrid, whose power was affirmed by the people of Neustria while the magnates of Austrasia elected Charles mayor. Plectrude remained holed up in Cologne, still with some supporters in Austrasia, and the war became a three-way conflict.

As soon as Charles Martel gathered his supporters and trained them, he triumphed over all comers.

== Sources ==
- Theudoald Fränkischer Hausmeier.
