= Battle of Amblève =

716 battle

Date	716
Location	Amel 50°28′48″N 5°38′19″E
Result	Austrasia victory

Belligerents
Austrasia	Neustria; Frisians

Commanders and leaders
Charles Martel	Chilperic II; Ragenfrid; Redbad, King of the Frisians
- Location within Belgium Battle of Amblève (Europe)

The Battle of Amblève took place in 716 near Amel. The mayor of the palace of Austrasia, Charles Martel, defeated his Neustrian and Frisian rivals who were led by King Chilperic II, his mayor Ragenfrid, and Redbad, King of the Frisians. It was the first major victory of Martel in a long career of victories. In this battle Martel began demonstrating the military genius which would mark the remainder of his life.

== History ==
Following his defeat at Cologne, Martel rallied his supporters in the mountains of the Eifel. Many Austrasians, under attack by Neustrians, Frisians, and Saxons in the northeast likely rallied behind Martel because he was the only surviving adult male of the Pippinnid family. His forces then attacked the army of Chilperic II and his allies at the Battle of Amblève near Amel as they returned triumphantly from Cologne. Martel used a feigned retreat, falling on his foes as they rested at midday, and feigning falling back to draw them fully out of a defensive position, where he defeated them. According to the Annals of Metz the casualties he inflicted on his foes were substantial. Martel remained undefeated until his death 25 years later.

Subsequently, Martel recovered much of the ransom paid by Plectrude to the king and Ragenfrid for Cologne.

A "feigned retreat," which became known as one of the Mongols' three favorite tactics, is one of the most difficult to perform during a battle, requiring discipline on the part of the troops and good timing on the part of the commander. The tactic involves getting troops to appear to flee only to reverse and stand once they have lured an opponent out of a stronger position, and have usually strung them out in pursuit, where they are easily picked off. Martel was the only general known to use it during the Dark Ages.
