= Grimoald the Younger =

Mayor of the palace of Neustria

Grimoald II (French: Grimaud) (died 714), called the Younger, was the mayor of the palace of Neustria from 695.

Grimoald was the second son of Pepin of Herstal and Plectrude and his father placed him in the office of mayor of the palace in the Neustrian kingdom sometime after 700, when he was still young.

When his elder brother, Drogo of Champagne, died in 708, Grimoald also received charge of northern Burgundy. He married Theudesinda (or Theodelinda), daughter of Radbod, King of the Frisians, and had two sons: Theudoald and Arnold. While returning from a visit to the tomb of Saint Lambert at Liège, Grimoald was murdered on the road to Jupille by a certain Rangar, in the employ of his father-in-law. His sons carried on a fight to be recognised as Pepin of Herstal's true heirs, since Grimoald predeceased his father, and his half-brother Charles succeeded to the lands and offices of their father.

== Sources ==
- Riché, Pierre. Les Carolingiens, une famille qui fit l'Europe. ISBN 2-01-278851-3
- Volkmann, Jean-Charles. Bien Connaître les généalogies des rois de France ISBN 2-87747-208-6
- Mourre, Michel. Le petit Mourre. Dictionnaire de l'Histoire ISBN 2-03-519265-X

Grimoald the Younger Arnulfing Dynasty Died: 714
Preceded by Nordebert	Mayor of the Palace of Neustria; 695–714	Succeeded by Theudoald
