= Battle of Vincy =

717 battle of the Frankish Civil War in present-day Les Rues-des-Vignes, France

Coordinates: 50°05′43″N 3°14′25″E

Battle of Vincy (717)
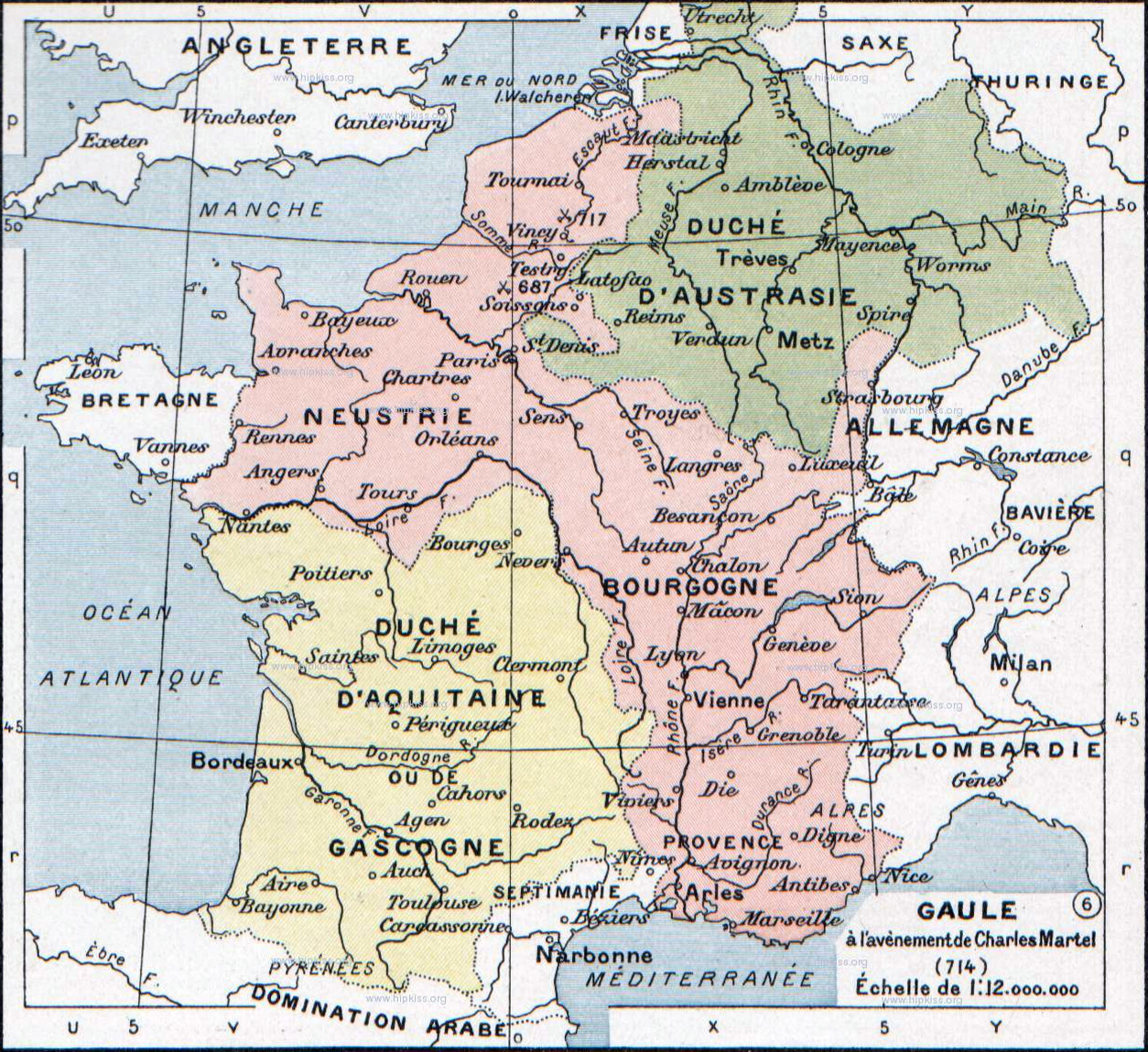
- Francia at the death of Pepin of Heristal in the 714
Date	March 21, 717
Location	Vincy (Current Les Rues-des-Vignes)
Result	Austrasian victory

Belligerents
Austrasia	Neustria

Commanders and leaders
Charles Martel	Chilperic II

Units involved
Unknown	Unknown

The Battle of Vincy (or Vinchy, now Les Rues-des-Vignes) was a battle of the Frankish civil war of 715–18 fought near Cambrai, in the modern département of Nord. It was a contest between Charles Martel and the Austrasians on one side and the king of the Franks, Chilperic II, and his mayor of the palace, Ragenfrid, on the other.

After the Battle of Amblève in 716, King Chilperic and Ragenfrid returned defeated to Neustria. Instead of following them at once, Charles again used tactics he would use all his remaining life, in a successful military career. He took time to rally more men and prepare, before descending in full force. By the following spring, Martel had attracted enough support to confront the Neustrians.

He chose where to provoke them to battle, and, at a place and time of his choosing. Charles eventually followed them and dealt them a serious blow at Vincy on 21 March 717. He pursued the fleeing king and mayor to Paris.

On this success, he proclaimed Clotaire IV king of Austrasia in opposition to Chilperic and deposed the bishop of Rheims, Rigobert, replacing him with one Milo. The defeated Chilperic II, and his mayor of the palace, Ragenfrid, were essentially broken after this battle.

== Sources ==
- Oman, Charles. The Dark Ages, 476–918. London: Rivingtons, 1914.
