= Theudoald =

Mayor of the palace (708–741)

Theudoald (or Theodald; c. 708 – 741) was the Frankish mayor of the palace, briefly unopposed in 714 after the death of his grandfather, Pepin of Herstal. In 715, the nobility acclaimed Ragenfrid mayor of Neustria and Charles Martel mayor of Austrasia.

Theudoald was the legitimate but later claimed illegitimate son of Grimoald II (son of Pepin II of Herstal and Plectrude) and Theudesinda of Frisia (daughter of king Radbod). Thus, he was a grandson of the Frisian king. His grandmother Plectrude tried to have him recognised by his grandfather as the legitimate heir to all the Pippinid lands, instead of Charles Martel.

Ragenfrid defeated Theudoald and his forces in September 715 at the Battle of Compiègne; Theudoald returned to Cologne. His grandmother surrendered on his behalf in 716 to Chilperic II of Neustria and Ragenfrid.

Theudoald died, probably killed, around 741, after the death of his uncle and protector, Charles Martel. It is notable that, despite his having been proclaimed heir to Pepin of Herstal, when Charles Martel seized power, he allowed his nephew to live, instead of killing him, as was often the case in the Middle Ages.

Theudoald Arnulfing Dynasty Born: 708 Died: 741
Preceded by Grimoald II	Mayor of the Palace of Neustria; 714	Succeeded by Ragenfrid
Preceded by Pepin II the Middle	Mayor of the Palace of Austrasia; 714	Succeeded by Charles Martel
