= Ragenfrid =

8th-century Frankish nobleman; mayor of the palace of Neustria and Burgundy

Ragenfrid (also Ragenfred, Raganfrid, or Ragamfred) (died 731) was the mayor of the palace of Neustria and Burgundy from 715, when he filled the vacuum in Neustria caused by the death of Pepin of Heristal, until 718, when Charles Martel finally established himself over the whole Frankish kingdom.

== Life ==
His original centre of power was the Véxin. The Neustrian nobles named Ragenfrid mayor of the palace in opposition to Theudoald, grandson and heir of Pepin, and his grandmother Plectrude, but he was ignored by both Plectrude and Charles.

They allied with Dagobert's old enemy, Duke Radbod of Frisia, allied with Ragenfrid in a campaign against the Austrasians. On 26 September 715, Ragenfrid engaged in battle with Theudoald's forces at the Battle of Compiègne, and defeated them, sending Theudoald fleeing back to his grandmother Plectrude in Cologne.

In 716, Ragenfrid and Dagobert's successor, Chilperic II, fought deep into the heartland of Peppinid power: the mid-Meuse and Ardennes. Ragenfrid and Radbod converged on Cologne, where Charles Martel had been besieging Plectrude and Theudoald. The Frisians held off Charles, who retreated to the Eifel mountains to regroup. Chilperic and Ragenfrid then besieged Plectrude who was forced to acknowledged Chilperic as king, surrender a substantial portion of the Austrasian treasury, and abandoned her grandson's claim to the mayoralty. The Neustrians then withdrew.

By April 716, having rallied his supporters, Charles returned and pursued Chilperic and Ragenfrid, and defeated them at the Battle of Amblève, recovering much of his father's treasure.

After Amblève, King Chilperic and Ragenfrid returned in defeat to Neustria. Instead of following them immediately, took the next several months gathering more men. Both sides spent the winter in preparations.

On 21 March 717, Martel dealt a serious blow to the Neustrians at the Battle of Vincy. The King and Ragenfrid fled to Paris, with Charles following, but as he was not yet prepared to hold the city, he turned back to deal with Plectrude and Cologne. Plectrude surrendered the city and was allowed to retire to a convent. Her grandson, Theudoald, lived under his uncle's protection until Martel's death in 741.

In 718 Ragenfrid and Chilperic allied with Odo the Great, duke of Aquitaine independent since 715. French historian Pierre Riché suggests that he may have been offered recognition as king of Aquitaine. The allies were defeated at the Battle of Soissons. Chilperic and Odo fled south; Ragenfrid, now decisively out of power, went to Angers with remains of the Neustrian army. When Paris and the Loire Valley were taken and Odo gave up Chilperic, who Charles finally accepted in 719, Ragenfrid then gave himself up and, deprived of his office, left only with lands in Anjou.

In 724, the Neustrians rebelled under Ragenfrid, who defended Angers so well, that Charles decided to treat with him. Ragenfrid was allowed to keep his county for life, on condition that he give his son as hostage to ensure his conduct. Ragenfrid lived until 731.

The military defeats of the Neustrian army, under the leadership of Ragenfrid, at the Amblève, Vinchy and Soissons marked the shift in the balance of power from Neustria to Austrasia. From then on the Carolingians (the descendants of Charles Martel) would rule the whole of the Frankish kingdom from their heartland around the mid-Meuse, namely Herstal and later Aachen with Charlemagne.

Preceded by Theudoald	Mayor of the Palace of Neustria; 714–718	Succeeded by Charles Martel
