= Plectrude =

Consort of Frankish ruler Pepin of Herstal (died 718)

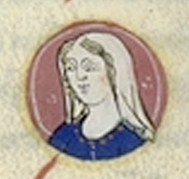
Plectrude

Plectrude (Latin: Plectrudis; German: Plektrud, Plechtrudis) (born c 650-died 718) was the consort of Pepin of Herstal, the mayor of the palace and duke of the Franks, from about 670. She was the daughter of Hugobert, seneschal of Clovis IV, and Irmina of Oeren. She was the regent of Neustria during the minority of her grandson Theudoald from 714 until 718.

== Biography ==
=== Marriage and children ===
Plectrude was described as politically active and influential upon her husband and his reign. She brought a large amount of property to the Arnulfing house. Plectrude was the daughter of Hugobert, seneschal of Clovis IV, and lady Irmina of Oeren. While there is no hard evidence for the identification of Irmina as her mother, it is highly probable as both women held land which was inherited from the same source. Irmina came from one of the most powerful families in the Merovingian kingdom. After the death of Hugobert in 697, Irmina gave the monk Willibrord the land on which to build the Abbey of Echternach. Much of Pepin's wealth came from his marriage to Plectrude. During the reign of Pepin, she appears as his joint signatory in every legal instrument issued by him that is still preserved, which was unusual for this time period. She had two sons by Pepin, Drogo and Grimoald.

Both her sons died before Pepin, Drogo died in 707 and Grimoald was murdered in 714. She ensured Pepin II's assent that Theudoald, Grimoald's son, would be his main heir.

=== Regent of Neustria ===
When Pepin died soon thereafter at the end of 714, she took power in Neustria as regent of the under-age Theudoald. This appointment of a child as mayor of the palace was unprecedented.

To ensure her reign, she imprisoned Charles Martel, Pepin II's son with his second wife Alpaida, in Cologne. Charles is often said to have been illegitimate, but this is considered by many today an anachronistic interpretation of his status. Charles' contemporaries most likely did not consider him illegitimate, as he was born while his mother Alpaida was married to Pepin the Frank, and noblemen practiced polygamy in this period.

In 715, the Neustrian nobility rebelled against her in alliance with Radbod of Friesland and defeated her in the Battle of Compiègne, which took place on September 26, 715, causing her to take refuge in Cologne. Cologne was the homeland of her family clan and where she kept Pepin's money.

In 716, Chilperic II, the king of the Franks, and Ragenfrid, the mayor of the palace, led an army into Austrasia, near Cologne, where Plectrude had gone. They defeated her and freed Charles Martel. Plectrude acknowledged Chilperic as king, gave over the Austrasian treasury, and abandoned her grandson's claim to the mayoralty. The king and his mayor then turned to besiege their other rival in the city and claimed it. The treasury shortly after received recognition by the king and mayor. The juncture of these events favored Charles. In 717, he chased the king and the mayor to Paris before turning back to deal with Plectrude in Cologne. He then took the city and dispersed her supporters.

=== Death ===
Plectrude entered a convent, and died shortly after in the same year in Cologne, where she was buried in the monastery of St. Maria im Kapitol which she had founded. Her grandson Theudoald lived under his uncle's protection until Martel's death in 741.

== Issue ==
Her sons by Pepin were:

- Drogo, duke of Champagne
- Grimoald, mayor of the palace of Neustria

== Historiography Notes ==
Using the translation done by and provided by Paul Fouracre and Richard A.Gerberding in Late Merovingian France: History and Hagiography, 640-720, of the Annales Mettenses Priores (The Earlier Annals of Metz), Plectrude is described as “keeping Charles(Martel) from the legitimate governance of his father’s authority,” as well as having “decided to rule with feminine cunning more cruelly than was necessary,” and is blamed for the Neustrians rising up against her and her grandson.

They further discuss whether the Annals, possibly written at Chelles during a time when a sister of Charlemagne was abbess was written by a woman or not. They conclude that if the Source was written by a woman, it was likely “a misogynistic one,” due to the language used to describe Plectrude(as quoted above).

Paul Fouracre further expands on this imagery of Plectrude in The Age of Charles Martel, writing that this phrasing used against Plectrude might be a result of the anonymous writer’s allegiance to Charles Martel, emphasizing that he was “the only surviving heir worthy of great power,” by depicting Plectrude as “unfit to rule,” and asserting that she “plotted to keep him down in favour of her grandson, Theudoald, a mere child.”

It seems to Fouracre then that the author of this Source framed Charles Martel as “the Franks’ saviour” at the expense of Plectrude’s legacy.

In depicting Plectrude as having made(and failed) at an attempt to hold Pippin II’s inheritance for her grandson at Charles Martel’s expense, the Annals have secured her legacy as a “pushy stepmother(s) rather than kindly mother(s)”

Rosamond McKitterick disagrees with Fouracre and Gerberding’s assessment that the author of the Earlier Annals of Metz could not be a woman due to the use of language against Plectrude, arguing instead that the Annals “is more concerned with division and succession” and the purpose of the author was legitimizing the Carolinian family’s claim to the Francia kingdom. To her, because the Annals were more focused on justifying the Carolingian family’s new dynasty, and Plectrude, as Charles Martel’s stepmother was intervening in his right to his father’s inheritance, hence why the hostility in wording used referring to Plectrude.

== The Annals of Metz and "The Continuations of Fredegar" ==
The following is an excerpt from the Earlier Annals of Metz(or Annales Mettenses Priores) as translated by Paul Fouracre and Richard A. Gerbderding in Late Merovingan France: History and Hagiography, 640-720.

"Plectrud desired to promote her grandson, Theudoald, she was keeping Charles from the legitimate governance of his father's authority and she herself, with the infant, in a womanly plan, presumed to control the reins of so great a kingdom. Because she had decided to rule with feminine cunning more cruelly than was necessary, she quickly turned the wrath of the Neustrian Franks."

Plectrude is also mentioned in the "Fourth Book of the Chronicles of Fredegar with its Continuations." This source is more favorable to Plectrude, referring to her as "the fine woman," and stating that she "governed the kingdom wisely."
