= List of rulers of Frisia =

Flag of Frisia, with seven lilies

This is a list of historically verifiable, legendary and fictitious rulers of Frisia, whether they were called chieftains, counts, dukes or kings. The earliest names of Frisian rulers are documented by the chronicles of the Merovingian (Frankish) kings, with whom they were contemporaries. In these chronicles, these rulers were styled dux, a Latin term for leader which is the origin of the title duke and its cognates in other languages. English sources refer to them as kings.

After coming under Frankish rule, the Frisian districts were governed by counts, later on also by dukes and bishops exerting the count's privileges. The power of these counts was restricted, however, due to the decentralized nature of the maritime landscape, which prevented large-scale military operations. After the Treaty of Verdun (843) Frisia was allocated to Middle Francia, after the Treaty of Meersen (870) it became part of East Francia, i.e. the German Kingdom. The foreign - largely Saxon - magnates that held office were dependent on local nobles helping them to exploit privileges, administer justice and raise troops. Only in the coastal districts of Holland a local dynasty developed, due to extensive royal domains.

In fact, the Frisians were ruled by local officials such as the frana and skelta, that were in most cases appointed by counts. As the power of counts waned during the 12th century, these functionaries were replaced by elected grietmannen (prosecutors) in Friesland or redjeva (judges or advocati) in Groningen and East-Frisia. The position of grietmannen evolved towards a government office and was ultimately transformed into the office of mayor in 1851.

== Kingdom of Frisia ==
Note that a supposed "House of Frisia" as well as the names of most members of the house are mythological or fictitious. Early modern historians created the story of a continuous dynasty.

After the Migration Period, several Frisian Kingdoms may have emerged in the districts northwest of the Frankish Kingdom, each districts characterized by a distinctive style of ornaments. One of these kingdoms may have been ruled by the legendary Finn, son of Folcwald, well known from Beowulf, Widsith and the Finnesburg Fragment. According to legend, Finn was killed by the Jutish leader, Hengist, who migrated to Britain in 449 and founded the Kingdom of Kent thereafter.

The early medieval Frisians were in fact, like Hengist and Horsa, immigrants from Anglo-Saxon descent, absorbing the older name of the Frisii that inhabited the area in Roman times. Under Radbod of Frisia the Frisian kingship reached its maximum geographical extent, covering the coastal districts of North and South Holland (Frisia ulterior) with parts of Utrecht and the town of Dorestad (Frisia citerior). Radbod may also have extended his power to the province of Friesland, but his rule did not extend farther East. The province of Zeeland may already have been under Frankish rule during his lifetime.

In 722 the Frisian land west of the River Vlie came under Frankish rule and were christianized. In 734, after the Battle of the Boarn, the area west of the Lauwers (nowadays Friesland) was occupied by the Franks. The Frisians east of the Lauwers (Groningen and East Frisia) were subjugated in 785. The Frisian immigrants of the isle of Helgoland and in Schleswig-Holstein remained under Danish or Jutish rule.

Name	Lifespan	Reign start	Reign end	Notes	Family	Image
Finn Folcwalding			before 449	legendary		
Audulf		c. 600	c. 630	disputed, probably in Westergo, but may have been a Frankish moneyer; attested only in a small number of Merovingian-style golden coins and;		
Aldgisl: Aldegisel		650/77	679	first Frisian monarch attested in historical sources		
Radbod of Frisia: Redbad, Radboud		679	719	son of Aldgisl		
Poppo: Bubo, Bobba			734	called a dux (count) in Frankish sources, ruled East of the River Vlie		

=== Fictitious kings, princes and dukes ===
During the 15th and 16th centuries historians from Holland and Friesland invented a series of Frisian monarchs. The historian Goffe Jensma states in his introduction to a course at the University of Amsterdam:

"One of the characteristics of Frisian historiography and literature from the Middle Ages up to the nineteenth and twentieth century is the existence of a comprehensive corpus of fantastic, apocryphal and mystified historic works, which deal with the origins and identity of the Frisians. Well known examples are medieval myths of origin like the Gesta Frisiorum or the Tractatus Alvini, sixteenth-century humanistic scholarly books by e.g. Suffridus Petrus, Ocko van Scarl en Martinus Hamconius and nineteenth-century forgeries like the Tescklaow and the infamous Oera Linda Book."

Several names of Frisian kings appear in 14th- and 15th-century chronicles from Holland and Hainaut. Among these names three stand out. The name Gondebald or Gondebuef is derived from the 12th-century Historia Caroli Magni. Here he is introduced as a Christian king, who fell at Roncevalles and was buried in a collective mound in Belin-Béliet. He plays a role in Hainaut-Bavarian historiography, because his name was linked to dynastic claims regarding the Kingdom of Friesland. Aldgisl II and Radboud II are doubles of Aldgisl I and Redbad I, and were also depicted as Christian Kings and ancestors of several noble families in Holland. Radboud II was supposed to have been the first Lord of Egmond, married to a Princess Amarra of Hungary (i.e. of the Huns) and according to the legend buried on Lord Radbod's cemetery (Heer Raetbouts kerckhof) in Rinnegom near the Abbey of Egmond. The historian Eggerik Beninga from East Frisia introduced a King Ritzart, who was supposed to have lived 625.

The classicist Suffridus Petrus (1527–1597), professor in Cologne and official chronicler of the Estates of Friesland and his successor in Friesland Bernardus Furmerius (1545–1616) constructed a series of fictitious princes, dukes and kings, beginning with Prince Friso, son of Adel, who had allegedly migrated from India during the time of Alexander the Great. The list was completed by Martinus Hamconius in his chronicle Frisia seu de viris rebusque illustribus (1609, 2nd. ed. 1623). According to the latter, there had been seven princes of Frisia, followed by seven dukes and nine kings. The dynasty of kings was succeeded by seventeen podestàs (stadtholders or governors), of which only the last one was historical. All four lists focused on the province of Friesland and not on the other parts of Frisia.

Seven Princes

- Friso, 313–245 BCE, established a militaristic hereditary monarchy
- Adel, 245–151 BCE
- Ubbo, 151–71 BCE
- Asinga Ascon, 71 BCE – 11 CE, reviled for employing foreign troops and bringing plague
- Diocarus Segon, 11–46 CE
- Dibbaldus Segon, 46–85 CE
- Tabbo, 85–130 CE

Seven dukes

- Asconius, 130–173 CE, his title downgraded to duke as he was supposed to have been a Roman client
- Adelboldus, 173–187
- Titus Boiocalus, 187–240
- Ubbo, 240–299
- Haron Ubbo, 299–335
- Odilbaldus, 335–360
- Udolphus Haron, 360–392

Nine kings

- Richardus, Uffo, 392–435
- Odilbaldus, 435–470
- Richoldus, 470–533
- Beroaldus, 533–590
- Adgillus I, 590–672
- Radbodus I, 672–723
- Adgillus II, 723–737, loyal Christian vassal of the Franks, brother of Poppo
- Gondobaldus, 737–749 (also Aldegisel III), son of Aldgillus II
- Radbodus II, 749–775. He was, according to Hamconius, a heathen and grew up in the court of the King of Denmark. He was supposed to have participated in the Saxon rebellion and thought to have fled back to Denmark, after which the Kingdom of Frisia was dissolved.

Medieval chivalric romances contain the names of other fictitious Frisian kings. French romances refer to Enguerran, Galesis, Gondelbuef, Hugon (de Vauvenice), Louhout, Polions, Rabel and Raimbault de Frise, the last two as corrupted forms of Radbod. The 13th-century Old Norse Þiðreks saga, translated from a lost Lower German original, contains the names of the Frisian kings Osid and his son Otnid, supposedly the father and brother of the famous Atli (Atila) the Hun. Layamon's Brut mentions King Calin of Frisselond (corrupted to Kinkailin) as one of the regional kings who was subordinate to King Arthur.

=== Oera Linda Book ===
A 19th century pseudo-chronicle, the Oera Linda Book (1872), embellished these stories further by describing an ancient and glorious history for the Frisians extending back thousands of years. Originally, they were supposedly ruled over by a line of matriarchs known as folk-mothers, founded by the eponymous goddess Frya as an ancestress of all Frisians. The authorship is uncertain, but the book is generally considered to be a hoax or parody. Several legendary princes from 16th-century mythical historiography were also incorporated in the story.

Fictitious goddesses and folk-mothers

- Frya, ?–2194 BCE, eponymous ancestress of the Frisians, who supposedly inhabited all of Northern and Western Europe)
- Fasta, 2194–after 2145 BCE (appointed by Frya when the latter ascended to the stars during a terrible flood)
- Medea
- Thiania
- Hellenia
- Minna, fl. 2013 BCE, faced an invasion of Finns from the east, who settled in the Frisian lands in Scandinavia
- Rosamond, 1631-? BCE, the Frisians in Western Europe revolted and became the Celts
- Hellicht, fl. 1621 BCE
- Frana, ?–590 BCE, murdered by the Finns during an invasion
- Adela (de facto), 590–559 BCE, supposedly ordered the compilation of what became the Oera Linda Book
- Gosa, 306–before 264 BCE, elected after a long vacancy, Frisian rule confined to approximately the modern Netherlands)
- Prontlik, fl. c. 60 BCE, puppet folk-mother appointed by King Asinga Ascon

Fictitious kings

- Adel I Friso de facto, 304-264 BCE
- Adel II Atharik ("Rich of friends"), 264-? BCE
- Adel III Ubbo
- Adel IV Asega Askar ("Black Adel")

== Frankish Frisia: counts and dukes ==
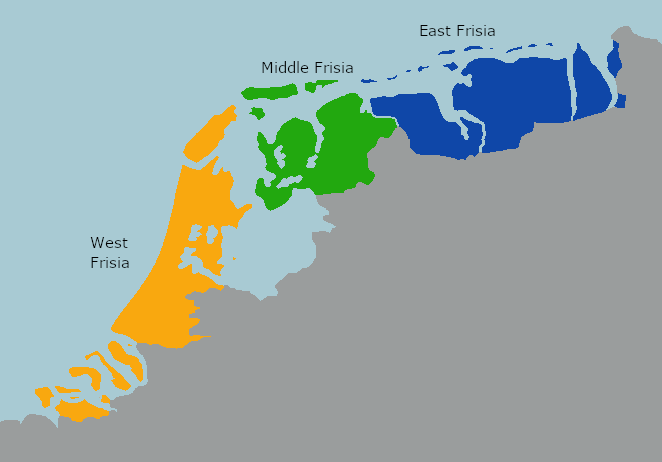
Division of Frisia by the Lex Frisionum

Poppo's defeat generally marks the conquest of Frisia by the Franks, following the defeat Frisia is divided in three parts:

- West Frisia, the region from the Scheldt to the Vlie roughly the modern region of Holland conquered in 719
- Middle Frisia, the region from the Vlie to the Lauwers roughly the modern territory of the province Friesland conquered in 734
- East Frisia, the region from the Lauwers to the Weser conquered in 775

It is further divided in Gaue

In 785 the Franks under Charlemagne took control of what remained of the Frisian territory (East Frisia) and incorporated it into their kingdom. Counts appointed by the Frankish rulers were:

=== West Frisia 719-1101 ===
- 793–810, Nordalah, ruled Wieringen
- -837, Ekkehard (Eggihard), ruled Walcheren

==== House of Jutland ====
- 841–844, Harald the Younger, in Walcheren
- 855–873, Rodulf Haraldsson, succeeded Harald the Younger, his region of Zeeland became part of West Francia after the Treaty of Meersen
- 839–875, Rorik of Dorestad, acquired all of West Frisia, Utrecht and Dorestad, ruled from Wieringen

=== House of Godfrid ===
- 882–885, Godfrid, reconquered Rorik's domain

==== House of West Frisia ====
Godfrid was ambushed and killed, count Gerolf is believed to have been one of the nobles involved in the attack as he is rewarded shortly after with most of Godfrid's domain: the coastline from Vlie to Meuse and upriver the Gaue Nifterlake, Lek & IJssel and several properties in Teisterbant. However, this 'reward' was granted four years after Godfrid's death by Arnulf of Carinthia, and not by Charles the Fat, his predecessor, who was behind the plot to kill Godfrid.

- 883–916, Gerulf the younger, plausible son of Deodred (Diederik)
- 916–939, Dirk I, Dirk inherited most of the coastline of Gerulf's domain. Waldger, Dirk's brother inherited the eastern inland territories.
- 939–988, Dirk II, Ruled West Frisia now roughly the Gaue Maasland, Kennemerland and Texel
- 988–993, Arnulf I, killed by rebelling Frisians, for the Frisians of roughly the Gau Westflinge this marks the beginning of the Frisian Freedom and approximately 300 years of self-governance
- 993–1039, Dirk III, moved his court south to Vlaardingen
- 1039–1049, Dirk IV
- 1049–1061, Floris I, brother of Dirk IV
- 1061–1091, Dirk V, fought a long war to claim his inheritance
- 1091–1101, Floris II the Fat, the title "Count of Frisia west of the Vlie" was changed to "Count of Holland". Continues in Counts of Holland.

=== Middle Frisia 734-1222 ===
- 734?-754-768, Alfbad (Praefectus Abba), governed at least Oostergo
- 768–793, Theoderic (Diederik), killed in the Uprising of 793, his domain is unknown but likely somewhere in between the Vlie and Weser
- 810-834 & 839-???, Gerulf the elder, plausible son of theoderic, Reeve of Frisians from Vlie to Weser
- c.820, Deodred (Diederik), plausible son of Gerulf the elder, held lands in the Westerkwartier
- 824?-834-855, Gerhart, plausibly related to Deodred, ruled in Westergo
- 855–870, Wiccing, also held lands in Westerkwartier
- 870-873?, Albdag, defended Oostergo against Rodulf Haraldsson
- -885-, Gardulf, mentioned together with Gerulf the younger and plausibly related
- 921–945, Reginbert, Ruled in Franeker the traditional seat of government for Westergo and likely family of the Reginingen that held considerable property across Middle Frisia and the west Frisian Islands
- 945–966, Gerbert, son of Reginbert

In 775, Charles the Great made Frisia officially part of the Frankish Kingdom. The wars ended with the last uprising of the Frisians in 793 and the pacification of them. Counts were appointed by the Frankish monarchs. However, Danish Vikings raided Frisia in the end of the 9th century and established Viking rule. After the division of the Frankish Kingdom in West Francia and East Francia, they gained more autonomy.

Name	Lifespan	Reign start	Reign end	Notes	Family	Image
Alfbad: Abba, Boppa		749	775/786	possibly son of Redbad	Frisia	Coat of arms in use centuries later
Nordalah		786?	806?	son of Alfbad	Frisia	Coat of arms in use centuries later
Dirk		806?	810?		Frisia	Coat of arms in use centuries later
Godfrey		807/08	839?	invader	Danish	Coat of arms in use centuries later
Rorik		ca. 841	ca. 873	cousin of Godfrey; invader	Danish	Coat of arms in use centuries later
Gerulf I: Gerulf the Elder; Gerolf de Oude		before 839	after 855	son of Dirk or Nordalah?; reeve of the Frisians between Vlie and the river Weser	Frisia	Coat of arms in use centuries later

=== House of Billung ===
- 955–994, Ekbert the one eyed, inherits frisian lands likely through his maternal grandmother Reginhilde, possible sister of Reginbert and mother of Matilda of Ringelheim
- 994-1024-1030?, Wichmann III & Ekbert, sons of Egbert the one eyed

==== House of Brunswick ====
- 1024?-1038, Liudolf, either through marriage with the daughter of Ekbert or conquest
- 1038–1057, Bruno, son of Liudolf, expands middle frisia with the ommelanden
- 1057–1068, Egbert I, son of Bruno
- 1068-1086?-1089, Egbert II, son of Egbert I, punished for his participation in the Saxon Rebellion
- 1089–1099, Egbert's properties in Frisia are given to the Bishopric of Utrecht, Bishop Conrad

==== House of Nordheim ====
- 1099–1101, Henry I the Fat, through marriage with Gertrude, daughter of Egbert II, Murdered on arrival
- 1101–1117, Otto III, son of Henry the Fat
- 1117-?, Otto I, Count of Salm, through marriage with Gertrude of Northeim, the daughter of Henry the Fat

Otto III failed to establish his rule in Frisia, and the land reverted to the bishop of Utrecht. Utrecht and Holland fought over the rights to Middle Frisia, and from 1165 administered it in condominium. With the Hollandic counts and Utrecht bishops failing to agree under whose authority the Frisians would fall, they were left to rule themselves.

==== House of Holland ====
- 1203?-1222, William of Frisia, in 1178 William's brother Baldwin becomes bishop of Utrecht while his other brother Dirk VII is Count of Holland so Holland and Utrecht agree to make William ruler of Middle Frisia, his power in Frisia fades after his victory in the Loon War and his descendants would not inherit it. Many Frisians followed William in the Fifth Crusade as documented in De itinere Frisonum.

==== Upstalsboom Treaty ====
- 1156, The Frisian diet or ding at the Upstalsboom. What starts out as a loose gathering becomes an increasingly formal alliance or Confederacy, in a response to increased aggression from the counts of Holland, continues in Potestaat of Friesland

=== East Frisia 775-1220 ===
==== House of Frisia ====
- 768–793, Theoderic (Diederik), killed in the Uprising of 793, his domain is unknown but likely somewhere in between the Vlie and Weser
- 810-834 & 839-???, Gerulf the elder

The Frankish kings divided the region in at least two parts. How the region between the Lauwers and the Eems is defined remains unclear. The western part of East Frisia was centered around the mouth of the Eems roughly corresponding to Emsgau and Federgau. The eastern part was centered around the mouth of the Weser, encompassing the Nordendi, Astergau, Wangerland, Östringen and Rüstringen, assumed to be the county that Harald Klak received.

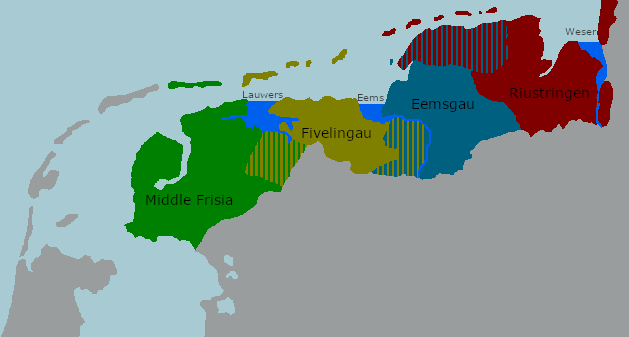
Rough outline of the four counties of Frisia east of the Vlie

=== Ommelanden ===
- c.820, Diederik, held lands in Westerkwartier
- 855–870, Wiccing, also held lands in Westerkwartier

==== House of Meginhard ====
- 843–880, Wichman II
- 892–932, Ekbert, also known as Egbert Billung

===== House of Billung =====
- 932–938, Wichman I,
- 936?-973, Herman I

===== House of Werl =====
- ?-1044, Rudolf von Werl

===== House of Brunswick =====
- 1047–1057, Bruno, expands middle frisia with the ommelanden
- 1057–1061, Egbert I
- 1068–1089, Egbert II

Not much is known about the region following the Brunonen, it eventually joins into the Upstalboom treaty. The city of Groningen, at the time in Drenthe becomes very powerful. It quickly becomes an important member of the free Frisian lands and towards the end of the 14th century comes to rule over the Ommelanden. Groningen joined the other six provinces in Februari 1595 and formed the seventh province of the Seven Provinces

=== Emsgau ===
==== House of Ekbert ====
- 822–855, Cobbo the Elder, possible son of Ekbert duke of Saxony at the time

==== House of Werl ====
- -899- Adalbert
- Herman
- c.947-955, Hendrik
- c.955-986, Herman I
- 997–1024, Herman II
- c.1031-1038-1070, Bernard & Adalbert, ruled Emsgau & Federgau respectively
- c.1092-1096, Koenraad

Given to the Bishop of Bremen

==== House of Calvelage ====
- c.1100-1134 Herman or Herman II
- 1134–1175, Otto I
- 1175-c.1220, Herman III

The house of Calvelage likely never stepped foot in east Frisia and lost their belongings when the region entered into the Upstalboom treaty.

=== Riustringen ===
- 772–793, Unno & Eilrad

==== House of Jutland ====
- 827-852?, Harald Klak, was gifted Riustringen by Louis the Pious

==== House of Stade ====
- 847?-880, Lothar I
- 880–929, Lothar II
- -976, Henry the Bald

==== House of Billung ====
Directly ruled under the following dukes of Saxony

- 976–1011, Bernard,
- 1011–1059, Bernard II
- 1059–1072, Ordulf
- 1072–1106, Magnus

==== House of Oldenburg ====
Following the end of house Billung in 1106 the east of Riustringen is slowly being conquered by the county of Oldenburg, the remainder joined into the Frisian alliance, continues in Potestaat of Friesland

=== Dux & Margraves ===
==== Dux ====
Dux should not be confused with Duke, the Frisian Dux was a military commander responsible for the defence of the Frisian territory, particularly against the Norse raiders.

- 783–793, Theodoric, killed in the Uprising of 793
- 794-???, possibly Meginhard I
- 812–834, Gerulf the Elder, was punished for failing to hold back the Norsemen
- 834–837, Hemming Halfdansson
- 839-c.860, Rorik of Dorestad
- 867–870, Ubbe Ragnarsson, sources mention him as Dux Frisonum, the timeframe corresponds roughly with Rodulf Haraldsson's presence in Frisia which has led people to believe they are the same person
- 870-875, Rorik of Dorestad, returns
- 882-885, Godfrid, Duke of Frisia
- 885-898, Everhard Saxo, killed by Waldger of Teisterbant

==== Margraves ====
- 1024-1038, Liudolf
- 1038-1057, Bruno
- 1057-1068, Egbert I
- 1068-1089, Egbert II
- 1099-1101, Henry I the Fat

== See also ==
- Potestaat of Friesland
- List of stadtholders in the Low Countries#Lordship of Frisia

== Bibliography ==
- Ancient Holland: The History of the Lowlands
- Petz, G.H. (ed). MGH Scriptures. (Hanover, 1892).
- Jaekel, H. (1895), Die Grafen von Mittelfriesland aus dem Geschlecht König Ratbods
- van Blom, Ph. (1900), Geschiedenis van Oud-Friesland.
- Fries Genootschap van Geschied-, Oudheid- en Taalkunde en de Fryske Akademy, (1970), De Vrije Fries (50th ed.), Leeuwarden
- Henstra, D.J. (2012), Friese graafschappen tussen Zwin en Wezer, Assen: van Gorcum, ISBN 9789023249788
- Lawætz, P. (2019), Danske vikingekonger - én slægt med mange grene, https://vikingekonger.dk/
