= Frisian–Frankish wars =

Early medieval Western European war

Frisian-Frankish War
- Map of the Frankish Empire from 481 to 814
Date	7th and 8th century
Location	The Netherlands and Germany
Result	Frankish victory
Territorial changes	The Frisian Kingdom is incorporated into the Carolingian Empire

Belligerents
Carolingian Empire	Frisian Kingdom

The Frisian–Frankish wars were a series of conflicts between the Frankish Empire and the Frisian Kingdom in the 7th and 8th centuries. The wars were mainly about control of the Rhine delta. After the death of the Frisian king Radbod, the Franks gained the upper hand. In 734 at the Battle of the Boarn the Frisians were defeated and the Franks annexed the Frisian lands between the Vlie and the Lauwers. Only the Frisians east of the Lauwers remained independent. In 772 they lost their independence as well. The wars ended with the last revolt of the Frisians in 793 and the pacification of the Frisians by Charlemagne.

== Background ==
The displacements of peoples during the Migration Period resulted in the Frisian settlements in the north and the west of the Low Countries, the Saxons in the east, the Warnen at the mouth of the Rhine and the Franks further south around the Scheldt. There, under the leadership of their Merovingian kings, they had an important role in the politics in northern Gaul.

The Frisians consisted of loosely bonded tribes centered on war bands but without great power. In the second half of the 7th century the Frisian kingdom reached its maximum geographic development. The Frisian kings became interested in former Frankish lands; under the leadership of the predecessors of Aldgisl they expanded their power to the heart of the Low Countries. The presence of the Warnen at the mouth of the Rhine remains unclear, but it appears they were likely crushed between the Frisians and Franks.

== Battles for the Rhine delta ==
The Merovingian king of Neustria Chilperic I (561–584) is mentioned in Frankish sources as the "terror of the Frisians and the Suebi". A few coins commemorating an otherwise obscure figure named Audulf survive from the late 6th or early 7th century. Their reverse inscription victvria avdvlfo (possibly intending "Victory by Audulf") is sometimes conjectured to celebrate a victory by Audulf over the Franks, although this remains uncertain.

By 630 the situation had changed. The Merovingian king Dagobert I brought the Frankish Empire under one banner again and conquered the lands south of the Oude Rijn. This time they brought Christianity to the Frisian lands and built a church in Utrecht. After Dagobert died the Franks could not hold their position there, and around 650 the central river area, including Dorestad became Frisian again. The manufacturing of Frankish coins stopped and the city of Utrecht became the residence of the Frisian kings.

Under the rule of King Aldgisl the Frisians came into conflict with the Neustrian mayor of the palace Ebroin (675–681). This time the conflict was about the old Roman border fortifications. Aldgisl kept the Franks at a bay with his army maneuvers. In 678 he welcomed the English bishop Wilfrid, who like him was not a friend of Ebroin.

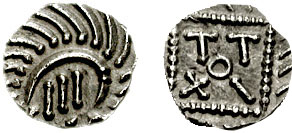
Frisian sceattas from approximately 710 to 735

Under the successor of Aldgisl, Radbod, the tide turned in favour of the Franks; by 689 Neustria, Austrasia and Burgundy were united under mayor of the palace Pepin of Herstal. In 690 Pepin was victorious in the battle of Dorestad. Though not all the consequences of this battle are clear, Dorestad became Frankish again, as did the castles of Utrecht and Fechten. It is thought that the influence of the Franks now extended from south of the Oude Rijn to the coast, but this is not entirely clear because the Frisians did not entirely lose control over the central river area. In any case there was an Archbishopric or bishopric of the Frisians founded for missionary Willibrord and a marriage was held between Grimoald the Younger the oldest son of Pepin, and Thiadsvind, the daughter of Radbod in 711.

After Pepin died in 714, Radbod took part in the battle for succession in Frankish lands. He concluded a treaty with the new Neustrian mayor of the palace Ragenfrid and in 716 their armies entered Austrasian territory as far as Cologne, where they were victorious in the Battle of Cologne. In this way all lands south of the Rhine became Frisian again. The army returned to the north with much war loot. Radbod made plans to invade the Frankish empire for the second time and mobilised a large army. But before he could do this he fell ill and died in the autumn of 719.

== End of the independent kingdom ==
After the battle of Soissons, Frankish territories of Neustria and Austrasia were reunited under Mayor of the Palace Charles Martel and nominal king Chilperic II. It is not certain who the successor of the Frisian king Radbod was. It is believed that there were troubles with the succession, because the Frankish opponent Charles Martel easily invaded Frisia and subjugated the territory. The resistance was so weak that Charles Martel not only annexed Frisia Citerior ("nearer" Frisia south of the Rhine), but he also crossed the Rhine and annexed "farther" Frisia, to the banks of the river Vlie. Now protected by the Franks, missionary Willibrord returned to Frisia in 719.

== Frisian resistance ==
=== Initial revolts ===
There was a rebellion against Frankish rule in the region of Westergo in 733, which Charles put down. The inhabitants gave hostages, converted to Christianity, and recognized Frankish overlordship, but after Charles left they were punished by their fellow Frisians. In 734, the Frisians rebelled again, this time under the leadership of Duke Bubo, who did not recognize Frankish supremacy with his territory probably only encompassing the north of the former king Radbod's Frisia. Charles gathered a large fleet and army and prepared a naval invasion. The Frisians were defeated in Battle of the Boarn that followed, and Bubo was killed. The victors plundered and burned non-Christian sanctuaries. Charles Martel returned with much loot, and broke the power of the Frisian rulers for good. The Franks annexed the Frisian lands between the Vlie and the Lauwers. Although Frankish forces were victorious over the Frisians in campaigns described, the frontier regions adjoining Saxon territory likely remained outside firm Frankish control until the Saxon wars of the late eighth century.

==== Murder of Saint Boniface ====
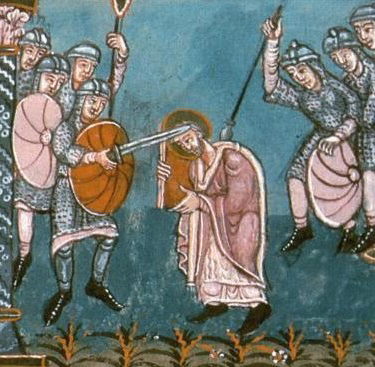
The attack on Boniface

The first Frisian bishop Boniface set out for Frisia in 754 with a small retinue. He baptized a great number and summoned a general meeting for confirmation at a place not far from Dokkum, between Franeker and Groningen. Instead of the converts he expected, a group of armed inhabitants appeared. They slewed the aged archbishop because, according to Boniface's hagiographer, they believed the chests he carried with him contained gold and other riches. They were dismayed when they discovered that the chest only contained the bishop's books.

==== Revolt of 782–785 ====
Under the leadership of Widukind the Saxons continued to resist the Franks. In 782 the Frisians east of the Lauwers also began a revolt against the Franks. The revolt expanded to Frisian lands in the west that had been pacified earlier. This led to an en masse return to paganism by the population. Marauders burned churches and the priests, including Ludger, had to flee south.

In response Charlemagne organized a new campaign in 783 to restore control, first over the Saxons and later over the Frisians. The Frisians aided Widukind against the Franks in 784 by sending him an army. It did not help much and he had to surrender in 785 and the Frisian revolt was severely repressed by the Franks.

==== Revolt of 793 ====
In 793 the Frisians rebelled for the last time against Charlemagne. The reason for this was the forceful recruiting of Frisians and Saxons for the war against the Avars in the east. Under the leadership of dukes Unno and Eilrad, a revolt arose east of the Lauwers and spread to other Frisian lands. This led to a temporary return to paganism, and again priests had to flee. This revolt was also suppressed by the Franks.
