= Frisian Kingdom =

c. 600–734 realm in northwestern Europe

Frisian Kingdom Fryske Keninkryk (West Frisian)
- c. 600–734
- The Frisian Realm. The Frisian Kingdom covered only several the western district, and ended in 719, or, at its latest 734.
- Capital: Dorestad; Traiectum (Utrecht)
- Common languages: Old Frisian
- Religion: Germanic paganism
- Demonym: Frisian
- Government: Monarchy
- King
  - c. 650 – c. 680: Aldgisl
  - c. 680–719: Redbad
  - 719–734: Poppo
- History
  - Established: c. 600
  - Disestablished: 734
- Currency: Sceat
Preceded by	Succeeded by
Germania	Francia
- Today part of: Netherlands; Germany; Belgium

The Frisian Kingdom (/ˈfriːʒən/; West Frisian: Fryske Keninkryk) is a modern name for the post-Roman Frisian realm in Western Europe in the period when it was at its largest (650–734). This dominion was ruled by kings and emerged in the mid-7th century and probably ended with the Battle of the Boarn in 734 when the Frisians were defeated by the Frankish Empire. It lay mainly in what is now the Netherlands and – according to some 19th century authors – extended from the Zwin near Bruges in Belgium to the Weser in Germany. The center of power was the city of Utrecht.

In medieval writings, the region is designated by the Latin term Frisia. There is a dispute among historians about the extent of this realm; There is no documentary evidence for the existence of a permanent central authority. Possibly, Frisia consisted of multiple petty kingdoms, which transformed in time of war to a unit to resist invading powers, and then headed by an elected leader, the primus inter pares. It is possible that Redbad established an administrative unit. Among the Frisians at that time, there was no feudal system.

== Pre-Migration Period ==
The ancient Frisii were living in the low-lying region between the Zuiderzee and the River Ems. In the Germanic pre-Migration Period (i.e., before c. AD 300) the Frisii and the related Chauci, Saxons, and Angles inhabited the Continental European coast from the Zuyder Zee to south Jutland. All of these peoples shared a common material culture, and so cannot be defined archaeologically. What little is known of these early Frisii and their kings is provided by a few Roman accounts about two Frisian kings visiting Rome in the 1st century: Malorix and Verritus. It has been postulated that by AD 400 the Frisii abandoned the land and disappeared from archeological records. However, recent excavations in the dunes of Kennemerland show clear evidence of a continuous habitation.

== Migration Period ==
Frisia suffered marine transgressions that made the land largely uninhabitable during the 3rd to 5th centuries. Whatever population may have remained dropped dramatically.

In the 6th century, Frisia received an influx of new settlers, mostly Angles, Saxons, and Jutes, who would come to be known as "Frisians" even though they were not necessarily descended from the ancient Frisii.

A legendary king of the Migration Period is Finn, associated with the Battle of Finnsburg. In the story, the young Danish prince Hnæf, was staying as an invited guest of the Frisian king Finn. For reasons unknown, a battle broke out between the two parties, probably started by the Frisian side, and Hnæf was killed. Hnæf's retainer Hengest took command, and the sides engaged in a peace treaty; but Hengest and the Danes later avenged Hnæf's death and slaughtered the Frisians. Some late 6th or early 7th-century coins in the Merovingian style survive that commemorate an obscure figure known as Audulf. Some Dutch historians consider him to have been a regional lord or king although he is otherwise unattested.

The Frisians consisted of tribes with loose bonds, centered on war bands but without great power. In the second half of the 7th century the Frisian kingship reached its maximum geographic development with its center of power in Dorestad.

== Social classes ==
The earliest Frisian records name four social classes, the ethelings (nobiles in Latin documents) and frilings, who together made up the "Free Frisians" who might bring suit at court, and the laten or liten with the slaves, who were absorbed into the laten during the Early Middle Ages, as slavery was not so much formally abolished, as evaporated. (Note: Homans describes Frisian social institutions, based on the summary by Siebs, Benno E. (1933). Grundlagen und Aufbau der altfriesischen Verfassung. Untersuchungen zur deutschen staats- und Rechtsgeschichte (in German). Vol. 144. Breslau: Marcus. OCLC 604057407. Siebs' synthesis was extrapolated from survivals detected in later medieval documents.) The laten were tenants of lands they did not own and might be tied to it in the manner of serfs, but in later times might buy their freedom.

== History of wars ==
The exact title of the Frisian rulers depends on the source. Frankish sources tend to call them dukes; other sources often call them kings. Only three Frisian rulers are named in contemporary written sources.

=== Aldgisl ===
Under the rule of the king Aldgisl, the Frisians came in conflict with the Frankish mayor of the palace Ebroin, over the old Roman border fortifications. Aldgisl could keep the Franks at a distance with his army. In 678 he welcomed the English bishop Wilfrid, who, like him, was not a friend of the Franks. While Wilfrid was at Aldegisel's court, Ebroin offered Aldegisel a bushel of gold coins in return for Wilfrid, alive or dead. Aldegisel himself is said to have torn up and burned the letter from the Frankish mayor in front of the ambassadors and his household. It has been surmised by some that Aldegisel's kindness to Wilfrid was a mode of defiance of Frankish domination. During his stay, Wilfrid attempted to convert the Frisians, who were still pagan at that time. Wilfrid's biographer says that most of the nobles converted, but the success was short-lived.

=== Redbad ===
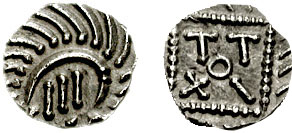
Frisian sceattas c.710–735

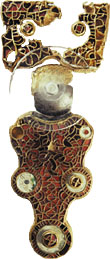
Great fibula of Winaam from the 7th century, found in 1953

In 680, Aldgisl died and was succeeded by his son Redbad, King of the Frisians. While Aldgisl had welcomed Christianity into his realm, Redbad attempted to extirpate the religion and free the Frisians from subjugation to the Merovingian kingdom of the Franks. In 689, however, Redbad was defeated by Pepin of Herstal in the battle of Dorestad and compelled to cede Frisia Citerior (Nearer Frisia) to the Franks.

The battle of Dorestad took place around 690 by the capital city of the Frisians close to the Rhine. The Franks were victorious in the battle under the Austrasian mayor of the palace, Pepin of Herstal. Dorestad and Utrecht fell into the hands of Pepin, this gave the Franks control of important trade routes on the Rhine to the North Sea. Following this defeat, Redbad retreated to the island of Heligoland. Willibrord, a student of Wilfred's, was sent to christianise the pagan Frisians at the request of Pepin, who had nominal suzerainty over the region. On 21 November 695 Pope Sergius I gave him a pallium and consecrated him as bishop of the Frisians. He returned to Frisia to preach and establish churches, among them a monastery at Utrecht, where he built his cathedral. Willibrord is counted the first Bishop of Utrecht. It is presumed that the influence of the Franks now reached from south of the Oude Rijn to the coast, but this is not entirely clear because the influence of the Frisians over the central river area was not entirely lost. In any case there was a Catholic Church mission to pagan Frisia with a monastery and episcopal see in Utrecht from 695, founded for Willibrord, and a marriage was arranged between Grimoald the Younger the oldest son of Pepin, and Thiadsvind, the daughter of Redbad, in 711.

After Pepin died, in 714, Redbad took advantage of the battle for succession in Francia and regained southern Frisia. He made a treaty with the Neustrasian mayor of the palace, Ragenfrid. In 716, the king of the Franks, Chilperic II, and Ragenfrid, the mayor of the palace of Neustria, invaded Austrasia to impose their will on the competing factions there: those of Theudoald and Plectrude, Pepin's heir and widow respectively, and those of Martel himself, newly escaped from Plectrude's Cologne prison and acclaimed mayor of the palace of Austrasia. Simultaneously Redbad, King of Frisia invaded Austrasia, forcing Saint Willibrord and his monks to flee, and allied with the king and the Neustrians. Outside of Cologne, held by Plectrude, an ill-prepared Charles Martel was defeated by Redbad, and forced to flee to the mountains of the Eifel. Cologne fell after a short siege to Chilperic, the Frisians and the Neustrians. Once in the mountains of the Eifel, Charles began to rally his supporters, and in short order was ready to do battle. Many Austrasians, under attack by Neustrians, Frisians, and Saxons in the northeast likely rallied behind Martel because he was the only surviving adult male of the Pippinnid family. His forces then attacked the army of Chilperic II and his allies at the Battle of Amblève near Amel as they returned triumphantly from Cologne. Martel used a feigned retreat, falling on his foes as they rested at midday, and feigning falling back to draw them fully out of a defensive position, where he defeated them, devastating the Frisian army. Willibrord was then joined by Boniface, an Anglo-Saxon bishop. They spent a year together attempting to convert the Frisians to Christianity, but their efforts were frustrated when Redbad retook possession of Frisia, burning churches and killing many missionaries. Willibrord and Boniface were forced to flee to the protection of Charles Martel. The Frisian army returned to the north with a large war loot. Redbad made plans to invade Francia for the second time and mobilised a large army, but before he could do this he died of an illness in 719. It is not certain who the successor of Redbad was. It is believed that there were troubles with the succession, because the Frankish opponent Charles Martel could easily invade Frisia and subjugate the land. The resistance was so weak that Charles Martel not only annexed Frisia Citerior ("nearer" Frisia south of the Rhine), but he also crossed the Rhine and annexed "farther" Frisia, to the banks of the river Vlie. Now protected by the Franks, Willibrord returned to Frisia.

=== Poppo ===
There was a rebellion against Frankish rule in the region of Westergo in 733, which Charles put down. The inhabitants gave hostages, converted to Christianity and recognised Frankish overlordship, but after Charles left they were punished by their fellow Frisians. The next year, the Frisians rebelled again, this time under the leadership of King Poppo. Charles gathered a large fleet and ferried an army across the Almere for a naval invasion. Initial landings on Westergo and Oostergo encountered no resistance, since Charles's aim was to bring Poppo to heel. This time no punitive measures were taken against the Frisians. Charles and Poppo's armies met on the banks of the river Boarn, perhaps at Oldeboorne, one of the Frisians' chief commercial centers at the time. The Franks appear to have coveted the trade that passed through there and through Domburg and Dorestad. The Frisians commanded by Poppo used boats to land their army and surprise the Franks. However the Franks had constructed a fortified encampment once on shore and the Frisian army was defeated in the Battle of the Boarn. Poppo was killed in combat and his army was pushed back to Eastergoa. The death of Poppo marked an important phase in the destruction of Frisian paganism. Charles ordered pagan shrines and sanctuaries to be destroyed and carried back to Francia "a great mass of spoils" (magna spolia et praeda).

The Franks annexed the Frisian lands between the Vlie and the Lauwers. In 752/753 Boniface wrote a letter to Pope Stephen II, in which it is said that Willibrord destroyed the Frisian pagan sanctuaries and temples. In the Life written by Alcuin are two texts about Willibrord and pagan places of worship. In one he arrived with his companions in Walcheren in the Netherlands where he smashed a sculpture of the ancient religion. In the second text passage Willibord arrived on an island called Fositesland (possibly Heligoland) where a pagan god named Fosite was worshipped. Here he despoiled this god of its sanctity by using the god's sacred well for baptisms and the sacred cattle for food. Emboldened by the success of the Frankish subjugation of Frisia, Boniface returned in 754 to once again attempt to convert the Frisians. He baptized a great number and summoned a general meeting for confirmation at a place not far from Dokkum, between Franeker and Groningen. Instead of the converts he expected, a group of armed inhabitants appeared. The Frisian warriors were angry because he had destroyed their shrines and slew the archbishop, looting his chests and destroying his books.

== After the Frankish conquest ==
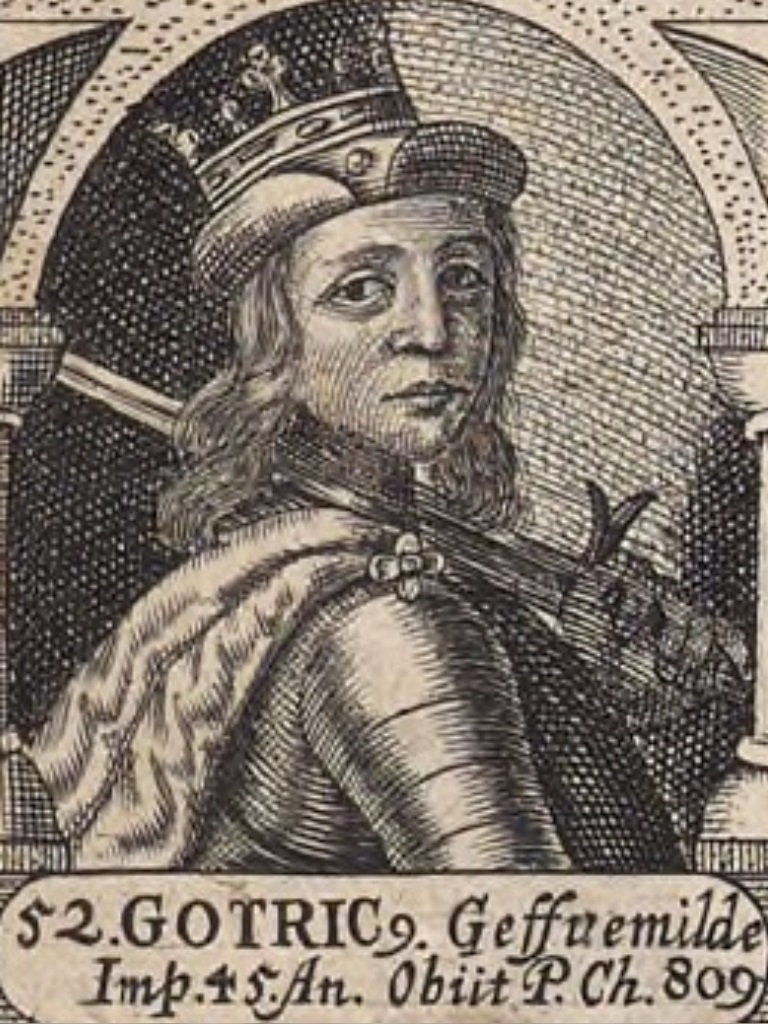
The Danish king Gudfred who in 810 let his fleet invade Frisia. 17th century engraving.

In 772, the Frankish king Charlemagne attacked the Frisians east of the Lauwers with a large army. He defeated them in several battles and so brought an end to the Frisian independence, expanding the Frankish Empire further to the east, where the Saxon Wars would begin. The Saxon leader Widukind organized resistance to the Franks, in 782 the Frisians east of the Lauwers also joined the uprising. The uprising expanded to Frisian lands in the west that had been pacified earlier. This led to an en masse return to paganism by the population, marauders burned churches and the priests had to flee south. The Carolingians conquered the area east of the Lauwers in 785, when Charlemagne defeated Widukind. They laid Frisia under the rule of grewan, a title that has been loosely related to count in its early sense of "governor" rather than "feudal overlord". Charlemagne eventually crushed this revolt, but faced another uprising by the Frisians in 793 - driven by the conscription of Frisians into the Frankish army. Under the leadership of dukes Unno and Eilrad, the uprising arose east of the Lauwers and spread to other Frisian lands. This again led to a temporary return to paganism, and again priests had to flee. This uprising was also suppressed by the Franks. During this time Charlemagne imposed the Lex Frisionum, a penal code which stratified Frisia into Nobility, Freemen, Serfs and Slaves.

In 810 the Danish king Gudfred let a fleet consisting of 200 ships invade Frisia, and claiming the territory as a part of his Danish kingdom. The Danish king though was shortly after the invasion killed by one of his own men, and his fleet withdrew to Denmark before it came to any clash with regular Frankish forces.

Frisia was granted to the Danish Viking Rorik of Dorestad between 841 and 880, followed by another Danish Viking Godfrid, Duke of Frisia until he was killed in 885. The area was subsequently under Gerolf of Holland.

Before 1101, sources talk about counts ruling over Frisia, west of the Vlie as Frisian counts. But in this year count Floris II is mentioned as Florentius comes de Hollant (Floris, Count of Holland). Holland is probably from the Old Dutch holt lant, literally "wood land", describing the district around Dordrecht, the nucleus of the County of Holland. The counts generally kept to this single title until 1291, when Floris V, Count of Holland decided to call himself Count of Holland and Zeeland, lord of Friesland. This title was also used after Holland was united with Hainault, Bavaria-Straubing, and the Duchy of Burgundy. The titles eventually lost their importance, and the last count, Philip II of Spain, only mentioned them halfway through his long list of titles.

== Bibliography ==
- Bachrach, Bernard (2001), Early Carolingian Warfare: Prelude to Empire, Philadelphia: University of Pennsylvania Press
- Costambeys, Marios; Innes, Matthew; MacLean, Simon (2011), The Carolingian World, Cambridge University Press
- Haywood, John (1999), Dark Age Naval Power: Frankish & Anglo-Saxon Seafaring Activity (revised ed.), Frithgarth: Anglo-Saxon Books, ISBN 1-898281-43-2
- Zocco, Nicola (2007), "The Episode of Finn in Beowulf. Discharging Hengest" (PDF), Linguistica e Filologia, 24: 65–83
