= Netherlands in the Early Middle Ages =

History of the Low Countries (Borders are imprecise)
Frisii		Belgae					
Frisii	Cana– nefates (Note: Roman foederati)	Chamavi, Tubantes (Note: The Chamavi merged into the confederation of the Franks; the Tubantes merged into the confederation of the Saxons.)		Gallia Belgica (55 BC–c. 5th century AD); Germania Inferior (83–c. 5th century)			
Frisii	Cana– nefates	Salian Franks		Batavi			
unpopulated (4th –c. 5th centuries)		Saxons	Salian Franks (4th–c. 5th centuries)				
Frisian Kingdom (c. 6th century – 734)		Saxons	Frankish Kingdom (481–843)—Carolingian Empire (800–843)				
Frisian Kingdom (c. 6th century – 734)		Austrasia (511–687)					
Middle Francia (843–855)				West; Francia (from 843)	Middle Francia (843–855)		
Kingdom of Lotharingia (Note: Part of East Francia after 939, divided in Upper Lorraine (as part of West Francia) and Lower Lorraine (as part of East Francia) in 959.) (855–959); Duchy of Lower Lorraine (Note: Lower Lorraine—also referred to as Lothier—disintegrated into several smaller independent territories and only the title of a "Duke of Lothier" remained, held by Brabant.) (from 959)			Kingdom of Lotharingia (855–959); Duchy of Lower Lorraine (from 959)	West; Francia (from 843)	Kingdom of Lotharingia (855–959); Duchy of Lower Lorraine (from 959)		
Frisia			Kingdom of Lotharingia (855–959); Duchy of Lower Lorraine (from 959)	County of Flanders (Note: Including County of Artois (part of Flanders until 1237) and Tournaisis.) (862–1384)	Kingdom of Lotharingia (855–959); Duchy of Lower Lorraine (from 959)		
Frisian; Freedom (Note: Lordship of Frisia and Lordship of Groningen (including the Ommelanden) after 1524 and 1536 respectively.) (11th–16th centuries)	County of Holland (Note: Including County of Zeeland, that was ruled by neighboring County of Holland and County of Flanders (until 1432).) (880–1432)	Bishopric of Utrecht (Note: Utrecht included Lordship of Overijssel (until 1528), County of Drenthe (until 1528) and County of Zutphen (until 1182).) (695–1456)	Duchy of Brabant (Note: Duchy of Brabant included since 1288 also the Duchy of Limburg (now part of Belgium's Liège Province) and the "Overmaas" lands Dalhem, Valkenburg and Herzogenrath (now part of the Dutch Province of Limburg).) (1183–1430) Duchy of Guelders (Note: The county, later duchy, of Guelders consisted of four quarters, as they were separated by rivers: situated upstream Upper Quarter (the present day northern half of the Dutch province of Limburg), spatially separated from the three downstream Lower Quarters: County of Zutphen (after 1182), Veluwe Quarter and Nijmegen Quarter. The three lower quarters emerged from the historic gau Hamaland (named after the Chamavi tribe), and formed the present day province of Gelderland. Guelders did not include the Cleves enclave Huissen and the independent counties of Buren and Culemborg, that were much later seceded to the province of Gelderland.) (1046–1543)	County of Flanders (862–1384)	County of Hainaut (1071–1432) County of Namur (981–1421)	Prince- Bishopric of Liège (Note: Throughout the Middle Ages, the bishopric was further expanded with the Duchy of Bouillon in 1096 (ceded to France in 1678), the acquisition of the county of Loon in 1366 and the county of Horne in 1568. The Lordship of Mechelen was also part of the Prince-Bishopric of Liège.)(980–1791)	Duchy of Luxembourg (1059–1443)
Frisian; Freedom (11th–16th centuries)	Burgundian Netherlands (1384–1482)					Prince- Bishopric of Liège (980–1791)	Burgundian Netherlands (1384–1482)
Habsburg Netherlands (1482–1795) (Seventeen Provinces after 1543) (Note: The name Seventeen Provinces came in use after the Habsburg emperor Charles V had re-acquired the Duchy of Guelders, and an continuous territory arose.)						Prince- Bishopric of Liège (980–1791)	Habsburg Netherlands (1482–1795) (Seventeen Provinces after 1543)
Dutch Republic (1581–1795)				Spanish Netherlands (1556–1714)		Prince- Bishopric of Liège (980–1791)	Spanish Netherlands (1556–1714)
Dutch Republic (1581–1795)				Austrian Netherlands (1714–1795)		Prince- Bishopric of Liège (980–1791)	Austrian Netherlands (1714–1795)
Dutch Republic (1581–1795)				United States of Belgium (1790)		Republic of Liège (1789–'91)	United States of Belgium (1790)
Dutch Republic (1581–1795)				Austrian Netherlands (1795–1797)		P.-Bish. of Liège (1791–1794)	Austrian Netherlands (1795–1797)
Batavian Republic (1795–1806); Kingdom of Holland (1806–1810)			associated with French First Republic (1795–1804) part of First French Empire (1804–1815)				
part of First French Empire (1810–1813)			associated with French First Republic (1795–1804) part of First French Empire (1804–1815)				
Sovereign Principality of the Netherlands (1813–1815)			associated with French First Republic (1795–1804) part of First French Empire (1804–1815)				
United Kingdom of the Netherlands (1815–1830)							Grand Duchy of Luxembourg (from 1815)
Kingdom of the Netherlands (from 1839)				Kingdom of Belgium (from 1830)			Grand Duchy of Luxembourg (from 1815)
Kingdom of the Netherlands (from 1839)				Kingdom of Belgium (from 1830)			Grand Duchy of Luxembourg (from 1890)

The Netherlands in the early Middle Ages was inhabited by various Germanic tribes, including the Frisians, who played a significant role in the development of the region and its Christianisation and eventual incorporation into the Frankish Empire.

The settlers in the northern Netherlands and northwest part of Germany established the Kingdom of the Frisians, adopting the name from the previous inhabitants, with the prosperous trading North Sea trading center of Dorestad playing a vital role. The Franks eventually conquered the area, although recently, doubt has been cast on how distinct they in fact were from other Germanic groups such as the Frisians and Saxons.

== Frisians ==
Map showing roughly the distribution of Franks and Frisians c. 716.

As climatic conditions improved, there was another mass migration of Germanic peoples into the area from the east. This is known as the "Migration Period" (Volksverhuizingen). The northern Netherlands received an influx of new migrants and settlers, mostly Saxons, but also Angles and Jutes. Many of these migrants did not stay in the northern Netherlands but moved on to England and are known today as the Anglo-Saxons. The newcomers who stayed in the northern Netherlands would eventually be referred to as "Frisians", although they were not descended from the ancient Frisii. These new Frisians settled in the northern Netherlands and would become the ancestors of the modern Frisians. (Because the early Frisians and Anglo-Saxons were formed from largely identical tribal confederacies, their respective languages were very similar. Old Frisian is the most closely related language to Old English and the modern Frisian dialects are in turn the closest related languages to contemporary English.) By the end of the 6th century, the Frisian territory in the northern Netherlands had expanded west to the North Sea coast and, by the 7th century, south to Dorestad. During this period most of the northern Netherlands was known as Frisia. This extended Frisian territory is sometimes referred to as Frisia Magna (or Greater Frisia).

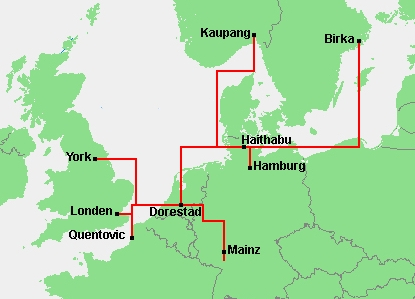
Dorestad and main traderoutes.

In the 7th and 8th centuries, the Frankish chronologies mention this area as the kingdom of the Frisians. This kingdom comprised the coastal provinces of the Netherlands and the German North Sea coast. During this time, the Frisian language was spoken along the entire southern North Sea coast. The 7th-century Frisian Kingdom (650–734) under King Aldegisel and King Redbad, had its centre of power in Utrecht.

Dorestad was the largest settlement (emporia) in northwestern Europe. It had grown around a former Roman fortress. It was a large, flourishing trading place, three kilometers long and situated where the rivers Rhine and Lek diverge southeast of Utrecht near the modern town of Wijk bij Duurstede. Although inland, it was a North Sea trading centre that primarily handled goods from the Middle Rhineland. Wine was among the major products traded at Dorestad, likely from vineyards south of Mainz. It was also widely known because of its mint. Between 600 and around 719 Dorestad was often fought over between the Frisians and the Franks.

== Franks ==
Expansion of the Franks from 481 to 870.

After Roman government in the area collapsed, the Franks expanded their territories until there were numerous small Frankish kingdoms, especially at Cologne, Tournai, Le Mans and Cambrai. The kings of Tournai eventually came to subdue the other Frankish kings. By the 490s, Clovis I had conquered and united all the Frankish territories to the west of the Meuse, including those in the southern Netherlands. He continued his conquests into Gaul.

After the death of Clovis I in 511, his four sons partitioned his kingdom amongst themselves, with Theuderic I receiving the lands that were to become Austrasia (including the southern Netherlands). A line of kings descended from Theuderic ruled Austrasia until 555, when it was united with the other Frankish kingdoms of Chlothar I, who inherited all the Frankish realms by 558. He redivided the Frankish territory amongst his four sons, but the four kingdoms coalesced into three on the death of Charibert I in 567. Austrasia (including the southern Netherlands) was given to Sigebert I. The southern Netherlands remained the northern part of Austrasia until the rise of the Carolingians.

The Franks who expanded south into Gaul settled there and eventually adopted the Vulgar Latin of the local population. However, a Germanic language was spoken as a second tongue by public officials in western Austrasia and Neustria as late as the 850s. It completely disappeared as a spoken language from these regions during the 10th century. During this expansion to the south, many Frankish people remained in the north (i.e. southern Netherlands, Flanders and a small part of northern France). A widening cultural divide grew between the Franks remaining in the north and the rulers far to the south in what is now France. Salian Franks continued to reside in their original homeland and the area directly to the south and to speak their original language, Old Frankish, which by the 9th century had evolved into Old Dutch. A Dutch-French language boundary came into existence (but this was originally south of where it is today). In the Maas and Rhine areas of the Netherlands, the Franks had political and trading centres, especially at Nijmegen and Maastricht. These Franks remained in contact with the Frisians to the north, especially in places like Dorestad and Utrecht.

== Modern doubts about the traditional Frisian, Frank and Saxon distinction ==
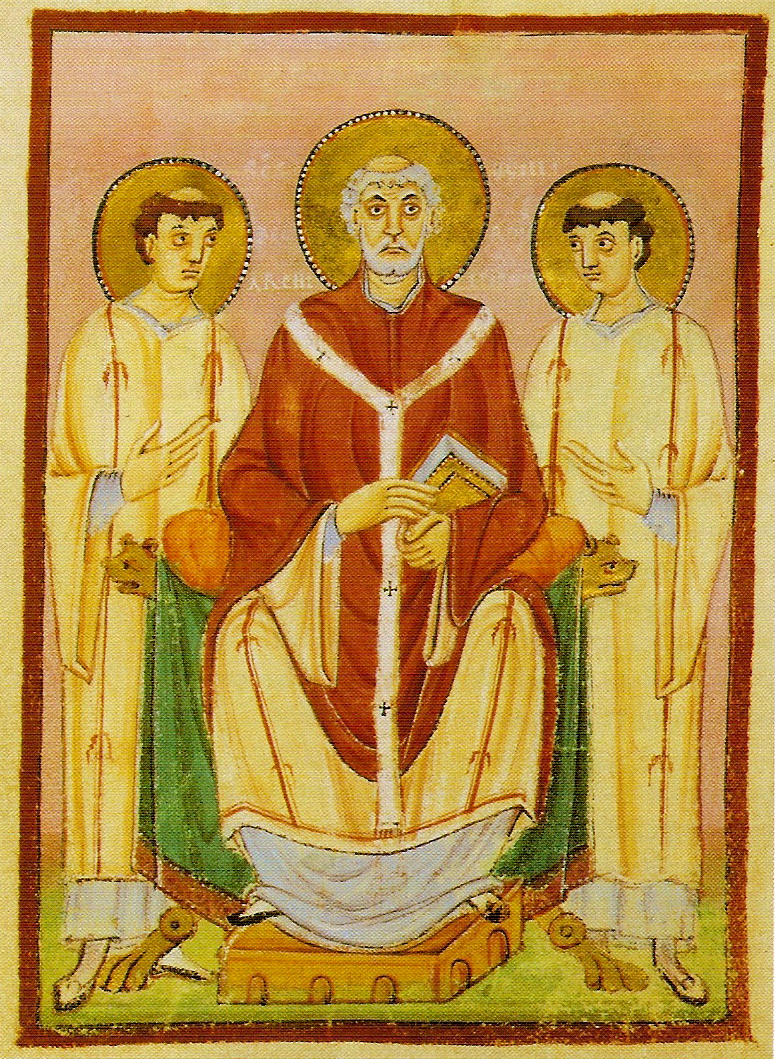
Saint Willibrord, Anglo-Saxon missionary from Northumberland, Apostle to the Frisians, first bishop of Utrecht.

In the late 19th century, Dutch historians believed that the Franks, Frisians, and Saxons were the original ancestors of the Dutch people. Some went further by ascribing certain attributes, values and strengths to these various groups and proposing that they reflected 19th-century nationalist and religious views. In particular, it was believed that this theory explained why Belgium and the southern Netherlands (i.e. the Franks) had become Catholic and the northern Netherlands (Frisians and Saxons) had become Protestant. The success of this theory was partly due to anthropological theories based on a tribal paradigm. Being politically and geographically inclusive, and yet accounting for diversity, this theory was in accordance with the need for nation-building and integration during the 1890–1914 period. The theory was taught in Dutch schools.

However, the disadvantages of this historical interpretation became apparent. This tribal-based theory suggested that external borders were weak or non-existent and that there were clear-cut internal borders. This origins myth provided an historical premise, especially during the Second World War, for regional separatism and annexation to Germany. After 1945 the tribal paradigm lost its appeal for anthropological scholars and historians. When the accuracy of the three-tribe theme was fundamentally questioned, the theory fell out of favour.

Due to the scarcity of written sources, knowledge of this period depends to a large degree on the interpretation of archaeological data. The traditional view of a clear-cut division between Frisians in the north and coast, Franks in the south and Saxons in the east has proven historically problematic. Archeological evidence suggests dramatically different models for different regions, with demographic continuity for some parts of the country and depopulation and possible replacement in other parts, notably the coastal areas of Frisia and Holland. Its uncertain which language gave rise to Old Dutch, but it is believed to have been spoken by the Salian Franks and is similar to other Germanic languages. However, the development of Old Dutch is poorly understood as there are few surviving texts in Old Dutch or the language spoken by the Franks. Old Dutch made the transition to Middle Dutch around 1150.

Christianity arrived in the Netherlands with the Romans and continued in Maastricht even after the withdrawal of the Romans, while the Franks became Christians after Clovis I converted to Catholicism in 496. Hiberno-Scottish and Anglo-Saxon missionaries have also played an important role in converting the Frankish and Frisian peoples to Christianity by the 8th century.

== Frankish dominance and incorporation into the Holy Roman Empire ==
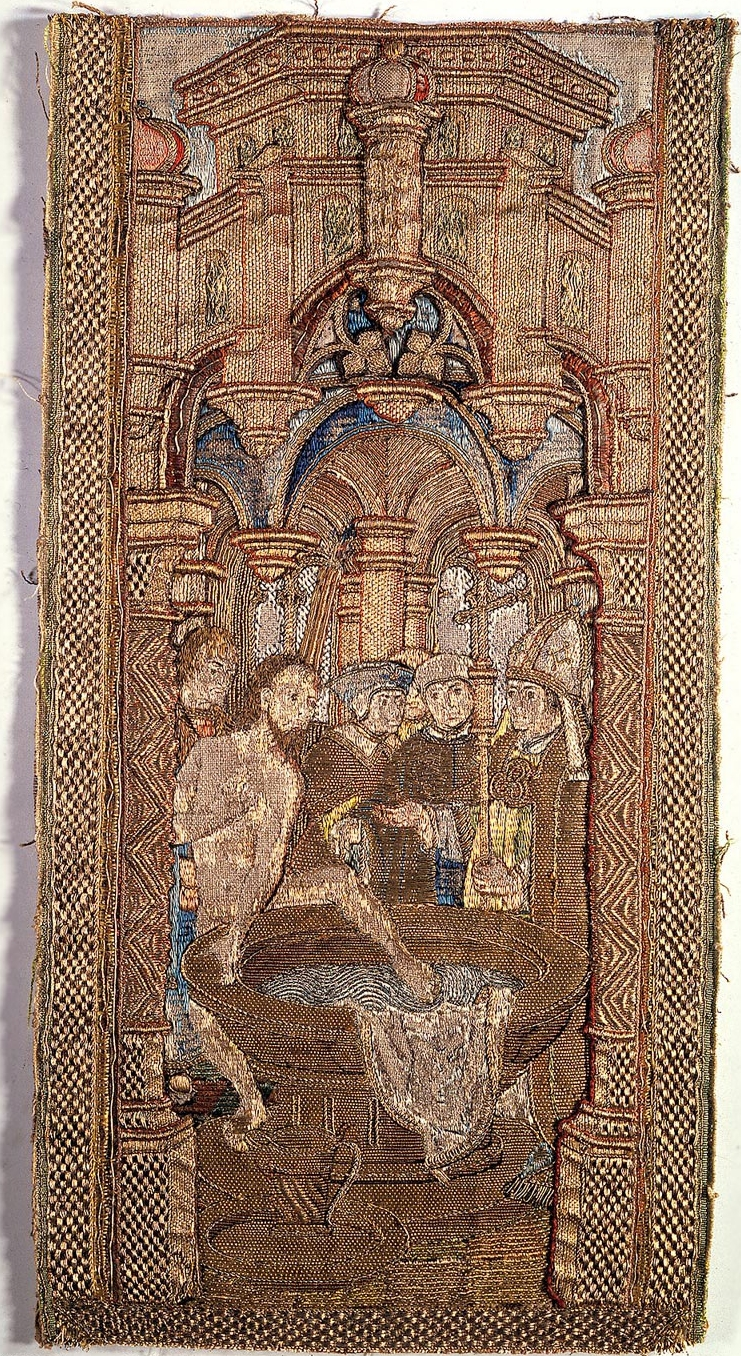
An early 16th-century tapestry depicting the near baptism of Redbad, King of the Frisians, who died in 719.

In the early 8th century the Frisians came increasingly into conflict with the Franks to the south, resulting in a series of wars in which the Frankish Empire eventually subjugated Frisia. In 734, at the Battle of the Boarn, the Frisians in the Netherlands were defeated by the Franks, who thereby conquered the area west of the Lauwers. The Franks then conquered the area east of the Lauwers in 785 when Charlemagne defeated Widukind.

The linguistic descendants of the Franks, the modern Dutch -speakers of the Netherlands and Flanders, seem to have broken with the endonym "Frank" around the 9th century. By this time Frankish identity had changed from an ethnic identity to a national identity, becoming localized and confined to the modern Franconia and principally to the French province of Île-de-France.

Although the people no longer referred to themselves as "Franks", the Netherlands was still part of the Frankish empire of Charlemagne. Indeed, because of the Austrasian origins of the Carolingians in the area between the Rhine and the Maas, the cities of Aachen, Maastricht, Liège and Nijmegen were at the heart of Carolingian culture. Charlemagne maintained his palatium in Nijmegen at least four times.

The Carolingian Empire would eventually include France, Germany, northern Italy and much of Western Europe. In 843, the Frankish empire was divided into three parts, giving rise to West Francia in the west, East Francia in the east, and Middle Francia in the centre. Most of what is today the Netherlands became part of Middle Francia; Flanders became part of West Francia. This division was an important factor in the historical distinction between Flanders and the other Dutch-speaking areas.

Middle Francia (Latin: Francia media) was an ephemeral Frankish kingdom that had no historical or ethnic identity to bind its varied peoples. It was created by the Treaty of Verdun in 843, which divided the Carolingian Empire among the sons of Louis the Pious. Situated between the realms of East and West Francia, Middle Francia comprised the Frankish territory between the rivers Rhine and Scheldt, the Frisian coast of the North Sea, the former Kingdom of Burgundy (except for a western portion, later known as Bourgogne), Provence and the Kingdom of Italy.

Middle Francia fell to Lothair I, the eldest son and successor of Louis the Pious, after an intermittent civil war with his younger brothers Louis the German and Charles the Bald. In acknowledgement of Lothair's Imperial title, Middle Francia contained the imperial cities of Aachen, the residence of Charlemagne, as well as Rome. In 855, on his deathbed at Prüm Abbey, Emperor Lothair I again partitioned his realm amongst his sons. Most of the lands north of the Alps, including the Netherlands, passed to Lothair II and consecutively were named Lotharingia. After Lothair II died in 869, Lotharingia was partitioned by his uncles Louis the German and Charles the Bald in the Treaty of Meerssen in 870. Although some of the Netherlands had come under Viking control, in 870 it technically became part of East Francia, which became the Holy Roman Empire in 962.

== Viking raids ==
In the 9th and 10th centuries, the Vikings raided the largely defenceless Frisian and Frankish towns lying on the coast and along the rivers of the Low Countries. Although Vikings never settled in large numbers in those areas, they did set up long-term bases and were even acknowledged as lords in a few cases. In Dutch and Frisian historical tradition, the trading centre of Dorestad declined after Viking raids from 834 to 863; however, since no convincing Viking archaeological evidence has been found at the site (as of 2007), doubts about this have grown in recent years.

One of the most important Viking families in the Low Countries was that of Rorik of Dorestad (based in Wieringen) and his brother the "younger Harald" (based in Walcheren), both thought to be nephews of Harald Klak. Around 850, Lothair I acknowledged Rorik as ruler of most of Friesland. And again in 870, Rorik was received by Charles the Bald in Nijmegen, to whom he became a vassal. Viking raids continued during that period. Harald's son Rodulf and his men were killed by the people of Oostergo in 873. Rorik died sometime before 882.

Buried Viking treasures consisting mainly of silver have been found in the Low Countries. Two such treasures have been found in Wieringen. A large treasure found in Wieringen in 1996 dates from around 850 and is thought perhaps to have been connected to Rorik. The burial of such a valuable treasure is seen as an indication that there was a permanent settlement in Wieringen.

Around 879, Godfrid arrived in Frisian lands as the head of a large force that terrorised the Low Countries. Using Ghent as his base, they ravaged Ghent, Maastricht, Liège, Stavelot, Prüm, Cologne, and Koblenz. Controlling most of Frisia between 882 and his death in 885, Godfrid became known to history as Godfrid, Duke of Frisia. His lordship over Frisia was acknowledged by Charles the Fat, to whom he became a vassal. Godfried was assassinated in 885, after which Gerolf of Holland assumed lordship and Viking rule of Frisia came to an end.

Viking raids of the Low Countries continued for over a century. Remains of Viking attacks dating from 880 to 890 have been found in Zutphen and Deventer. In 920, King Henry of Germany liberated Utrecht. According to a number of chronicles, the last attacks took place in the first decade of the 11th century and were directed at Tiel and/or Utrecht.

These Viking raids occurred about the same time that French and German lords were fighting for supremacy over the middle empire that included the Netherlands, so their sway over this area was weak. Resistance to the Vikings, if any, came from local nobles, who gained in stature as a result.
