= Redbad (film) =

2018 film

- Film poster
- Directed by: Roel Reiné
- Written by: Alex van Galen
- Produced by: Roel Reiné; Klaas de Jong
- Starring: Gijs Naber
- Cinematography: Roel Reiné
- Edited by: Radu Ion
- Music by: Trevor Morris
- Production companies: Farmhouse Film & TV
- Distributed by: Splendid Film
- Release date: 28 June 2018
- Running time: 160 minutes
- Country: Netherlands
- Languages: Dutch; English
- Budget: €8 million
- Box office: $482,992

Redbad is a 2018 Dutch drama film directed by Roel Reiné. It is based on the life of Radbod, an early medieval Frisian leader. The film was intended as the middle part of a trilogy about iconic Dutch/Frisian heroes, starting with the film Michiel de Ruyter, about the 17th century admiral Michiel de Ruyter, and ending with an unmade film about William of Orange.

== Cast ==
- Gijs Naber as Redbad, King of the Frisians
- Jonathan Banks as Pepin of Herstal
- Huub Stapel as Aldgisl
- Søren Malling as Wihtlæg
- Renée Soutendijk as Idwina
- Lisa Smit as Fenne
- Loes Haverkort as Frea
- Egber-Jan Weeber as Saint Boniface
- Tibo Vandenborre as Charles Martel
- Britte Lagcher as Thiadsvind
- Jack Wouterse as Willibrord
- Daphne Wellens as Plectrude
- Teun Kuilboer as Jurre
- Derek de Lint as Eibert
- Mark van Eeuwen as Wulf
- Birgit Schuurman as Healer
- Gene Bervoets as Thierry
- Martijn Fischer as Gebbe

== Production ==
=== Casting ===
In August 2017, Gijs Naber was announced as the lead actor, and Huub Stapel would play Redbad's father Frysian king Aldgisl Soon afterward it was confirmed that Derek de Lint, Egbert-Jan Weber, Loes Haverkort, Lisa Smit, Martijn Fischer, Tuin Keulboer, Aus Greidanus sr., Jack Wouterse, Renée Soutendijk and Birgit Schuurman were all cast and in October 2017 actor, Jonathan Banks was also cast for the film.

=== Filming ===
The film was shot in the prehistoric village-museum in Eindhoven, De Alde Feanen National Park, Ameland, Moddergat, the Wadden Sea, Denmark, the German city of Wallsbüll and the Bouillon Castle in Belgium. The film was shot in 42 days and used more than 10,000 extras, which is a record amount for a Dutch production. The final shooting day was on 19 November 2017. The sound for film movie was produced by Dolby Atmos.

Before the film's release it was already sold to multiple countries and territories, among them Germany, France, China, Spain, Turkey, South Korea, Poland, Romania, Hungary, Slovakia, the Czech Republic, the Middle East and the Commonwealth of Independent States. In February Epic Pictures Group bought the North American distribution rights. Early test footage of the film was shown on 31 March and 1 April at Dutch Comic Con in the Jaarbeurs in Utrecht.

=== Trailer controversy ===
In May 2018, the producers of the film announced that YouTube and Facebook had sent an email to them that they would not show the trailer of the film on their platforms because it was considered offensive to large groups of people. Producer Klaas de Jong also mentioned he got hundreds of angry mails from Christians who did not agree with their depiction of historical events.

== Release ==
=== Box office ===
The film premiered on 23 June 2018, in an open air screening on the Wilhelminasquare in Leeuwarden, as part of the celebrations around the European Capital of Culture, a week later, on 28 June, it was released in cinemas nationwide. After its first month it only earned €332,785 back from its 8 million euro budget, making it the biggest box office bomb in the country's history. The producers of the film claimed this was because the warm weather and World Cup kept the public outside of cinemas. The film was released in 4DX in two Pathé-cinemas in Amsterdam and Rotterdam, making it the first Dutch film released in 4DX. Seven weeks after its release it was already moved to video on demand-platform Pathé Thuis. This was at the time the shortest window between a theatre release and home release for a big Dutch production, which normally takes a period of three months. The film was also later edited into a four-part television miniseries, where they showed unused footage of the film.

=== Critical response ===
The film received overwhelmingly negative reviews from the major Dutch newspapers. The Algemeen Dagblad said that everything in this movie takes too long, “the fight scenes, the introductions of the characters and the explanatory dialogue slow down the movie”. De Volkskrant gave it two stars, praising the fight scenes but finding the screenplay clearly lacking in logic and tension. NRC Handelsblad said the movie was weighed down by a very top-heavy screenplay and an over reliance on drama. Trouw praised actor Gijs Naber but complained about the awful dialogue which was clearly written from a 21st-century perspective. De Telegraaf while praising the ambition of the movies said that it takes too long and is overly reliant on close-ups and slow motion-scenes. They also praised Jonathan Banks in his role and remarked that it looked as if actor Jack Wouterse was in a completely different movie. Het Parool praised the fact that director Roel Reine put his own signature on the film and that the troubled production was barely noticeable. However they do mention that it is sometimes noticeable that they did not have enough extras in some of the fight scenes.

=== Historical inaccuracies ===
In an article by Asing Walthaus of the Leeuwarder Courant, historian Han Nijdam noted several historical inaccuracies. He pointed out that the castle in the film and the knights with chainmail armour are from the Late Middle Ages and not from the Early Middle Ages that the film depicts. He also complained that the film portrays the Frysians as barbarians in animal hides living in leaking huts even though it is proven that they lived in wooden houses with woven tapestries on their walls. It was his conclusion that the film puts spectacle over any form of historical accuracy.

=== Awards and nominations ===
The film was selected for the international Look-competition of the Ostend Film Festival. In July 2018, it was one of nine films shortlisted by the EYE film institute to be the Dutch entry for the Best Foreign Language Film at the 91st Academy Awards, but it was not selected. The film played at the Netherlands Film Festival but was, to the surprise of some major newspapers, not nominated for any Golden Calves.

=== YouTube lawsuit ===
In November 2018, the producers of the film announced that they would be suing YouTube for 200,000 euros because illegal copies of the film were viewed half a million times on the website.
