= Adelbold =

Legendary duke of Frisia (r. 173–187)

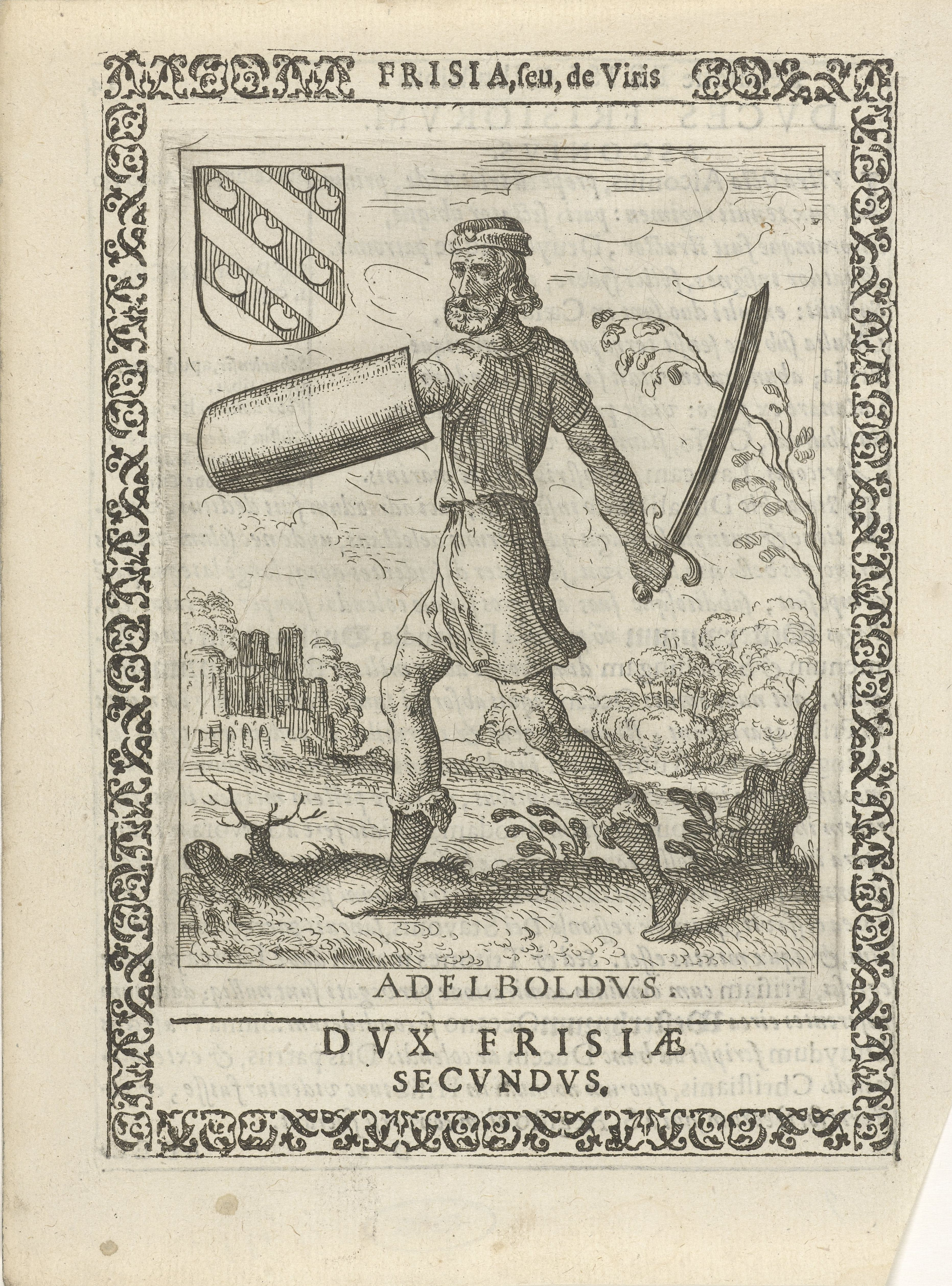
Adelbold from the series Koningen en Potestaten van Friesland by Pieter Feddes van Harlingen, 1620

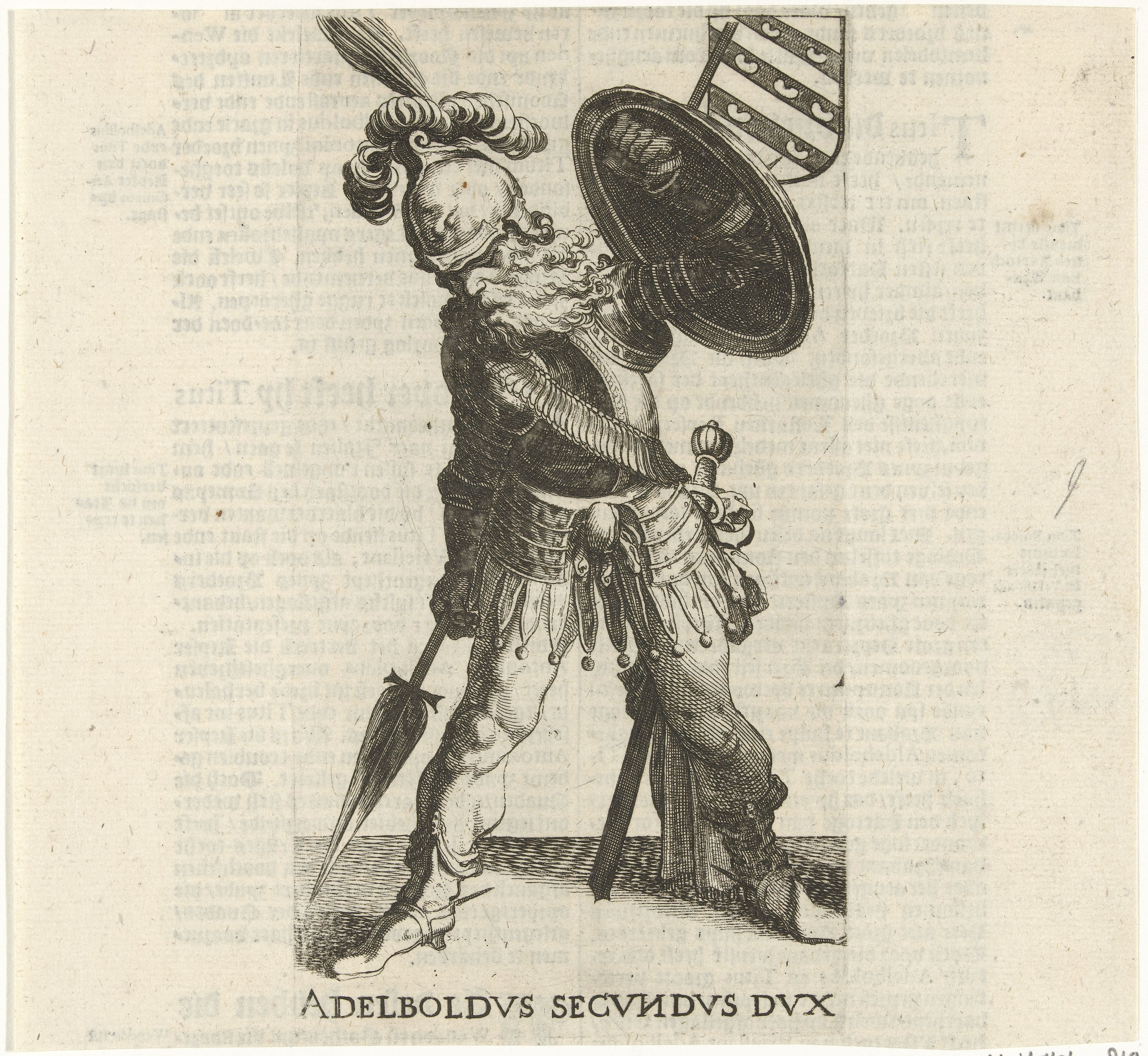
Adelbold from the series Friese heersers by Simon Frisius, 1622

Adelbold was the second Duke of Frisia (ruled 173–187), according to apocryphal works and pseudo-histories of Frisian historiography, which were common from the Middle Ages up to the nineteenth century. He is considered a a wholly mythical ruler of Frisia.

== Legend ==
According to the 17th century chronicle of Martinus Hamconius, Frisia seu de viris rebusque illustribus, Adelbold, the second duke of Frisia, a son of Asconius (ruled 130-173), was a very unruly, warlike man, who kept himself busy creating trouble between his neighbours and starting wars. He created battle schools, where Frisian boys of 15 years and older were educated in weaponry. He sent his bastard brother, Titus Bojocalis, with auxiliary troops in the army of Emperor Marcus Aurelius against the Vandals. A group of 1500 Vandals went west to the borders of Denmark, which was at the time larger than it is now, but were driven away, after which they went south over Elbe and Weser towards Frisia. They had already reached the Eem when the Frisians appeared with all their power to prevent the enemy crossing the river. When both armies faced each other across the river, Titus Bojocalis, together with eight hundred men, crossed the Eem higher up the river and unexpectedly attacked the enemy, killing many of them and driving the remainder into the river. About four hundred of them crossed by swimming, but Adelbold killed most of them.

Adelbold, who contracted a debilitating disease after this victory, proposed that the Frisians appoint Titus as commander-in-chief in his stead. And so it came to be that Titus was elected Duke of the Frisians in 187. Shortly after he was thus promoted, Adelbold again regained his good health. Titus wanted to hand him the government back, but Adelbold, who seemed to have lost his war-like character along with his disease, rejected the offer and continued the rest of his life quietly. He died in 208.

== See also ==
- Friso, mythical first king the Frisians, said to have ruled around 300 BC
- Oera Linda Book, a nineteenth century hoax manuscript of purported Frisian history
