= Unno (name) =

Unno is a name. Notable people with the name include:

- Unno, East Frisian duke
- Tadataka Unno (born 1980), Japanese jazz pianist
- Taitetsu Unno (1929–2014), Japanese scholar

== See also ==
- Unno Juza, pen name of Sano Shōichi
