= Battle of Dorestad =

C695 battle

- Part of the Frisian–Frankish wars
Date	Around 695
Location	Dorestad
Result	Frankish victory

Belligerents
Franks	Frisians

Commanders and leaders
Pepin of Herstal; Mayor of the palace	King Redbad

The Battle of Dorestad was a 7th-century battle between the Franks and the Frisians. The battle took place around 695 by the capital city of the Frisians close to the Rhine. The Franks were victorious in the battle under the Austrasian mayor of the palace, Pepin of Herstal. Though not all the consequences of the battle are clear, Dorestad became Frankish again as did the castles of Utrecht and Fechten. It is presumed that the influence of the Franks then reached from south of the Oude Rijn to the coast, but this is not entirely clear because the influence of the Frisians over the central river area was not entirely lost.
