= Friso =

Legendary Frisian king

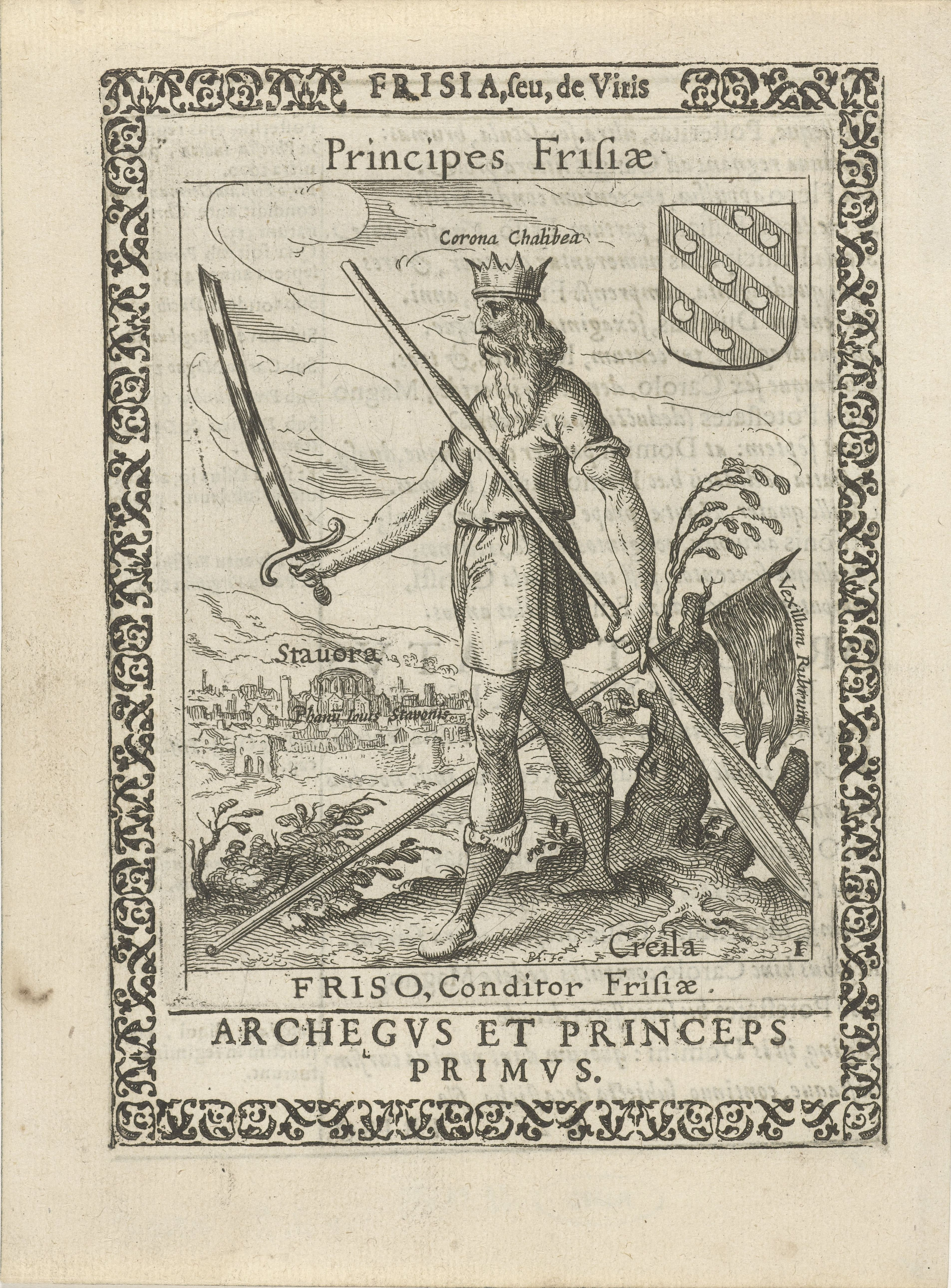

Friso is a legendary king of the Frisians who is said to have ruled around 300 BC. According to Martinus Hamconius in his 17th-century chronicle Frisia seu de viris rebusque illustribus, and also the 19th-century hoax Oera Linda Book, Friso was a leader of a group of Frisian colonists who had been settled in the Punjab for well over a millennium when they were discovered by Alexander the Great. Taking service with Alexander, Friso and the colonists eventually found their way back to their ancestral homeland of Frisia, where Friso founded a dynasty of kings.

Another legend has it that a red banner owned by Friso, called the Magnusvaan, is hidden at the church Almenum.
