= Bubo, Duke of the Frisians =

Duke of the Frisians (died 734)

Bubo (died 734), also spelled Bobbo, Poppo or Popo, was the pagan duke (dux) of the Frisians in the early eighth century. He is the first ruler whose name is known after Radbod (died 719). He did not recognise Frankish supremacy, and his territory probably only encompassed the north of Radbod's Frisia. He was defeated in a short war by the forces of Charles Martel, the duke of the Franks, in the Battle of the Boorne. The Frankish chroniclers, such as the Continuations of Fredegar, Vita Willibroridi of Alcuin and the Annales Mettenses priores, depict Bubo as a rebel and the Frankish invasion as a just war.

There was a rebellion—probably not led by Bubo—against Frankish rule in the region of Westergo in 733, which Charles put down. The inhabitants gave hostages, converted to Christianity and recognised Frankish overlordship, but after Charles left they were punished by their fellow Frisians. The next year (734), the Frisians rebelled again, this time under Bubo's leadership. Charles gathered a large fleet and army and prepared a naval invasion. Initial landings on Westergo and Ostergo encountered no resistance, since Charles's aim was to bring Bubo to heel. This time no punitive measures were taken against the Frisians. Charles and Bubo's armies met on the banks of the river Boorne, perhaps at Oldeboorne, one of the Frisians' chief commercial centers at the time. The Franks appear to have coveted the trade that passed through there and through Domburg and Dorestad (which they already possessed). The Franks constructed a fortified encampment (castra) once on shore and the Frisian army was defeated. Bubo was killed in combat.

The death of Bubo marked an important phase in the destruction of Frisian paganism. Charles ordered the shrines (fana) to be destroyed and carried back to Francia "a great mass of spoils" (magna spolia et praeda). The Latin title victor given him by the chroniclers may indicate that he celebrated a Roman-style triumph on his return home.

== Sources ==
- Bachrach, Bernard (2001). Early Carolingian Warfare: Prelude to Empire. University of Pennsylvania Press.
- Costambeys, Marios; Innes, Matthew; MacLean, Simon (2011). The Carolingian World. Cambridge University Press.
- Halbertsma, H. (2000). Het rijk van de Friese koningen, opkomst en ondergang. Utrecht.
- Lewis, A. R. (1976). "The Dukes in the Regnum Francorum, A.D. 550–751". Speculum. 51 (3): 381–410. doi:10.2307/2851704. JSTOR 2851704. S2CID 162248053.
- Wood, Ian N. (1994). The Merovingian Kingdoms, 450–751. London: Longman.
