= Eilrad =

Eilrad was a Frisian Duke from the medieval shire Rüstringen.

In 793 carried Eilrad with Unno, another leader, the Frisians in their revolt against the Frankish Empire from Charlemagne. This rebellion resulted that the Frisians temporarily fell back to their old pagan religion. Christian missionaries as Liudger were forced to flee and had to find a safe haven in the south of the Franks. Unlike the great revolt of 783-784 the Frisian revolt remained restricted to the area east of the Lauwers and was beaten down that same year.

== See also ==
- Unno

== Sources ==
Herre Halbertsma, Het rijk van de Friese koningen, opkomst en ondergang, Utrecht, 2000, pag. 310.
