= Battle of Cologne =

716 battle in modern Germany

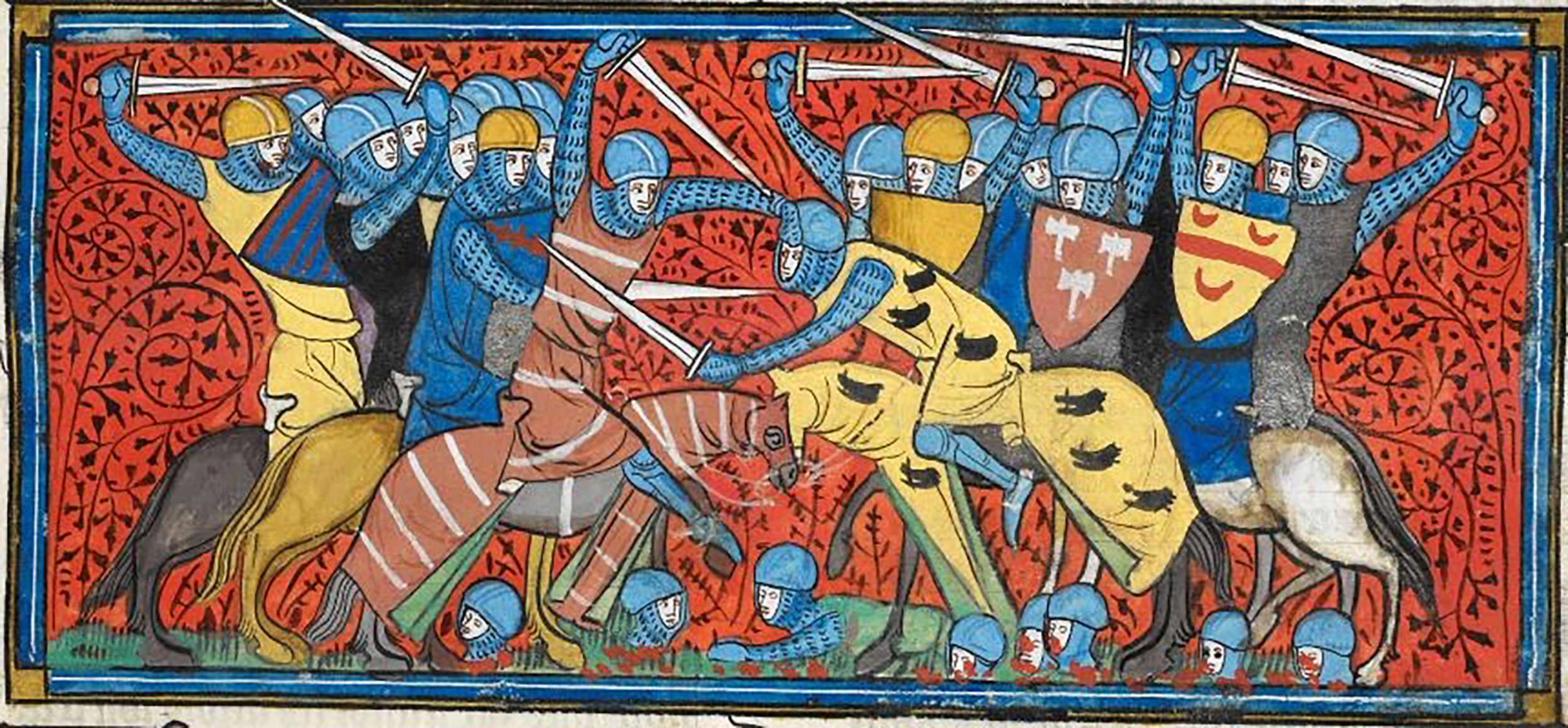
- Battle of Cologne in a copy of the late medieval Grandes Chroniques de France (London, British Library, Royal MS 16 G VI)
Date	716
Location	Cologne 50°56′33″N 6°57′32″E
Result	Neustria-Frisian victory

Belligerents
Austrasia	Neustria; Frisians

Commanders and leaders
Charles Martel	Chilperic II; Redbad, King of the Frisians
- Location within North Rhine-Westphalia Battle of Cologne (Germany) Battle of Cologne (Europe)

The Battle of Cologne was fought near the city of Köln (English: Cologne) (now part of Germany) in 716. The battle is known chiefly as the first battle of Charles Martel's command and was his only defeat.

In 716 King of the Franks Chilperic II and Mayor of the Palace Ragenfrid invaded Austrasia to impose their will on the competing factions there: those of Mayor of the Palace Theudoald and Neustrian regent Plectrude. Charles Martel had been imprisoned at Cologne by Plectrude, and following his escape he was acclaimed mayor of the palace of Austrasia. Simultaneously Radbod, King of Frisia, invaded Austrasia and allied with Chilperic and the Neustrians.

Outside of Cologne, which was held by Plectrude, an ill-prepared Charles Martel was defeated by Radbod and forced to flee to the mountains of the Eifel. Cologne fell after a short siege. The Neustrians compelled Plectrude to acknowledge Chilperic as king.

Once in the mountains of the Eifel, Charles began to rally his supporters, and in short order he was ready to do battle. He fell on the army of Chilperic II, and at the Battle of Amblève near Amel as they returned triumphantly from Cologne, he crushed their army.

== Literature ==
- Oman, Charles. (1914). The Dark Ages 476–918. Rivingtons: London.
