= Martinus Hamconius =

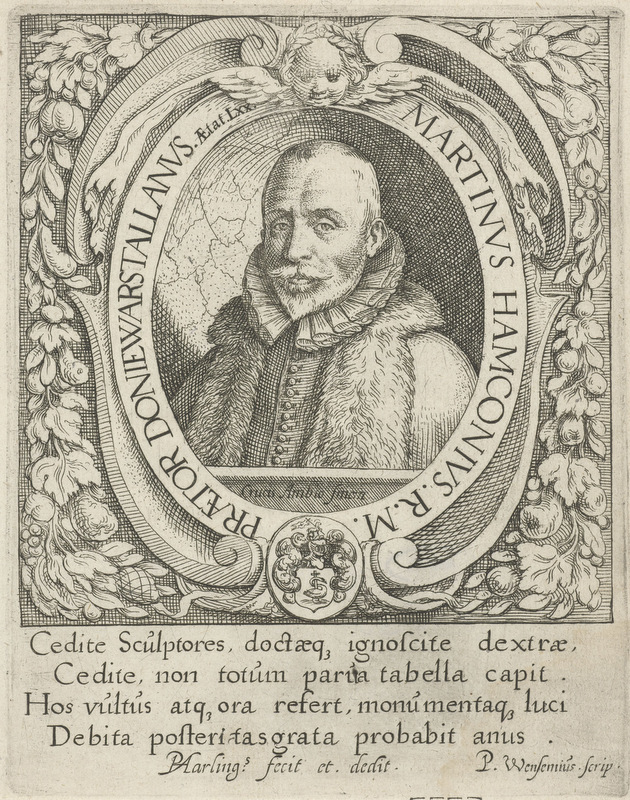
- Portrait by Arnoud van Halen, c. 1700
- Born: Maarten Hamckema c. 1550; Follega, Friesland
- Died: 1620 (aged 69–70)
- Occupations: Writer, poet, historian
- Writing career
- Pen name: Martinus Hamconius

Maarten Hamckema (c. 1550 in Follega – 1620), sometimes anglicized as Marten Hamkes and mainly known by his pen name Martinus Hamconius, was a Frisian writer, poet and historian best known for his apocryphal history books on the Kingdom of Frisia.
