= Audulf =

Audulf (Latin: Audulfus) was a Frisian active c. 600, just after the Great Migration Period. He is not mentioned by any historians of the era but several gold coins have been found inscribed with his name, leading to debate as to whether he was a petty king in Frisia—the former lands of the Frisii on the coastline of the northern Netherlands and northwestern Germany—or simply a Frisian moneyer, probably in the employ of the Merovingian Franks.

== Name ==
The name appears to be an Old Dutch form of the Germanic names related to Adolf, various compounds ultimately derived from Proto-Germanic *aþalaz ("noble") and *wulfaz ("wolf"). It appears in some sources as Adulf (Adulfus) and Aldulf, chiefly as a result of mistaken engravings of his coins and their mistaken attribution to Ealdwulf, king of East Anglia.

== Coins ==
Several gold tremisses have been discovered inscribed with Audulf's name and dated by numismatists to the period from the late 6th century to the early 7th century. They have been found at Escharen in North Brabant; at Wiuwert; and in England. The coins are now held by the collections in the Hague in the Netherlands and Brussels in Belgium; by the BnF Museum in Paris, France; and by the British Museum in London, England. They bear inscriptions in poor Latin reading avdvlfvs frisia ("Audulf Frisia") obverse and victvria avdvlfo ("Victory by Audulf") reverse. The known specimens are about 13 mm (0.51 in) wide and vary in weight from 1.34–1.52 g (0.047–0.054 oz).

Images of the Wiuwert tremissis,
now held by the BnF Museum
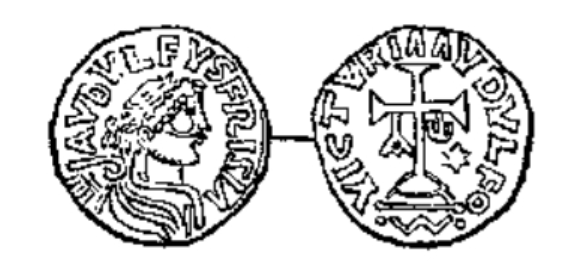
Duchalais (1854)

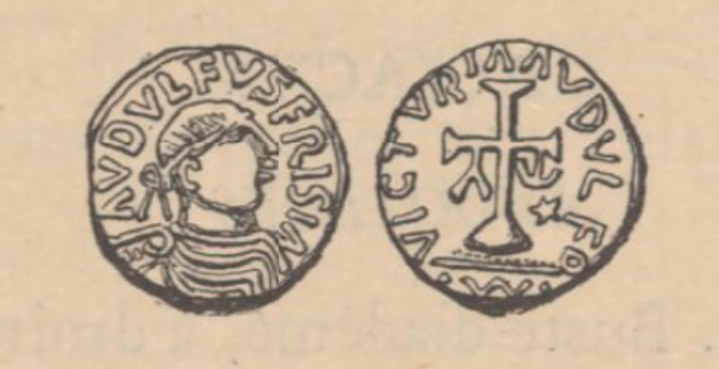
De Belfort (1892)

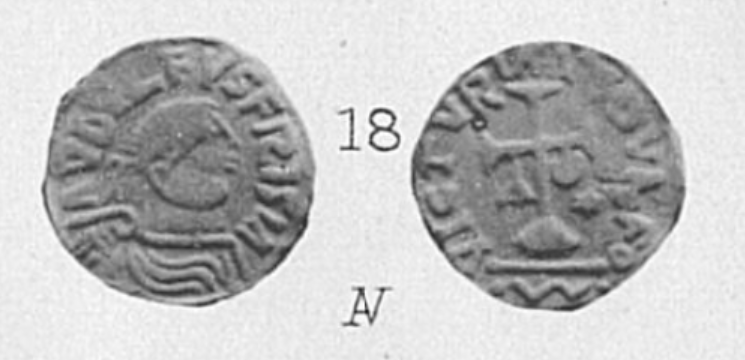
Prou (1892)

== Interpretation ==
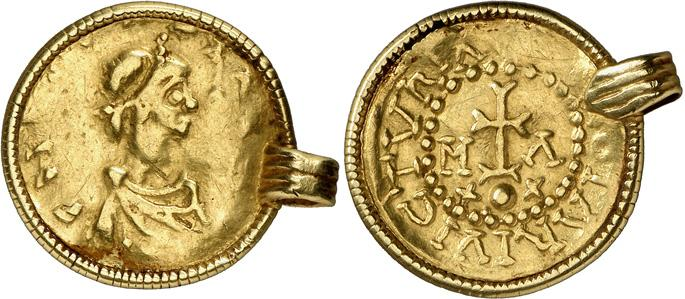
A solidus of Clothar II, closely copied by Audulf's tremissis

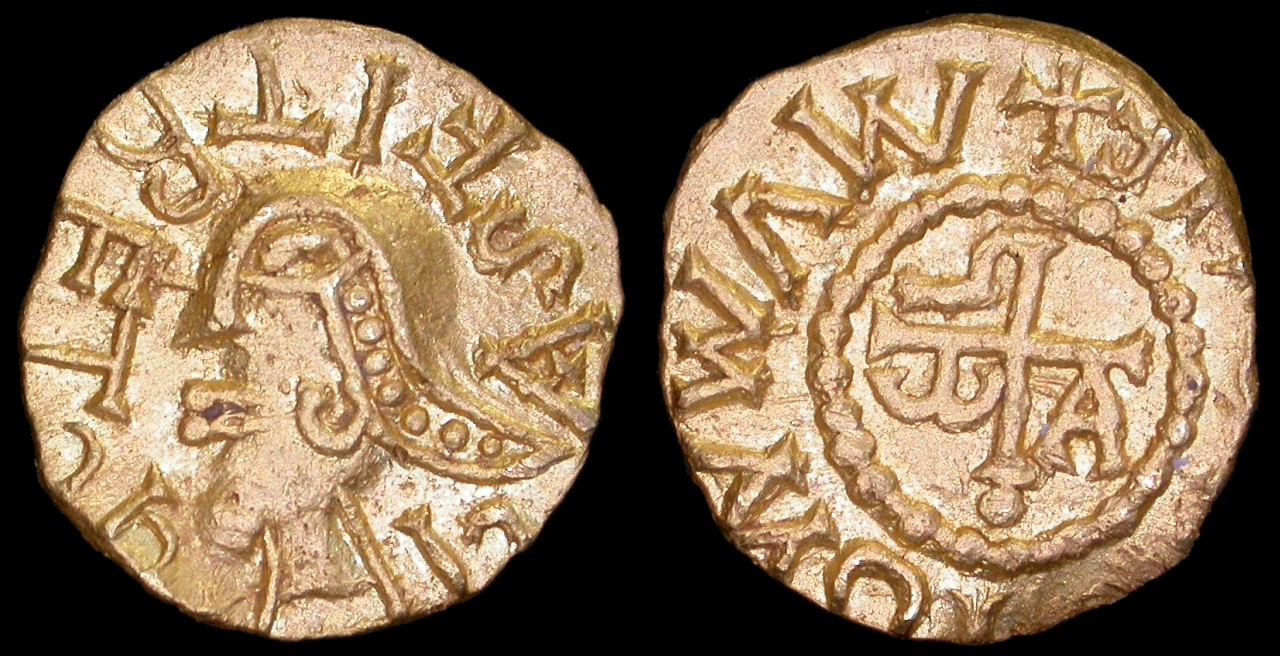
A Merovingian tremissis with a pendant Alpha and Omega reverse, rather than the M and A of Clothar II's issues

Duchalais lists the names typically featured on Merovingian-era coins as reigning kings, their moneyers and palace mayors, and high nobles and ecclesiastical officials. He dismissed the idea of Audulf being either a mayor or ecclesiastic out of hand on the basis of the reverse inscription touting a victory; but acknowledged that the inscription and design directly mimicked solidi and tremisses issued by Clothar II, that Clothar was specifically identified as a king (clotharivs rex) on his obverse, that Clothar's name was in the genitive (victvria clotharii) while moneyers were more often in the ablative as on Audulf's coins, and that—as the two words on the obverse are apparently unrelated to one another—it is quite possible the two words on the reverse were unconnected as well.

Given the lack of other identification for the diademed figure on the obverse of the coins, Duchalais leaned towards interpreting the coin as the issue of a petty king in Frisia in what is now the central Netherlands celebrating some obscure victory over his enemies or paganism. The Frisians of the era were ruled by numerous petty lords rather than Merovingian agents, and this view is generally upheld by modern Dutch scholars. Excavations in Westergo in northern Friesland have shown some level of united power or cooperation in the area during the relevant time period, and some scholars even think the victory mentioned on the coins may have been over the Franks themselves, who are recorded contesting control over the Rhine delta with the Frisians in the later 7th century.

Some numismatists, however, still consider the Audulf of the coins to have only been the moneyer of another ruler. Boeles went so far as to argue that the "Frisia" of the coin was unrelated to the Dutch area and possibly intended an area near Paris instead, although Lafaurie and Grierson considered this completely implausible.

Following Robert Cotton and John Speed, the English coin was long misattributed to Ealdwulf, the king of East Anglia from c. 664 to 713, a mistake further compounded by a series of errors that recorded it as a silver sceat penny and progressively garbled the coin's inscription and design. In 1772, Samuel Pegge correctly argued that all the coins then attributed to the early Anglo-Saxon kings were actually from continental Europe or from other rulers of a much later date. In doing so, however, he misattributed Audulf's coin to the 15th-century Adolf, duke of Guelders, after which it was ignored by subsequent numismatists until it was finally connected to Audulf's other coins and correctly restored to the Merovingian era in the 20th century.

English misrepresentations of the tremissis
now held by the British Museum
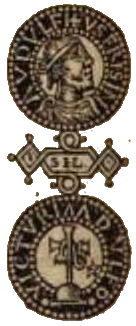
Speed (1611)

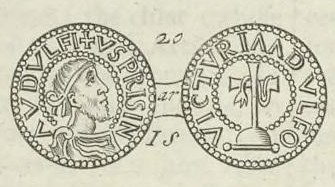
Walker (1695)

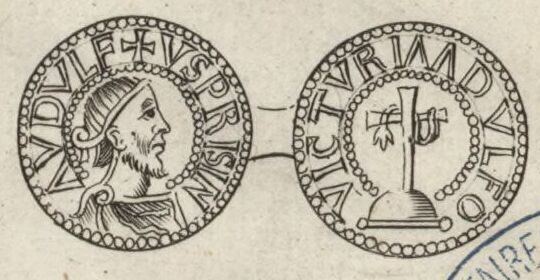
Moll (1724)

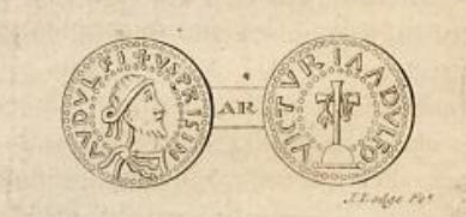
Clarke (1767)
