= Battle of the Boarn =

734 battle

Coordinates: 53.0768°N 5.7938°E

- Part of the Frisian–Frankish wars
Date	734
Location	The Boarn, Netherlands
Result	Frankish victory

Belligerents
Frankish Empire	Frisian kingdom

Commanders and leaders
Charles Martel	King Poppo †

The Battle of the Boarn (West Frisian: Slach oan de Boarn; Dutch: Slag aan de Boorne) or Battle by Jirnsum was an 8th century battle between the Franks and the Frisians near the mouth of the river Boarn in what is now Jirnsum in the Dutch province of Friesland.

== Battle ==
In 734 a Frankish army commanded by Majordomo Charles Martel invaded Friesland in a campaign that was part of a series of ongoing wars and skirmishes between the Franks and the Frisians. Marching along the river Boarn the Frankish army reached the mouth of the river where it used to flow into the Bordine estuary or Middelsee. This estuary has since silted up and was claimed for agriculture during the 10th to 14th century.

The Frisians commanded by King Poppo used boats to land their army in Jirnsum and surprise the Franks. However, the Frisian army was beaten and Poppo killed. The Franks gained control of the Frisian lands west of the Lauwers estuary and the Frisians became vassals of the Franks apart from the tribes living in East Frisia in present-day Germany.

== Bibliography ==
- Fredegarius, Liber Historiae Francorum
