= Unno =

Unno was a duke from the medieval Frisian shire of Rüstringen.

In the Frankish annals, Unno is described as a Frisian duke. He belonged to the Frisian elite who were willing to cooperate with the Franks after annexation of East Frisia in 772. In exchange for retaining their old privileges they had to become Christian and leave their pagan beliefs.

Following the defeat of the revolt of 782–785, the Frisians suffered harsh punishments and forced recruitment for the Frankish Empire's campaign against the Avars in the east. This led Unno, together with Eilrad, to lead another revolt against the Frankish empire of Charlemagne. This revolt resulted in the Frisians temporarily falling back to their old pagan beliefs. Christian missionaries such as Liudger were forced to flee and had to find a safe haven in the south of the Frankish empire. Unlike the earlier rebellion this one was to the area east of the Lauwers. It was beaten down in the same year.

== Sources ==
- Herre Halbertsma, Het rijk van de Friese koningen, opkomst en ondergang, Utrecht, 2000, pag. 310.
