= Thiadsvind =

Thiadsvind also known as Theudesinda or Theodelinda (born 677) was a Frisian princess, the daughter of Redbad, King of the Frisians. In 711 she was married to Grimoald the Younger the eldest son of Pepin of Herstal. The marriage was officiated by archbishop or bishop of the Frisians Willibrord. Her husband had 2 illegitimate sons: Theudoald and Arnold.

== Sources ==
- Liber Histoariae Francorum,
- Annales Mettenses.
