= Rüstringen =

Medieval Frisian gau

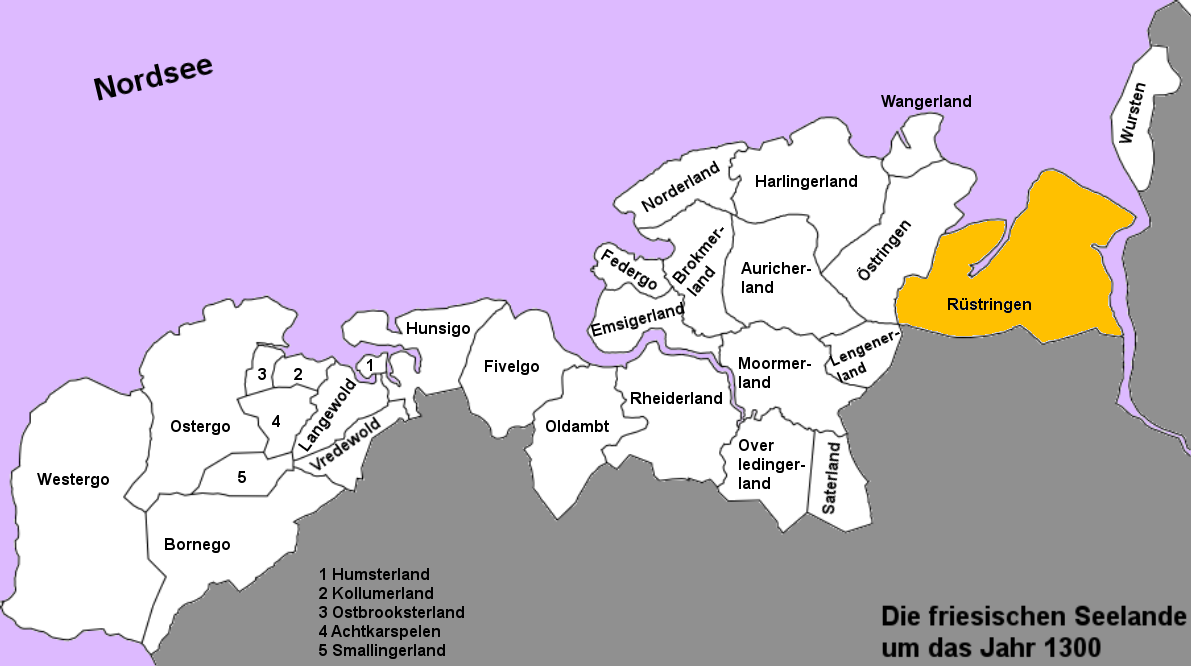
Location of Rüstringen

Rüstringen (German pronunciation: [ˈʁʏstrɪŋən]) or Rustringen was an old Frisian gau, which lies between the modern district Friesland and the Weser river in modern Lower Saxony. Nowadays, only a small part of the original territory remains, namely the Butjadingen peninsula. The largest part of historical Rüstringen has been lost to the sea in the Middle Ages due to various storm surges and now forms the Jadebusen bay.
