= Vlie =

Waterway between the Dutch islands of Vlieland and Terschelling

Coordinates: 53°18′N 5°11′E

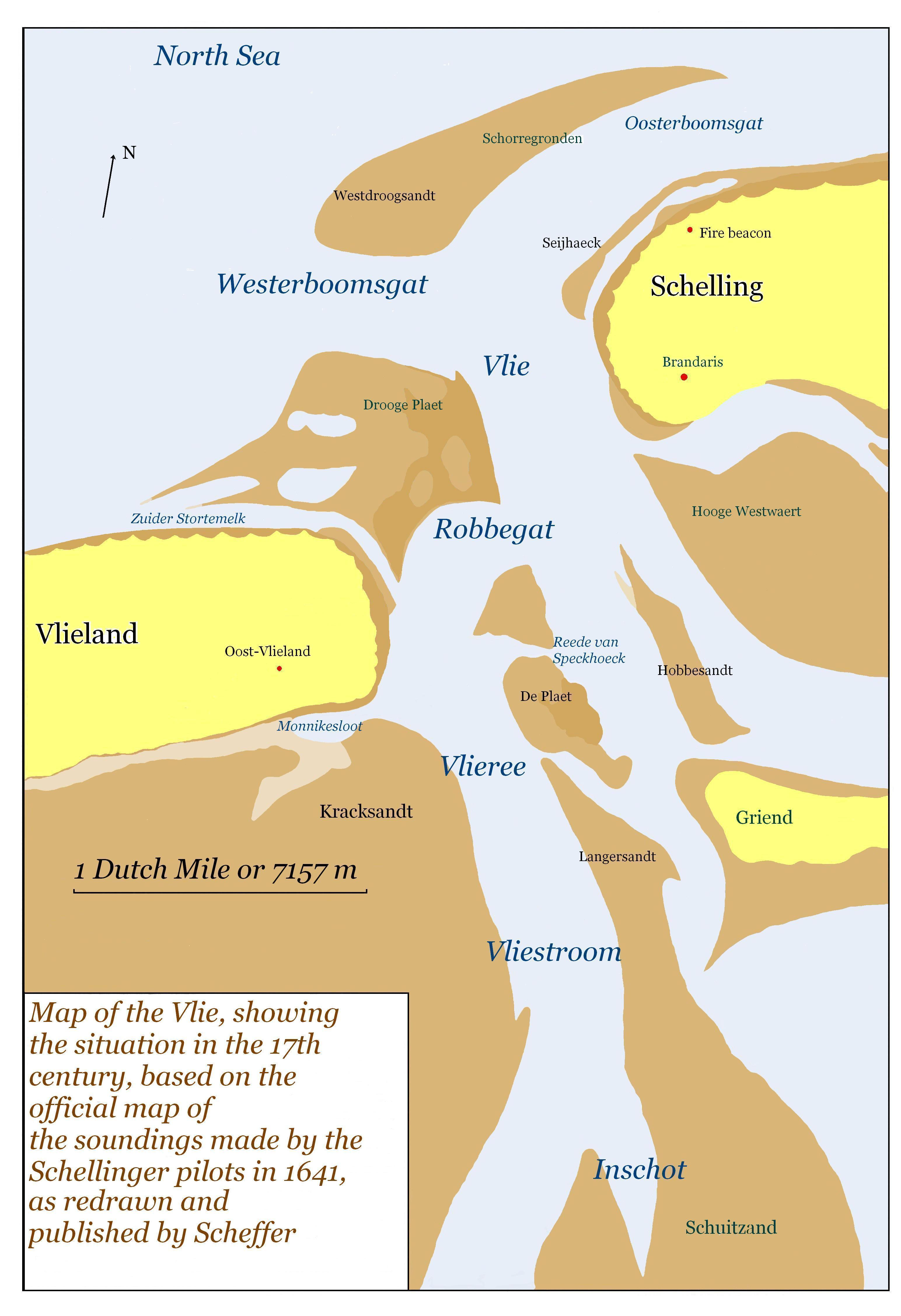
The Vlie, c. 1641

The Vlie or Vliestroom (West Frisian: Fly) is the seaway between the Dutch islands of Vlieland, to its southwest, and Terschelling, to its northeast. The Vlie was the estuary of the river IJssel in medieval times. Today it's still possible to reach the port of Harlingen by way of the Vlie.

The former Zuiderzee (called Lake Flevo) drained into the North See through the Vlie.

It is often supposed that the old Roman name for the lake that later would become the Zuiderzee: Lacus Flevo, is etymologically related to the name "Vlie" and that perhaps Vlie was once the name of the entire lake and the big river that flowed out of it. In the 13th century large floods widened the estuary and destroyed much of the peat land behind, creating a continuous area of sand and mudflats connecting the sea to the enlarged inland lake and obscuring the flow of the river. When the Afsluitdijk was created, the old streambed from the river to the sea was obstructed. The construction of the Afsluitdijk caused a 19% increase of current velocity in Vliestroom.

In 1666 the English Admiral Robert Holmes burnt a Dutch merchant fleet of 130 ships (Holmes's Bonfire), that had taken refuge in the Vlie, mistakenly supposing the English could never find their way through the treacherous shoals along its coastline.

In the Lex Frisonum the Vlie (Fli, or Flehi) is accepted as the boundary between the territory of the East and West Frisians.
