= Aldgisl =

Ruler of Frisia (fl. c. 678)

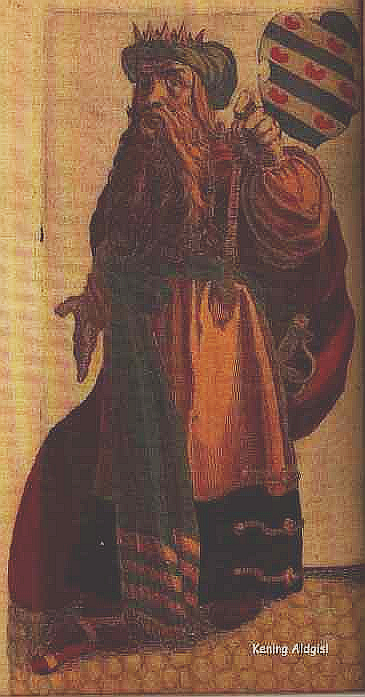
"King Aldgisl" as depicted in a Dutch chronicle from 1662

Aldegisel (also spelled Aldegisl, Aldgillis, Aldgisl, Aldgils or Eadgils, fl. c. 678) was the ruler of Frisia (as king or duke) in the late seventh century contemporarily with Dagobert II and a very obscure figure. All that is known of him is in relation to the famous saint that he harboured and protected, Wilfrid, but he is the first historically verifiable ruler of the Frisians.

What the exact title of the Frisian rulers was depends on the source. Frankish sources tend to call them dukes; other sources often call them kings.

Wilfrid, deposed from his Archdiocese of York, exiled from Northumbria and on his way to Rome to seek papal support, landed in Frisia in 678. and was warmly received by Aldegisel, who entertained him for several months over the winter, probably at Utrecht. According to Stephen of Ripon, Wilfrid's biographer, Aldegisel encouraged Wilfrid in his effective evangelism and "[the Frisians] accepted his [Wilfrid's] teaching and with a few exceptions all the chiefs were baptised by him in the name of the Lord, as well as many thousands of common people." It is possible that Aldegisel was one of the early converts. However, it has been doubted whether Wilfrid was actually successful in Frisia, since there is no other evidence of the success of Christianity there before the work of Willibrord.

While Wilfrid was at Aldegisel's court, the Frankish mayor of the palace, Ebroin, offered a bushel of gold coins in return for Wilfrid, alive or dead. Aldegisel himself is said to have torn up and burned the letter from the Frankish mayor in front of the ambassadors and his household. It has been surmised by some that Aldegisel's kindness to Wilfrid was a mode of defiance of Frankish domination. His successor and possibly son was Radbod, who preferred paganism and was an enemy of Charles Martel.
