= Dorestad =

Medieval emporium in the province of Utrecht, Netherlands

Coordinates: 51.9797°N 5.3479°E

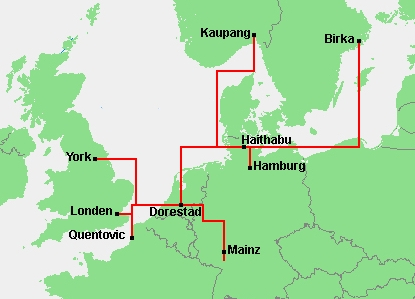
Dorestad in the network of main Northern European trade routes in the Early Middle Ages (c. 800)

Dorestad (Dorestat, Duristat) was an early medieval emporium, located in the present-day province of Utrecht in the Netherlands, close to the modern-day town of Wijk bij Duurstede. It flourished during the 8th to early 9th centuries, as an important port on the northeastern shipping routes due to its proximity to the fork in the Rhine, with access to Germany via the Nederrijn (the northernmost branch of the Rhine), to the southern Netherlands, northern France, and England (via the Lek), and to the northern Netherlands, northern Germany, and Scandinavia (via the Kromme Rijn).

== History ==
The township was established at the base of the former Roman fortress of Levefanum in the 7th century.

The Frankish Carolingian Empire and the Frisians fought for control of the territory, until the Franks gained control of the Frisian Coast in 719.

Dorestad flourished between the 7th century and the mid-9th century. The settlement was well known for minting coins under the control of several Frankish rulers. In the 7th century, it was clear that Dorestad had the potential to become a major port. It was the meeting point for traders at the time. As a result, the Franks and the Frisians fought over control of the township. The Franks won out at the end of the 7th century and closely monitored the growth of Dorestad, which led to Dorestad's economic expansion via international trade and the establishment of a mint in the Upper town. It is assumed that there was a toll as well as harbour fees, collected by the king's representatives at Dorestad. Over time, many coins have been discovered in the Dorestad area, supporting the idea of rapid growth and control of the harbour as well as the presence of a mint. Many of the coins that have been discovered bear resemblance to other Frankish coins of the period. The numismatic evidence supports the victory of the Franks over the Frisians.

It seems that the expansion of Dorestad, Lower Town in particular, lasted until the early 9th century, when the strength of the international trade of luxury items was weakened by the rise of regional trade. The shift in the character of trade occurred as more and more trading towns popped up in the region. The Franks seemed to be networking with Byzantium and the Muslim world. As the trade increased across the board, the Franks required more trading settlements to support the economy. As a result, the Franks slowly lost interest in the town and granted the Church of Utrecht responsibility over a sizeable portion of Dorestad. By expanding the power of the Church, the local élite was weakened providing substantial security for the Franks.

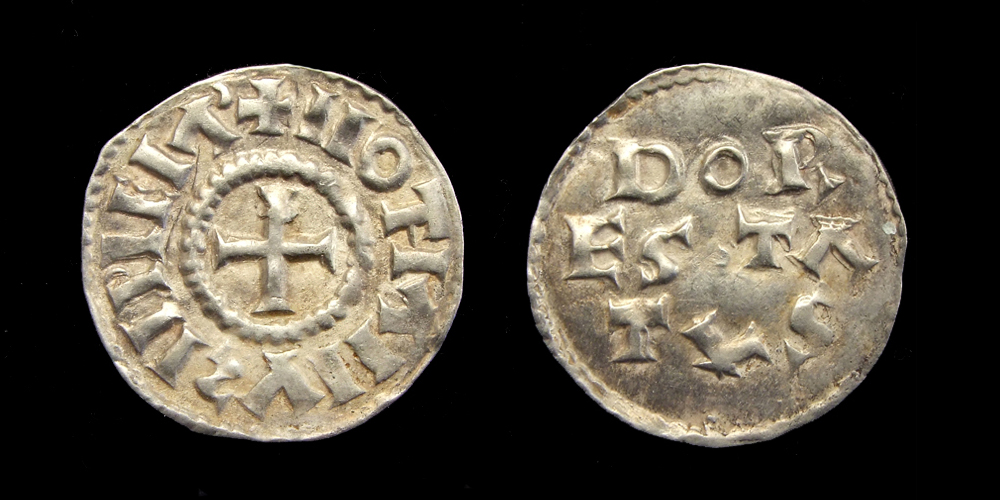
Denier of Lothair I, struck in Dorestad (DORESTATVS) c. 851–855.

It is generally believed that the township reached its peak around the 820s and 830s and declined considerably thereafter. It is thought that the decline occurred because of Viking raids as well as a decline in the economy.

By the 830s, under the control of Louis the Pious, the expansion of the harbour had halted altogether, but coins continued to be minted for some time. A division occurred in the Frankish Empire, and Louis the Pious was removed from the throne by his son. However, Lothair I was unable to protect Dorestad and the other Frankish territories from economic turmoil. As a result, Louis the Pious quickly took back Dorestad and exiled his son to Italy. At this time, two things occurred in Dorestad that led to its eventual downfall. The first was that the Franks lost even more interest in Dorestad and as a result, even more control was transferred to the Church. The second was that Lothair I was stirring up trouble for the Franks by encouraging Viking raids on the Frisian coast when he was exiled.

Between 834 and 839, there were extensive raids. Although Dorestad was raided only once, in 834, it seems that the town never fully recovered afterwards. To protect the Frisian coastline, Frankish kings enlisted the help of the Danes and appointed Haraldr Junior and his brother, Hroerekr, to protect the emporium. The Franks allowed Hroerekr to take control of the land as long as he protected the coast from Viking invasions. The coast was battered by Viking attacks, but it seems that Dorestad was left relatively unscathed. The Danish rulers held court on the coast for quite some time despite being not well liked by the people that they ruled.

By the 9th century, it seems that the need for international trade was waning as regional trade gained importance. Under Danish control, Dorestad became less significant. Trading had slowed and now was almost nonexistent. The mint was shut down when Hroerekr took control of the lands. As the settlement no longer held much economic or cultural significance. From around 840, the threat of the Vikings receded, as a truce was reached. The Franks no longer needed the help of the Danes and began to look for ways to dispose of them. That created conflict between the Franks and the Danes as Hroerekr established a gang of men to attack the coast.

In 846, Dorestad and two other settlements were plundered once again. While Frankish defence was organized, that did not stop the Danes from capturing Dorestad and a large portion of the Frisian Coast in 850.

According to Forte, Oram, and Pedersen, Dorestad, "...despite the slaughter and sack of the 830s seems quickly to have recovered its prosperity after each episode, and its disappearance in the 860s was a consequence of a shift in the course of the river channel along which its trade flowed rather than a result of Viking raids."

The site remained uninhabited from the later 9th until the construction of a keep, the nucleus of Duurstede Castle, in around 1270, about 800 m south of the old settlement. The modern settlement of Wijk bij Duurstede grew up around the castle, gaining city rights in 1300.

== Location ==
Dorestad grew to be a lively trade city (emporium) because of its location at the crossing of two important river trade routes. Along one route, Dorestad was connected to the Dutch mudflats and Frisian area in the north of the Netherlands via the Kromme Rijn, the Utrechtse Vecht and the Almere Lake. It was a connection of the German Rhineland via the Rhine with Scandinavia and the Baltic Sea. The second trade route ran from the Lek to the west coast and formed the connection between the Rhineland and England. This route could also be used to reach the Scheldt river, through which Neustria could be reached.

== Vikings ==
Because of its wealth and success as a trade centre, Dorestad got the attention of Vikings in the 9th century. This resulted in large groups of Vikings attacking and looting the city. The first attack took place in 834 and the last attack in 863.

The Danish King Sigfred felt threatened by the advancement of the Franks under the leadership of Charlemagne. Charlemagne's attempt to subject the Saxons east of the Elbe by annexing Nordalbingia led to a feud between the factions of Halfdan and Godfred, two supposed sons of Sigfred. The throne of Denmark was briefly under control of the son of Halfdan, Harald Klak, but he was driven away by the sons of Godfred.

The eldest son of Louis the Pious, Lothair, made use of the services provided by the Danish clan of the former King Harald Klak, who fled to Francia in 814. Harald was a vassal of King Louis with a place in Saxony. In the year 819 Harald became one of multiple kings in Denmark by the hand of Louis' negotiations with the Danes. In 826 Harald and his clan were baptised in Mainz, after which he received the East-Frisian county Rüstringen, of which the Gaus Östringen, Wangerland, Harlingerland and a part of Norderland may have consisted. Harald was driven from Denmark and spent his last 25 years of his life in the county.

When Lothair got in a feud with his father Louis over his reassignment of the Empire in 829, he gave orders to Harald the Younger, the nephew of Harald Klak, to make Frisia an unviable asset to King Louis by means of making crucial trade routes unsafe to travel and burning Dorestad to the ground. This would stagnate the transport of goods to the main areas of Francia, therefore forcing Louis to admit to the demands of Lothair. This resulted in Dorestad undergoing many attacks and lootings until Louis and Lothair came to terms in Worms in 839. Frisia got divided between Lothair and his half-brother Charles the Bald, where the river Meuse became the border. Lothair gave Dorestad to Harald the Younger and his brother Rorik. With the Treaty of Verdun in 843 the feud between the brothers ended and the Empire got divided once again, and Lothair got to rule over all of Frisia north of the Schelde, which became part of Middle Francia.

After the death of Louis the Pious in 840 a new feud developed between his three sons, but over in Frisia, Lothair had a strong position because of the Danish Warlords that were situated in Rüstringen, Dorestad and Walcheren. The devastating effects of the civil wars were much worse than that of the 'modest' Viking attacks. The Frisians and Danes got along well, and went as far as to exchange goods. Frisia stayed related to the Heathen Baltic Sea culture, and felt threatened and repressed by the centralized way of leadership and the Christian beliefs. The Frisians did not defend Walcheren when the Danes attacked in 837. The Frisian count Gerulf I of Frisia in Westergo was accused of neglect, but regained his possessions in 839.

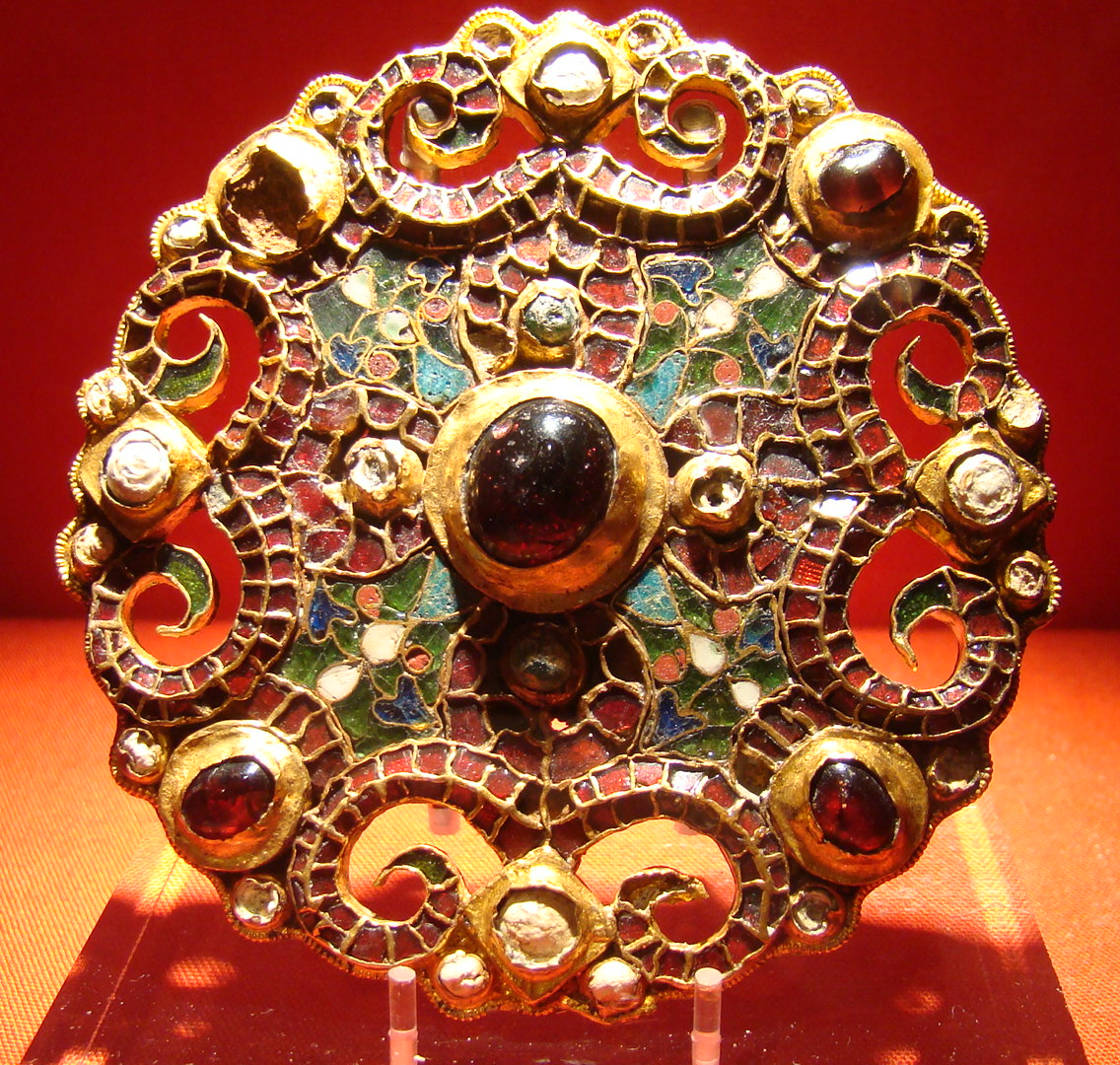
The Dorestad Fibula (c. 775–800) was found in a well. It is currently in the Rijksmuseum van Oudheden in Leiden.

One of the most famous archaeological finds in the Netherlands is the Dorestad Fibula (see image). It was found in an old well in Dorestad in 1969. The valuable piece of jewellery may have been placed in the well to protect it from danger, for example the attacks of the Vikings on Dorestad.

== Excavation ==
To find out more about the settlement and its prominence in the early Middle Ages the site was excavated. Some excavations took place in the middle of the nineteenth century and the finds from them are now in the National Museum of Antiquities and the British Museum. The most important findings were discovered during an excavation that took place between 1967 and 1977. About 30 hectare were exposed during the excavation and much was learned about the physical parameters of the settlement. It was discovered Dorestad was situated one mile north of Wijk bij Duurstede and was approximately 3 square kilometres in size. This is considered a large settlement for the time period.

It is believed that the settlement was separated into three districts: a harbour ("Lower town"), a trading centre located on the left bank ("Upper town"), and an agricultural area located further inland. Upper and lower town were connected by a single road which acted as the 'backbone' of the town. The remnants of this road can still be seen today.

Only the "lower town" was excavated by archaeologists as much of Dorestad was eroded away by the river bend. When the harbour was excavated the remains of wooden causeways which would have allowed for easy unloading of goods were discovered. These findings correlate to the development of trade on the Rhine. It is believed that wine from the vineyards South of Mainz was one of the most prominent products traded in Dorestad. Old wine barrels have been excavated in Dorestad. It is also thought that glassware and lava querns for grinding corn were also transported to Dorestad for trading. The existence of these imports allowed Dorestad's economy to grow substantially.

While the "upper town" was never excavated, the soil of the site has been examined and tested positive for phosphates that confirm its existence. Some Carolingian artefacts have been found over the years in the trading centre; however, the majority of items discovered date back to the Roman fortress that was established prior to the 7th Century. This may be because the residents of Dorestad used the tufa blocks from the Roman fortress as building material. It is thought that the royal administrators were situated in the Upper Town.

The Christian church was granted a piece of land in both the Upper and Lower Town. Next to the agricultural sector remains of a building were found as well as many graves. It is assumed that this area comprised the Lower church.

The conception of the Upper and Lower township is supported not only by archaeological evidence, but a poem was discovered by the English clergyman Alcuin, written at the end of the 8th century, referring to the town as Dorstada which is a pluralization of the name.

Hinc tua vela leva, fugiens Dorstada relinque:
Non tibi forte niger Hrotberct parat hospita tecta,
Nec amat ecce tuum carmen mercator avarus.

Hoist your sails, flee and leave behind the (towns of) Dorestad:
You do not have the fortune of a hospitable roof offered by Black Hrotberct,
Nor does the greedy merchant love your poem.

== See also ==
- Battle of Dorestad
- Quentovic
