= Timeline of French history =

This is a timeline of French history, comprising important legal changes and political events in France and its predecessor states. To read about the background to these events, see History of France. See also the list of Frankish kings, French monarchs, and presidents of France.

== 5th century ==
Year	Date	Event
418		Honorius gave land in Gallia Aquitania to his Visigoth federates in which to settle, forming the nucleus of the future Visigothic Kingdom under king Wallia and then his son and heir Theodoric I.
426		Clodio, the earliest recorded king lord of the Salian Franks, began his reign.
448		Clodio died. He was succeeded by Merovech.
451	20 June	Battle of Châlons: Romans, Visigoths under Theodoric I and their allies (including the Franks) definitively stop further Hunnic invasion in Gaul. Theodoric I died during the battle, he was succeeded by his son Thorismund who also had a decisive role during the battle.
453		Thorismund was murdered by his younger brother Theodoric II who succeeded him in the throne of the Visigothic Kingdom.
457		Merovech died. His son Childeric I succeeded him as king.
457		The Domain of Soissons, last Roman province of Gaul, was created with Aegidius as magister militum of the rump state.
462		Roman territory of Septimania was ceded to the Visigothic Kingdom.
463		Gothic war against Aegidius: Aegidius and Childeric I defeated the invading Visigoths in Orléans.
464		Aegidius died. His son Syagrius succeeded him as magister militum of the Domain of Soissons.
466		Theodoric II was murdered and succeeded by his younger brother Euric as king of the Visigoths, declaring total independence from Roman influence and extending during his reign the Visigothic kingdom to most of the Iberian Peninsula.
469		Revolt of Euric: Euric takes possession of parts of Spain and conquers the south of Gaul.
481		Childeric I died. His son Clovis I succeeded him.
485		Euric died and was succeeded by his son Alaric II as king of the Visigoths.
486		Franco-Roman War of 486: Battle of Soissons: A Frankish army under Clovis I defeated Syagrius and conquered the Domain of Soissons. Syagrius sought refuge in Alaric II's kingdom, but was later handed back to Clovis and beheaded.

== 6th century ==
Year	Date	Event
507		Franco-Gothic War (507–511): Clovis defeated a Visigoth army under Alaric II in the Battle of Vouillé, and conquered Gallia Aquitania, thus forming the basis of modern-day France.
511	27 November	Clovis died. His kingdom was divided among his four sons; the territory with its seat at Paris went to Childebert I, the kingdom of Soissons went to Chlothar I, the kingdom of Orléans went to Chlodomer, and the kingdom of Rheims (Austrasia) went to Theuderic I.
524	25 June	Battle of Vézeronce: The united armies of Clovis' sons inflicted a serious defeat on the Burgundian king Godomar. Chlodomer, the king of Orléans, was killed in battle.
524		Chlothar I, the king of Neustria, had two of Chlodomer's sons killed and forced the third into hiding thus inheriting his kingdom.
534		Theuderic I died, his son Theudebert I succeeded him as king of Austrasia.
547		Theudebert I died, his son Theudebald succeeded him as king of Austrasia.
555		Theudebald died, his realm passed to his great-uncle Chlothar I.
558	23 December	Childebert I died. His brother Chlothar I inherited his territory, thus becoming sole King of the Franks and reuniting Clovis' kingdom.
561	29 November	Chlothar I died. The kingdom was divided among his four sons; Paris went to Charibert I, Burgundy to Guntram, Austrasia to Sigebert I, Soissons to Chilperic I.
567	November	Charibert I, king of Paris, died. With no heir, his realm was partitioned among his brothers.
575		Sigebert I of Austrasia died, his son, Childebert II, inherited his kingdom.
584	September	Chilperic I of Soissons (Neustria) was assassinated. His infant son Chlothar II became king and his wife Fredegund became regent.
592	28 January	Guntram of Burgundy died, his realm was passed on to Childebert II who was his adoptive son.
592	8 December	Fredegund died so the 13-year-old Chlothar II started his reign as King of Neustria.
589	17 October	Charibert II, Franco-Lombard-Byzantine war over the Po Valley. The war was stopped by breaching dam in Cucca, transferred to the Lombards by the Byzantine emperor Maurice, which caused a severe flood, that blocked the franks' army advance into Italy.
595		Childebert II died, his kingdom was divided between his two sons. The kingdom of Austrasia went to Theudebert II, the kingdom of Burgundy to Theuderic II.

== 7th century ==
Year	Date	Event
612		Theudebert II, the king of Austrasia, was assassinated. His realm went to his brother Theuderic II, king of Burgundy.
613		Theuderic II died. His bastard son Sigebert II briefly inherited his kingdom.
613		Sigebert II, the king of Burgundy and Austrasia, was executed by Chlothar II, who inherited his kingdoms thus becoming sole king of the Franks.
623		Chlothar II gave Austrasia its independence under the kingship of his son, Dagobert I.
629		Chlothar II died. Under an agreement forged after his death, Dagobert I succeeded him as king of Neustria but ceded what would become Aquitaine to his brother, Charibert II.
632	8 April	Charibert II died, possibly in an assassination ordered by his brother Dagobert I. His infant son Chilperic succeeded him as king of Aquitaine.
632		Chilperic was also killed. Dagobert I reacquired Aquitaine and became sole king of the Franks.
639	19 January	Dagobert I died. Austrasia went to his son Sigebert III, and the Kingdom of Neustria and Burgundy to Clovis II. Both of these new kings are considered early rois fainéants.
655		Clovis II died. He was succeeded by his son Chlothar III (roi fainéant).
656	1 February	Sigebert III died. He was succeeded by Childebert the Adopted.
661		Childebert the Adopted died. Chlothar III annexed his kingdom, and became sole king of the Franks.
661		Chlothar III died. His kingdom was divided between his two younger brothers; Austrasia to Childeric II, and Neustria to Theuderic III (roi fainéant).
673		Childeric II annexed Theuderic III's kingdom, and became sole king of the Franks.
675		Childeric II died. Theuderic III inherited Neustria, Clovis III (roi fainéant) inherited Austrasia.
676		Clovis III died. Theuderic III inherited his kingdom, becoming sole king of the Franks.
691		Theuderic III died. He was succeeded by his son Clovis IV (roi fainéant).
695		Clovis IV died. He was succeeded by his brother Childebert III.

== 8th century ==
Year	Date	Event
711	23 April	Childebert died. He was succeeded by his son Dagobert III.
715		Dagobert died. He was succeeded by Chilperic II, the youngest son of Childeric II.
721	13 February	Chilperic died. He was succeeded by Theuderic IV, Dagobert III's son.
732	10 October	Battle of Tours: Frankish and Burgundian soldiers under the Mayor of the Palace Charles Martel inflicted a significant defeat on the invading armies of the Umayyad Caliphate.
737		Theuderic died. Charles Martel was prevented succession.
741	22 October	Charles Martel died and his realm was divided between his two sons, Pepin the Short and Carloman, acting as Mayors of the Palace.
743		Childeric III was finally proclaimed king of the Franks thanks to Pepin the Short's influence, after the throne was vacant for 7 years.
747	15 August	Carloman renounced his position as Mayor of the Palace and withdrew to monastic life, his realm was given to his brother, Pepin the Short.
751		Childeric III was dethroned as the last king of the Merovingian dynasty, Pepin the Short was later crowned king of the Franks, thus starting the rule of the Carolingian dynasty.
768	24 September	Pepin the Short died.
768	9 October	Charlemagne and Carloman I were proclaimed Kings of the Franks after their father's death. Each brother obtained half of their father's kingdom.
771	4 December	Carloman I died, Charlemagne annexed his kingdom.
774		Following successful conquests, Charlemagne became king of the Lombards.
795		The Spanish March was created by Charlemagne as a buffer zone between the Frankish kingdom and Al-Andalus.

== 9th century ==
Year	Date	Event
800	25 December	Charlemagne is crowned Imperator Augustus by Pope Leo III.
811		The treaty of Heiligen is signed between Charlemagne and the Danish king establishing the boundary between Denmark and the Frankish Empire.
812		Frankish conquests in Spain were recognized by Emir Al-Hakam I.
814	28 January	Charlemagne dies and his only legitimate son, Louis the Pious, inherits the Empire.
840	20 June	Louis the Pious dies, the Frankish Empire is claimed by his eldest son Lothair I, over his two brothers, Louis the German and Charles the Bald.
843		Treaty of Verdun: An alliance between Louis the German and Charles the Bald, and their victories over Lothair I, compelled the elder brother to negotiate the division of the Frankish Empire. It was divided in three parts; West Francia for Charles the Bald, Middle Francia for Lothair I and East Francia for Louis the German, hence laying the foundations of modern France and Germany.
875	29 December	Charles the Bald is crowned Holy Roman Emperor by Pope John VIII.
876	8 October	Battle of Andernach: After Louis the German's death, Charles the Bald is badly defeated at Andernach by Louis' successor, Carloman of Bavaria, in an attempt to conquer his late brother's kingdom.
877	6 October	Fleeing Northern Italy from Carloman's army, Charles the Bald falls ill and dies. His son Louis the Stammerer (Louis II) succeeds him as King of West Francia.
879	10 April	Louis the Stammerer dies of illness. His two sons Louis III and Carloman II succeed him as joint kings of West Francia.
880	March	Louis III and Carloman II sign a treaty in Amiens dividing the kingdom between each other. Louis III obtains Neustria, Carloman II receives Burgundy and Aquitaine.
882	5 August	Louis III dies, Carloman II becomes sole king of West Francia.
884	12 December	Carloman II dies, his cousin Charles the Fat (Louis the German's youngest son) already king of East Francia, succeeds in the rule of West Francia reviving until his death the entire Carolingian Empire.
888	13 January	Charles the Fat dies, with no legitimate or recognized heir, the Empire falls apart never to be reunited again.
888	February	Odo of France is crowned King of the Western Franks for his successes in fighting off the Normans. Ranulf II became King of Aquitaine.
898	1 January	Odo of France dies leaving no surviving heir. Charles the Simple, son of Louis the Stammerer, is declared king of West Francia, the Carolingian dynasty is thus again ruler of France.

== 10th century ==
Year	Date	Event
911		Charles signed the Treaty of Saint-Clair-sur-Epte with Rollo, the king of the Vikings, allowing their settlement in what would become the Duchy of Normandy.
922		Charles was overthrown by a noble revolt and replaced by Robert I, Odo's brother.
923	15 June	Battle of Soissons (923): Robert was killed. Charles was captured by Rudolph, the duke of Burgundy.
923		Rudolph was elected king of France by an assembly of nobles. He left the Duchy of Burgundy to his brother.
936	15 January	Rudolph died. He was succeeded by Louis IV, a son of Charles the Simple.
954	10 September	Louis IV died. He was succeeded by his son Lothair.
986	1 March	Lothair died. He was succeeded by his son Louis V.
987	21 May	Louis V died. With no heir, Hugh Capet was chosen as his successor for his noble blood and military successes, thus ending the Carolingian dynasty's reign, and starting the Capetian dynasty.
996	24 October	Hugh Capet died. He was succeeded by his son Robert II.

== 11th century ==
Year	Date	Event
1004		Robert annexed the Duchy of Burgundy.
1016	6 July	Battle of Pontlevoy
1022		Orléans heresy
1031	20 July	Robert died in a civil war against his sons. His second son, Henry I, succeeded him; his third, Robert I Capet, disputed the succession and led a new revolt.
1032		Henry purchased peace by reversing the annexation of the Duchy of Burgundy and giving it to his brother.
1047		Battle of Val-ès-Dunes
1054		Battle of Mortemer
1060	4 August	Henry died. The throne passed to his seven-year-old son, Philip I, with his wife Anne of Kiev acting as regent.
1066		Philip entered his majority.

== 12th century ==
Year	Date	Event
1108	29 July	Philip died. He was succeeded by his late son Louis VI, the Fat.
1131	25 October	Louis' son, the future Louis VII, the Young, was crowned the junior king and heir to the throne.
1137	22 July	Louis VII became duke of Aquitaine by a political marriage to the duchess Eleanor.
1137	1 August	Louis the Fat died. Louis VII became king.
1152	21 March	The marriage of Louis VII and Eleanor was annulled.
1180	18 September	Louis VII died. He was succeeded by his son Philip II.

== 13th century ==
Year	Date	Event
1214	27 July	Battle of Bouvines: The French army defeated a combined English–Flemish force, enabling the kingdom to consolidate its control over Anjou, Brittany, Maine, Normandy and the Touraine.
1223	14 July	Philip II died. He was succeeded by his son Louis VIII, the Lion.
1226	8 November	Louis died. He was succeeded by his son Louis IX.
1241	June	Louis IX announced that the County of Poitiers would go to his brother Alphonse – offending Isabella of Angoulême, whose son would have inherited the territory had the English won the Battle of Bouvines.
1242	20 May	Saintonge War: Henry III of England arrived with an army in support of Isabella's claim to Poitiers.
1270	25 August	Louis IX died. He was succeeded by his son Philip III.
1285	5 October	Philip III died. He was succeeded by his son Philip IV.
1297		Louis IX was canonized by Pope Boniface VIII, and was from then on better known as Saint Louis. He is the only French monarch to be declared a saint.

== 14th century ==
Year	Date	Event
1302	18 May	Bruges Matins: The exiled citizens of Bruges, in Flanders, returned to their hometown and killed every Frenchman.
1302	11 July	Battle of the Golden Spurs: Flemish insurrectionists soundly defeated a French occupation force.
1314	29 November	Philip IV died. He was succeeded by his eldest son Louis X, the Headstrong.
1316	5 June	Louis X died, possibly of poisoning. His wife was pregnant with their first child; his brother Philip V was appointed regent.
1316	15 November	Louis X's son was born John I, the Posthumous. He died 5 days later so Philip V was crowned king of France.
1322	3 January	Philip V died. With no heir, his younger brother Charles IV succeeded him.
1328	1 February	Charles IV died. He was succeeded by his cousin Philip VI.
1350	22 August	Philip VI died. He was succeeded by his son John II.
1356	19 September	Battle of Poitiers a major battle of the Hundred Years' War between England and France.
1357		The States-General passed Étienne Marcel's Great Ordinance in an attempt to impose limits on the monarchy, in particular in fiscal and monetary matters.
1364	8 April	John II died. He was succeeded by his son Charles V.
1380	16 September	Charles V died. He was succeeded by his son Charles VI.

== 15th century ==
Year	Date	Event
1412	756	Birth of Jeanne d'Arc (The Maid of Orleans)
1415	13 August	Hundred Years' War (1415–1429): An English army under King Henry V landed in the north of France.
1415	25 October	Battle of Agincourt: A major loss to the French in the Hundred Years' War (1415–1429)
1418	30 May	The army of John the Fearless, duke of Burgundy, captured Paris. The dauphin, the future Charles VII, fled.
1419	20 September	John the Fearless was assassinated by companions of the dauphin. He was succeeded by his son Philip the Good, who would ally himself with the English against the French crown.
1420	21 May	The Burgundians compelled Charles VI to sign the Treaty of Troyes, under which the throne was to pass to Henry V.
1422	31 August	Henry V died. He was succeeded as King of England by his infant son Henry VI.
1422	21 October	Charles VI died. He was succeeded by his son Charles VII as king of France, a title disputed for Henry VI of England.
1438	7 July	Charles VII issues the Pragmatic Sanction of Bourges, requiring Church councils to be held every 10 years, and confirming the right of the Gallican Church to appoint ecclesiastical officials.
1453	17 July	Battle of Castillon: In what is considered the last battle of the Hundred Years' War, the French inflict a decisive victory on the English army, eventually gaining back all English-held territories of France.
1461	22 July	Charles VII died. He was succeeded by his son Louis XI.
1483	30 August	Louis XI died. He was succeeded by his son Charles VIII.
1494		Charles VIII begins the first of the Italian Wars by invading Italy, but is eventually repulsed by the League of Venice.
1498	7 April	Charles VIII died. With no heir, he was succeeded by his father's second cousin, the Duke of Orléans, Louis XII.
1499		Louis XII begins the Italian War of 1499–1504 in order to press his claims to the Duchy of Milan and the Kingdom of Naples.

== 16th century ==
Year	Date	Event
1508	10 December	War of the League of Cambrai: Representatives of the Papacy, France, and the Holy Roman Empire and Ferdinand I of Spain established the League of Cambrai, whose purpose was to defeat Venice and partition its territory.
1514	18 May	Claude, the duchess of Brittany, was married to Francis of Angoulême, the heir to the French throne.
1515	1 January	Louis XII died. Francis of Angoulême succeeded him as Francis I.
1524	20 July	Claude died. Her eldest son Francis, Dauphin of France, became Duke of Brittany.
1525	24 February	Battle of Pavia. Francis is defeated by Imperial forces under Charles V and captured.
1532		Francis I issued an edict incorporating Brittany into the kingdom of France.
1547	31 March	Francis I died. He was succeeded by his son Henry II.
1559	3 April	Henry II ends the Italian Wars by signing the Peace of Cateau-Cambrésis and renouncing all his Italian claims.
	10 July	Henry II died. He was succeeded by his son Francis II.
1560	5 December	Francis II died. With no heir, he was succeeded by his brother Charles IX.
1562	1 March	Massacre of Vassy begins the French Wars of Religion.
1572	23 August	St. Bartholomew's Day massacre of French Protestants.
1574	30 May	Charles IX died. With no heir, he was succeeded by his brother Henry III.
1589	2 August	Henry III died with no heir, thus ending the reign of the Valois branch of the Capetian dynasty. He was succeeded by Henry IV, the first monarch of the House of Bourbon.
1598	13 April	Henry IV issued the Edict of Nantes to end the French civil war of religion.

== 17th century ==
Year	Date	Event
1610	14 May	King Henry IV died, by assassination Francois Ravaillac. He was succeeded by his eldest son Louis XIII, with de' Medici ruling as regent.
1617		Sixteen-year-old Louis exiled his mother and took control of the government.
1624	August	Louis took Cardinal Richelieu as his chief minister.
1643	14 May	Louis died. His five-year-old son Louis XIV succeeded him. Cardinal Mazarin became regent.
1648	August	Fronde: Cardinal Mazarin ordered the arrest of the leaders of the parlement of Paris, which provoked widespread rioting.
1648	24 October	Thirty Years' War: The Peace of Westphalia ended the war with France obtaining the better bargain, and annexing eastern territories.
1659	November	Franco-Spanish War: Victorious France signs the Treaty of the Pyrenees with Spain and annexes northern Catalonia and French Flanders. The war confirms France as the dominant continental power and Bourbon strength over the Habsburgs.
1668	2 May	Treaty of Aix-la-Chapelle: end of the War of Devolution. France obtains Lille and other territories of Flanders from Spain.
1678		Treaties of Nijmegen: A series of treaties ending the Franco-Dutch War. France obtains the Franche-Comté and some cities in Flanders and Hainaut (from Spain).
1684	15 August	Truce of Ratisbon: End of the War of the Reunions. France obtains further territories in the north-west from Spain.
1697	20 September and 30 October	Treaty of Ryswick: End of the Nine Years' War between France and the Grand Alliance. Territorial changes were made in Europe and the colonial empires of the countries involved.

== 18th century ==
Year	Date	Event	Image
1701	9 July	Battle of Carpi: In what was the first battle of the War of the Spanish Succession, Austrian invaders encountered the French army at Carpi, and defeated them.	
1713	11 April	War of the Spanish Succession: France and England signed the Treaty of Utrecht, under which Philip V of Spain renounced for himself and his descendants any right to the French throne. Similarly, possible heirs to the French crown renounced all rights to the rulership of Spain.	
1713	7 March	War of the Spanish Succession: The Treaty of Rastatt ended hostilities between France and Austria.	
1715	1 September	Louis XIV died of gangrene. His five-year-old great-grandson Louis XV succeeded him, with Louis XIV's nephew Philippe II, Duke of Orléans, acting as regent.	
1720	17 February	Treaty of The Hague: France and its allies signed a treaty with Spain, thus ending the War of the Quadruple Alliance.	
1723	15 February	Louis XV became the new King of France.	
1738	18 November	Treaty of Vienna: The signing of the treaty ended the War of the Polish Succession. France gained the Duchy of Lorraine and Bar.	
1744	5–10 October	Louis XV visits Strasbourg. It is the first time since 1681 that a monarch goes to Alsace. Sumptuous festivals are organized throughout the city, the wine flows in the fountains of the squares, fireworks are fired, and a huge screen 12 meters high and 30 wide is set up in front of the Rohan Palace to partially hide the little-appreciated Gothic houses. This visit will leave the city ecstatic and indebted for many years.	
1745	23 February	The Dauphin Louis of France marries Infanta Maria Teresa Rafaela of Spain at the Chapel of Versailles.	
1745	25–26 February	Yew Tree Ball: Masked ball given by the Louis XV in the Grand Gallery of the Chateau of Versailles, on the occasion of the marriage of Louis, Dauphin of France with Maria Teresa, Infanta of Spain. Fifteen thousand people attended including Jeanne Antoinette Poisson who met with the King for a second time.	
1745	11 May	War of the Austrian Succession: French forces defeat an Anglo-Dutch-Hanoverian army at the Battle of Fontenoy; Louis XV, and his son, the Dauphin, were present at the battle.	
1745	6 December	Jean-Baptiste de Machault d'Arnouville becomes Controller-General of Finances at the age of forty-four.	
1746	5 August	Christophe de Beaumont becomes Archbishop of Paris at the age of forty-three.	
1748	18 October	Treaty of Aix-la-Chapelle: The signing of the treaty, dictated by France and Britain, ended the War of the Austrian Succession. The French population was dissatisfied with the terms, considering the French conquests during the war.	
1763	10 February	Seven Years' War: France and some allied and enemy nations sign the Treaty of Paris ending the Seven Years' War, resulting in a major blow on French colonial possessions.	
1768	15 May	Treaty of Versailles: In order to pay its debts and being no longer able to suppress struggle for independence, the Republic of Genoa ceded Corsica to France. Corsica remained French ever since.	
1770	16 May	The Dauphin Louis Auguste of France marries Archduchess Maria Antonia of Austria at the Chapel of Versailles.	
1774	10 May	Louis XV died. He was succeeded by his grandson Louis XVI.	
1778	February	France recognizes the American colonies as independent from the United Kingdom, making its involvement in the American War of Independence official. France will wage war with the United Kingdom in the Americas and other parts of the world assuring victory with the Peace of Paris.	
1786	21–23 June	Louis XVI visits Cherbourg to see the construction site of the dam and the arsenal.	
1789	14 July	The French Revolution began with the storming of the Bastille.	
1792	21 September	The constitutional monarchy in France is abolished, and the French First Republic was declared.	
1793	21 January	Former King of France Louis XVI was executed by guillotine. The National Convention had taken power a few months earlier.	
1793	7 June	Revolutionary Paris sections took over the Convention, calling for administrative and political purges, starting 1-year and 2 months of what is known as the Reign of Terror.	
1793	16 October	Former Queen of France Marie Antoinette was executed by guillotine.	
1795	2 November	The Directory seized power over the Convention.	
1797	17 October	War of the First Coalition – The Treaty of Campo Formio is signed between France and Austria following decisive French military victories. The treaty marks the collapse of the First Coalition, composed of European powers which tried to contain Revolutionary France.	
1798	7 July	The United States Congress rescinded treaties with France, a moment considered as the semi-official beginning of the Quasi-War.	
1799	9 November	Coup of 18 Brumaire: General Napoleon Bonaparte overthrew the French Directory, replacing it with the French Consulate.	

== 19th century ==
Year	Date	Event	Image
1801	9 February	War of the Second Coalition: The Treaty of Lunéville was signed after the victory of the French Republic against the Second Coalition states (led by the Austrian and Russian Empires), marking the end of the war with only Britain left fighting France.	
1801	15 July	The Concordat of 1801 was signed between Napoleon and Pope Pius VII, solidifying the Roman Catholic Church as the majority church of France, returning most of its civil status, and restoring much power to the papacy.	
1802	3 February	Saint-Domingue expedition: French Army General Charles Leclerc and the first 5,000 of 20,000 troops arrive at Cap-François (now Cap-Haïtien) to suppress Toussaint L'Ouverture and the rebellion of the black population in Haiti.	
1802	25 March	War of the Second Coalition: The Treaty of Amiens established a peace between France and the United Kingdom.	
1803	2 May	Louisiana Purchase: France sold Louisiana to the United States of America, renouncing its last territorial possessions on continental North America.	
1803	18 November	Battle of Vertières: The viscount of Rochambeau was defeated and forced to surrender to the revolutionary army of Jean-Jacques Dessalines.	
1804	1 January	Haitian Revolution: Dessalines declared the independence of Haiti.	
1804	18 May	Napoleon was declared Emperor by the Senate, marking the beginning of the First French Empire and the end of the French Consulate.	
1804	2 December	Napoleon crowned himself Emperor in Notre-Dame de Paris. Napoleon had Pope Pius VII in attendance to indicate approval of the Church.	
1805	2 December	War of the Third Coalition: The French Empire is victorious at the decisive Battle of Austerlitz which marks the end of the Third Coalition (Austria, Russia, United Kingdom, Sweden and others) against France and its client states.	
1806	12 July	Napoleon dissolved the Holy Roman Empire, and created the Confederation of the Rhine, a union of French client states composed of 16 states in present-day Germany.	
1807	14 June	War of the Fourth Coalition: The French Empire is victorious at the decisive Battle of Friedland which marks the end of the Fourth Coalition (mainly Prussia, Russia, Saxony, Sweden, and the United Kingdom) against France and its client states.	
1808	2 May	Beginning of the Peninsular War which will last until Napoleon's defeat against the Sixth Coalition in 1814.	
1809	5 July	War of the Fifth Coalition: The French Empire is victorious at the decisive Battle of Wagram which marks the end of the Fifth Coalition (mainly the Austrian Empire and the United Kingdom) against France and its client states. (to 6 July)	
1812	14 September	War of the Sixth Coalition: The Fire of Moscow marks the beginning of French retreat after the French invasion of Russia. The First French Empire reached the height of its power and declined henceforth with the disastrous Battle of Berezina. The Sixth Coalition will go on to win the war and Napoleon will be exiled in 1814 to Elba.	
1813	26–27 August	Battle of Dresden, took place around Dresden, Germany, resulting in a French victory under Napoleon against forces of the Sixth Coalition of Austrians, Russians and Prussians under Field Marshal Schwartzenberg. However, Napoleon's victory was not as complete as it could have been. Substantial pursuit was not undertaken after the battle, and the flanking corps was surrounded and forced to surrender a few days later at the Battle of Kulm.	
1813	16–19 October	Battle of Leipzig, 600,000 soldiers are involved in the largest battle in Europe prior to World War I. Coalition routs the French.	
1814	4 April	Forced abdication of Napoleon and subsequent exile to Elba.	
1814	24 April	First Restoration: The House of Bourbon was briefly restored with Louis XVIII as King of France in an intermediate period of the Napoleonic Wars.	
1815	21 January	The transfer of the coffins of King Louis XVI and his wife, Marie Antoinette, to the church St. Denis in Paris.	
1815	26 February	Hundred Days: Napoleon escapes from Elba.	
1815	7 March	Hundred Days: Napoleon greeted by the 5th Regiment at Grenoble after his escape from Elba.	
1815	18 June	Hundred Days: Battle of Waterloo: Napoleon is defeated by Seventh Coalition armies, definitively ending the First French Empire and the Napoleonic Wars, and marks the start of almost half a century of peace throughout Europe.	
1815	7 July	Second Restoration: With Napoleon exiled in Saint Helena, the House of Bourbon was again restored. Louis XVIII became King of France until his death on 16 September 1824.	
1820	13 February	Assassination of the Duke of Berry.	
1821	5 May	Death of Napoleon.	
1823	April	French invasion of Spain: France started its invasion of Spain, eventually succeeding and restoring the monarchy, ending the Liberal Triennium.	
1830	26-29 July	July Revolution or French Revolution of 1830: the conservative House of Bourbon is overthrown and replaced by the more liberal Orleans Monarchy with Louis Philippe I becoming King of France.	
1830	3 February	End of the Greek War of Independence; Greece wins their independence when Russia, France, and Britain finally agree on the terms of the Treaty of London.	
1831	22 November	First Canut revolt: first clearly defined worker uprising of the Industrial Revolution.	
1832	5 June	June Rebellion: Unsuccessful Anti-monarchist insurrection in Paris.	
1835	28 July	The Fieschi attentat: In Paris, the assassination of Louis Philippe I is attempted by Giuseppe Marco Fieschi using a home-made volley gun. Eighteen are killed but the King escapes with a minor wound.	
1839	9 March	Pastry War: Victorious French troops withdraw from Mexico after their demands were satisfied.	
1848	February	February Revolution or French Revolution of 1848: Republican riots forced King Louis Philippe I to abdicate and flee to England.	
1848	20 December	Louis Napoleon Bonaparte starts his term as the first president of the French Second Republic.	
1848		European Revolutions of 1848	
1851	2 December	Exactly one year after his coup d'état, president Louis-Napoléon Bonaparte becomes Napoleon III, ending the Second Republic and creating the Second French Empire with him as emperor.	
1853–1856	28 March	Crimean War: France and Britain formally declared war on Russia.	
1860		Following the Franco-Sardinian victory over the Austrian Empire in the Second Italian War of Independence, Italian regions of Nice and Savoy were transferred to the French Empire as a reward.	
1860	18 October	Second Opium War: British and French troops entered the Forbidden City in Beijing.	
1866	31 May	French intervention in Mexico: French troops start withdrawing from the country.	
1870–1940		Third Republic	
1871	10 May	The end of the Franco-Prussian War: France's loss marked the downfall of Napoleon III and led to the end of the Second French Empire. The Third Republic was subsequently declared and Napoleon III went into exile in the United Kingdom until his death.	
1871	26 March	The Paris Commune was declared and lasted 2 months before being violently suppressed by the French army.	
1871	31 August	Adolphe Thiers began his term as president of France.	
1873	24 May	Patrice de Mac-Mahon began his term as president of France.	
1879	30 January	Jules Grévy began his term as president of France.	
1887	28 January	Work begins on the foundations of the Eiffel Tower.	
1887	3 December	Marie François Sadi Carnot began his term as president of France.	
1888	20 March	First Stage of the Eiffel Tower is completed.	
1888	21 August	Second Stage of the Eiffel Tower is completed.	
1889	15 May	The Eiffel Tower is opened to the public.	
1889	26 May	The Eiffel Tower lifts begin service.	
1894	4 January	The Franco-Russian Alliance was confirmed.	
1894	27 June	Jean Casimir-Perier began his term as president of France.	
1894	November	The Dreyfus affair begins, creating a scandal which will mobilize intellectuals and divide the French population for a decade.	
1895	17 January	Félix Faure began his term as president of France.	
1899	18 February	Émile Loubet began his term as president of France.	

== 20th century ==
Year	Date	Event
1904	8 April	The Entente Cordiale was signed, as an agreement mainly based on imperial issues. With the Anglo-Russian Entente of 1907, France, Britain and Russia were known as the Triple Entente in opposition to the Triple Alliance of Germany, Austria and Italy.
1905	15 December	The 1905 French law on the separation of Church and State ended government funding of religious groups.
1906	18 February	Armand Fallières began his term as president of France.
1913	18 February	Raymond Poincaré began his term as president of France.
1914	3 August	French entry into World War I: Germany declared war on France.
1918	11 November	World War I: The first armistice at Compiègne was signed between France and Germany, ending the Great War. France regained Alsace-Lorraine.
1923	January	Beginning of Franco-Belgian occupation of the Ruhr.
1924	13 June	Gaston Doumergue began his term as president of France.
1931	13 June	Paul Doumer began his term as president of France.
1932	10 May	Albert Lebrun began his term as president of France.
1934	6 February	Riots by far-right leagues were repressed by the state in what was considered as a failed coup d'état, and a major political crisis of the Third Republic.
1937	25 May	International Exposition of Art and Technology in Modern Life was opened in Paris in 1937. Place de Varsovie in Paris in 1937 (Agfacolor photo).
1939	3 September	Second World War: France declared war on Germany.
1939	7 September	Saar Offensive
1940	9 May	The Battle of France begins.
1940	18 June	Charles de Gaulle makes his Appeal of 18 June.
1940	25 June	Second World War: The Second Armistice at Compiègne was put into effect after the French and British armies were heavily defeated in the Battle of France by the Germans. The northern half of France was occupied by German forces and the southern part was governed by the collaborationist Vichy Government led by Marshal Philippe Pétain.
1940	27 October	Battle of Gabon
1941	8 June	Syria–Lebanon campaign
1942	11 November	Case Anton
1944	6 June	Normandy landings
1944	25 August	Second World War – Liberation of Paris: In what is considered the last battle of the Allied Operation Overlord, Free French Forces and the French Resistance, liberated Paris from German occupation.
1945	22 April	Capture of the Sigmaringen enclave
1945	24 October	Establishment of the United Nations (UN) with France having a veto on the Security Council.
1945	8 May	Complete liberation of the rest of France as the Allies finish off the few pockets of German Resistance
1946	13 October	France adopted the constitution of the Fourth Republic.
1947	16 January	Vincent Auriol began his term as the first president of the Fourth Republic.
1951	18 April	Treaty of Paris: Establishment of the European Coal and Steel Community (ECSC) between France, West Germany, Italy, and the Benelux countries, producing diplomatic and economic stability in Europe between former enemy states. The ECSC is credited as one of the major "ancestors" of the European Union.
1954	16 January	René Coty began his term as president of France.
1954	1 August	End of the 8-year long Indochina War. The following Geneva Conference (1954) agreed to dividing Vietnam. France departed from the country in a move that started worldwide decolonization of the French colonial empire.
1957	25 March	Treaties of Rome: The Inner Six countries (including France) signed two treaties establishing the European Economic Community (EEC) and the European Atomic Energy Community (EAEC).
1959	8 January	Charles de Gaulle became the first president of the Fifth Republic, whose new constitution greatly increased the President's powers (as opposed the Third and Fourth Republics, in which the office of President of the Republic was a largely ceremonial and powerless one).
1962	19 March	End of the Algerian War, Algeria, a French colony, obtained independence from France after almost 8 years of official strife.
1965	8 April	Merger Treaty: this treaty merged the ECSC, the EEC and the EAEC into a single institutional structure known as the European Community.
1967	24 July	Charles de Gaulle's famous "Vive le Québec libre" speech provoked a diplomatic crisis in Canada–France relations.
1968	May–June	May '68: a series of protests, occupations and strikes against capitalism, consumerism and traditional institutions, values and order (part of the 1968 worldwide protests).
1969	20 June	Georges Pompidou began his term as president of France.
1974	27 May	Valéry Giscard d'Estaing began his term as president of France.
1981	21 May	François Mitterrand began his term as president of France.
1986	17 February	Single European Act : a major revision of the Treaty of Rome to establish a common market by the end of 1992. (to 28 February 1987)
1992	7 February	Maastricht Treaty: Members of the European Community (including France) signed a treaty creating what is now known as the European Union.
1995	17 May	Jacques Chirac began his term as president of France.
1998	12 July	France won the 1998 World Cup of football on home soil. This was their first FIFA World Cup title.
1998	31 December	Introduction of the euro: the exchange rates between the euro and legacy currencies (the franc for France) in the eurozone became fixed.

== 21st century ==
Year	Date	Event
2001		"French government adopts a law that requires every French Web page to be officially archived."
2002	2 January	Introduction of the first euro coins and bills replacing the legacy currency, the franc.
2004	15 March	A law bans "conspicuous" religious symbols in schools. The law is renowned to target the Islamic headscarf, but forbids also Christian and Jewish symbols.
2005	October and November	2005 French riots.
2007	15 May	Nicolas Sarkozy began his term as president of France.
2010	14 September	A law to ban face covering from public space is passed by the Senate of France. The law had been previously passed by the National Assembly of France on 13 July 2010. The law is renowned to target the burqa and the niqāb, that President Sarkozy declared "not welcome" in France.
2011	19 March	France leads the NATO intervention in Libya to overthrow Muammar Gaddafi. The Libyan leader is eventually killed on 20 October 2011.
2012	6 May	François Hollande began his term as president of France.
2013	11 January	Beginning of the French intervention in Mali against Islamic militants known as Operation Serval (11 January 2013 – 15 July 2014)
2013	18 May	Same-sex marriage becomes legal in France, the 13th country worldwide to allow it.
2015	7–9 January	17 people, including three police officers, are killed in two terrorist attacks by Muslim terrorists; the Charlie Hebdo shooting targeted a magazine which published cartoons of Mohammed.
2015	10–11 January	Some 3.7 million people demonstrate nationwide against terrorism and for freedom of speech following the terrorist attack at Charlie Hebdo.
2015	13 November	ISIS sends 3 teams of suicide bombers to attack multiple targets in Paris including a soccer stadium, a concert, and several restaurants; over 120 dead.
2016	14 July	2016 Nice truck attack: A cargo truck was deliberately driven into crowds of people celebrating Bastille Day on the Promenade des Anglais, Nice resulting in the deaths of 86 people and the injury of 458 others.
2017	14 May	Emmanuel Macron began his term as president of France.
2018	15 July	France wins the 2018 FIFA World Cup.
2018	17 November	The start of the yellow vests protests.
2020	16 October	Murder of Samuel Paty
2024	18 January	2024 French farmers' protests are held against French and EU agricultural policy.

== See also ==
- History of French foreign relations
- History of France
- Category:Timelines of cities in France
- Timeline of 19th-century French history

== Bibliography ==
=== In English ===
- Langer, William. An Encyclopedia of World History (5th ed. 1973); highly detailed outline of events online free
- Morris, Richard B. and Graham W. Irwin, eds. Harper Encyclopedia of the Modern World: A Concise Reference History from 1760 to the Present (1970) online
- Charles E. Little (1900), "France", Cyclopedia of Classified Dates, New York: Funk & Wagnalls
- Henry Smith Williams, ed. (1908). "Chronological Summary of the History of France". France, Netherlands. Historians' History of the World. Vol. 13. London: Hooper & Jackson. hdl:2027/njp.32101063964827.
- Benjamin Vincent (1910), "France", Haydn's Dictionary of Dates (25th ed.), London: Ward, Lock & Co.
- Echard, William E. Historical Dictionary of the French Second Empire, 1852–1870 (1985)
- Hutton, Patrick H. and Amy J. Staples, et al. Historical Dictionary of the Third French Republic, 1870–1940 (2 vol 1986)
- Northcutt, M. Wayne. Historical Dictionary of the French Fourth and Fifth Republics, 1946–1991 (1992)
- Kibler, et al. Medieval France: An Encyclopedia (1995)
- Gino Raymond (2008). "Chronology". Historical Dictionary of France. Scarecrow Press. ISBN 978-0-8108-6256-2.
- Graham Robb (2008). "Chronology". Discovery of France: A Historical Geography. W. W. Norton. ISBN 978-0-393-06882-5.

=== In French ===
- Jules Michelet (1834). Tableau chronologique de l'histoire moderne (in French) (2nd ed.). Brussels: Hauman – via HathiTrust. (+ via Google Books)
- Manuel chronologique (in French). Paris: Société pour la propagation de l'éducation libre. 1877. (coverage includes France)
- Charles Dreyss (1883). Chronologie universelle. Histoire universelle (in French) (5th ed.). Paris: Hachette – via HathiTrust. (coverage includes France) (+ pt.1, pt.2 via Google Books)
- Patrick Boucheron, ed. (2017). Histoire mondiale de la France [Global History of France] (in French). Paris: Éditions du Seuil. ISBN 978-2-02-133629-0.
