= Family tree of French monarchs (simplified) =

These are combined simplified family trees of all Frankish and French monarchs, from Childeric I to Napoleon III.

== Family trees ==
Some families are disconnected from others but are placed here to show their disconnection and contemporaneity.

Merovingians
Merovech c. 411 – c. 458
Childeric I 440–481/482; King of the Salian Franks r. 457–481/482
Clovis I 466–511; King of the Franks r. 509–511
Chlothar I c. 497–561; King of the Franks r. 558–561
Chilperic I c. 539 – c. 584; King of Neustria r. 561–584
Chlothar II; 584–629; King of the Franks r. 613–629
Dagobert I c. 603/605–639; King of the Franks r. 629–634
Clovis II; 634–657/658; King of Neustria and Burgundy r. 639–657
Childeric II c. 653–675; King of the Franks r. 673–675	Chlothar III; 652–736; King of the Franks r. 661–662	Theuderic III; 654–691; King of the Franks r. 679–691
Clovis IV; 682–695; King of the Franks r. 691–695	Childebert III; 670/683–711; King of the Franks r. 695–711
Chilperic II is most likely, but not certainly, son of Childeric II	Carolingian
Chilperic II c. 672 – c. 721; King of the Franks r. 715–717	Dagobert III; 699–715; King of the Franks r. 711–715	Charles Martel c. 688–741; Mayor of the Palace
Theuderic IV c. 712 – c. 737; King of the Franks r. 721–737	Pepin the Short c. 714–768; King of the Franks r. 751–768
Childeric III is son of either Chilperic II or Theuderic IV
Childeric III c. 717 – c. 754; King of the Franks r. 743–751	Charlemagne; 742/747/748–814; King of the Franks r. 768–814	Carloman I 751–771; King of the Franks r. 768–771
Louis I the Pious; 778–840; King of the Franks r. 814–840
Louis II the German c. 810–876; King of East Francia r. 843–876	Charles II the Bald; 823–877; King of the Franks r. 840–877
Robertian
Robert the Strong; Margrave of Neustria c. 830–866	Charles III the Fat; 839–888; King of the Franks r. 884–888	Louis II the Stammerer; 846–879; King of the Franks r. 877–879
Odo c. 852–898; King of the Franks r. 887–898	Robert I 866–923; King of the Franks r. 922–923	Louis III; 863/865–882; King of the Franks r. 879–882	Carloman II c. 866–884; King of the Franks r. 879–884	Charles III the Simple; 879–929; King of West Francia r. 898–922
Bosonids
Rudolph c. 890–936; King of the Franks r. 923–936	Emma of France ?-934	Hugh the Great; 898–956; Duke of the Franks	Hedwig of Saxony c. 910–965	Gerberga of Saxony c. 913–968/ 969/984?	Louis IV; 920–954; King of the Franks r. 936–954
Capetian
Hugh Capet c. 941–996; King of the Franks r. 987–996	Lothair; 941–986; King of the Franks r. 954–986
Robert II; 972–1031; King of the Franks r. 996–1031	Louis V c. 967 – c. 987; King of the Franks r. 986–987
Henry I 1008–1060; King of the Franks r. 1031–1060
Philip I 1052–1108; King of the Franks r. 1060–1108
Louis VI; 1081–1137; King of the Franks r. 1108–1137
Louis VII; 1120–1180; King of the Franks r. 1137–1180
Philip II; Augustus; 1165–1223; King of France r. 1180–1223
Louis VIII; 1187–1226; King of France r. 1223–1226
Louis IX; 1214–1270; King of France r. 1226–1270	House of Bourbon
Philip III; 1245–1285; King of France r. 1270–1285	Robert; 1256–1317; Count of Clermont
House of Valois
Philip IV; 1268–1314; King of France r. 1285–1314	Charles; 1270–1325; Count of Valois	Louis I 1279–1341; 1st Duke of Bourbon
Louis X 1289–1316; King of France r. 1314–1316	Philip V c. 1293–1322; King of France r. 1316–1322	Charles IV; 1294–1328; King of France r. 1322–1328	Philip VI; 1293–1350; King of France r. 1328–1350
John I 1316; King of France r. 1316	John II; 1319–1364; King of France r. 1350–1364	James I 1319–1362; Count of La Marche
Charles V 1338–1380; King of France r. 1364–1380	John I 1344–1393; Count of La Marche
Charles VI; 1368–1422; King of France r. 1380–1422	Louis I 1372–1407; Duke of Orléans	Louis; 1376–1446; Count of Vendôme
House of Valois-Orléans	House of Valois-Angoulême
Charles VII; 1403–1461; King of France r. 1422–1461	Charles; 1394–1465; Duke of Orléans	John; 1399–1467; Count of Angoulême
Louis XI; 1423–1483; King of France r. 1461–1483	John VIII; 1425–1477; Count of Vendôme
Charles VIII; 1470–1498; King of France r. 1483–1498	Louis XII; 1462–1515; King of France r. 1498–1515	Charles; 1459–1496; Count of Angoulême	Francis; 1470–1495; Count of Vendôme
Francis I 1494–1547; King of France r. 1515–1547	Charles; 1489–1537; Duke of Vendôme
Henry II; 1519–1559; King of France r. 1547–1559	Antoine; 1515–1562; King of Navarre r. 1555–1562
Francis II; 1544–1560; King of France r. 1559–1560	Charles IX; 1550–1574; King of France r. 1560–1574	Henry III; 1551–1589; King of France r. 1574–1589	Henry IV; 1553–1610; King of France r. 1589–1610
Louis XIII; 1601–1643; King of France r. 1610–1643
House of Orléans
Louis XIV; 1638–1715; King of France r. 1643–1715	Philippe I 1640–1701; Duke of Orléans
Louis; 1661–1711; Grand Dauphin
Louis; 1682–1712; Duke of Burgundy; Petit Dauphin	Philippe II; 1674–1723; Duke of Orléans
Louis XV; 1710–1774; King of France r. 1715–1774	Louis; 1703–1752; Duke of Orléans
Louis; 1729–1765; Dauphin of France	Louis Philippe I 1725–1785; Duke of Orléans
Bonaparte
Louis XVI; 1754–1793; King of France r. 1774–1792	Louis XVIII; 1755–1824; King of France r. 1814–1824	Charles X 1757–1836; King of France r. 1824–1830	Louis Philippe II; 1747–1793; Duke of Orléans	Carlo; Buonaparte; 1746–1785
Louis XVII; 1785–1795; King of France (claimant) r. 1793–1795	Louis Philippe I 1773–1850; King of the French r. 1830–1848	Napoleon; 1769–1821; Emperor of the French r. 1804–1814, 1815	Louis; Bonaparte; 1778–1846; King of Holland r. 1806–1810
Napoleon II; 1811–1832; Emperor of the French r. 1815	Napoleon III; 1808–1873; Emperor of the French r. 1852–1870

== See also ==
- Family tree of French monarchs
- Kingdom of France
- List of French monarchs
- List of French consorts
- List of heirs to the French throne
- Legitimist claimants to the throne of France—descendants of the Bourbons, rejecting all heads of state since 1830. Unionists recognized the Orléanist claimant after 1883.
- Orléanist claimants to the throne of France—descendants of Louis-Phillippe, a cadet Bourbon, rejecting all heads of state since 1848.
- Bonapartist claimants to the throne of France—descendants of Napoleon I and his brothers, rejecting all heads of state 1815–48, and since 1870.
- Jacobite claimants to the throne of France—descendants of King Edward III of England and thus his claim to the French throne (renounced by Hanoverian King George III upon union with Ireland), also claiming Scotland, and Ireland.

== Bibliography ==
- James, Edward. The Origins of France: From Clovis to the Capetians, 500-1000. New Studies in Medieval History. ISBN 978-0-3332-7052-3. OL 10495224M.
- James, Edward (1991). The Franks. Blackwell. ISBN 0-6311-7936-4.
- The history of France as recounted in the Grandes Chroniques de France, and particularly in the personal copy produced for King Charles V between 1370 and 1380 that is the saga of the three great dynasties, the Merovingians, Carolingians, and the Capetian Rulers of France, that shaped the institutions and the frontiers of the realm. This work was commissioned at a time that France was embroiled in the Hundred Years' War with England, a war fought over hereditary claims to the throne of France. It must therefore be read with a careful eye toward biases meant to justify the Capetian claims of continuity and inheritance.
- The Cambridge Illustrated History of France. Cambridge University Press.
- Fouracre, Paul; Gerberding, Richard A. Late Merovingian France: History and Hagiography, 640-720. Manchester University Press. ISBN 0-7190-4791-9.
- Geary, Patrick (1988). Before France and Germany: The Creation and Transformation of the Merovingian World. Oxford University Press. ISBN 0-1950-4458-4.
- Geary, Patrick (2001). The Myth of Nations: The Medieval Origins of Europe. Princeton University Press. ISBN 0-6911-1481-1.
