= Austrasia =

Kingdom within Frankish empire (511–751)

- 481–751
- Austrasia, homeland of the Franks (darkest green), and their subsequent conquests (other shades of green)
- Capital: Reims, Metz
- Common languages: Old Frankish, Vulgar Latin (Gallo-Roman), Latin, (Later) Old High German, (Later) Old Dutch
- Religion: Christianity
- Government: Monarchy
- King
- Historical era: Early Middle Ages
  - Established: 481
  - Disestablished: 751
Preceded by
Roman Gaul
Germania inferior
Germania superior
Succeeded by
Carolingian Empire

Austrasia was a historical region and the northeastern realm within the core of the Frankish State during the Early Middle Ages, centering on the regions between Meuse, Moselle, Middle Rhine and the Main rivers. It included the original Frankish-ruled territories within what had been the northernmost part of Roman Gaul. It also stretched beyond the old Roman borders on the Rhine into Frankish areas which had never been formally under Roman rule. It represented the northeastern part of the Frankish realm, founded by the Merovingian king Clovis I (r. 481–511), while the more Romanized regions to its west came to be known as Neustria.

Austrasia and Neustria along with Aquitaine and Burgundy to their south, formed the basis of subdivisions into which the Frankish Merovingian dynasty divided their realm. In the 8th and 9th centuries, their successors in the Carolingian dynasty, had their original powerbase in Austrasia. These two Frankish dynasties did not always have a single ruling monarch over the whole Frankish realm, and already by 561, Austrasia was ruled as a separate kingdom within the Frankish realm by the Merovingian king Sigebert I (561–575). Kings often allowed different family members to rule sub-kingdoms, and these were sometimes in conflict with each other, despite the underlying continuity of the overall Frankish state.

In the 843 Treaty of Verdun Austrasia was divided into two parts, with the parts east of the Rhine becoming a single East Francia kingdom together with the non-Frankish lands of the Saxons, Thuringians, Bavarians and Allamani, while in Gaul west of the Rhine forming the northernmost part of a new kingdom of Middle Francia which stretched to Italy. This kingdom was further divided in the Treaty of Prüm (855) and Austrasia became the realm of king Lothair II, whose name gave rise to the new term Lotharingia. Lotharingia was divided by the Treaty of Meerssen (870), but reunited by the Treaty of Ribemont (880), which also brought it under east Frankish rule. During the 9th century, Austrasia was still considered as one of the main regions (stem lands) within the Carolingian Empire, surrounded by Alamannia (to the south), Bavaria (to the south-east), Thuringia (to the north-east), and Saxony (to the north), as attested by the Royal Frankish Annals, and the Annals of Saint Bertin, that mentions not only Austrasia, but also Autrasians.

In time, central Austrasia was more frequently designated as Lotharingia, that became the prevailing term for those regions, while the eastern parts of Austrasia came to be known as Franconia.

== Etymology ==
The name Austrasia is not well attested in the Merovingian period. The first surviving record of the term is by Gregory of Tours, writing in about 580. It was later used by Aimoin of Fleury around 1000. It is presumably the latinization of an Old Frankish name, reconstructed as *Oster-rike ("Eastern Kingdom"). As with the name Austria, it contains the word for "east", and means "eastern land". The term designated the original territory of the Franks in contrast to Neustria, which apparently meant the "(new) western land".

== Geography ==
Austrasia was centered on the Middle Rhine, including the basins of the Moselle, Main and Meuse rivers. It bordered on Frisia and Saxony to the north, Thuringia to the east, Swabia and Burgundy to the south and to Neustria to the southwest. The exact boundary between Merovingian Neustria and Austrasia is unclear with respect to areas such as the medieval counties of Flanders, Brabant and Hainaut, and areas immediately to the south of these.

Metz served as the Austrasian capital, although some Austrasian kings ruled from Reims, Trier and Cologne. Other important cities included Verdun, Worms and Speyer. Fulda monastery, an important royal monastery, was founded in eastern Austrasia in the final decade of the Merovingian period.

In the High Middle Ages, its territory became divided among the duchies of Lotharingia and Franconia in Germany, with some western portions including Reims and Rethel passing to France.

Its exact boundaries were somewhat fluid over the history of the Frankish sub-kingdoms, but Austrasia can be taken to correspond roughly to the territory of present-day Luxembourg, parts of eastern Belgium, north-eastern France (Lorraine and Champagne-Ardenne), west-central Germany (the Rhineland, Hesse and Franconia) and the southern Netherlands (Limburg, North Brabant, with a salient north of the Rhine including Utrecht and parts of Gelderland).

== History ==
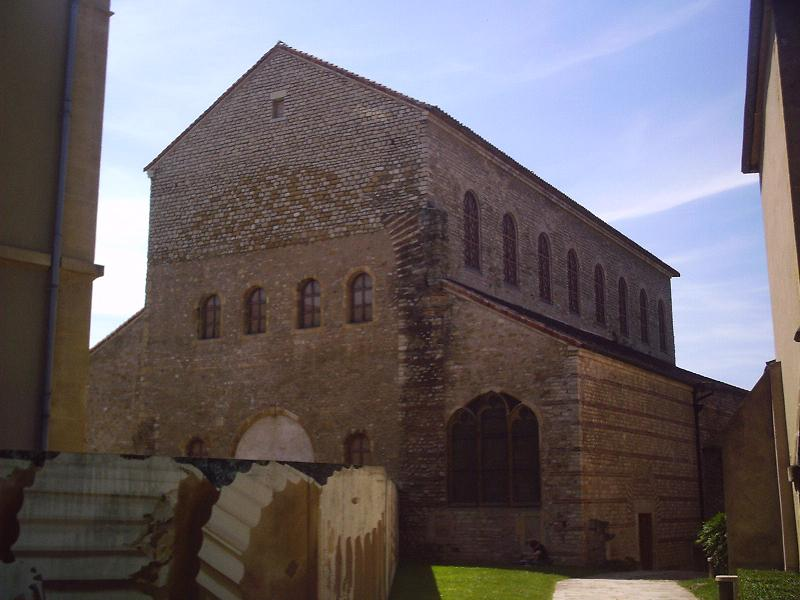
Ancient Basilica of Saint-Pierre-aux-Nonnains from the 4th century in Metz, capital of the kingdom of Austrasia

After the death of the Frankish king Clovis I in 511, his four sons partitioned his kingdom amongst themselves, with Theuderic I receiving the lands that were to become Austrasia. Descended from Theuderic, a line of kings ruled Austrasia until 555, when it was united with the other Frankish kingdoms of Chlothar I, who inherited all the Frankish realms by 558. He redivided the Frankish territory amongst his four sons, but the four kingdoms coalesced into three on the death of Charibert I in 567: Austrasia under Sigebert I, Neustria under Chilperic I, and Burgundy under Guntram. These three kingdoms defined the political division of Francia until the rise of the Carolingians and even thereafter.

From 567 to the death of Sigebert II in 613, Neustria and Austrasia fought each other almost constantly, with Burgundy playing the peacemaker between them. These struggles reached their climax in the wars between Brunhilda and Fredegund, queens, respectively, of Austrasia and Neustria. Finally, in 613, a rebellion by the nobility against Brunhilda saw her betrayed and handed over to her nephew and foe in Neustria, Chlothar II. Chlothar then took control of the other two kingdoms and set up a united Frankish kingdom with its capital in Paris. During this period the first majores domus or mayors of the palace appeared. These officials acted as mediators between the king and the people in each realm. The first Austrasian mayors came from the Pippinid family, which experienced a slow but steady ascent until it eventually displaced the Merovingians on the throne.

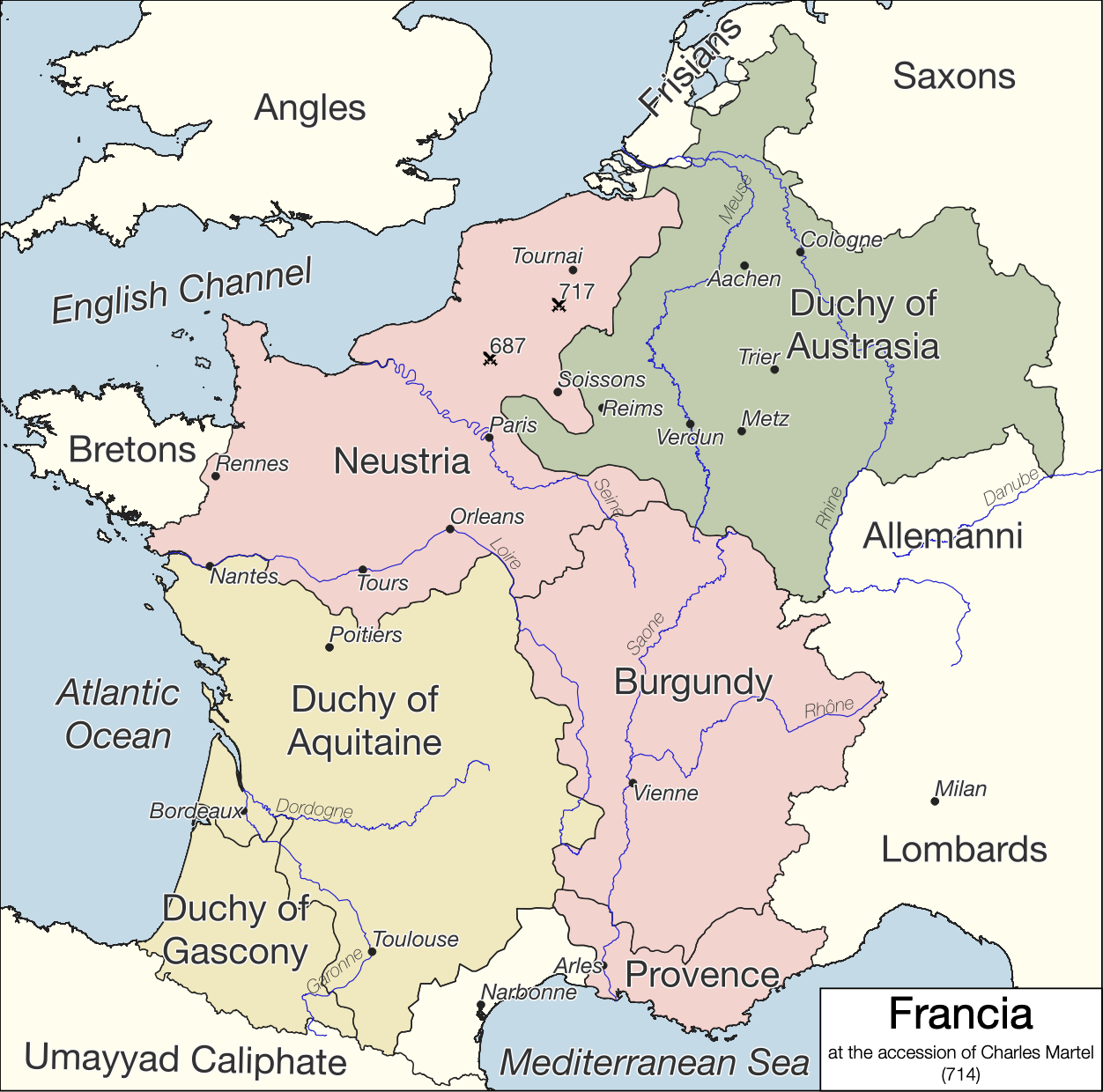
Map of Francia in 714 (Austrasia shown in green)

In 623, the Austrasians asked Chlothar II for a king of their own and he appointed his son Dagobert I to rule over them with Pepin of Landen as regent. Dagobert's government in Austrasia was widely admired. In 629, he inherited Neustria and Burgundy. Austrasia was again neglected until, in 633, the people demanded the king's son as their own king again. Dagobert complied and sent his elder son Sigebert III to Austrasia. Historians often categorise Sigebert as the first roi fainéant, or do-nothing king, of the Merovingian dynasty. His court was dominated by the mayors. In 657, the mayor Grimoald the Elder succeeded in putting his son Childebert the Adopted on the throne, where he remained until 662. Thereafter, Austrasia was predominantly the kingdom of the Arnulfing mayors of the palace and their base of power. With the Battle of Tertry in 687, Pepin of Heristal defeated the Neustrian king Theuderic III and established his mayoralty over all the Frankish kingdoms. This was even regarded by contemporaries as the beginning of his "reign". It also signalled the dominance of Austrasia over Neustria, which would last until the end of the Merovingian era.

In 718, Charles Martel had Austrasian support in his war against Neustria for control of all the Francian realms. He was not king himself, but appointed Chlothar IV to rule in Austrasia. In 719, Francia was united by Martel's family, the Carolingian dynasty, under Austrasian hegemony. While the Frankish kings continued to divide up the Frankish realm in different ways over subsequent generations, the term Austrasia was only used occasionally after the Carolingian dynasty.

== Rulers ==
=== Merovingian kings ===
- Theuderic I, 511–533
- Theudebert I, 533–548
- Theudebald, 548–555
- Chlothar I, 555–561
- Sigebert I, 561–575
- Childebert II, 575–595
- Theudebert II, 595–612
- Theuderic II, 612–613
- Sigebert II, 613
- Chlothar II, 613–623
- Dagobert I, 623–634
- Sigebert III, 634–656
- Childebert the Adopted, 656–661
- Chlothar III, 661–662
- Childeric II, 662–675
- Dagobert II, 675–679
- Theuderic III, 679–691
- Clovis IV, 691–695
- Childebert III, 695–711
- Dagobert III, 711–715
- Chilperic II, 715–717
- Chlothar IV, 717–720
- Chilperic II, 720–721 (again)
- Theuderic IV, 721–737
- Childeric III, 743–751

=== Mayors of the palace ===
- Parthemius, until 548
- Carloman, father of Pepin of Landen, c. 550-560
- Gogo, c. 567–581
- Wandalenus, from 581
- Gundulf, from 600
- Landric, until 612
- Warnachar, 612–617
- Hugh, 617–623
- Pepin I, 623–629
- Adalgisel, 633–639
- Pepin I, 639–640 (again)
- Otto, 640–643
- Grimoald I, 643–656
- Wulfoald, 656–680
- Pepin II, 680–714
- Theudoald, 714–715
- Charles Martel, 715–741
- Carloman, 741–747
- Pepin III, 747–751

== See also ==
- Duchy of Lotharingia
- Lower Lotharingia
- Upper Lotharingia
- Duchy of Franconia

== Sources ==
- McKitterick, Rosamond (1983). The Frankish Kingdoms Under the Carolingians, 751-987. Harlow: Longman. ISBN 978-0-582-49005-5.
- Nelson, Janet L. (1991). The Annals of St-Bertin. Manchester: Manchester University Press. ISBN 978-0-7190-3425-1.
- Riché, Pierre (1993). The Carolingians: A Family Who Forged Europe. Philadelphia: University of Pennsylvania Press. ISBN 0-8122-1342-4.
- Scholz, Bernhard W., ed. (1970). Carolingian Chronicles: Royal Frankish Annals and Nithard's Histories. Ann Arbor, MI: University of Michigan Press. ISBN 0-472-06186-0.
