= Parthemius =

Parthemius (or Parthenius) (died 548) was the mayor of the palace of Austrasia during the reign of Theudebert I. He was very unpopular with the people for the tributes he exacted. He was a glutton and a murderer too, having disposed of his friend Ausanius and his wife Papianella out of jealousy.

Soon after the death of the king in 548, the people conspired against him and he fled the capital to Treves in the company of two bishops. He hid in a church, but the townsmen sought him out and stoned him to death.
