= Savaric of Auxerre =

Savaric (died 715) was the Bishop of Auxerre from 710 until his death. A member of high nobility, he was a warrior who held a bishopric. He was the father of Eucherius, Bishop of Orleans.

He gathered a large army and subjected the region of the Nivernais, Avallonais, and Tonnerre to his rule during the reigns of Childebert III and Dagobert III. He marched a large army on Lyon but died in battle.

== Sources ==
- Geary, Patrick J. Before France and Germany. Oxford University Press: 1988.
