= Childeric III =

King of the Franks from 743 to 751

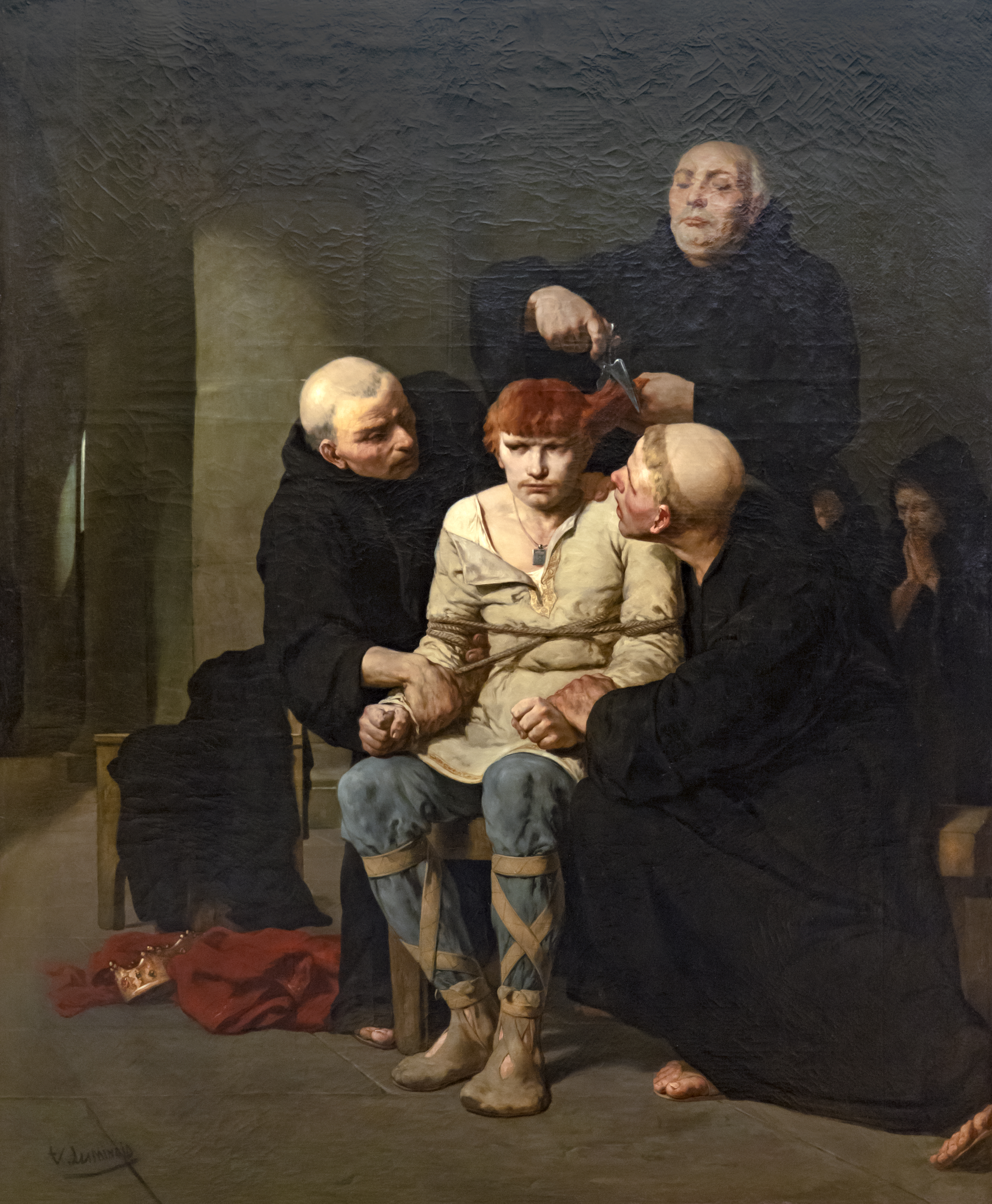
- The Last of the Merovingians, a painting by Évariste Vital Luminais, depicting the cutting of Childeric's hair

King of the Franks
- Reign: 743–751
- Predecessor: Theuderic IV
- Successor: Pepin the Short
- Born: c. 718/728
- Died: c. 754
- Issue: Theuderic
- Dynasty: Merovingian
- Father: Chilperic II or Theuderic IV

Childeric III (c. 718/728 – c. 755) was King of the Franks from 743 until he was deposed in 751 by Pepin the Short. He was the last Frankish king from the Merovingian dynasty. Once Childeric was deposed, Pepin became king, initiating the Carolingian dynasty.

== Background ==
Following the reign of Dagobert I (629–634), the power of the Merovingian kings gradually declined into a ceremonial role, while the real power in the Frankish kingdom was increasingly wielded by the mayors of the palace. In 718, Charles Martel combined the roles of mayor of the palace of Neustria and mayor of the palace of Austrasia, consolidating his position as the most powerful man in Francia. After the death of king Theuderic IV in 737, Charles Martel ruled without a king on the throne.

After Charles Martel's death in 741, Carloman and Pepin the Short, his sons by his first wife Rotrude, became co-mayors of the palace. However, they soon faced revolts from their younger half-brother Grifo and their brother-in-law Odilo, Duke of Bavaria. These revolts may have played a part in their decision to fill the throne with a Merovingian king after a six-year vacancy to add legitimacy to their reigns.

== Family ==
Although he was certainly a descendant of Clovis II, the identity of Childeric's father is uncertain. He may have been either the son of Chilperic II or Theuderic IV. It is possible, however, that his descent from Clovis II cannot now be traced. Earlier scholarship tended to treat him as a son of Theuderic IV, but more recent scholarship has preferred Chilperic II based on the arguments of Eugen Ewig.

In a forged charter attributed to Childeric, he refers to Theuderic IV as his parens (Late Latin relative), which has been taken as evidence that he was not his son. Martina Hartmann, however, argues that a 9th- or 10th-century forger would not necessarily have followed Merovingian terminological conventions and may have used the word in its classical sense of 'father'.

In another document, Childeric III describes Theuderic IV's father, Dagobert III, as his sobrinus (cousin) while confirming the latter's grant of immunity to the cathedral of Le Mans and is rights in Ardin. This document, however, has been tampered with and may be an outright forgery made in connection with the Le Mans forgeries.

The Deeds of the Abbots of Fontenelle, a chronicle of Fontenelle Abbey (Saint-Wandrille) written after 833, quotes several Merovingian charters. One from the abbacy of Hugh is dated to "the eleventh year of King Theuderic, father of Childeric, the latest king of the Merovingian line". The charters in the Deeds are generally considered reliable. One Frankish regnal list, known from a 10th-century manuscript from the abbey of Saint-Denis, contains the comment "Theuderic [IV] fathered Childeric [III], who was placed in the monastery of Saint-Bertin".

Naming customs do not favour one thesis over another, since Childeric may have been named after his grandfather (Childeric II, father of Chilperic II) or else may have named his own son, Theuderic, after his father (Theuderic IV). If he was a son of Chilperic, he must have been born during his father's reign (715–721), since his father was a monk before that; if a son of Theuderic, he must have been born later, since Theuderic was only born in the years 712–715. Theuderic was probably married at the age of about fifteen, as was typical for Merovingians.

== Reign ==
Clause dating a document to the second year of "Childeric king of the Franks" (Latin childerici regis francorum, second line from the bottom)

Childeric was raised to the throne sometime between 16 February and 2 March 743. He was probably between 15 and 25 years old at the time. A charter recording the donation of a woman named Grimhild to the monastery of Wissembourg, dated 15 February 743 in the second year of Carloman and Pepin, provides the earliest possible date for the end of the interregnum. On 2 March in his first year, he issued a charter at Compiègne to Bishop Gauziolenus of Le Mans confirming his immunities. Since the Capitulary of Soissons of 3 March 744 is already dated to Childeric's second year, the king must have issued his charter for Le Mans in 743. Thus, Childeric's first year began no later than 2 March 743. Margarete Weidemann thinks it most likely that he was elevated to the throne at the Marchfield on 1 March.

Childeric's charters name Carloman and Pepin almost as co-rulers. In the computistical manuscript London, British Library, Cotton Caligula A. XV, there is a dating clause from Childeric's first year, describing 743 as "the first year of Childeric, the king of the Franks, with his consuls Carloman and Pepin". In a charter issued in July 744, Childeric refers to Carloman as "ruler of our palace, who placed us upon the throne of the kingdom".

According to Einhard's Life of Charlemagne, Childeric took little part in public business and would be brought once a year in an ox cart led by a peasant to preside at court on a throne, giving answers prepared by the mayors to visiting ambassadors. In this narrative, he had neither political nor economic power, depending on his own small estate and on mayoral support. In Einhard's words:

Nothing was left for the king [to do] except sit on his throne with his hair long and his beard uncut, satisfied [to hold] the name of king only and pretending to rule. He listened to representatives who came from various lands and, as they departed, he seemed to give them decisions of his own, which he had been taught or rather ordered [to pronounce]. Except for the empty name of 'king' and a meager living allowance, which the prefect of the court extended to him as it suited him, he possessed nothing else of his own but one estate with a very small income. On that estate, he had a house and servants who ministered to his needs and obeyed him, but there were few of them. He traveled about on a cart that was pulled by yoked oxen and led, as happens in the countryside, by a herdsman to wherever he needed to go. In this way he used to go to the palace and so also to the public assembly of his people, which was held annually for the good of the kingdom, and in this manner he also returned home.

== Deposition ==
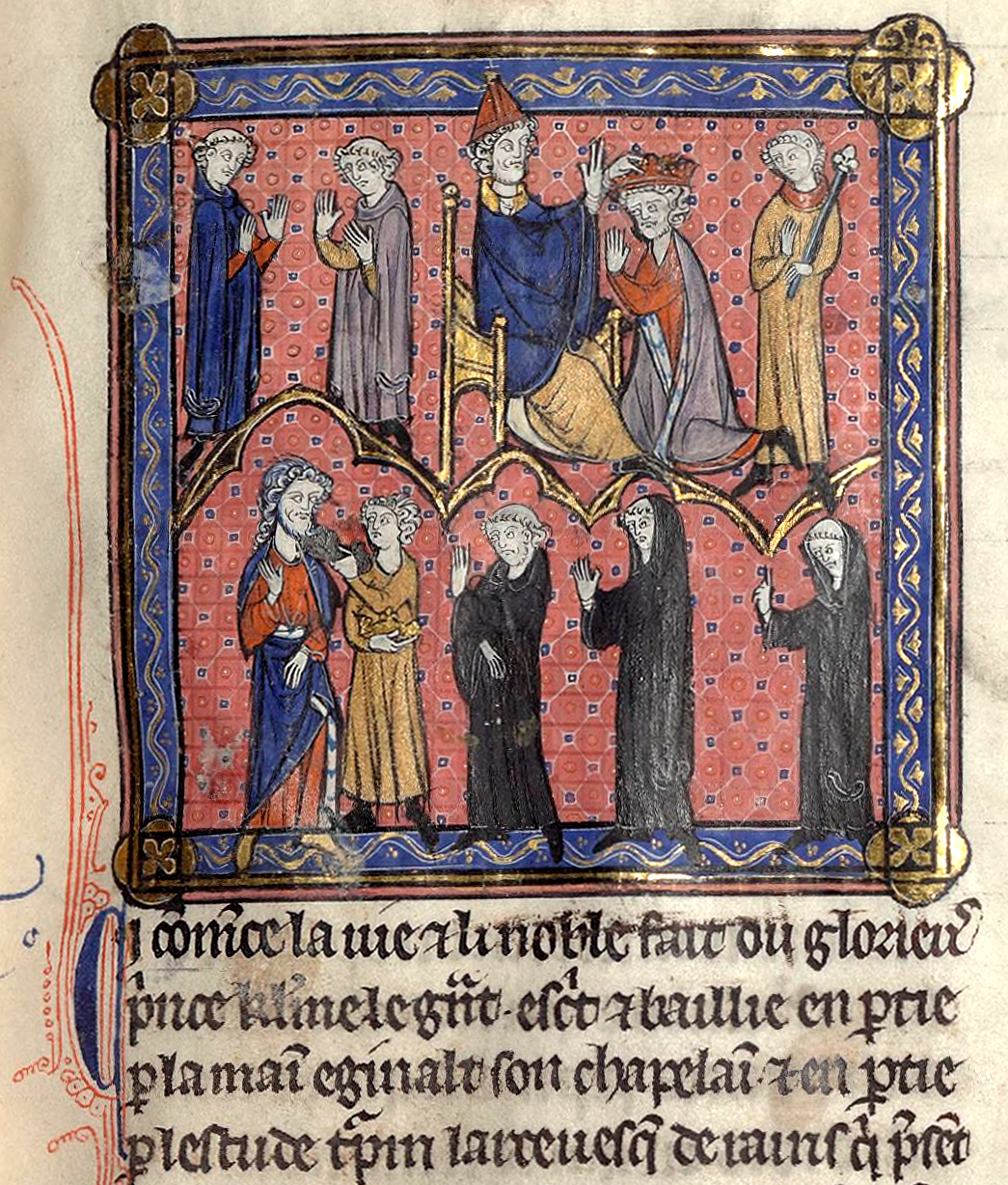
Pope Stephen crowning Pepin (top) and the deposition of Childeric (bottom), from Sainte-Geneviève MS 782, a copy of the Grandes Chroniques de France

After Carloman retired to a monastery in 747, Pepin resolved to take the royal crown for himself. Pepin sent letters to Pope Zachary, asking whether the title of king belonged to the one who had exercised the power or the one with the royal lineage. The pope responded that the real power should have the royal title as well. In 751, Childeric was dethroned and tonsured. According to Einhard, who sought to justify the deposition:

The family of the Merovingians, from which the Franks used to make their kings, is thought to have lasted down to King Childeric, whom Pope Stephen [II] ordered deposed. His hair was shorn and he was forced into a monastery. Although it might seem that the family ended with him, it had in fact been without vitality for a long time and demonstrated that there was nothing of any worth in it except the empty name of 'king'.

Childeric's long hair was the symbol of his dynasty, and thus of the royal powers he enjoyed; by cutting it, they divested him of all royal prerogatives. Once dethroned, he was confined to the Benedictine monastery of Saint-Bertin. The deposition took place between 23 September and 22 October.

According to the Deeds of the Abbots of Fontenelle, Childeric had a son named Theuderic who was sent to the monastery of Fontenelle. There are conflicting accounts of exactly when Childeric died, with some sources claiming as early as 753, while others state that his death occurred as late as 758.

== Sources ==
- Barnwell, P. S. (2005). "Einhard, Louis the Pious and Childeric III". Historical Research. 78 (200): 129–39. doi:10.1111/j.1468-2281.2005.00224.x.
- Bouchard, Constance B. (2013). "Childeric III and the Emperors Drogo Magnus and Pippin the Pious". Medieval Prosopography. 28: 1–16.
- De Jong, Mayke (2001). "Monastic Prisoners or Opting Out? Political Coercion and Honour in the Frankish Kingdoms". In Frans Theuws; Mayke de Jong; Carine Van Rhijn (eds.). Topographies of Power in the Early Middle Ages. Brill. pp. 291–327.
- Dutton, Paul E., ed. (1998). Charlemagne's Courtier: The Complete Einhard. Broadview Press.
- Enright, Michael (1985). Iona, Tara, and Soissons: The Origin of the Royal Anointing Ritual. Walter de Gruyter.
- Fouracre, Paul (2000). The Age of Charles Martel. Pearson.
- Fouracre, Paul (2005). "The Long Shadow of the Merovingians". In Joanna Story (ed.). Charlemagne: Empire and Society. Manchester University Press. pp. 5–21.
- Frassetto, Michael, ed. (2003). "Childeric III (d.754)". Encyclopedia of Barbarian Europe: Society in Transformation. ABC-CLIO. pp. 118–119. ISBN 978-1-57607-263-9.
- Geary, Patrick J. (1988). Before France and Germany: The Creation and Transformation of the Merovingian World. Oxford: Oxford University Press.
- Hartmann, Martina (2002). "Pater incertus? Zu den Vätern des Gegenkönigs Chlothar IV. (717–718) und des letzten Merowingerkönigs Childerich III. (743–751)". Deutsches Archiv für Erforschung des Mittelalters. 58: 1–15.
- McKitterick, Rosamond (1999). The Frankish Kingdoms under the Carolingians. Longman.
- Tierney, Brian (1964). The Crisis of Church and State, 1050–1300. Prentice Hall.
- Warntjes, Immo (2011). "The Computus Cottonianus of AD 689: A Computistical Formulary Written for Willibrord's Frisian Mission". The Easter Controversy of Late Antiquity and the Early Middle Ages. Brepols. pp. 173–212. doi:10.1484/M.STT-EB.1.100734.
- Weidemann, Margarete (1998). "Zur Chronologie der Merowinger im 7. und 8. Jahrhundert". Francia. 25 (1): 177–230. doi:10.11588/fr.1998.1.61147.
- Wood, Ian N. (1994). The Merovingian Kingdoms, 450–751. Harlow: Longman.

Vacant Title last held by Theuderic IV	King of the Franks; 743–751	Succeeded by Pepin
