= List of French monarchs =

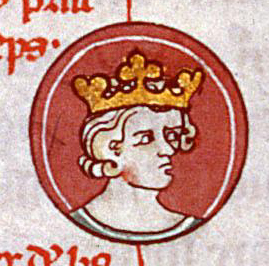
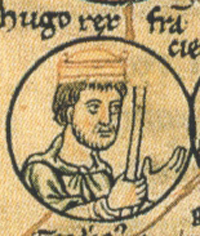
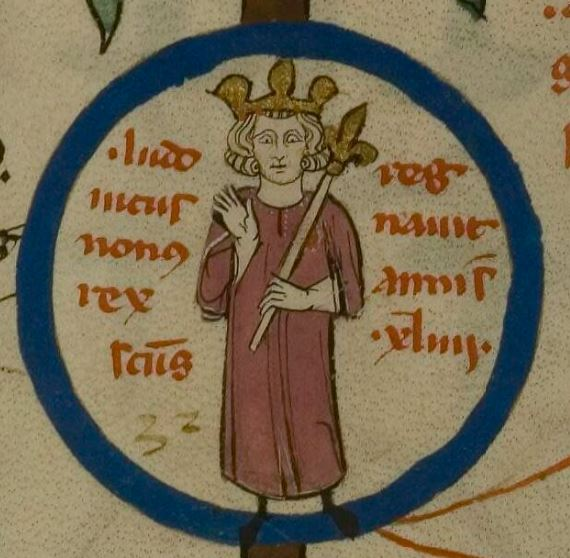
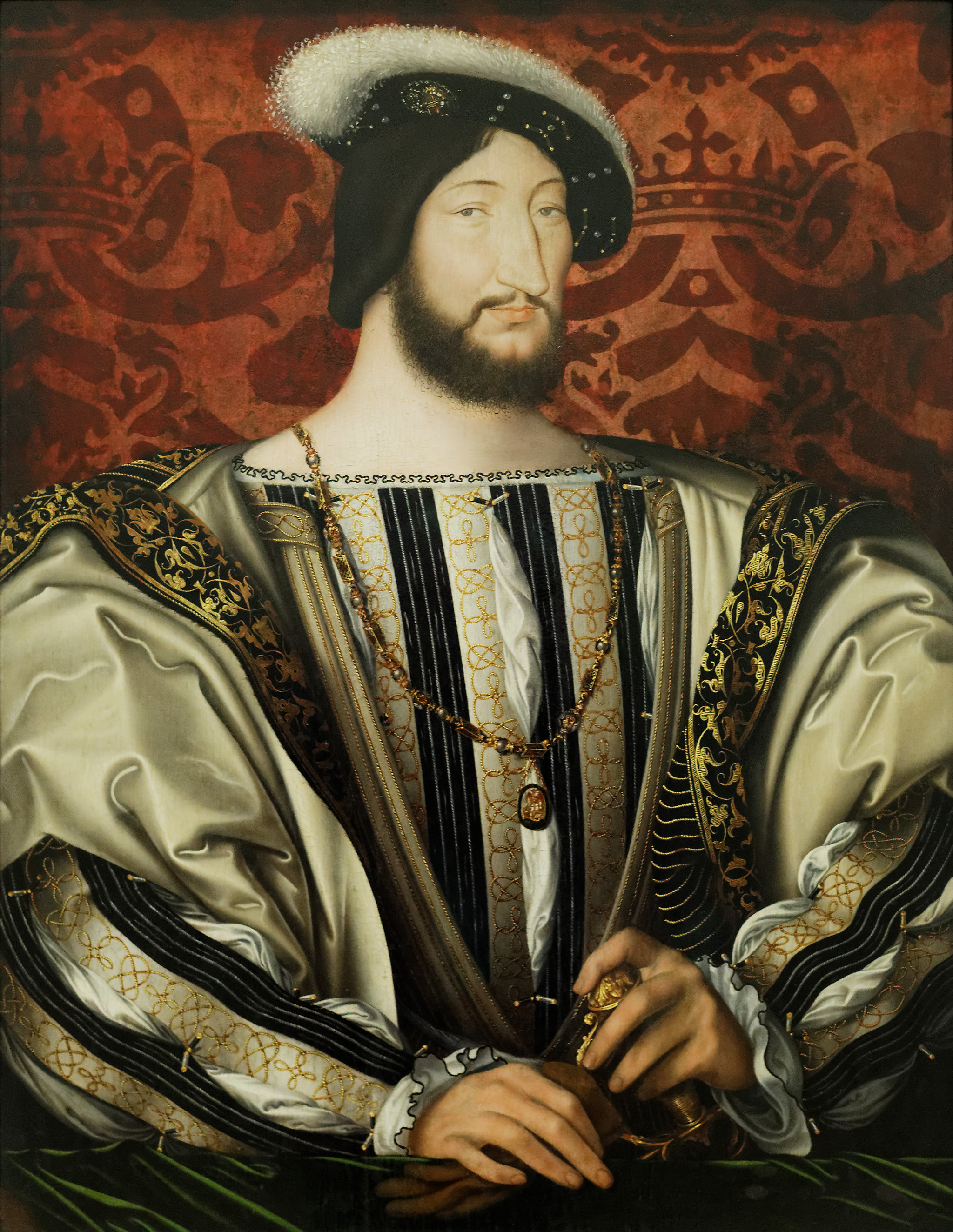
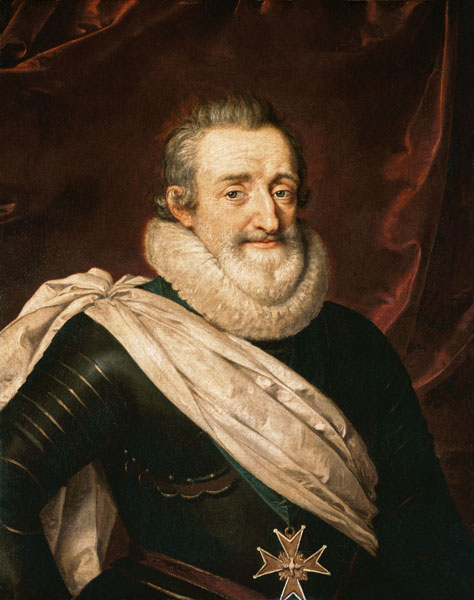
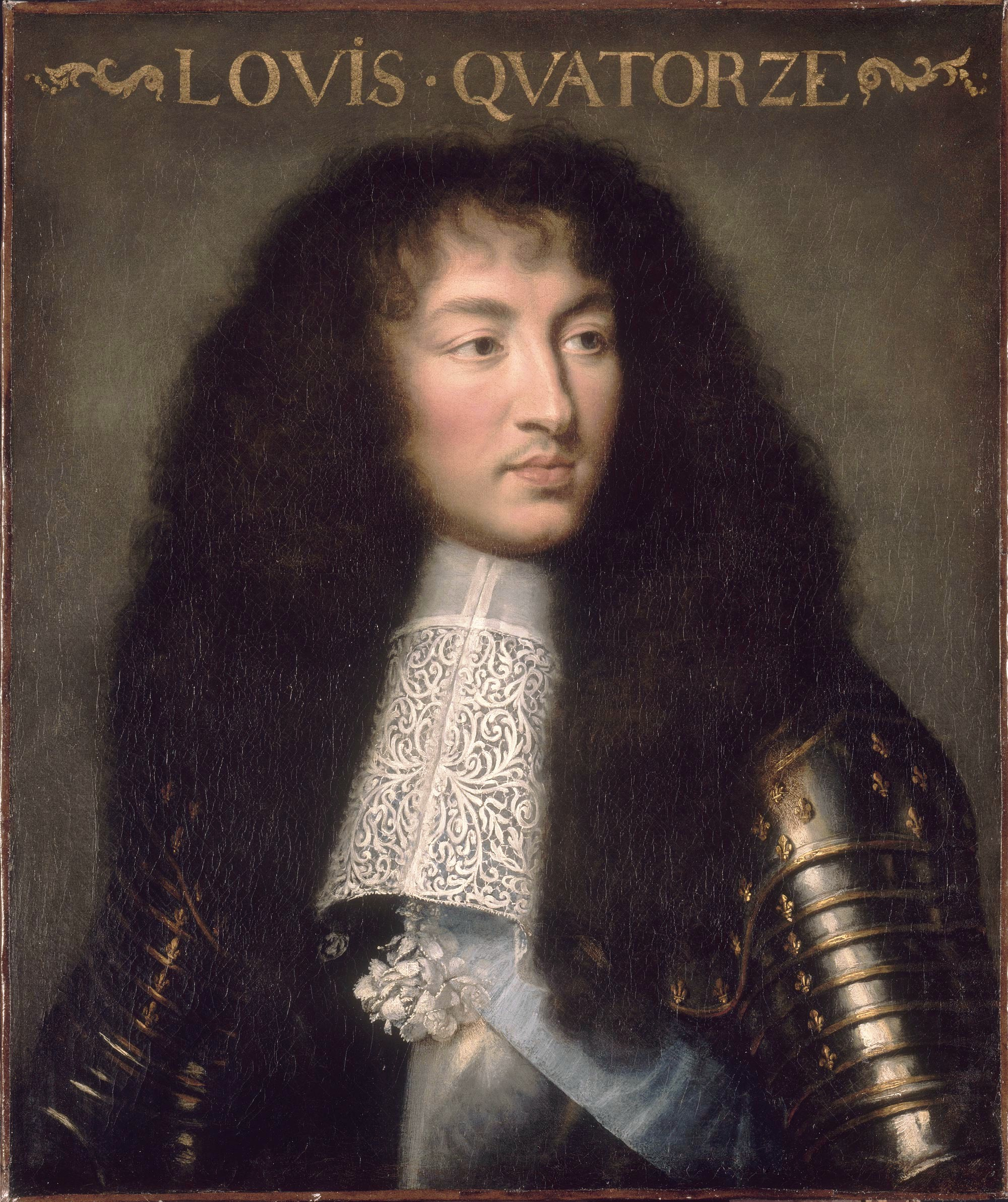
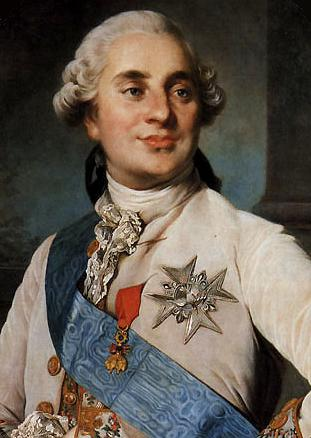
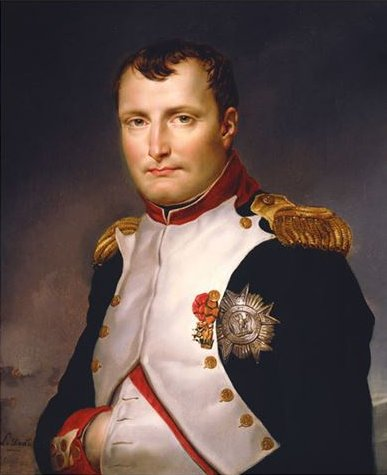
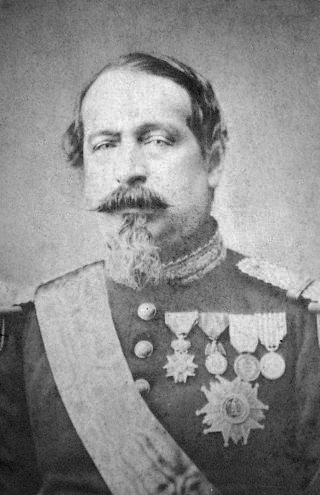
From top; left to right: Robert I, Hugh Capet, Louis IX, Francis I, Henry IV, Louis XIV, Louis XVI, Napoleon I, Napoleon III

The family tree of Frankish and French monarchs (509–1870)

France was ruled by monarchs from the establishment of the kingdom of West Francia in 843 until the end of the Second French Empire in 1870, with several interruptions.

Classical French historiography usually regards Clovis I, king of the Franks (r. 507–511), as the first king of France. However, most historians today consider that such a kingdom did not begin until the establishment of West Francia, after the fragmentation of the Carolingian Empire in the 9th century.

== Titles ==
The kings used the title "King of the Franks" (Latin: Rex Francorum) until the late twelfth century; the first to adopt the title of "King of France" (Latin: Rex Franciae; French: roi de France) was Philip II in 1190 (r. 1180–1223), after which the title "King of the Franks" gradually lost ground. However, Francorum Rex continued to be sometimes used, for example by Louis XII in 1499, by Francis I in 1515, and by Henry II in about 1550; it was also used on coins up to the eighteenth century.

During the brief period when the French Constitution of 1791 was in effect (1791–1792) and after the July Revolution in 1830, the style "King of the French" (roi des Français) was used instead of "King of France (and Navarre)". It was a constitutional innovation known as popular monarchy which linked the monarch's title to the French people rather than to the possession of the territory of France.

With the House of Bonaparte, the title "Emperor of the French" (Empereur des Français) was used in 19th-century France, during the first and second French Empires, between 1804 and 1814, again in 1815, and between 1852 and 1870.

From the 14th century down to 1801, the English (and later British) monarch claimed the throne of France, though such claim was purely nominal excepting a short period during the Hundred Years' War when Henry VI of England had control over most of Northern France, including Paris. By 1453, the English had been mostly expelled from France and Henry's claim has since been considered illegitimate; French historiography commonly does not recognize Henry VI of England among the kings of France.

== Frankish kings (843–987) ==
=== Carolingian dynasty (843–887) ===
The Carolingians were a Frankish noble family with origins in the Arnulfing and Pippinid clans of the 7th century AD. The family consolidated its power in the 8th century, eventually making the offices of mayor of the palace and dux et princeps Francorum hereditary and becoming the real powers behind the Merovingian kings. The dynasty is named after one of these mayors of the palace, Charles Martel, whose son Pepin the Short dethroned the Merovingians in 751 and, with the consent of the Papacy and the aristocracy, was crowned King of the Franks. Under Charles the Great (r. 768–814), better known as "Charlemagne", the Frankish kingdom expanded deep into Central Europe, conquering Italy and most of modern Germany. He was also crowned "Emperor of the Romans" by the Pope, a title that was eventually carried on by the German rulers of the Holy Roman Empire.

Charlemagne was succeeded by his son Louis the Pious (r. 814–840), who eventually divided the kingdom between his sons. His death, however, was followed by a three-year-long civil war that ended with the Treaty of Verdun, which divided Francia into three kingdoms, one of which (Middle Francia) was short-lived. Modern France developed from West Francia, while East Francia became the Holy Roman Empire and later Germany. By this time, the eastern and western parts of the land had already developed different languages and cultures.

Portrait / coin	Name	Reign	Succession	Life details
	Charles II "the Bald" (Note: Louis the Pious and Charlemagne are both enumerated as "Louis I" and "Charles I" in the lists of French and German monarchs.)	c. 10 August 843 (Note: Charles II was crowned emperor on 25 December 875. For later Frankish and German emperors, see Holy Roman Emperor.) – 6 October 877 (34 years and 2 months)	Son of Louis the Pious and grandson of Charlemagne; recognized as king of West Francia after the Treaty of Verdun	13 June 823 (Note: Older scholars give his birth as 15 May, the ides of May. However, ancient sources record his birth as 13 June, the ides of June.) – 6 October 877 (aged 54) King of Aquitaine since 838. Crowned "Emperor of the Romans" on Christmas 875. Died of natural causes
	Pepin II (rival king in Aquitaine)	845–852 (disputed; 7 years)	Son of Pepin I of Aquitaine and grandson of Louis the Pious, claimed Charles' domains in Aquitaine since 838 and later forced him to recognize him as king	c. 823 – 864 (aged c. 41) Lost recognition in 848 and was captured in 852. Escaped but was later executed
	Charles the Child (junior king in Aquitaine)	848–863 and 865–866 (under Charles II)	Son of Charles the Bald	847/48 – 29 September 866 (aged 19–18) Never held real power; died after a head injury
	Louis the German (rival)	c. 858 – June 860 (disputed; less than 2 years)	Brother of Charles the Bald and King of East Francia (Germany); claimed the throne of the West and invaded his brother's territories	c. 806 – 28 August 876 (aged c. 70) Abandoned his claim after a peace treaty.
Non-contemporary	Carloman (claimant)	c. 870 – 873 (disputed; 3 years)	Son of Charles the Bald intended for an ecclesiastical career, rebelled against his father and tried to claim a part of the kingdom	c. 847 – 877 (aged 30) Captured and blinded; then fled to Louis the German's kingdom
	Louis II "the Stammerer" (Note: Not to be confused with Louis II the German, son of Louis the Pious and king of East Francia (Germany). Both French and German monarchs saw themselves as the successors of Charlemagne, which is why many rulers share the same regnal name.)	6 October 877 (Note: Louis II was crowned on 8 December 877.) – 10 April 879 (1 year, 6 months and 4 days)	Son of Charles the Bald	1 November 846 – 10 April 879 (aged 32) King of Aquitaine since 867. Died of natural causes.
	Louis III	10 April 879 (Note: Louis III and Carloman II were crowned on September 879.) – 5 August 882 (3 years, 3 months and 26 days)	Son of Louis the Stammerer	863 – 5 August 882 (Note: Scholars give his death as either 3, 4, or 10 August, but ancient sources clearly indicates 5 August.) (aged 19) Ruled the North; died after hitting his head with a lintel while riding his horse.
	Carloman II	10 April 879 (Note: Louis III and Carloman II were crowned on September 879.) – 6 December 884 (5 years, 7 months and 26 days)	Son of Louis the Stammerer	866 – 6 December 884 (Note: Some modern sources give his death as "12 December", but this is a mistake.) (aged 18) Ruled the South; died after being accidentally stabbed by his servant.
Non-contemporary	Boso; Bosso or Boson (rival king in Burgundy)	15 October 879 – 11 January 887 (disputed; 8 years) (Note: Disputed due to claiming to being the legitimate successor of Louis II, thus claiming the throne of West Francia)	First non-Carolingian pretender to the Western throne; elected by the nobles as successor to Louis the Stammerer	c. 841 – 11 January 887 (aged 46) Was accepted only in Lower Burgundy and Provence; died of natural causes
	Charles (III) "the Fat" (Note: Charles the Fat was initially king of East Francia (Germany) and Holy Roman Emperor. Given that he was the third emperor with that name, he is also known as Charles III. He must not to be confused with Charles the Simple, who is also enumerated as Charles III. This discrepancy originates from the regnal number adopted by Charles V, the first French king to assume one.)	12 December 884 (Note: Charles the Fat was most likely crowned on 20 May 885. He was already king of East Francia since 28 August 876. He was also crowned emperor on 12 February 881.) – 11 November 887 (Note: This is the most accepted and cited date, although it is not entirely confirmed.) (2 years, 11 months and 5 days)	Son of Louis II the German, king of East Francia, and grandson of Louis I	839 (Note: In older sources his birth was dated to 832, but nowadays 839 is the accepted date.) – 13 January 888 (aged 48–49) King of East Francia since 876; crowned Emperor in 881. Last ruler to control all Frankish territories. Deposed by the nobility, later dying of natural causes

=== Robertian dynasty (888–898) ===
Portrait / coin	Name	Reign	Succession	Life details
	Odo; Eudes or Odon	29 February 888 (Note: Odo was crowned on 29 February 888 and then again on 13 November.) – 3 January 898 (9 years, 10 months and 15 days)	Son of Robert the Strong; elected king by the French nobles following the deposition of Charles	c. 858 – 3 January 898 (Note: Odo's death is universally given as 1 January, as given by a late 13th century chronicle, but the earliest source on the matter, from the early 11th century, records his death as 3 January. Another source, from the 13th century, records his death as 2 January.) (aged approx. 40) Defended Paris from the Vikings; died of natural causes
–	Ranulf; Rannoux or Ranulph (rival king in Aquitaine)	888 – 890 (disputed; 2 years)	Briefly elected king of Aquitaine by the nobles in opposition to Odo	c. 850 – 5 August 890 (aged approx. 40) Supposedly poisonned while on a trip to Paris
	Guy; Guido or Wido (rival)	February (Note: Crowned anti-king in February 888 in Langres with the support of the counts of Vermandois and Flanders, as well as the bishops of Reims, Langres, and Senlis.) – November 888 (disputed; 10 months)	Crowned king at Langres in opposition to Odo	Also Emperor and King of Italy (889–894). Abandoned his claim after Odo's second coronation

=== Carolingian dynasty (898–922) ===
Portrait / coin	Name	Reign	Succession	Life details
	Charles III "the Simple"	3 January 898 (Note: Charles III was crowned on 28 January 893, in opposition to Odo. (Note: Unless otherwise noted, the coronation dates and locations are given in the entry references.)) – 29 June 922 (24 years, 5 months and 26 days)	Posthumous son of Louis II the Stammerer; proclaimed king in opposition to Odo in January 893	17 September 879 – 7 October 929 (aged 50) Deposed by Robert's followers; later captured by Herbert II, Count of Vermandois. Died in captivity

=== Robertian dynasty (922–923) ===
Portrait / coin	Name	Reign	Succession	Life details
Non-contemporary	Robert I	29 June 922 (Note: Robert I was crowned on 30 June 922.)– 15 June 923 (11 months and 17 days)	Son of Robert the Strong and younger brother of Odo	865 – 15 June 923 (aged 58) Killed at the Battle of Soissons against Charles III. Sole king to die in battle

=== Bosonid dynasty (923–936) ===
Portrait / coin	Name	Reign	Succession	Life details
	Rudolph; Rodolphe or Raoul	15 June 923 (Note: Rudolph was crowned on 13 July 923.)– 14 January 936 (12 years, 6 months and 30 days)	Son of Richard, Duke of Burgundy and son-in-law of Robert I	c. 890 – 14 January 936 (aged approx. 45) Duke of Burgundy since 921. Died of illness after a reign of constant civil war and viking raids. Lost Lotharingia (Lorraine) to Henry I of Germany

=== Carolingian dynasty (936–987) ===
Portrait / coin	Name	Reign	Succession	Life details
	Louis IV "from Overseas"	19 June 936 (Note: Louis IV was crowned on 19 June 936, following a brief interregnum after the death of Rudolph.) – 10 September 954 (18 years, 2 months and 22 days)	Only son of Charles the Simple, recalled to France by Hugh the Great after being exiled to England	921 – 10 September 954 (aged 33) Died after falling off his horse
Non-contemporary	Lothair; Lothaire	10 September 954 (Note: Lothair was crowned on 12 November 954.) – 2 March 986 (31 years, 5 months and 20 days)	Son of Louis IV	941 – 2 March 986 (aged 44) Died of natural causes
Non-contemporary	Charles (rival)	late 978 – 980 (Note: The exact date is uncertain, but he was crowned anti-king against his brother in late 978 by Dietrich I of Metz at the city of Laon.) (disputed; around 2 years)	Revolted against his brother with the help of the German king Otto the Great	c. 953 – after 992 (aged approx. 40) Abandoned his claim after being beaten by his brother and Hugh Capet
Non-contemporary	Louis V "the Do-Nothing"	2 March 986 (Note: Louis V was crowned on 8 June 979.) – 22 May 987 (1 year, 2 months and 20 days)	Son of Lothair	967 – 22 May 987 (Note: Some scholars give his death as 21 May, but contemporary sources give 22 May.) (aged 20) Last carolingian ruler in West Francia; Died in a hunting accident

== Capetian dynasty (987–1792) ==
The Capetian dynasty is named for Hugh Capet, a Robertian who served as Duke of the Franks and was elected King in 987. Except for the Bonaparte-led Empires, every monarch of France was a male-line descendant of him. The kingship passed through patrilineally from father to son until the 14th century, a period known as Direct Capetian rule. Afterwards, it passed to the House of Valois, a cadet branch that descended from Philip III. The Valois claim was disputed by Edward III, the Plantagenet king of England who claimed himself as the rightful king of France through his French mother Isabella. The two houses fought the Hundred Years' War over the issue, and with Henry VI of England being for a time partially recognized as King of France.

The Valois line died out in the late 16th century, during the French Wars of Religion, to be replaced by the distantly related House of Bourbon, which descended through the Direct Capetian Louis IX. The Bourbons ruled France until deposed in the French Revolution, though they were restored to the throne after the fall of Napoleon. The last Capetian to rule was Louis Philippe I, king of the July Monarchy (1830–1848), a member of the cadet House of Bourbon-Orléans.

=== House of Capet (987–1328) ===
The House of Capet are also commonly known as the "Direct Capetians".

Portrait	Name	Arms	Reign	Succession	Life details
	Hugh "Capet"; Hugues (Note: "Capet" (Latin: Cappetus) was not actually a name, but a nickname adopted by later historians. It probably derived from chappe, an ecclesiastical mantle wore at the Abbey of Saint Martin of Tours.)		1 June 987 (Note: Hugh was elected and crowned king on 1 June 987, in Noyon. He was crowned again on 3 July in Paris by the archbishop of Reims. The latter date is usually regarded as the "official" start of the Capetian dynasty.) – 24 October 996 (9 years, 4 months and 23 days)	Elected king by the French nobles. Son of Hugh the Great and grandson of Robert I (Note: Hugh was also descendant of Charlemagne's sons Louis the Pious and Pepin of Italy through his mother and paternal grandmother, respectively, and was also a nephew of Otto I, Holy Roman Emperor.)	c. 941 – 24 October 996 (aged c. 55) Duke of the Franks since 956. Died of natural causes.
Non-contemporary	Charles (rival; second reign)		987 – 991 (Note: Second corronation date unknown.) (disputed; around 3 years)	Revolted a second time as the last Carolingian pretender to the throne.	c. 953 – after 992 (aged approx. 40) Captured by Hugh Capet in 991 and imprisoned in Orléans where he seemingly died (Note: He was then buried in the Basilica of Saint Servatius in Maastricht)
	Robert II "the Pious"		24 October 996 (Note: Robert II was crowned on 30 December 987.) – 20 July 1031 (34 years, 8 months and 26 days)	Only son of Hugh Capet	c. 970 – 20 July 1031 (aged approx. 60) Married thrice, getting excommunicated by the Catholic Church. Incorporated the Duchy of Burgundy
	Hugh (Note: Sometimes called "Hugh the Great", but this appears to be out of confusion with his great-grandfather, Hugh the Great (or possibly with Hugh, Count of Vermandois).) (junior king) (Note: Because neither Hugh nor Philip were sole or senior king in their own lifetimes, they are not traditionally listed as kings of France and are not given ordinals.)		19 June 1017 – 17 September 1025 (under Robert II)	Son of Robert II	c. 1007 – 17 September 1025 (aged approx. 18) Seemingly died after falling of his horse while preparing a rebellion against his father
	Henry I Henri		20 July 1031 (Note: Henry I was crowned on 14 May 1027.) – 4 August 1060 (29 years and 15 days)	Son of Robert II	4 May 1008 – 4 August 1060 (aged 52) His reign was marked with internal struggle against feudal lords
	Philip I "the Amorous"; Philippe		4 August 1060 (Note: Philip I was crowned on 23 May 1059.) – 29 July 1108 (47 years, 11 months and 25 days)	Son of Henry I	1052 – 29 July 1108 (aged 56) Ruled under the regency of Anne of Kiev and Count Baldwin V until 1066
	Louis VI "the Fat"		29 July 1108 (Note: Louis VI was crowned on 3 August 1108.) – 1 August 1137 (29 years and 3 days)	Son of Philip I	1 December 1081 – 1 August 1137 (aged 55) His reign contributed to the centralization of royal power. First king to wage war against the English
Non-contemporary	Philippe (junior king)		14 April 1129 – 13 October 1131 (under Louis VI)	Son of Louis VI	29 August 1116 – 13 October 1131 (aged 15) Died after falling from his horse
	Louis VII "the Young"		1 August 1137 (Note: Louis VII was crowned as a child on 25 October 1131, and again on 25 December 1137 alongside Eleanor of Aquitaine.) – 18 September 1180 (43 years, 1 month and 17 days)	Son of Louis VI	1120 – 18 September 1180 (aged 60) Known for his rivalry with Henry II of England and his military campaigns during the Second Crusade
	Philip II "Augustus"; Philippe Auguste		18 September 1180 (Note: Philip II was crowned on 1 November 1179.)– 14 July 1223 (42 years, 9 months and 26 days)	Son of Louis VII	21 August 1165 – 14 July 1223 (aged 57) Regarded as one of the greatest French rulers. First monarch to style himself as "King of France"
	Louis VIII "the Lion"		14 July 1223 (Note: Louis VIII was crowned on 6 August 1223.)– 8 November 1226 (3 years, 3 months and 25 days)	Son of Philip II	5 September 1187 – 8 November 1226 (aged 39) Proclaimed king of England in 1216, after which he led an unsuccessful invasion
	Louis IX "the Saint"		8 November 1226 (Note: Louis IX was crowned on 29 November 1226.)– 25 August 1270 (43 years, 9 months and 17 days)	Son of Louis VIII	25 April 1214 – 25 August 1270 (aged 56) Ruled under the regency of Blanche of Castile until 1234. Died during the 8th Crusade; only king to be venerated by the Catholic Church
	Philip III "the Bold"; Philippe		25 August 1270 (Note: Philip III was crowned on 30 August 1271.)– 5 October 1285 (15 years, 1 month and 10 days)	Son of Louis IX	3 April 1245 – 5 October 1285 (aged 40) Greatly expanded French influence in Europe. Died of a fever
	Philip IV "the Fair"; Philippe		5 October 1285 (Note: Philip IV was crowned on 6 January 1286.) – 29 November 1314 (29 years, 1 month and 24 days)	Son of Philip III	1268 – 29 November 1314 (aged 46) King of Navarre (as Philip I) since 16 August 1284, following his marriage with Joan I. Remembered for his struggle with the Roman papacy and his consolidation of royal power, which helped to reduce the influence of feudal lords
	Louis X "the Quarreller"		29 November 1314 (Note: Louis X was crowned on 24 August 1315.)– 5 June 1316 (1 year, 6 months and 7 days)	Son of Philip IV	3 October 1289 – 5 June 1316 (aged 26) King of Navarre (as Louis I) since 2 April 1305. His short reign was marked by conflicts with the nobility
	John I "the Posthumous"; Jean		15–19 November 1316 (4 days)	Posthumous son of Louis X	King for the four days he lived; youngest and shortest undisputed monarch in French history (Note: He lived from 15 to 19 November according to the continuator of Guillaume de Nangis. The Chronique Parisienne Anonyme de 1316 à 1339 gives 13 and 18 November. Modern sources often give his lifespan as 15–20 November.)
	Philip V "the Tall"; Philippe		20 November 1316 (Note: Philip V was crowned on 9 January 1317. (Note: Humphreys, p. 16 gives 6 January, the same date of Philip IV's coronation. This is a confusion.))– 3 January 1322 (5 years, 1 month and 14 days)	Son of Philip IV, brother of Louis X and uncle of John I	1293/4 – 3 January 1322 (aged 28–29) King of Navarre as Philip II. Died without a male heir
	Charles IV "the Fair"		3 January 1322 (Note: Charles IV was crowned on 21 February 1322.)– 1 February 1328 (6 years and 29 days)	Son of Philip IV and younger brother of Louis X and Philip V	1294 – 1 February 1328 (aged 34) King of Navarre as Charles I. Died without a male heir, ending the direct line of Capetians

=== House of Valois (1328–1589) ===
The death of Charles IV started the Hundred Years' War between the House of Valois and the House of Plantagenet, whose claim was taken up by the cadet branch known as the House of Lancaster, over control of the French throne. The Valois claimed the right to the succession by male-only primogeniture through the ancient Salic Law, having the closest all-male line of descent from a recent French king. They were descended from the third son of Philip III, Charles, Count of Valois. The Plantagenets based their claim on being closer to a more recent French king, Edward III of England being a grandson of Philip IV through his mother, Isabella.

The two houses fought the Hundred Years War to enforce their claims. The Valois were ultimately successful, and French historiography counts their leaders as rightful kings. One Plantagenet, Henry VI of England, enjoyed de jure control of the French throne following the Treaty of Troyes, which formed the basis for continued English claims to the throne of France until 1801. The Valois line ruled France until the line became extinct in 1589, in the backdrop of the French Wars of Religion. As Navarre did not have a tradition of male-only primogeniture, the Navarrese monarchy became distinct from the French with Joan II, a daughter of Louis X.

Portrait	Name	Arms	Reign	Succession	Life details
	Philip VI "the Fortunate"; Philippe		1 April 1328 (Note: Philip VI was crowned on 29 May 1328.) – 22 August 1350 (22 years, 4 months and 21 days)	Son of Charles, Count of Valois, grandson of Philip III and cousin of Charles IV	1293 – 22 August 1350 (aged 57) His reign was dominated by the consequences of a succession dispute, which led to the Hundred Years' War.
	John II "the Good"; Jean		22 August 1350 (Note: John II was crowned on 26 September 1350.) – 8 April 1364 (13 years, 7 months and 17 days)	Son of Philip VI	April 1319 (Note: Sources give his birth date as 6, 16, 20 or 26 April.) – 8 April 1364 (aged 45) Captured by the English at the Battle of Poitiers (1356); forced to sign a series of humiliating treaties
	Charles V "the Wise"		8 April 1364 (Note: Charles V was crowned on 19 May 1364.)– 16 September 1380 (16 years, 5 months and 8 days)	Son of John II; named Dauphin on 16 July 1349	21 January 1337 – 16 September 1380 (aged 43) His reign was marked with internal struggle against feudal lords and renewed conflict against the English
	Charles VI "the Mad" "the Beloved"		16 Sept 1380 (Note: Charles VI was crowned on 4 November 1380.)– 21 October 1422 (42 years, 1 month and 5 days)	Son of Charles V	3 December 1368 – 21 October 1422 (aged 53) Ruled under the regency of his uncles until 1388. Suffered a long period of mental illness before dying of natural causes
	Henry (II) (claimant)		21 October 1422 (Note: Henry (II) was crowned on 16 December 1431, at Notre-Dame de Paris.)– 19 October 1453 (Note: This is the date in which the last English holdout was expelled by the French, with the exception of Calais.) (disputed; 31 years)	Maternal grandson of Charles VI, recognized as heir after the Treaty of Troyes of 21 May 1420	6 December 1421 – 21 May 1471 (aged 49) King of England since 1 September 1422. Ruled under several regencies until 1437
	Charles VII "the Victorious" "the Well-Served"		21 October 1422 (Note: Charles VII was crowned on 17 July 1429.) – 22 July 1461 (38 years, 9 months and 1 day)	Son of Charles VI and uncle of Henry VI, named Dauphin in April 1417	22 February 1403 – 22 July 1461 (aged 58) His reign saw the end of the Hundred Years' War
	Louis XI "the Prudent" "the Universal Spider"		22 July 1461 (Note: Louis XI was crowned on 15 August 1461.) – 30 August 1483 (22 years, 1 month and 8 days)	Son of Charles VII	3 July 1423 – 30 August 1483 (aged 60) His reign saw the strengthening and expansion of royal power. Nicknamed "the Universal Spider" for the numerous intrigues during his rule
	Charles VIII "the Affable"		30 August 1483 (Note: Charles VIII was crowned on 30 May 1484.) – 7 April 1498 (14 years, 7 months and 8 days)	Son of Louis XI	30 June 1470 – 7 April 1498 (aged 27) Ruled under the regency of his sister Anne until 1491. Started the long and unsuccessful Italian Wars. Died after hitting his head on a lintel

==== House of Valois-Orléans (1498–1515) ====
Portrait	Name	Arms	Reign	Succession	Life details
	Louis XII "Father of the People"		7 April 1498 (Note: Louis XII was crowned on 27 May 1498.) – 1 January 1515 (16 years, 8 months and 25 days)	Great-grandson of Charles V. Second cousin, and by first marriage son-in-law, of Louis XI	27 June 1462 – 1 January 1515 (aged 52) Briefly conquered the Kingdom of Naples and the Duchy of Milan

==== House of Valois-Angoulême (1515–1589) ====
Portrait	Name	Arms	Reign	Succession	Life details
	Francis I "the Father of Letters"; François		1 January 1515 (Note: Francis I was crowned on 25 January 1515.) – 31 March 1547 (32 years, 2 months and 30 days)	Great-great-grandson of Charles V. First cousin once removed, and by first marriage son-in-law, of Louis XII	12 September 1494 – 31 March 1547 (aged 52) Remembered as a Renaissance patron of the arts and scholarship. Died of a fever
	Henry II; Henri		31 March 1547 (Note: Henry II was crowned on 26 July 1547.) – 10 July 1559 (12 years, 3 months and 10 days)	Son of Francis I, named Dauphin in August 1536	31 March 1519 – 10 July 1559 (aged 40) His reign saw the end of the Italian Wars. Died after being accidentally stabbed in a Jousting tournament
	Francis II; François		10 July 1559 (Note: Francis II was crowned on 18 September 1559.) – 5 December 1560 (1 year, 4 months and 25 days)	Son of Henry II	20 January 1544 – 5 December 1560 (aged 16) King consort of Scotland since 24 April 1558. A weak and sick boy, he remained under the regency of the House of Guise until his premature death
	Charles IX		5 December 1560 (Note: Charles IX was crowned on 15 May 1561.) – 30 May 1574 (13 years, 5 months and 25 days)	Younger brother of Francis II	27 June 1550 – 30 May 1574 (aged 23) Ruled under the regency of his mother Catherine until 1563, but remained under her influence until his death. The Wars of Religion began under his reign (1562). Best remembered for the Massacre of Vassy
	Henry III; Henri		30 May 1574 (Note: Henry III was crowned on 13 February 1575.) – 2 August 1589 (15 years, 2 months and 3 days)	Younger brother of Francis II and Charles IX; also related to the Bohemian and Polish monarchies	19 September 1551 – 2 August 1589 (aged 37) Initially ruler of Poland–Lithuania. (Note: Henry III was elected on 15 May 1573. He was crowned on 21 February 1574, but was declared deposed a year later, on 12 May 1575.) He reigned through the devastating Wars of Religion, which eventually led to his own assassination

=== House of Bourbon (1589–1792) ===
The Valois line looked strong on the death of Henry II, who left four male heirs. His first son, Francis II, died in his minority. His second son, Charles IX, had no legitimate sons to inherit. Following the premature death of his fourth son Hercule François and the assassination of his third son, the childless Henry III, France was plunged into a succession crisis over which distant cousin of the king would inherit the throne. The best claimant, King Henry III of Navarre, was a Protestant, and thus unacceptable to much of the French nobility.

Ultimately, after winning numerous battles in defence of his claim, Henry converted to Catholicism and was crowned as King Henry IV, founding the House of Bourbon. This marked the second time the thrones of Navarre and France were united under one monarch, as different inheritance laws had caused them to become separated during the events of the Hundred Years Wars. The House of Bourbon was overthrown during the French Revolution and replaced by a short-lived republic.

Portrait	Name	Arms	Reign	Succession	Life details
	Charles X (claimant)		2 August 1589 – 9 May 1590 (disputed; 9 months and 7 days)	7x great-grandson of Louis IX. Proclaimed king by the Catholic League in opposition to Henry of Navarre	22 December 1523 – 9 May 1590 (aged 66) Imprisoned by Henry III on 23 December 1588; remained his entire "reign" in captivity. Died of natural causes
	Henry IV "the Great" "the Good King"; Henri		2 August 1589 (Note: Henry IV was crowned on 27 February 1594.) – 14 May 1610 (20 years, 9 months and 12 days)	10th-generation descendant of Louis IX; also nephew of Charles (X) and by first marriage son-in-law of Henry II. Proclaimed king on Henry III's deathbed	13 December 1553 – 14 May 1610 (aged 56) King of Lower Navarre (as Henry III) since 10 June 1572. Killed in Paris on 14 May 1610 by Catholic fanatic François Ravaillac.
	Louis XIII "the Just"		14 May 1610 (Note: Louis XIII was crowned on 17 October 1610.) – 14 May 1643 (33 years)	Son of Henry IV	27 September 1601 – 14 May 1643 (aged 41) Last King of Lower Navarre (as Louis II). (Note: Lower Navarre was integrated into France during his reign.) Died of natural causes.
	Louis XIV "the Great" "the Sun King"		14 May 1643 (Note: Louis XIV was crowned on 7 June 1654.) – 1 September 1715 (72 years, 3 months and 18 days)	Son of Louis XIII	5 September 1638 – 1 September 1715 (aged 76) Ruled under the regency of his mother Anne of Austria until 1651. Longest reigning sovereign monarch in history
	Louis XV "the Beloved"		1 September 1715 (Note: Louis XV was crowned on 25 October 1722.) – 10 May 1774 (58 years, 8 months and 9 days)	Great-grandson of Louis XIV	15 February 1710 – 10 May 1774 (aged 64) Ruled under the regency of Philippe II, Duke of Bourbon-Orléans, until 1723
	Louis XVI		10 May 1774 (Note: Louis XVI was crowned on 11 June 1775.) – 21 September 1792 (Note: Louis XVI's powers as king became obsolete following the March on Versailles on 5 October 1789, after which he became a hostage of the revolutionary forces.) (18 years, 4 months and 11 days)	Grandson of Louis XV	23 August 1754 – 21 January 1793 (aged 38) Forced to install a constitutional monarchy after 1789. Formally deposed following the proclamation of the First Republic, executed in public
	Louis XVII (claimant)		21 January 1793 – 8 June 1795 (2 years, 4 months and 18 days; disputed)	Son of Louis XVI; named Dauphin on 4 June 1789	27 March 1785 – 8 June 1795 (aged 10) Imprisoned by the revolutionary forces on 13 August 1792. Remained his entire "reign" in captivity

== 19th-century monarchs ==
Following the execution of Louis XVI in 1792, royalists continued to recognize his son – the young king Louis XVII – as ruler of France. Louis was under arrest by the government of the Revolution and died in captivity having never properly ruled, though as his father died two years prior to him, he is still considered a king in the numbering of French monarchs. The republican government went through several changes in form and constitution until Napoleon's Coup of 18 Brumaire, and the eventual ascension of the First Consul Napoleon Bonaparte as Emperor Napoleon I. Napoleon was overthrown twice following military defeats during the Napoleonic Wars.

Following the Napoleonic period followed three different royal governments, firstly the Bourbon Restoration, which was ruled successively by two younger brothers of Louis XVI, then the July Monarchy, ruled by Louis Philippe I, brought to power by the July Revolution, a distant cousin who claimed descent from Philippe I, Duke of Orléans, younger brother of Louis XIV, and then the Second French Empire, a Bonapartist restoration which came about after the French Revolution of 1848, which overthrew the July Monarchy and installed a brief republic for four years until the ascension of President Louis-Napoleon Bonaparte, as Emperor Napoleon III.

=== House of Bonaparte, First French Empire (1804–1814) ===
Portrait	Name	Arms	Reign	Succession	Life details
	Napoleon I		18 May 1804 (Note: Napoleon I was crowned on 2 December 1804.) – 2 April 1814 (Note: The Sénat proclaimed the deposition in absentia of Napoleon on 2 April, which was followed by the Corps législatif on 3 April. Napoleon wrote an act of abdication on 4 April renouncing the throne in favour of his son. However, this was not accepted by the Coalition, so he wrote an unconditional abdication on 6 April renouncing his rights and that of his family.) (9 years, 10 months and 15 days)	First Consul of the French Republic following the coup d'état of 19 November 1799; proclaimed himself Emperor of the French in 1804	15 August 1769 – 5 May 1821 (aged 51) Conquered most of Europe in a series of successful wars; remembered as one of the greatest military commanders in history. Deposed in absentia and forced to abdicate, then exiled to the island of Elba
	Napoleon II (claimant)		4 – 6 April 1814 (2 days; disputed)	Son of Napoleon I, only named emperor in Napoleon's will.	20 March 1811 – 22 July 1832 (aged 21) Unrecognized by the Coalition and the Senate.

=== House of Bourbon, First Restoration (1814–1815) ===
Portrait	Name	Arms	Reign	Succession	Life details
	Louis XVIII "the Desired"		3 May 1814 (Note: Louis XVIII decided not to have a coronation.) – 20 March 1815 (1st time; 10 months and 17 days)	Younger brother of Louis XVI; proclaimed king in June 1795. Had his dynasty restored to the throne with the help of other European royal houses, which had dethroned Napoleon	17 November 1755 – 16 September 1824 (aged 68) Fled France on 21 June 1791, during the Flight to Varennes, and again in March 1815, after the return of Napoleon

=== House of Bonaparte, Hundred Days (1815) ===
Portrait	Name	Arms	Reign	Succession	Life details
	Napoleon I		20 March – 22 June 1815 (94 days)	Restored as Emperor of the French by the French Army following his escape from the island of Elba	15 August 1769 – 5 May 1821 (aged 51) Abdicated in favour of his son following his defeat at the Battle of Waterloo. Exiled to the island of Saint Helena, where he later died of a stomach illness
	Napoleon II (claimant)		22 June – 7 July 1815 (15 days; disputed)	Son of Napoleon I; titular emperor after his father's abdication	20 March 1811 – 22 July 1832 (aged 21) Unrecognized by the Coalition; remained his entire "reign" hidden in Austria, with his mother Duchess Marie Louise.

=== House of Bourbon, Second Restoration (1815–1830) ===
Portrait	Name	Arms	Reign	Succession	Life details
	Louis XVIII "the Desired"		8 July 1815 – 16 September 1824 (9 years, 2 months and 8 days)	Younger brother of Louis XVI; restored to the throne.	17 November 1755 – 16 September 1824 (aged 68) Attempted to rule under a constitutional monarchy. Last French monarch to die while still reigning
	Charles X		16 September 1824 (Note: Charles X was crowned on 29 May 1825, an unsuccessful attempt to revive the old monarchical traditions.)– 2 August 1830 (5 years, 10 months and 17 days)	Younger brother of Louis XVI and Louis XVIII	9 October 1757 – 6 November 1836 (aged 79) Leader of the Ultra-royalists; attempted to return to the Ancien Régime. Abdicated in favour of his grandson Henry after the July Revolution.
	Louis XIX (claimant)		2 August 1830 (20 minutes; heavily disputed)	Son of Charles X	6 August 1775 – 3 June 1844 (aged 68) Allegedly king for 20 minutes; (Note: Although claimed as the shortest reigning monarch by the Guinness World Records, this claim appears to be unsustained. The exact circumstances of his "abdication" are unknown, as it was announced in a document signed by both Charles X and Louis, who is only called Dauphin. He is said to have been "king" between his father's signature and his own, as he (allegedly) initially refused to sign the document.) later legitimist pretender to the throne.
	Henry V (claimant)		2–9 August 1830 (7 days; disputed)	Grandson of Charles X	29 September 1820 – 24 August 1883 (aged 62) Later legitimist pretender to the throne. Died in exile several years later

=== House of Bourbon-Orléans, July Monarchy (1830–1848) ===
The Bourbon Restoration came to an end with the July Revolution of 1830, which deposed Charles X and replaced him with Louis Philippe I, a distant cousin with more liberal politics. Charles X's son Louis signed a document renouncing his own right to the throne only after a 20-minute argument with his father. Because he was never crowned he is disputed as a genuine king of France. Louis's nephew Henry was likewise considered by some to be Henry V, but the new regime did not recognise his claim and he never ruled.

Charles X named Louis Philippe as Lieutenant général du royaume, a regent to the young Henry V, and charged him to announce his desire to have his grandson succeed him to the Chamber of Deputies, the lower house of the French Parliament at the time, the French equivalent at the time of the UK House of Commons. Louis Philippe did not do this, in order to increase his own chances of succession. As a consequence, and because the French parliamentarians were aware of his liberal policies and of his popularity at the time with the French population, they proclaimed Louis Philippe as the new French king, displacing the senior branch of the House of Bourbon.

Portrait	Name	Arms	Reign	Succession	Life details
	Louis Philippe I "the Citizen King"		9 August 1830 (Note: Louis Philippe I decided not to have a coronation.)– 24 February 1848 (17 years, 6 months and 15 days)	Sixth-generation descendant of Louis XIII and distant cousin of Louis XVIII; proclaimed king by the Chamber of Deputies after the abdication of Charles X during the July Revolution	6 October 1773 – 26 August 1850 (aged 76) Styled as King of the French. Formally deposed following the proclamation of the Second Republic. Abdicated in favour of his grandson
	Louis Philippe II (claimant)		24–26 February 1848 (2 days; disputed)	Grandson of Louis-Philippe I	24 August 1838 – 8 September 1894 (aged 56) Chosen by Louis Philippe I to be his successor; the National Assembly refused to recognize him as king and proclaimed the Second Republic. Later Orléanist pretender to the throne.

=== House of Bonaparte, Second French Empire (1852–1870) ===
The French Second Republic lasted from 1848 to 1852, when its president, Charles-Louis-Napoléon Bonaparte, was declared Emperor of the French under the regnal name of Napoleon III. He would later be overthrown during the events of the Franco-Prussian War, becoming the last monarch to rule France.

Portrait	Name	Arms	Reign	Succession	Life details
	Napoleon III		2 December 1852 (Note: A coronation ceremony for Napoleon III was planned, but never executed.)– 4 September 1870 (17 years, 9 months and 2 days)	Nephew of Napoleon I; elected as President of the French Republic in 1848, made himself Emperor of the French after 1851 coup d'état	20 April 1808 – 9 January 1873 (aged 64) Captured by the German army on 2 September 1870; deposed in absentia following the proclamation of the Third Republic.

== Later pretenders ==
Various pretenders descended from the preceding monarchs have claimed to be the legitimate monarch of France, rejecting the claims of the president of France and of one another. These groups are:

- Legitimist claimants to the throne of France: Descendants of Louis XIV through the senior branch of the House of Bourbon, claiming precedence over the House of Bourbon-Orléans by virtue of primogeniture. In 1883, these were split into two factions as Henri V died without heirs, and his successor as head of the House of Bourbon was a Spanish Bourbon. Earlier, King Philip V of Spain (also of the House of Bourbon) had earlier renounced the throne of France for himself and his descendants in the Peace of Utrecht. One faction were the Unionists, who recognized the Orléanist claimant Philippe as the pretender to the throne of France and disqualifying the Spanish branch from succession; the other were the Blancs d'Espagne, who insisted that claimant to the throne would remain to be from the Spanish branch according to primogeniture, disregarding the Spanish renunciation.
- Orléanist claimants to the throne of France: Descendants of Louis-Phillippe, himself descended from a junior line of the Bourbon dynasty, rejecting all heads of state since 1848. They argue that King Louis Philippe acquired legitimacy via popular sovereignty when the representatives of the French people in the French Parliament recognized him as king, with the Bourbons having already been rejected and dethroned by the French people after two revolutions.
- Bonapartist claimants to the throne of France: Descendants of Napoleon I and his brothers, rejecting all heads of state 1815–48 and since 1870. They argue that the Imperial throne needs to return to the House of Bonaparte, as the monarchs of this house had been chosen directly by the people through referendums, giving them legitimacy to reign via popular sovereignty, and both the Bourbons and the Orléans were rejected and dethroned through revolutions and that the Bonapartes were only dethroned due to the interference of foreign enemies, with no popular revolution taking place to overthrow the Bonapartes and that the Third Republic was originally intended to be a provisional regime to return the throne to an Orléans or Bourbon (that never happened).
- English claimants to the throne of France: kings of England and later of Great Britain (renounced by Hanoverian King George III upon union with Ireland in 1800).
- Jacobite claimants to the throne of France: senior heirs-general of Edward III of England and thus his claim to the French throne, also claiming England, Scotland, and Ireland.

== See also ==
- Family tree of French monarchs
- Family tree of French monarchs (simplified)
- English claims to the French throne
- Fundamental laws of the Kingdom of France
- List of French royal consorts
- List of heirs to the French throne
- List of presidents of France
- Style of the French sovereign
- Succession to the French throne
- Coronation of the French monarch
