= Antenor of Provence =

Merovingian official in Provence

Antenor was the Patrician of Provence in the last years of the 7th and first years of the 8th century. He was independent of Arnulfing authority and the representative of the Merovingian sovereign in Provence at a time when Arnulfing power was eclipsing the royal.

Antenor's influence in Provence was based on his land-holding and on his control of ecclesiastical and secular appointments. He had a large section of followers, but also detractors and opponents both within and without his duchy. In Marseille, Antenor confiscated property from the abbey of Saint-Victor de Marseille and ordered the documents recording the abbey's claims to these lands to be burnt, thus demonstrating a common tactic of the age amongst statesmen: confiscation of ecclesiastic land to pay followers.

In 697, he was present at the court of Childebert III when that king refused to grant Drogo of Champagne the properties he desired in virtue of his wife's familial connections. His presence at such a court may have been related to his opposition to Pepin of Heristal and his family.

== Sources ==
- Geary, Patrick J. Before France and Germany. Oxford University Press: 1988.
