= Chilperic II =

King of the Franks from 715 to 721

- King of the Franks
- Chilperic's seal from a document dated c.714, inscribed: C us rex Francorum

King of the Franks
- Reign: 715–721
- Predecessor: Dagobert III
- Successor: Theuderic IV
- Born: 672
- Died: 13 February 721 (aged 48–49); Attigny, Ardennes
- Issue: Childeric III?
- Dynasty: Merovingian
- Father: Childeric II
- Mother: Bilichild

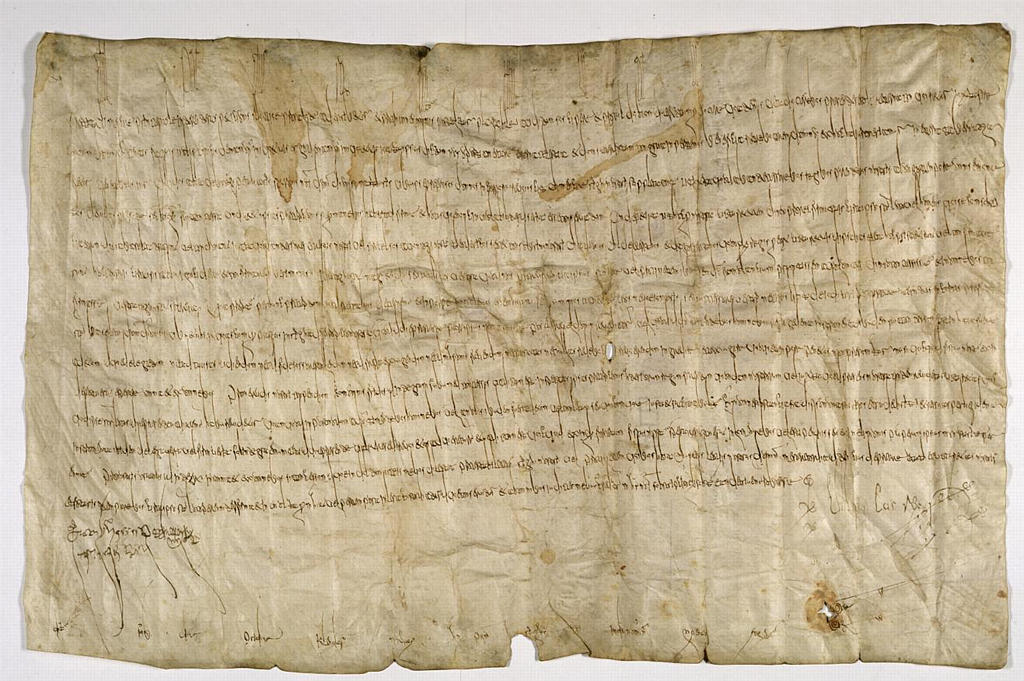
Confirmation of privileges of the Abbey of Saint-Denis issued by Chilperic II

Chilperic II or III (Note: This is in the cases where Chilperic of Aquitaine is counted as Chilperic II.) (c. 672 – 13 February 721) was King of the Franks from 715 until his death.

He was a son of Childeric II and his half-cousin wife, Bilichild, both of whom were assassinated, along with their eldest son Dagobert, in 675. Still an infant, Chilperic was spirited to a monastery to protect his life from the internecine feuding of his family. There, he was raised as Daniel until the death of Dagobert III in 715, when he was taken from the monastery – at the age of forty-three – and raised on the shield of the Neustrian warriors as king.

It appears he was supposed to be but a tool in the hands of Ragenfrid, mayor of the palace of Neustria, acclaimed in 714 in opposition to Theudoald, Pepin of Heristal's designated heir. Chilperic, however, was his own man: both a fighter and a leader, always at the forefront in battle at the head of his troops. In 716, he and Ragenfrid together led an army into Austrasia, then being warred over by Plectrude, on behalf of her grandson Theudoald, and Charles Martel, the son of Pepin of Heristal. The Neustrians allied with another invading force under Radbod, King of the Frisians, and met Charles in battle near Cologne, then held by Plectrude. Chilperic was victorious and Charles fled to the mountains of the Eifel. The king and his mayor then turned to besiege their other rival in the city. Plectrude acknowledged Chilperic as king, gave over the Austrasian treasury, and abandoned her grandson's claim to the mayoralty.

At this juncture, events took a turn against Chilperic. As he and Ragenfrid were leading their triumphant soldiers back to Neustria, Charles ambushed them near Malmedy and in the Battle of Amblève, Charles routed them and they fled. Thereafter, Charles Martel remained virtually undefeated and Chilperic's strong will was subdued in a series of campaigns waged in Neustrian territory.

In 717, Charles returned to Neustria with an army and confirmed his supremacy with a victory at Vincy, near Cambrai. He chased the fleeing king and mayor to Paris before turning back to deal with Plectrude and Cologne. On succeeding there, Charles Martel immediately proclaimed Chlothar IV king of Austrasia in opposition to Chilperic. In 718, Chilperic, in response, allied with Odo the Great, the Duke of Aquitaine, who had made himself independent during the contests in 715, but he was again defeated by Charles, at Soissons in 718. King Chilperic II fled with his ducal ally Odo to the land south of the Loire and his mayor Ragenfrid fled to Angers. Chlothar IV soon died suspiciously in 718. Duke Odo then handed over Chilperic II to Charles Martel and, in exchange for Charles recognising Chilperic's kingship over all the Franks, the king surrendered his political power to Charles, whom he recognized as Mayor over all the kingdoms (718).

In 719, Chilperic II was officially raised on the shield as King of all the Franks, but he survived but a year and his successors were mere rois fainéants. He died in Attigny and was buried in Noyon. Chilperic II may have been the father of Childeric III, but this remains uncertain.

== Sources ==
- Oman, Charles. The Dark Ages, 476–918. London: Rivingtons, 1914.
- Rosenwein, Barbara H. (2009). A Short History of the Middle Ages. University of Toronto.

Chilperic II Merovingian dynasty Born: 672 Died: 721
| Preceded by Dagobert III | King of the Franks; 715–721 opposed in Austrasia by Chlothar IV (717-718) | Succeeded by Theuderic IV |
