= Dagobert III =

King of the Franks from 711 to 715

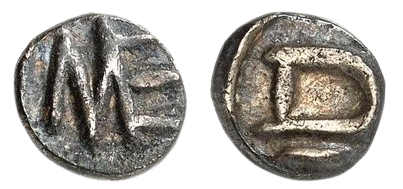
- The D could signify an immobilization by Dagobert II or Dagobert III, or Theuderic III. Or it could be a D for denier. Minted in Metz

King of the Franks
- Reign: 711–715
- Predecessor: Childebert III
- Successor: Chilperic II (Neustria); Chlothar IV (Austrasia)
- Mayor of the Palace: Pepin of Herstal
- Born: c. 699
- Died: 715 (aged 15–16)
- Issue: Theuderic IV
- Dynasty: Merovingian
- Father: Childebert III

Dagobert III (c. 699–715) was Merovingian king of the Franks (711–715).

He was a son of Childebert III. He succeeded his father as the head of the three Frankish kingdoms—Neustria and Austrasia, unified since Pippin's victory at Tertry in 687, and the Kingdom of Burgundy—in 711. Real power, however, still remained with the Mayor of the Palace, Pippin of Herstal, who died in 714. Pippin's death occasioned open conflict between his heirs and the Neustrian nobles who elected the mayors of the palace. As for Dagobert himself, the Liber Historiae Francorum reports he died of illness, but otherwise says nothing about his character or actions.

While attention was focused on combatting the Frisians in the north, areas of southern Gaul began to secede during Dagobert's brief time: Savaric, the fighting bishop of Auxerre, in 714 and 715 subjugated Orléans, Nevers, Avallon, and Tonnerre on his own account, and Eudo in Toulouse and Antenor in Provence were essentially independent magnates.

Dagobert III died of illness in 715. Chroniclers do not mention his burial place, though it may have been the Abbey of Saint-Étienne at Choisy-au-Bac, near Compiègne. If so, his tomb was likely destroyed by the Normans in 895.

The Vita Dagoberti, a late and unreliable biography of Dagobert II, partially conflates him with Dagobert I and Dagobert III.

== Children ==
His son, Theuderic IV or Theirry IV (sometimes, confusingly, referred to as Theodoric (Thierry) II), who was King of the Franks, died in 737.

== Sources ==
- Maréchal, Jean-Robert (2007). Les saints patrons protecteurs (in French). Cheminements.
- Kaschke, Sören (2021). "Fluid Historiography: The Annales Petaviani and the (Re)Writing of History in the Eighth Century". In Kooper, Erik S.; Levelt, Sjoerd (eds.). The Medieval Chronicle. Vol. 14. Brill. pp. 113–135. ISBN 978-90-04-47146-7.

Dagobert III Merovingian Dynasty Born: 699 Died: 715
| Preceded by Childebert III | King of the Franks; 711–715 | Succeeded by Chilperic II |
