= Theuderic IV =

King of the Franks from 721 to 737

- Anonymous denier supposedly issued by Charles Martel during Theuderic’s reign. Minted in Metz

King of the Franks
- Reign: 721–737
- Predecessor: Chilperic II
- Successor: Childeric III
- Mayor of the Palace: Charles Martel
- Born: c. 712
- Died: 737 (aged 24–25)
- Issue: Childeric III (?); Thierry IV (?)
- Dynasty: Merovingian
- Father: Dagobert III

Theuderic IV (c. 713 (Note: Georges Minois lists the year of birth under the heading "Date of birth (presumed)".) – 737, French, Thierry) was the Merovingian king of the Franks from 721 until his death in 737. He was the son of Dagobert III.

During his reign, his realm was controlled by the mayor of the palace, Charles Martel. The king mostly stayed at Chelles Abbey, then in Château-Thierry.

After his death, the Frankish throne remained vacant for seven years, until Carloman, one of Charles Martel's sons and successors, arranged for Childeric III, the last Merovingian king, to succeed him. Theuderic IV may have been the father of Childeric III, but this remains uncertain. It has also been suggested that Thierry IV of Toulouse was his son.

== Sources ==
- Minois, Georges (1989). History of Old Age: From Antiquity to the Renaissance. University of Chicago Press. ISBN 9780226530314.
- Rosenwein, Barbara H. (2009). A Short History of the Middle Ages. University of Toronto.

Preceded by Chlothar IV; Chilperic II	King of the Franks; 721–737	Succeeded by interregnum (until 741)
