= Childebert III =

King of the Franks from 694 to 711

Childebert III the Just
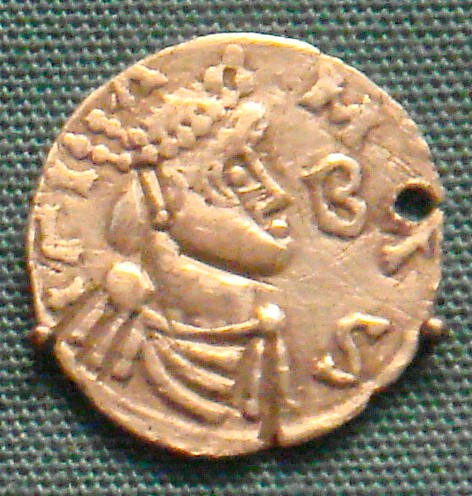
- A coin of Childebert III, now in the British Museum

King of the Franks
- Reign: 694–711
- Predecessor: Clovis IV
- Successor: Dagobert III
- Mayor of the Palace: Pepin of Herstal
- Born: c. 678/679
- Died: 23 April 711 (aged 32–33)
- Spouse: Ermenechildis
- Issue: Dagobert III; Chlothar IV (?)
- Dynasty: Merovingian
- Father: Theuderic III
- Mother: Clotilda

Childebert III (or IV), called the Just (French: le Juste) (c. 678/679 – 23 April 711), was the son of Theuderic III and Chrothildis (or Doda) and sole king of the Franks (694–711). He was seemingly but a puppet of the mayor of the palace, Pepin of Heristal, though his placita show him making judicial decisions of his own will, even against the Arnulfing clan. His nickname has no comprehensible justification except possibly as a result of these judgements, but the Liber Historiae Francorum calls him a "famous man" and "the glorious lord of good memory, Childebert, the just king."

He had a son named Dagobert, who succeeded him, as Dagobert III. His wife was Ermenechildis, also known as Edonne. It is possible, though not likely, that Chlothar IV was also his son. He spent almost his entire life in a royal villa on the Oise.

In 708, during his reign of sixteen years, the bishop of Avranches, Saint Aubert, founded the monastery of Mont-Saint-Michel supposedly at the urging of the Archangel Michael.

Upon his death on 23 April 711, southern Gaul began to grow independent: Burgundy under Bishop Savaric of Auxerre, Aquitaine under Duke Odo the Great, and Provence under Antenor. He died at St Etienne, Loire, France. He was buried in the church of St. Stephen at Clairoix, near Compiègne.

== Notes ==
Childebert III Merovingian Dynasty Born: 678/679 Died: 711
Preceded by Clovis IV	King of the Franks; 694–711	Succeeded by Dagobert III
