= Cwenburh =

8th-century saint

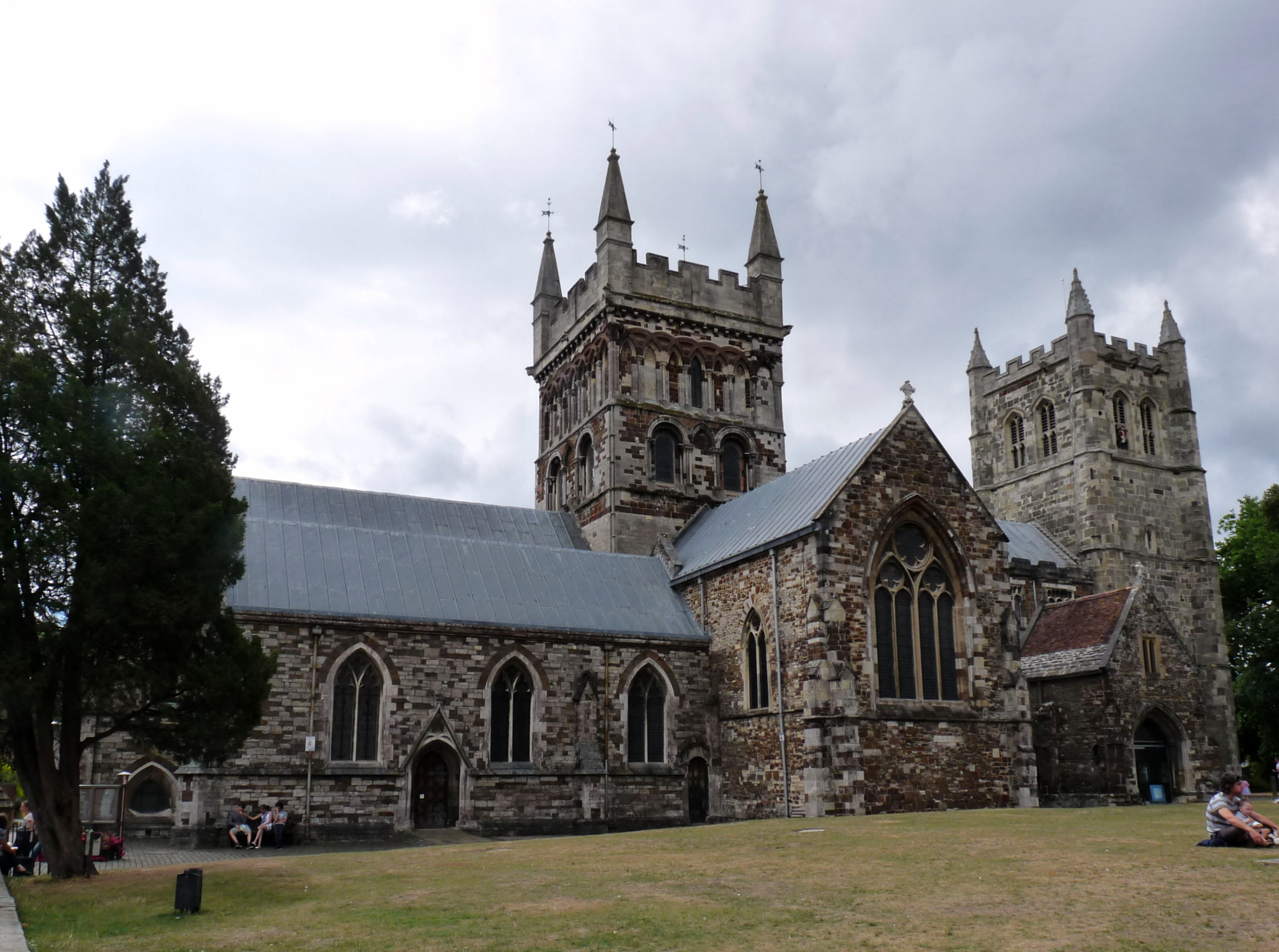
Her Abbey now Wimborne Minster

Cwenburh of Wimborne was an 8th-century Anglo-Saxon saint, a sister of King Ine of Wessex and of Saint Cuthburh. Her sister Cuthburh was married to King Aldfrith of Northumbria and then became the first abbess of Wimborne monastery.

Very little information survives about Cwenburh. She is known primarily from a mention in a single annal of the Anglo-Saxon Chronicle:

718. In this year Ingild Ine's brother died, and their sisters were Cwenburh and Cuthburh. And Cuthburh raised the monastery at Wimborne; and she was given to Aldfrith, king of the Northumbrians; but they separated during his life.

She is also included in the genealogical preface to the Chronicle in one copy, as part of a pedigree for the 9th-century King Æthelwulf of Wessex, the father of King Alfred the Great of Wessex.

... Eoppa [the son] of Ingild, and Ingild of Cenred, and Ine of Cenred, and Cuthburh of Cenred, and Cwenburh of Cenred, and Cenred of Ceolwald ...

It is possible that Cwenburh succeeded Cuthburh as abbess there after her sister's death. Cuthburh is later mentioned again in a list entitled On the Resting-Places of the Saints, found in two 11th-century manuscripts

resteth Saint Cuthburh at Wimborne Minster, that first established the life and customs that are still kept in the monastery.

In one version of the list the words "and Cwenburh" appear after Cuthburh. According to Felix Liebermann who made an edition of the text in the 19th century this appears to be a later addition, and the subsequent clause remains grammatically singular, referring only to Saint Cuthburh.

The Abbess Tetta is sometimes viewed as a familiar name for Cwenburh, or alternatively as a third sister.
