= Cenred of Wessex =

7th century Anglo-Saxon noble

Cenred of Wessex was a member of the House of Wessex and a member of the direct male line from Cynric to Egbert. It is possible that Cenred ruled alongside his son Ine for a period. There is limited evidence for joint kingships, and stronger evidence of subkings reigning under a dominant ruler in Wessex not long before his time. Ine acknowledged his father's help in his code of laws, and there is also a surviving land-grant that indicates Cenred was still reigning in Wessex after Ine's accession.

His father was Ceolwald of Wessex. Cenred had at least three other children.

- Ine, king of Wessex and married Æthelburg of Wessex
- Ingild, the great-grandfather of Ealhmund of Kent, and the great-great-grandfather of Egbert
- Cuthburh, who married Aldfrith of Northumbria, and became abbess of Wimborne
- Cwenburh, who may have succeeded her sister as abbess at Wimborne.

== See also ==
- House of Wessex family tree
