= Cuthburh =

Abbess of Wimborne Minster

Saint Cuthburh

Abbess, Queen
- Died: 31 August 725
- Venerated in: Catholic Church; Anglican Communion; Eastern Orthodox Church
- Major shrine: Wimborne Minster
- Feast: 31 August

Cuthburh
- Queen consort of Northumbria; Abbess of Wimborne Minster
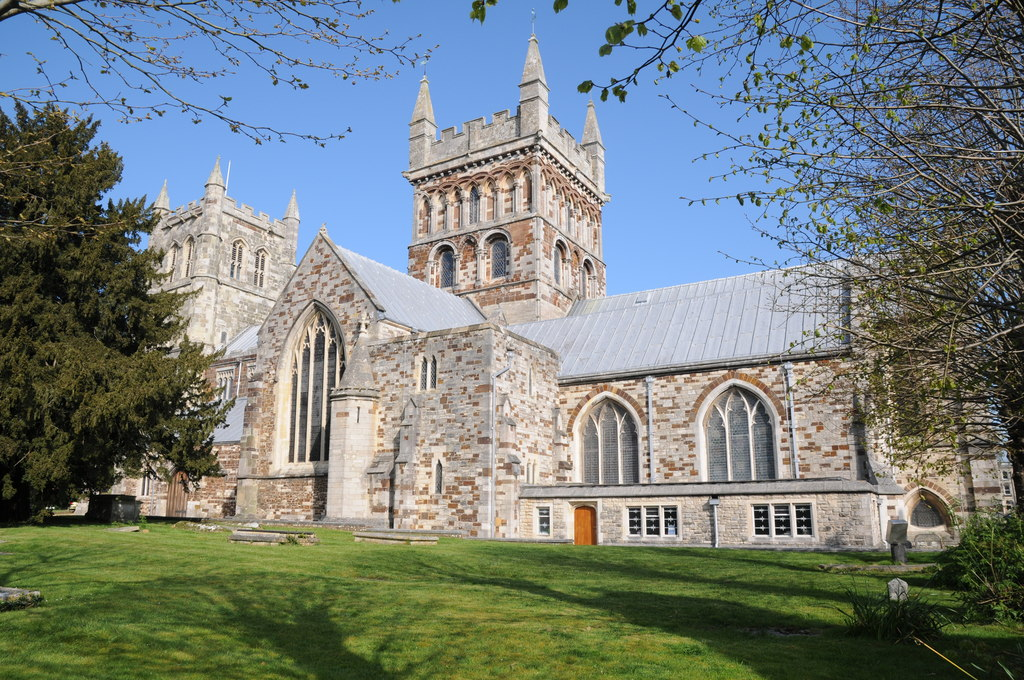
- Her Abbey, now Wimborne Minster
- Died: 31 August 725
- Spouse: Aldfrith of Northumbria
- Issue: Osred I of Northumbria
- House: House of Wessex (by birth)
- Father: Cenred of Wessex
- Religion: Christianity

Saint Cuthburh or Cuthburg, Cuthburga (Old English: Cūþburh; died 31 August 725) was the first Abbess of Wimborne Minster. She was the sister of Ine, King of Wessex and was married to the Northumbrian king Aldfrith.

== Life ==
Cuthburh was the daughter of Cenred of Wessex. She had two brothers, Ine and Ingeld, and a sister Cwenburh. Ingeld was an ancestor of Alfred the Great. Her marriage to Aldfrith allied him with Ine, one of the most powerful rulers in Anglo-Saxon England.

Cuthburh is the only recorded wife of Aldfrith. He had at least two sons, Osred and Offa. Cuthburh is generally considered the mother of Osred, although her maternity of Offa is uncertain. They are also thought to have had a daughter, Osana, later venerated as Saint Osana.

According to a report by Florence of Worcester, written long afterwards, at some time before Aldfrith's death in 705 he and Cuthburh "renounced connubial intercourse for the love of God". Following this, Cuthburh entered Abbess Hildelith's nunnery at Barking Abbey. Cuthburh is traditionally associated with the "Cuthburh" mentioned in the dedication of Aldhelm's treatise De virginitate. It is thought that she was in some way related to Aldhelm. After Aldfrith's death, around 705, Cuthburh and Cwenburh established a double-monastery in her brother's kingdom of Wessex, at Wimborne, Dorset.

She is described as austere, and she communicated with prelates through a little hatch in the nunnery at Wimborne. Among Saint Boniface's surviving letters is an anonymous account of a vision of Abbess Cuthburh in Hell.

Cuthburh died on 31 August 725 at Wimborne and is said to be buried under the wall of the chancel.

In 1538, Wimborne Minster being in need of repair, the guardians of the church wrote Thomas Cromwell for permission to melt down the silver reliquary containing Cuthburh's head. As a few years later, the tower collapsed, it is surmised that the reliquary was confiscated to the King's use. It is not mentioned what then happened to her head.

The feast day associated with her is 31 August.

== See also ==
- House of Wessex family tree

== Sources ==
- Farmer, D. H. (1987). The Oxford Dictionary of Saints, p. 96. Oxford: Clarendon Press.
- Lapidge, Michael; Blair, John; Keynes, Simon; Scragg, Donald, eds. (1999). "Cuthburg". The Blackwell Encyclopedia of Anglo-Saxon England. Oxford: Blackwell Publishing. p. 135. ISBN 0-631-22492-0.
- Mayo, C.H. (1860). History of Wimborne Minster: The Collegiate Church of Saint Cuthberga and King's Free Chapel at Wimborne, (pp. 4–6). London: Bell and Daldy. archive.org
