= Coenred of Northumbria =

Coenred

King of Northumbria
- Reign: 716–718
- Predecessor: Osred
- Successor: Osric
- Died: 718

Coenred (sometimes given as Cenred or Kenred) was king of Northumbria from 716 to 718.

== Life ==
He descended from Ida of Bernicia, and was the first of his branch of the family to rule Northumbria. John of Fordun claims that he and Osric murdered his predecessor Osred. Bede merely mentions that Osred was slain; the Anglo-Saxon Chronicle places it somewhere "on the southern border". William of Malmesbury calls him "a draught from the same cup" as Osred, which is to say a young man, vigorous, dissolute, cruel and bold.

Coenred claimed descent from Ida of Bernicia. In the Gesta Regum Anglorum, it is written by William of Malmesbury that his brother, Ceolwulf "was the son of Cutha, Cutha of Cuthwin, Cuthwin of Leoldwald, Leoldwald of Egwald, Egwald of Aldhelm, Aldhelm of Ocga, Ocga of Ida, Ida of Eoppa."

He was succeeded by Osric, brother, or half-brother, of Osred. Coenred's brother Ceolwulf became king after Osric.

Preceded by Osred	King of Northumbria; 716 to 718	Succeeded by Osric
