= Osric of Northumbria =

Osric

King of Northumbria
- Reign: 718–729
- Predecessor: Coenred
- Successor: Ceolwulf
- Died: 9 May 729
- Father: Aldfrith of Northumbria or Eahlfrith of Deira

Osric was king of Northumbria from the death of Coenred in 718 until his death on 9 May 729. Symeon of Durham calls him a son of Aldfrith of Northumbria, which would make him a brother, or perhaps a half-brother, of Osred. Alternatively, he may have been a son of King Eahlfrith of Deira, and thus a first cousin of Osred.

Bede reports little of Osric's reign, but records that comets were seen at his death, a sign of ill omen. William of Malmesbury praises Osric for his decision to adopt Ceolwulf, brother of Coenred, as his heir.

Preceded by Coenred	King of Northumbria	Succeeded by Ceolwulf
