= Eadwulf I =

Eadwulf I may refer to:

- Eadwulf I of Northumbria (d. 717)
- Eadwulf I of Bamburgh (d. 913)
