= Fíne =

Fíne is a Gaelic-Irish feminine given name.

At least two women named Fín or Fíne are attested in the Irish annals:

- Fín, princess of Cenél nEógain, wife of Oswiu of Northumbria (d. 670).
- Fíne, abatissa or banabb of Kildare.
