= Osana =

Northumbrian princess and saint

Saint Osana
- Born: Deira, Northumbria
- Died: Howden, Yorkshire
- Venerated in: Catholic Church
- Feast: 18 June

Osana was a Northumbrian princess, whose local following as a saint developed informally after her death, though she was never officially canonised. Centuries after her death, she was described by the Norman-Welsh chronicler Giraldus Cambrensis (died 1223) as the sister of King Osred I of Northumbria, which would make her the daughter of King Aldfrith of Northumbria. Osana was depicted by Giraldus as inflicting a miraculous flagellation from her grave in Howden, Yorkshire, upon a concubine of the priest of the collegiate church there, a moral tale intended to inculcate clerical celibacy. Celibacy of the Anglo-Saxon clergy was not expected in Osana's time; when it began to be enforced from the top at even the higher levels, with Archbishop Anselm's council of London, 1102, it continued to be resisted in Britain, though it was a central objective of Gregorian reform.

Giraldus records

"In the north of England beyond the Humber, in the church of Hovedene, the concubine of the rector incautiously sat down on the tomb of St. Osana, sister of king Osred, which projected like a wooden seat; on wishing to retire, she could not be removed, until the people came to her assistance; her clothes were rent, her body was laid bare, and severely afflicted with many strokes of discipline, even till the blood flowed; nor did she regain her liberty, until by many tears and sincere repentance she had showed evident signs of compunction."

There had been no previous record of Osana. On the authority of Giraldus Cambrensis, the Bollandists named 18 June a feast for Osana.
