= Beornhæth =

Beornhæth was an Anglo-Saxon nobleman in Northumbria in the reign of King Ecgfrith (ruled 671–685). He was the first of his family to come to notice.

Eddius's Life of Saint Wilfrid, recounting Ecgfrith's campaign against the Picts in 671 or 672, states that he was accompanied by the "sub-king" Beornhæth. It is presumed that Beornhæth ruled a part of northern Bernicia, perhaps in modern Lothian where there was a major Northumbrian fortress at Dunbar.

Beornhæth's son Berhtred (died c. 698), also called Berht, commanded King Ecgfrith's punitive expedition to kingdom of Brega, in Ireland, in 684. Beorhtred's paternity is known from the notice of his death in the Irish annals, where he is called the son of Beornhæth.

Historians presume that Berhtfrith, "a nobleman second in rank only to [King Osred]", was a son of Berhtred. Berhtfrith was largely responsible for the defeat of the would-be King Eadwulf, and the installation of Aldfrith's son Osred on the throne as child-king in 705. Berhtfrith appears to have achieved this by making peace between Osred's supporters, and those of Bishop Wilfrid.
