= Fín =

7th-century Irish princess

Fín was an Irish Princess, who lived during the 7th century. She was a daughter or granddaughter of Colmán Rímid (died 604 CE) of Cenél nEógain.

She formed some sort of marriage with Oswiu of Northumbria (c. 612 – 15 February 670 CE), by whom she had Aldfrith (died 14 December 704/705 CE).

== Family tree ==
    Báetán mac Muirchertaig
    | 
    |___________________________________________________________
    |                   |           |            |             |
    |                   |           |            |             |
    Colmán Rímid        Máel Umai   Forannán     Fergus        Ailill.
    |                               |            |             |
    |                               |            |             |_____________________________
    ?                         Hui Forannáin   Cenél Forgusa    |                          |
    |                                                          |                          |
    |                                                          Cenn Fáelad mac Aillila    Sabina
    Fín   =    Oswiu of Northumbria                                                 |
                |                                                                         |
                |                                                                         Cuthbert of Lindisfarne
                Aldfrith
                |
                |__________________________________________
                |                         |      |        |
                |                         |      |        |
                Osred I of Northumbria    Offa   Osric?   Osana?
