= Eadwulf I of Northumbria =

Eadwulf I

King of Northumbria
- Reign: 704–705
- Predecessor: Aldfirth
- Successor: Osred
- Died: 717

Eadwulf I (died AD 717) was king of Northumbria from the death of Aldfrith in December 704 until February or March of 705, when Aldfrith's son Osred was restored to the throne.

Osred was a child when his father died, and it is assumed that Eadwulf I usurped the throne. Eadwulf's relationship, if any, to the ruling dynasty, descendants of Ida, is not known, but it is quite possible that he was indeed of royal descent as two or more other branches of the Eoppingas are found as kings of Northumbria after the extinction of the main line.

Initially Eadwulf I appears to have had the support of ealdorman Berhtfrith son of Berhtred, presumed to be the lord of the north-east frontier of Bernicia, in Lothian and along the Forth. However, a crisis soon arose. Bishop Wilfrid, exiled by Aldfrith, wished to return to Northumbria. Eadwulf I aimed to keep the bishop in exile, but Berhtfirth appears to have supported Wilfrid's return. A short civil war, ending with a siege of Bamburgh, was won by Berhtfrith, Wilfrid and the supporters of Osred, and Osred was restored as child-king of Northumbria.

Eadwulf I appears to have been exiled to either Dál Riata or Pictland as his death is reported by the Annals of Ulster in 717. His son Earnwine was killed on the orders of Eadberht of Northumbria in 740. Eadwulf I great-grandson Eardwulf and Eardwulf's son Eanred were later kings of Northumbria.

| Preceded by Aldfrith | King of Northumbria; 704–705 | Succeeded by Osred |
