= Wimborne Minster (church) =

Church in Dorset, England

Coordinates: 50°47′56″N 1°59′17″W

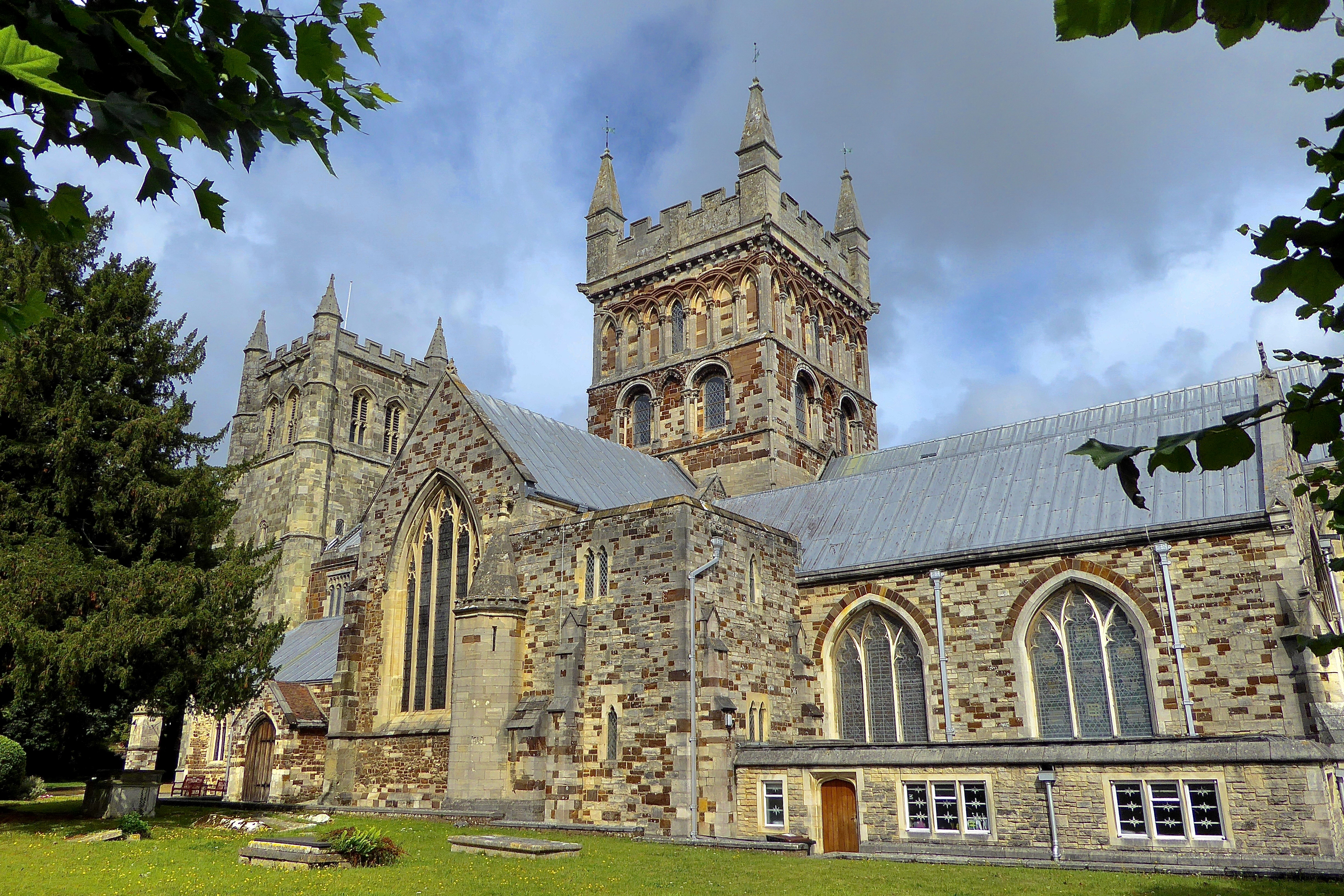
- Wimborne Minster
- Country: England
- Denomination: Church of England
- Website: wimborneminster.org.uk

History
- Dedication: Saint Cuthburga

Administration
- Province: Canterbury
- Diocese: Salisbury
- Parish: Wimborne Minster

Clergy
- Rector: Andrew Rowland

Listed Building – Grade I
- Official name: The Minster Church of St Cuthburga
- Designated: 14 June 1952
- Reference no.: 1119581

Wimborne Minster is the parish church of Wimborne, Dorset, England. The minster has existed for over 1300 years and is recognised for its unusual chained library (one of only a few surviving chained libraries in the world). The minster is a former monastery and Benedictine nunnery, and King Æthelred of Wessex is buried there.

== History ==
=== Wimborne Abbey ===
The minster is dedicated to Saint Cuthburga (sister to King Ine of Wessex and wife of King Aldfrith of Northumbria) who founded a Benedictine abbey of nuns at the present day minster c. 705. Saint Walpurga was educated in the monastery, where she spent 26 years before travelling to Germany, following the missionary call of her mother's brother Saint Boniface. Leoba was also educated in this place. A monastery for men was also built around this time, adjacent to the abbey. Over the next hundred years the abbey and monastery grew in size and importance. The Anglo-Saxon name of the abbey, monastery and town was Winburna.

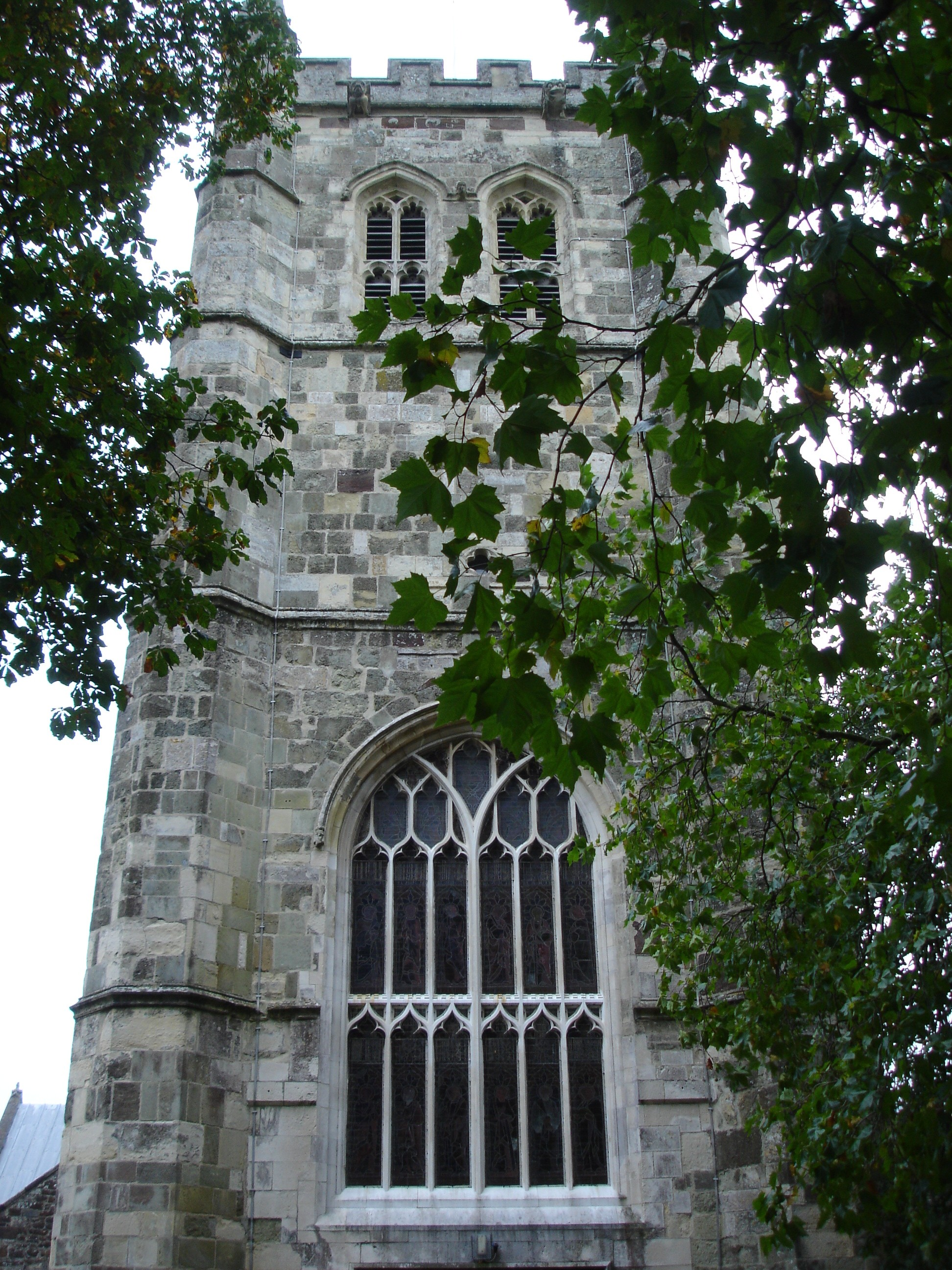
The West Tower

In 871 King Æthelred I of Wessex, elder brother of Alfred the Great, was buried in the minster. Alfred was succeeded by his son Edward the Elder in 899, and Æthelred's son, Æthelwold, rebelled and attempted to claim the throne. He seized a nun, probably of Wimborne, and made a stand there, probably because of its symbolic importance as his father's burial place, but he was unable to gain enough support to fight Edward and fled to the Vikings of Northumbria.

=== Collegiate church ===
The women's monastery was destroyed by the Danes in 1013 during one of their incursions into Wessex and never rebuilt, though the main abbey building survived. In 1043 Edward the Confessor founded a college of secular (non-monastic) canons, consisting of a dean, four prebends, four vicars, four deacons, and five singers at the minster. The minster was remodelled and rebuilt by the Normans between 1120 and 1180, to support that institution.

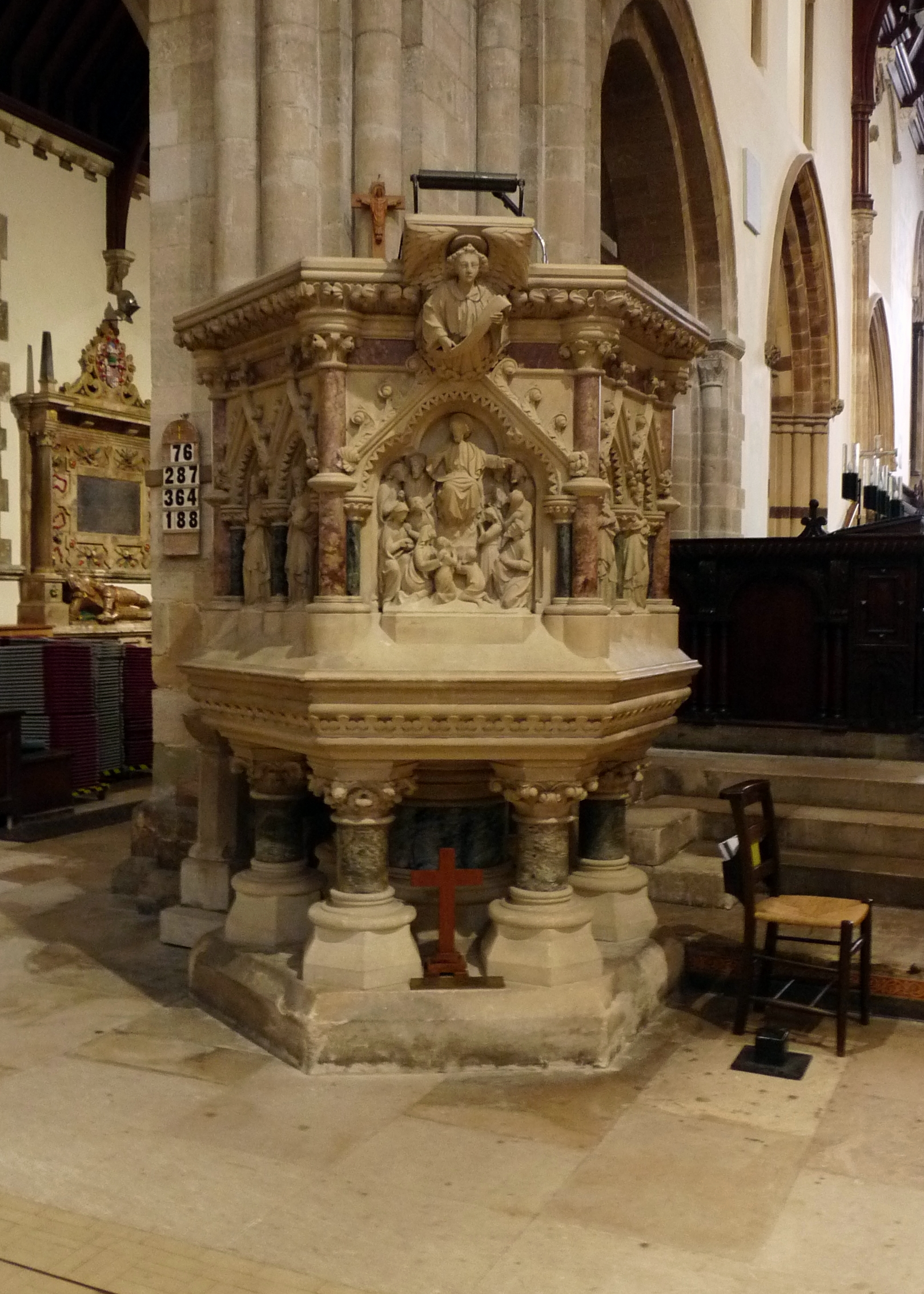
The pulpit

In 1318 Edward II issued a document that made the minster a royal peculiar which exempted it from all diocesan jurisdiction. The choir used to wear scarlet robes, a legacy of this peculiar. Similar robes of this type are worn in Westminster Abbey and St George's Chapel at Windsor Castle. In 1496 Lady Margaret Beaufort, great-granddaughter of John of Gaunt and mother of Henry VII, founded a small chapel in the minster. With the reign of Henry VIII the remaining parts of the monastery were adopted into part of the minster to avoid being destroyed. However much of the wealth of the minster was confiscated by Henry.

In 1562 a grant was obtained from Queen Elizabeth I by which part of the property formerly belonging to the college, together with all ecclesiastical rights and prerogatives was returned to Wimborne and vested in twelve governors. The charter was surrendered to James I and a new charter was obtained from Charles I at a cost of £1,000 with the addition of an organist and singing men. During the Civil War, when Charles I was beheaded, his coat of arms was painted out from the wall of the minster, but on the restoration of Charles II the arms were speedily replaced and have now been restored.

In 1846 the royal peculiar was abolished, and now all that remains of the old order is the control by 12 governors of some of the minster affairs. The church was renovated towards the end of the 19th century and its last addition, a vestry was added at the same time. Today the church is a place of visit and worship for the local community and visitors.

=== Deans of Wimborne ===
- Martin de Pateshull 1223
- Randolf Brito 1229
- John Mansell 1247
- John Kirby 1265
- John de Berwick 1286
- Stephen de Malo Lacu or Mauley 1312
- Richard de Clare 1317
- Richard de Swynnerton 1335
- Richard de Murymouth 1338
- Robert de Kyngeston 1342
- Thomas de Clopton 1349
- Reginald Brian 1349
- Thomas de Brembre 1350
- Henry de Bukyngham 1361
- Richard de Beverley 1367
- John Carp 1387
- Roger Coryngham 1400
- Peter de Altobasso or Altobosco 1412
- Walter Medford c. 1415
- Gilbert Kymer 1423
- Walter Hurte c. 1467
- Hugh Oldham 1485
- Thomas Ruthall c. 1508
- Henry Hornby c. 1509
- Reginald Pole 1518
- Nicholas Wilson 1537

== Architecture ==
The central tower and nave were founded in Saxon times, but the surviving building is predominantly Norman in design and construction, with Gothic components from various periods. One of its more famous architectural features include a working astronomical clock, which rings every hour and is represented in the form of a colourful quarterjack. The minster is built in a combination of Dorset limestone and New Forest stone.

The central length of the minster is 198 feet (60 m). The width, except the transepts, varies from 23 feet (7.0 m) in the nave to 21 feet (6.4 m) in the choir. The western tower of the minster is 95 feet (29 m) high. The smaller tower of the minster, above the transepts, is 84 feet (26 m). The 13th-century spire which once topped this tower fell down in a storm around 1600.

It is a Grade I listed building.

== The chained library ==
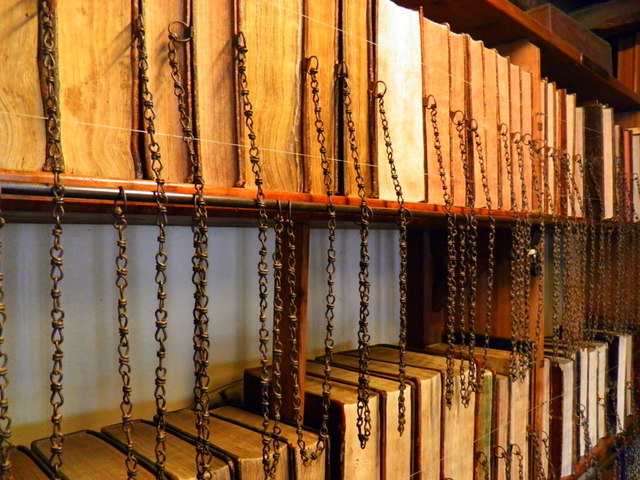
Books in the chained library

Until it was confiscated during Henry VIII's reign, the old Treasury held the wealth of the minster and numerous artefacts such as (reputed to be) a piece of the true cross, wood from the Manger and cloth from the Shroud. Since 1686 it has housed an important chained library. The chained library was one of the first public libraries in the UK, and it remains the second-largest. Some of the collections of the library include a manuscript written on lambskin in 1343, a book bound for the Court of Henry VIII, an incunabulum printed in 1495 on the works of Saint Anselm, and a Paraphrase of Erasmus printed in 1522 with a title page designed by Holbein.

The library is run by volunteers and remains open to the public on week days 10.30-12.30 & 2-4 (closed in winter season).

== The bells ==
Since 1911 the west tower at the minster has been home to a ring of ten bells. The original tenor bell was housed in the central tower and was cast in 1385. The central tower was considered too structurally weak to add much more additional weight, so in 1464 the west tower was constructed in order to house five bells. In 1629 the tenor bell was recast. Besides the tenor, the minster at this time was home to the 'Bell of St. Cuthburga', 'The Fyfer Bell', 'The Jesus Bell' and 'The Morrow Mass Bell'; presumably all housed in the west tower. In 2012, the bells were augmented to 12 by Whitechapel Bell Foundry, with an additional semitone bell cast to make a total of 13 bells.

== The organ ==
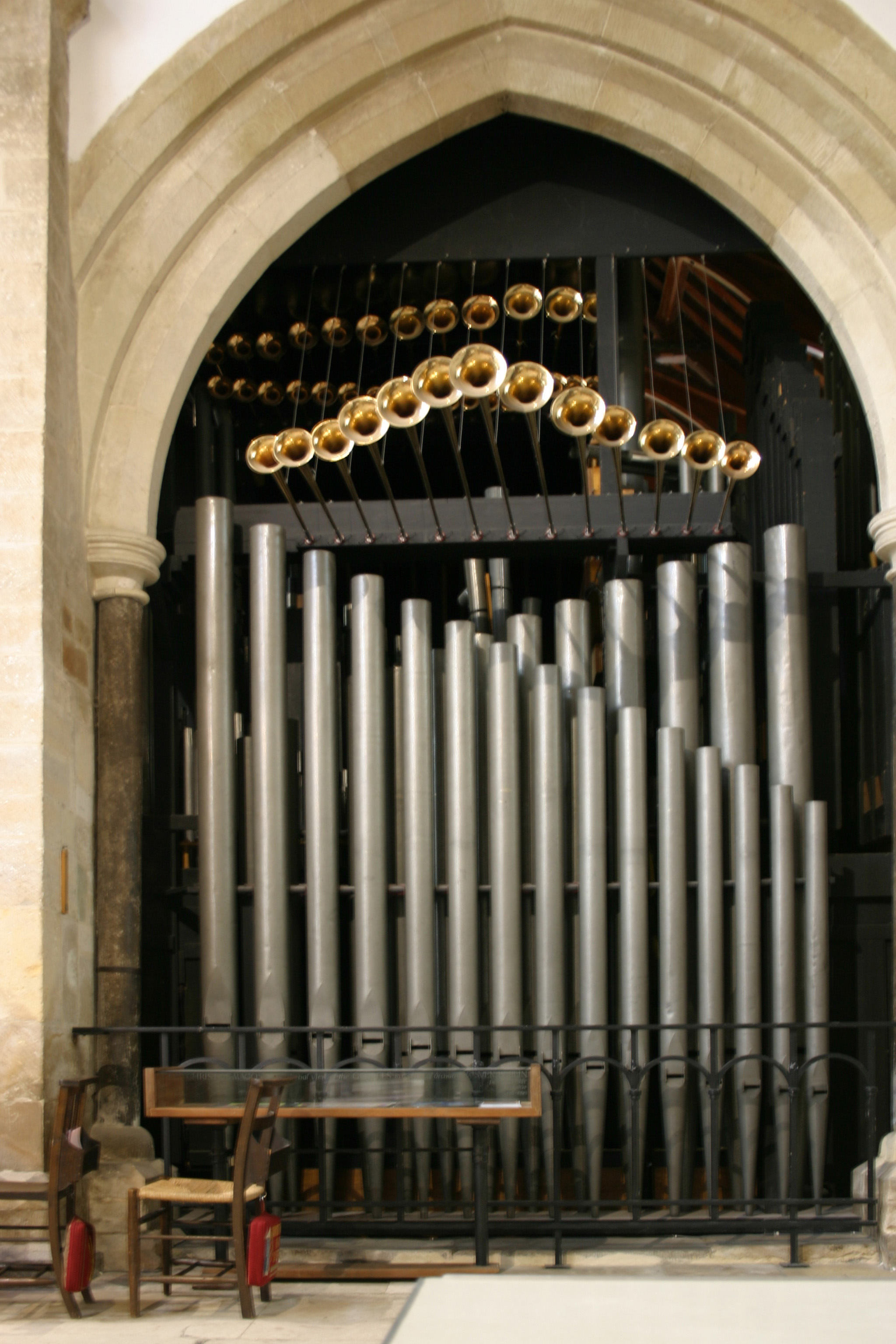
The organ in 2004

The organ was originally built in 1664 by Robert Hayward, of Bath. There are a number of ranks of pipes, still functioning in the present instrument, which date from this time. Originally, the organ stood upon a screen which separated the nave from the choir. However, in 1856 the organist at that time (Mr. F. Blount) removed the instrument and resited it in the south choir aisle. J. W. Walker & Sons rebuilt and enlarged the organ in 1866 and carried out further work in 1899, when a new case to house the Choir Organ was provided. This was designed by Walter J. Fletcher. In 1965, a major rebuilding and re-designing of the instrument took place, the work again being undertaken by J. W. Walker & Sons. The organ started being rebuilt by Mander Organ Builders in 2021 with a possible completion date of early 2022. The project will see the instrument reorganised, with two new cases, a revised winding system and a new 32' pedal Sub Bass.

=== The organists ===
- 1537 John Clifford
- 1590 Robert Durman
- 1596 Arthur Maynard
- 1600 Thomas Noble
- 1610 William Eames
- 1622 Thomas Noble
- 1627 Thomas Cottrell
- 1664 John Silver
- 1695 George Day
- 1713 John Fyler
- 1743 George Combes
- 1765 Richard Combes
- 1798 William Mitchell
- 1808 John Wright Blount
- 1835 Frederick Stanley Blount
- 1863 J. Whitehead Smith
- 1897 J. E. Tidnam
- 1902 Albert Edward Wilshire
- 1915 G.E.C. Eyers
- 1945 Norman Charlton-Burdon
- 1954 Graham Sudbury
- 1959 David S. Blott
- 1967 Michael Austin
- 1971 Barry Ferguson
- 1977 Christopher Dowie
- 2005 David Gostick (Director of Music)
- 2019 Colin Davey

=== Assistant organists ===
- 1943 Ronald Gomer
- 1965 John Slater
- Graham Davies
- 1974 Michael James
- 1981 Roger Overend and Michael Pain
- 1982 Simon Morley
- 1986 Alex Ditchmont
- 1987 Jonathan Melling
- 1988 Sean Tucker
- Ed Dowie
- 1997-2018 Sean Tucker (organist)

== The clock ==
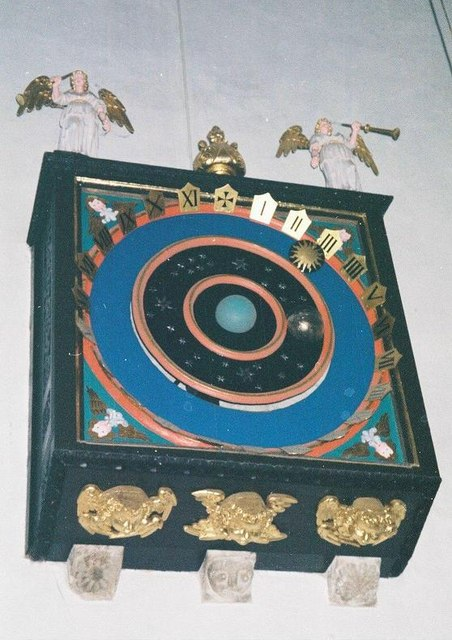
The astronomical clock

Wimborne Minster is the home of Wimborne Minster Astronomical Clock, one of a group of famous 14th to 16th century astronomical clocks to be found in the west of England. (See also Salisbury, Wells, Exeter, and Ottery St Mary.)

The clock's case was built in the Elizabethan era, but the face and dial are of a much greater age; the first documents relating to the clock concern repairs carried out in 1409. The face utilizes a pre-Copernican display, with a centrally placed earth orbited by the sun and stars.

It is currently maintained by Wimborne resident Bruce Jensen.

== Tombs ==
The most important tomb in the church is that of King Ethelred, the brother of Alfred the Great. Ethelred was mortally wounded in a battle at Martin, near Cranborne. The exact location of the tomb however is unknown, though sources and legend indicate that it resides somewhere near the altar. A 14th-century metal brass memorial next to the altar states that the former king is buried in the wall and is the only brass to mark the burial site of an English monarch. Two other important tombs, constructed out of alabaster and Purbeck Marble, are those of the legitimised great grandson of Edward III, John Beaufort, 1st Duke of Somerset and his wife, Duchess Margaret Beauchamp. They were the parents of Margaret Beaufort, the mother of Henry VII and are therefore his maternal grandparents.

== Other burials ==
- Cuthburh
- Gertrude Courtenay, Marchioness of Exeter
- Montague Druitt

== Gallery ==
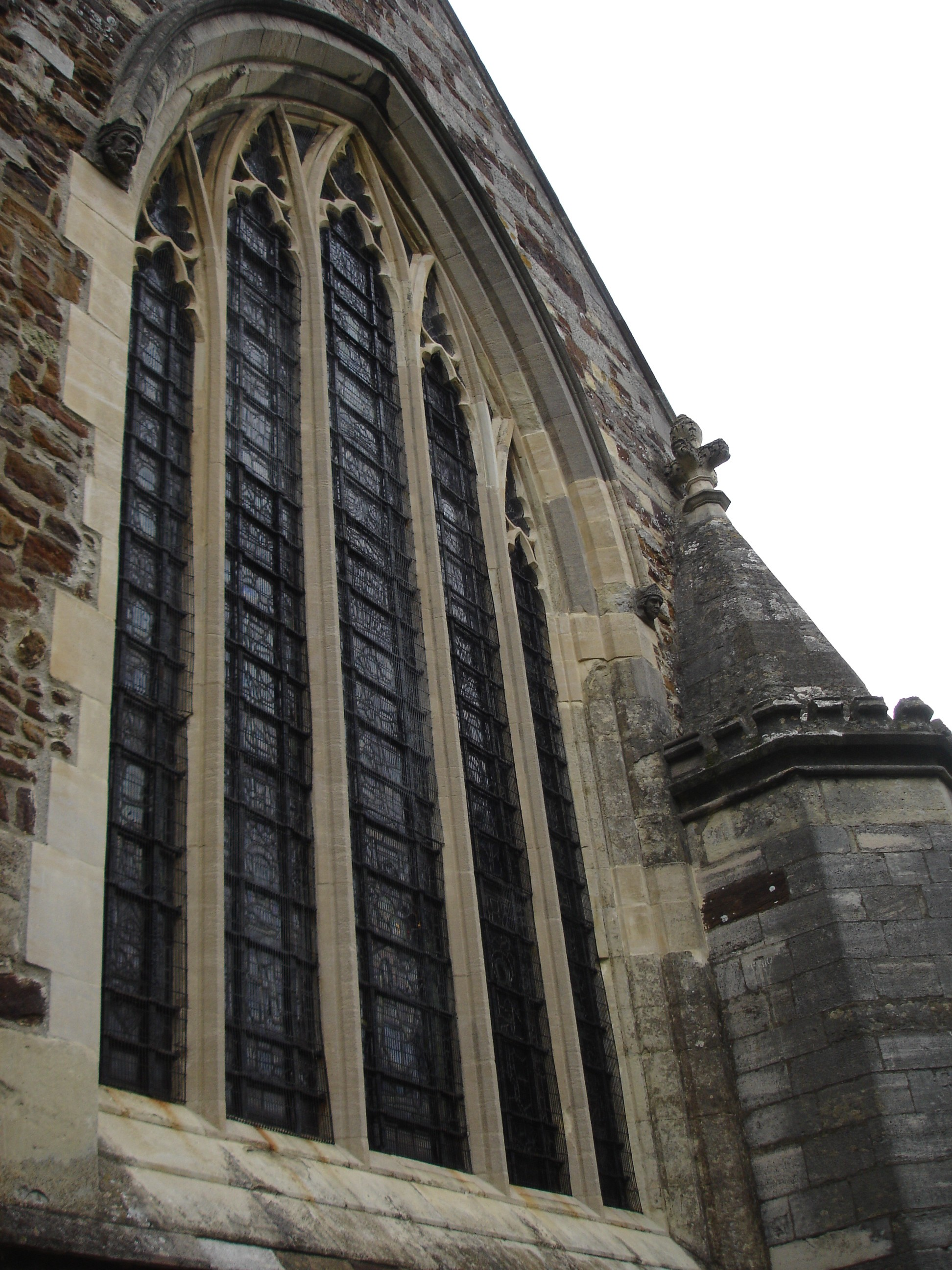
The south window of the minster

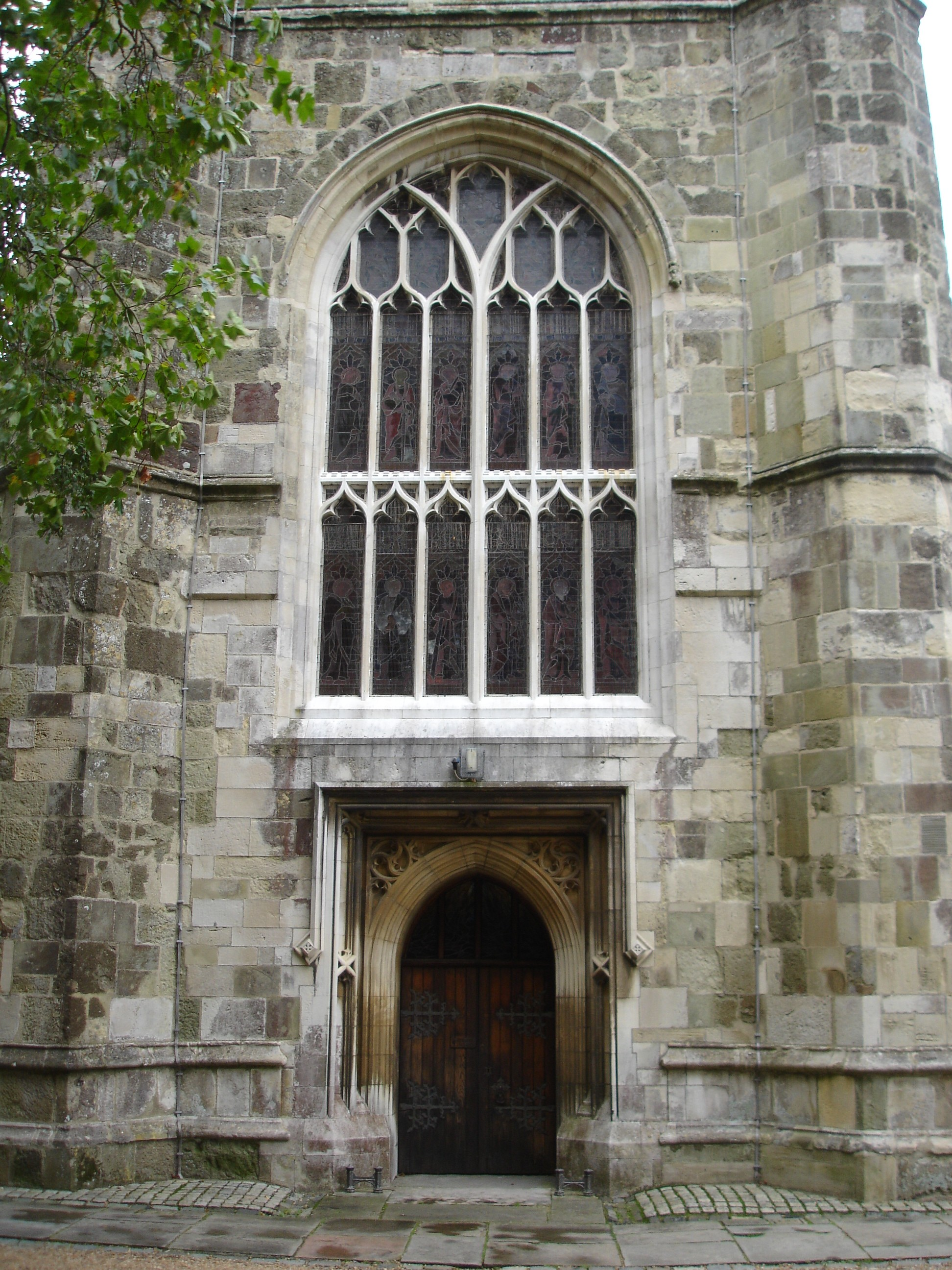
The baptistry door of the minster

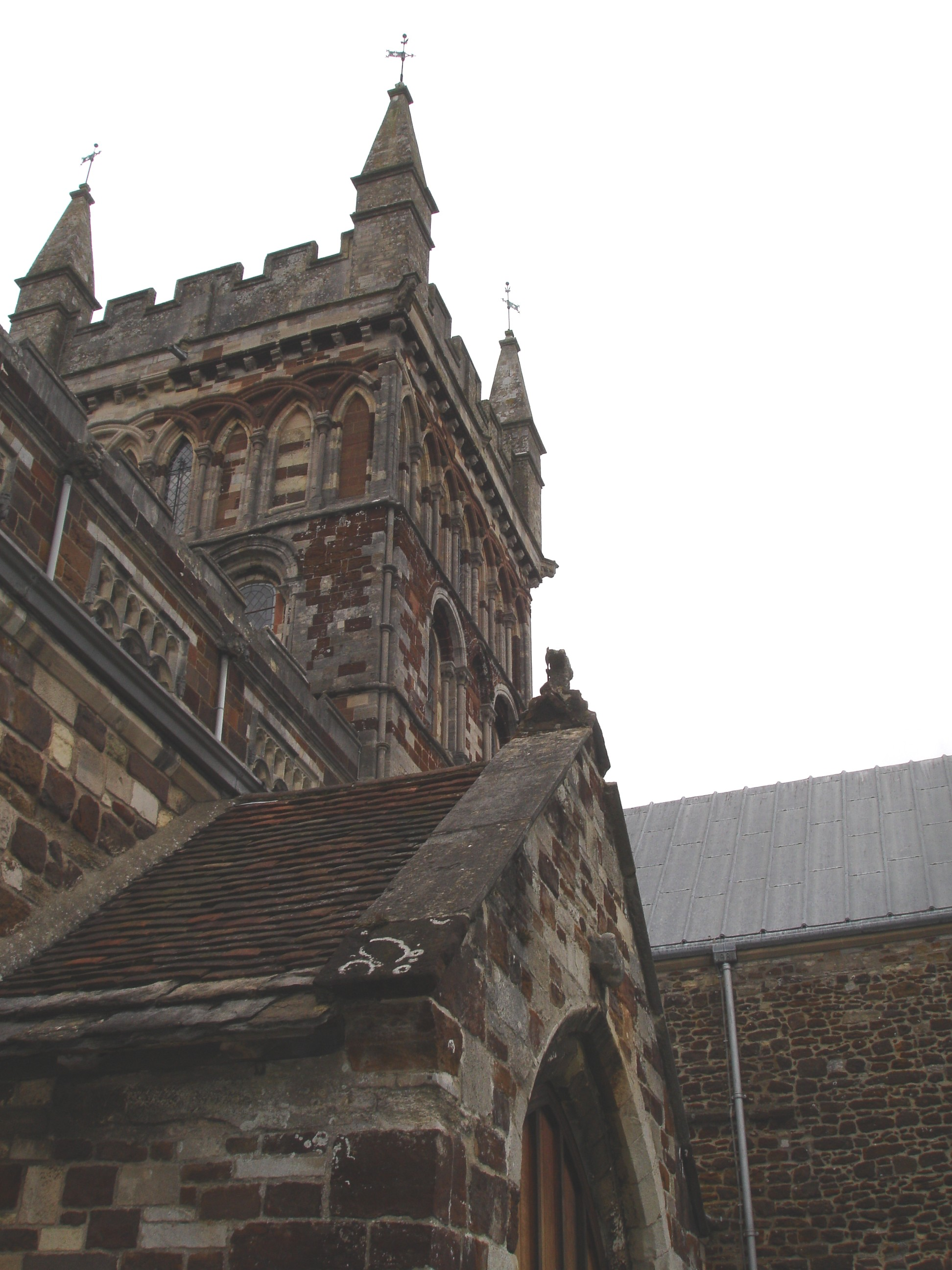
The tower from the south west

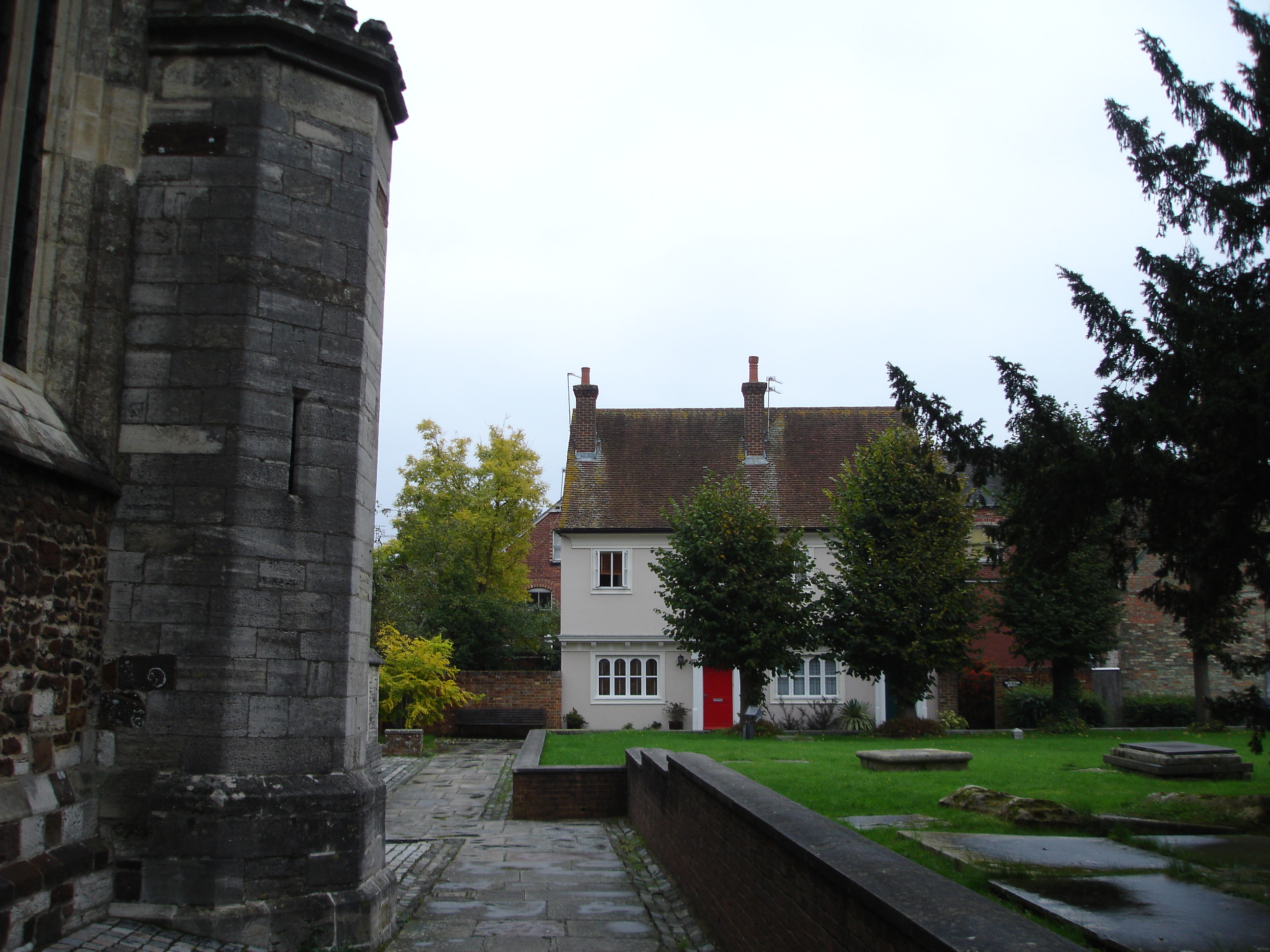
The minster close 1

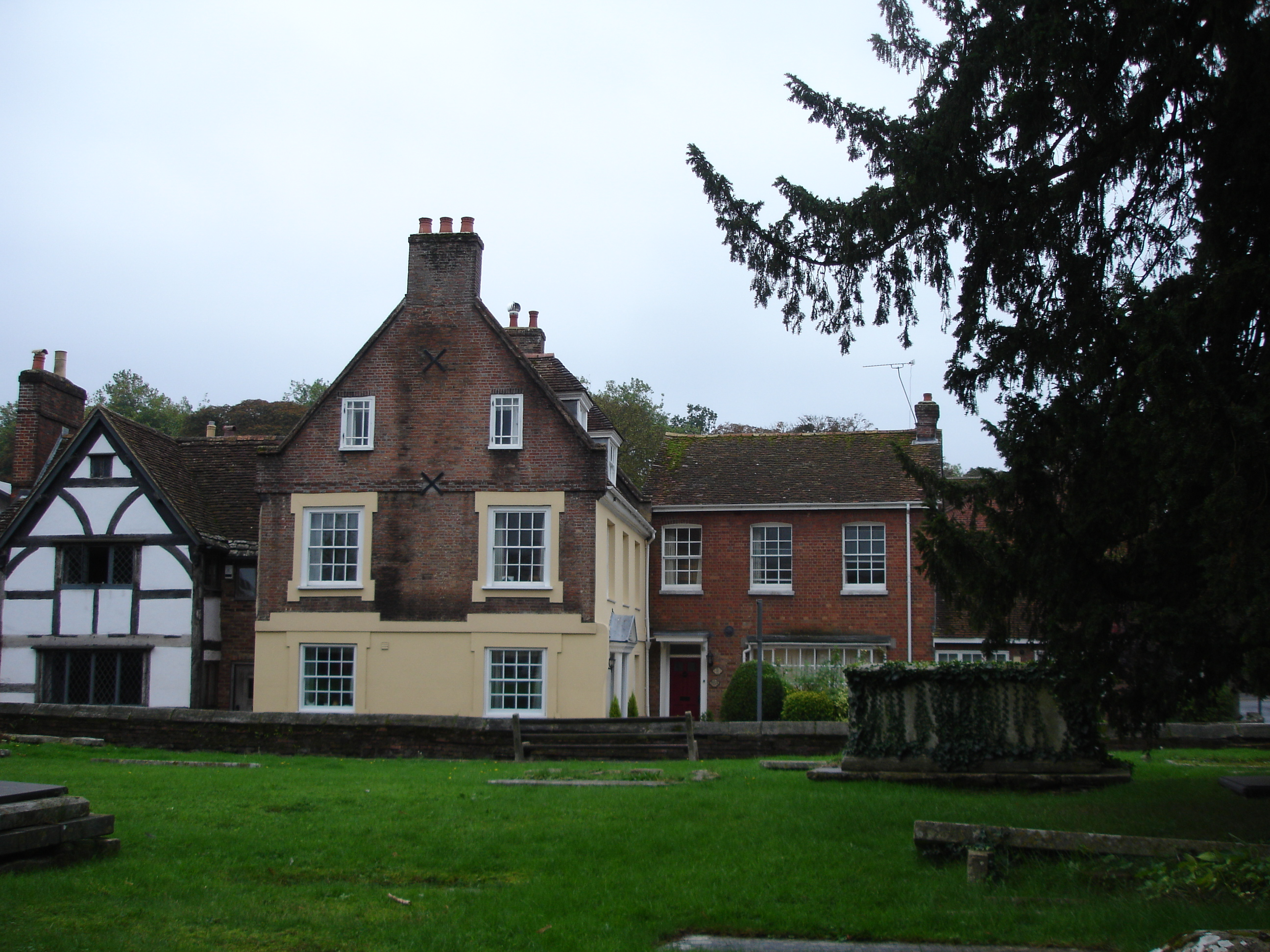
The minster close 2

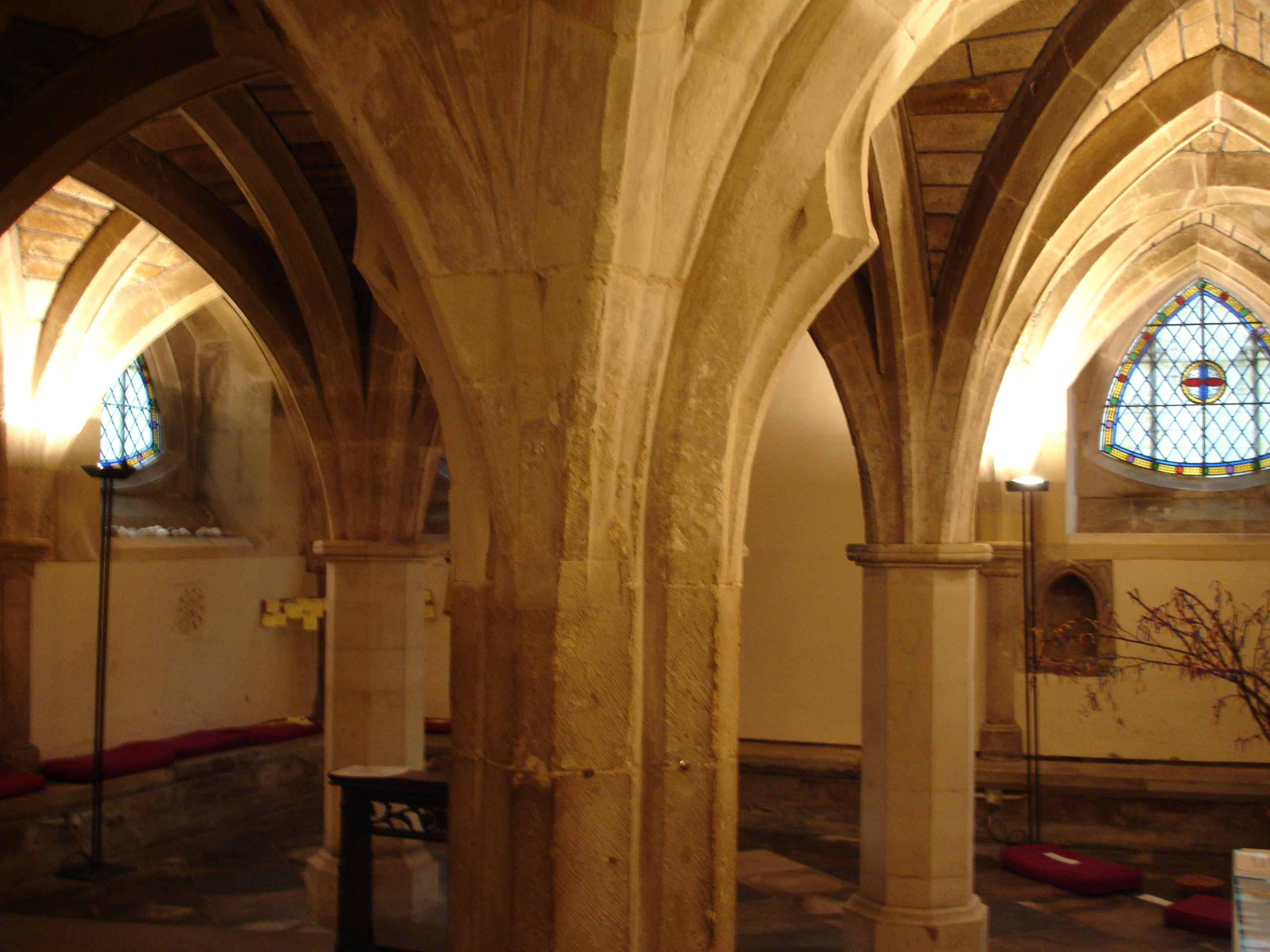
The crypt of the minster 1

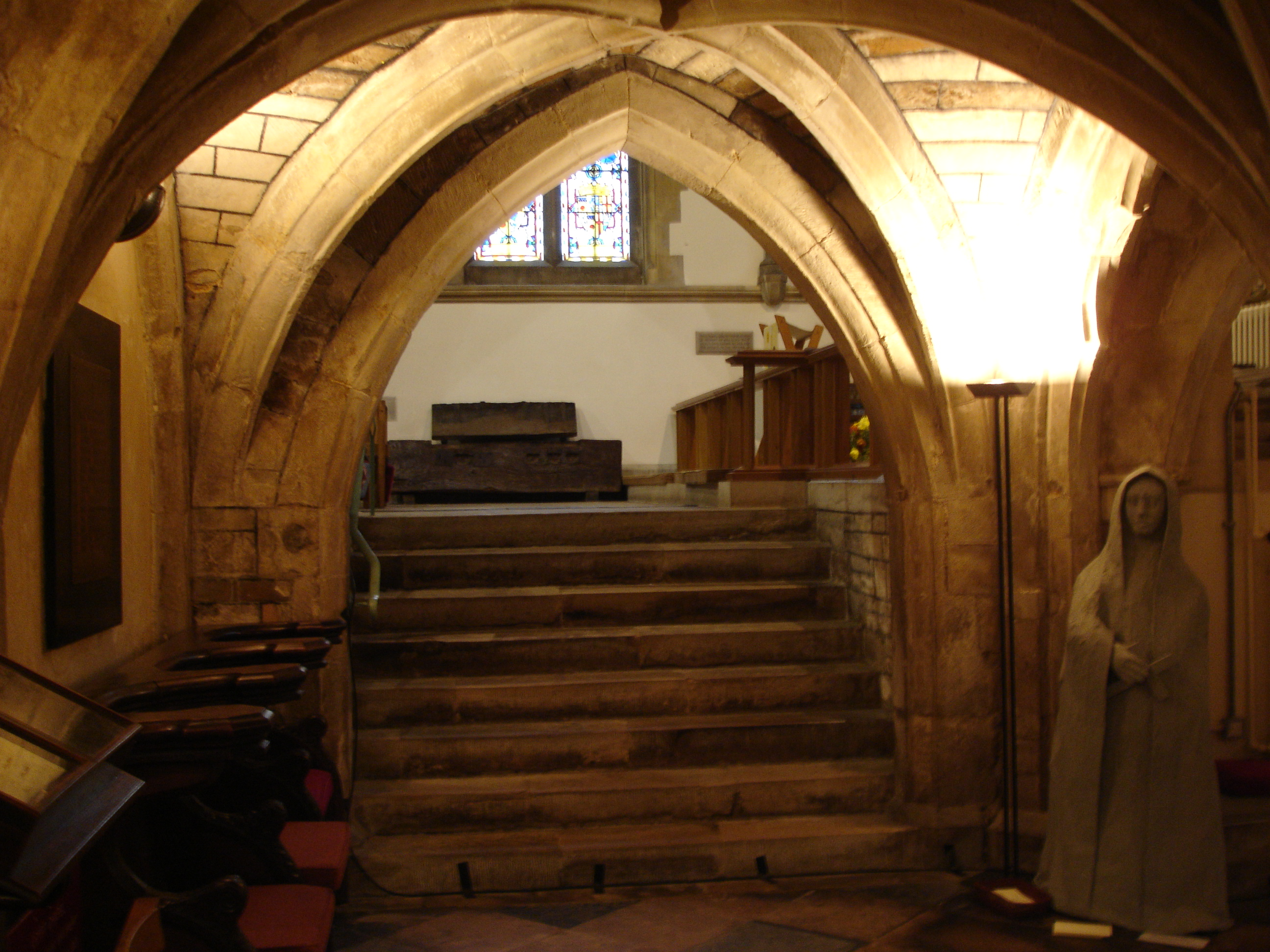
The crypt of the minster 2

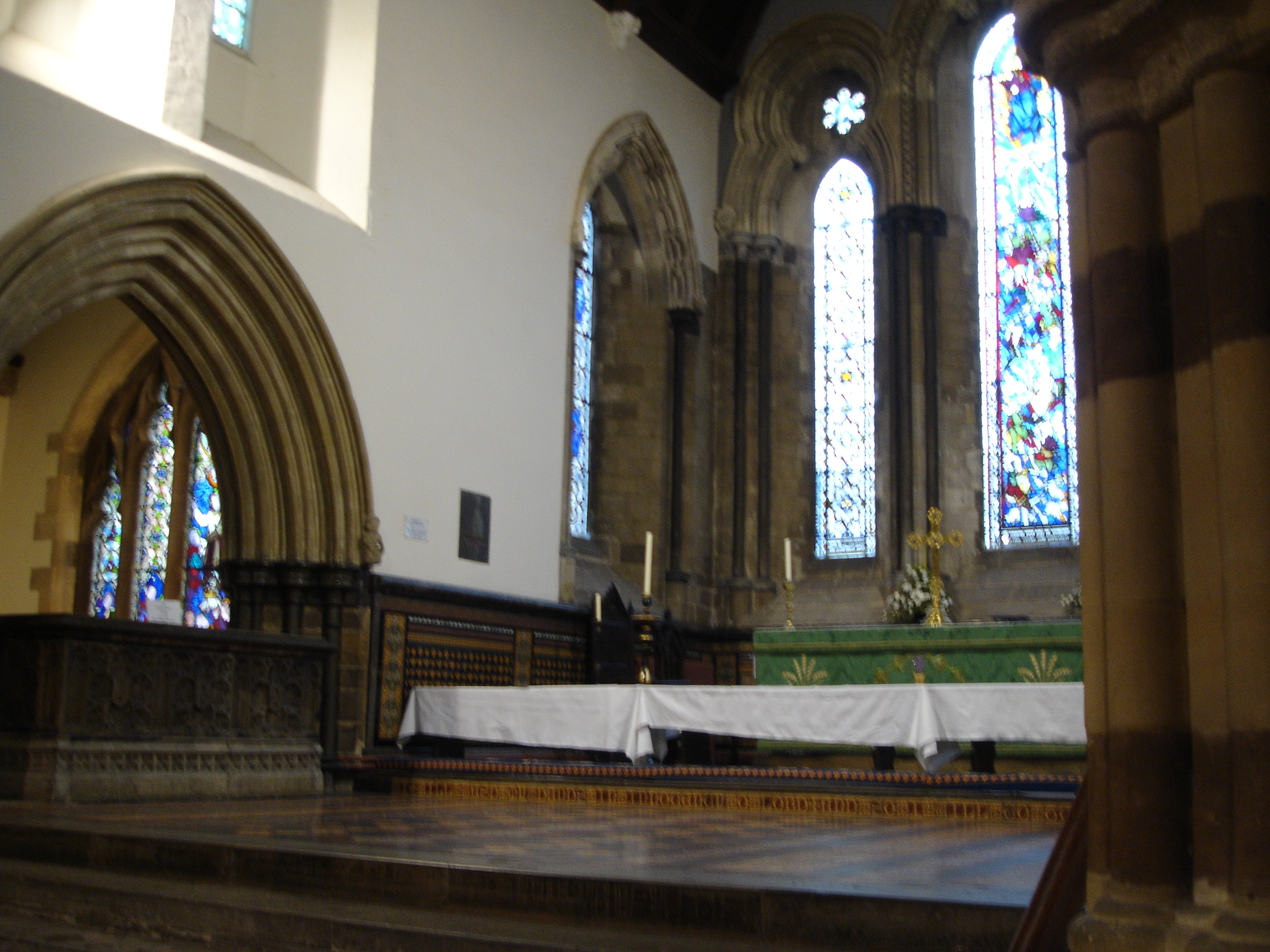
The altar and the brass to King Ethelred I

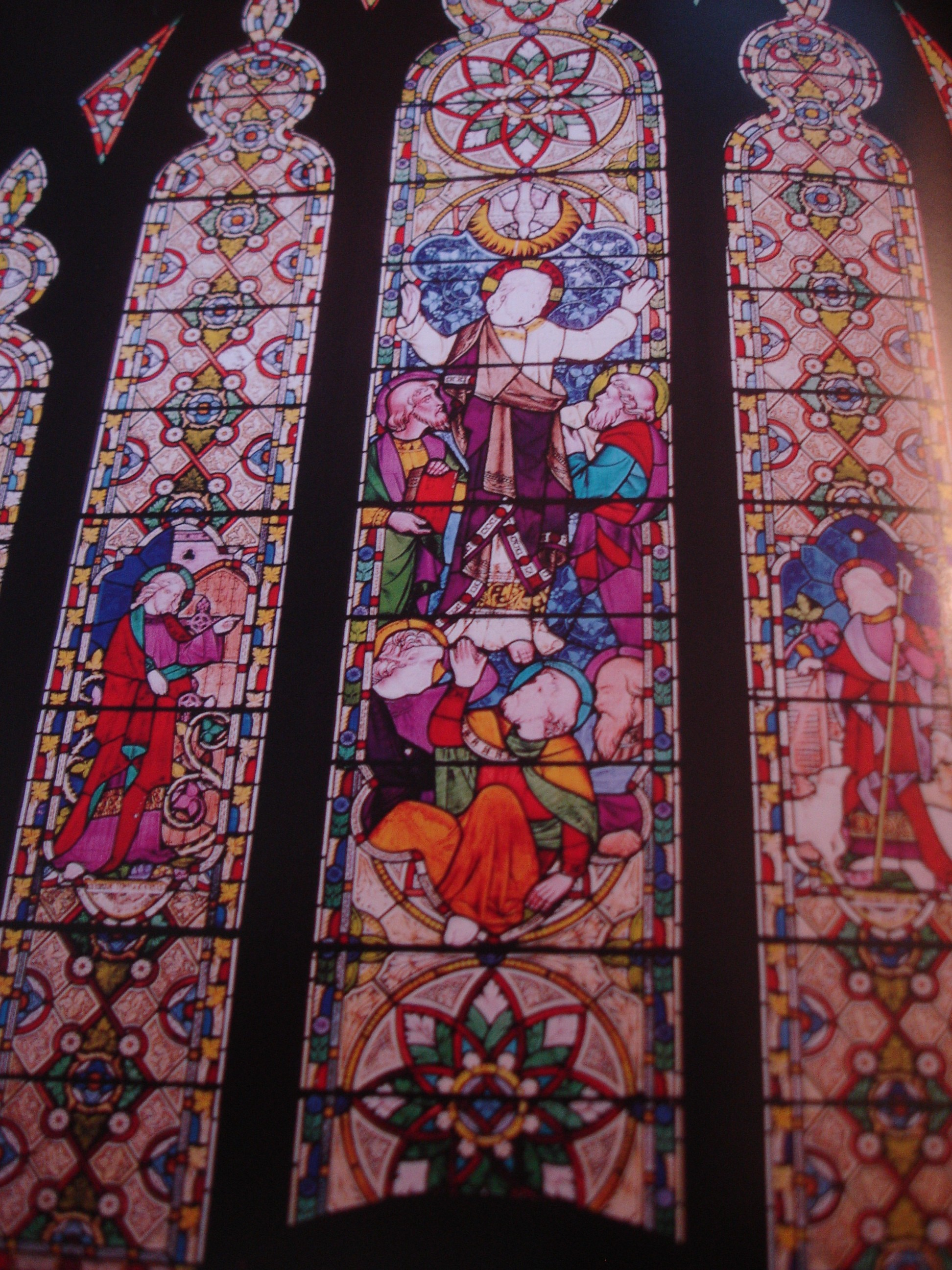
The window of St. Georges Chapel

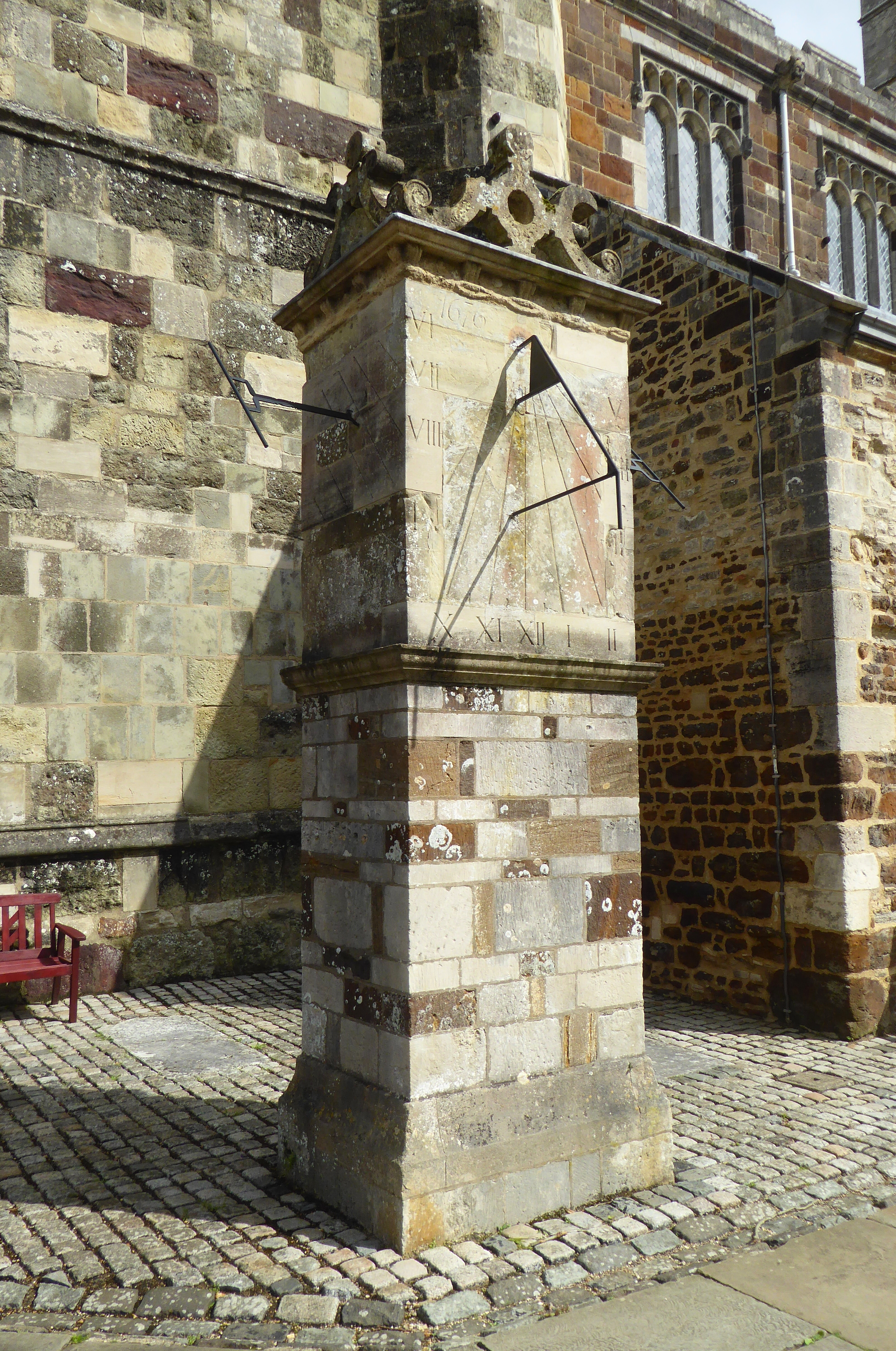
Sundial outside the church
