= Ripon Jewel =

Medieval jewellery found in Ripon, North Yorkshire, England

The Ripon Jewel was found close to Ripon Cathedral in 1976. It is a small gold round piece of jewellery, believed to date from the seventh century. Gem settings have been fashioned on the front with strips of gold, however the piece's central setting and inner arcs of inlay are missing.

It has been suggested that the piece was made to adorn a relic casket, cross or other church fitting.
