= Osred I of Northumbria =

Osred I

King of Northumbria
- Reign: 705–716
- Predecessor: Eadwulf I of Northumbria
- Successor: Coenred
- Born: c. 697
- Died: 716 (aged 18–19)
- Father: Aldfrith of Northumbria
- Mother: Cuthburh

Osred I (c. 697 – 716) was king of Northumbria, his reign lasting for at least since February or March 705 AD till his death in 716 AD (the age of 19), he was the son of King Aldfrith of Northumbria. Aldfrith's only known wife was Cuthburh, but it is not known for certain whether Osred was her son. Osred did not directly succeed his father (because of his young age), as Eadwulf I seized the throne, but held it for only a few months.

At the time that the usurper Eadwulf was overthrown, Osred was only a child, and the government was controlled by the powerful Bishop Wilfrid, presumably assisted by ealdormen such as Berhtfrith son of Berhtred. Osred was adopted as Wilfrid's son at this time. Wilfrid's death in 709 appears to have caused no instability at the time, which, together with the rapid rise and more rapid fall of Eadwulf, speaks to a degree of stability and continuity in early 8th century Northumbria which would not long outlast Osred's reign.

In 711 ealdorman Berhtfrith inflicted a crushing defeat on the Picts, in the area around the upper Forth, but the reign of Osred is otherwise unremarkable politically. Domestically, a variety of ecclesiastical sources portray Osred as a dissolute and debauched young man, and a seducer of nuns. While Bede positively referred to Osred as a new Josiah, Aethelwulf's early ninth-century poem De Abbatibus describes Osred as energetic in deeds and words, mighty in arms and bold in his own strength. Æthelwulf also refers to Osred as rash, foolish, and unable to control his desires (ll. 35–51) and also as a tyrant who forced many political enemies into monastic communities (ll. 49-51 and 65).

Osred reached his majority in 715 or 716, and within a very short period he was killed. The manner of his death is unclear. The Anglo-Saxon Chronicle states that he was killed "south of the border". David Rollason and N.J. Higham presume that the border in question is the southern Pictish border, and that the Picts slew Osred.

| Preceded by Eadwulf | King of Northumbria | Succeeded by Coenred |
