= Ceolwulf of Northumbria =

8th-century King of Northumbria

Saint Ceolwulf of Northumbria

King, Monk
- Born: 7th century
- Died: 765
- Venerated in: Catholic Church; Eastern Orthodox Church; Anglican Communion
- Feast: 15 January

Ceolwulf was King of Northumbria from 729 until 737, except for a short period in 731 or 732 when he was briefly deposed and then restored to power. Ceolwulf ultimately abdicated and entered the monastery at Lindisfarne. He was the "most glorious king" to whom Bede dedicated his Historia ecclesiastica gentis Anglorum.

== Life ==
Ceolwulf was born around 695 in Northumbria. His ancestry is thus given by the Anglo-Saxon Chronicle: "Ceolwulf was the son of Cutha, Cutha of Cuthwin, Cuthwin of Leoldwald, Leoldwald of Egwald, Egwald of Aldhelm, Aldhelm of Ocga, Ocga of Ida, Ida of Eoppa." Ceolwulf's brother, Coenred, seized the Northumbrian throne in 716. Coenred ruled for two years when Osric, the last of the House of Aethelric, claimed the throne and ruled for ten years. In 729, shortly before his death, Osric nominated Ceolwulf as his successor.

He consulted the Venerable Bede for advice on important matters. While praising Ceolwulf's piety, Bede also expressed some reservations regarding Ceolwulf's ability to rule. Ceolwulf was a man with deep monastic interests and perhaps little suited to affairs of state. Bede dedicated his Historia ecclesiastica gentis Anglorum (History of the English Church) to Ceolwulf in 731. The beginning of his reign was disturbed by factions and rebellion, and that same year he was forcibly seized by his enemies and compelled to receive the monastic tonsure. He was deposed for a short period but quickly restored. The details of the attempted coup are unclear. Bishop Acca of Hexham is said to have been deprived of his see, which suggests he may have supported Ceolwulf's opponents. Ceolwulf named his cousin Ecgbert to the see of York around 732 or 734.

It has been suggested that Ceolwulf had spent time in Ireland, perhaps studying to enter into religion. As king, he had endowed the monastery at Lindisfarne with many gifts. He obtained a special dispensation for the monks which allowed the consumption of beer and wine, contrary to the established Celtic practice which limited beverages to water and milk. In 737, Ceolwulf abdicated in favor of his first cousin Eadberht, to retire to Lindisfarne. His death is recorded in the winter of 764–765. Bishop Ecgred of Lindisfarne translated Ceolwulf's relics to the rebuilt Church of Saint Peter, Cuthbert, and Ceolwulf at Norham.

His feast day is 15 January.

Preceded by Osric	King of Northumbria	Succeeded by Eadberht
