= Bertille of Thuringia =

Merovingian princess and Frankish saint

Saint Bertille
- Born: Bertille of Thuringia
- Died: c. 660 AD; Pagus Hainoensis, Austrasia, Francia
- Venerated in: Roman Catholic Church
- Feast: 11 May

Saint Bertille of Thuringia (French: Sainte Bertille de Thuringe (died c. 660 AD) or also known as Saint Bertilla, the daughter of Bercarius, King of Thuringia, was a Merovingian princess and Frankish saint who resided in the County of Hainaut in Belgium. Bertille was the mother of Saint Waltrude and Saint Aldegund, foundress of Maubeuge Abbey.

== History ==
Princess Bertille was born in the 7th century and was the daughter of Bercarius, King of Thuringia.

Bertille was married to Walbert IV, a prince of Lower Austrasia, whose duchy covered Cambrésis, Hainaut, Brabant, Hesbaye, Ardennes, and extended to the Rhine. They had two daughters: Aldegund and Waltrude. Walbert IV, husband of Saint Bertille, had a younger brother, Brunulphe, who was the Count of Ardennes, whose daughter was Saint Aye (heiress of the County of Haynau after Saint Waltrude).

Her daughter Saint Waltrude was born in the 620s in Cousolre. She married Vincent Madelgarius and had four children: Aldetrude, Landry of Soignies, Madelberte of Maubeuge, and Dentelin of Mons.

Saint Bertille later became a nun at Maubeuge Abbey, founded by her daughter.

== Death ==
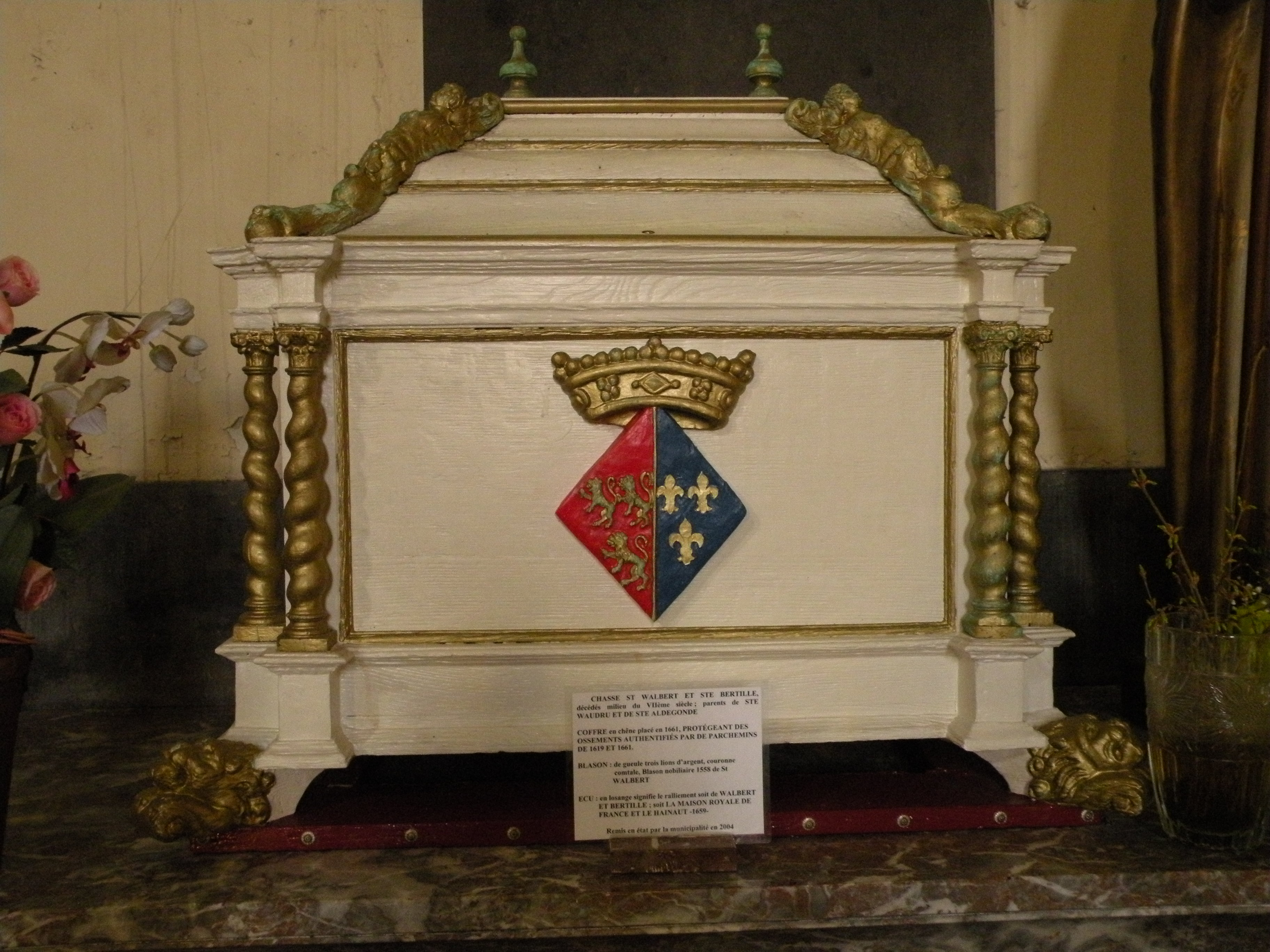
Oak chest placed at Église Saint-Martin de Cousolre in 1661 protecting the bones of St. Walbert and Ste. Bertille.

Saint Bertille died in c. 660 AD in the pagus Hainoensis, Austrasia, Francia (now Hainaut Province, Belgium). She was buried with her husband in Cousolre, in the old church of Cousolre, later destroyed. Her daughter Saint Aldegund established a convent of twelve Benedictine nuns near their tombs. When Saint Aldegund visited in 664 AD, she succumbed to cancer and was buried near her parents Bertille and Walbert. In 690 AD, her body was moved to Maubeuge Abbey by her niece, Saint Adeltrude, who succeeded her as abbess.

Bertille and her husband Walbert IV are both canonized. Their relics were preserved and placed at the Saint-Martin Church in Cousolre (French: Église Saint-Martin de Cousolre) in 1661.

On her death, her daughter Saint Waltrude inherited the lands and titles, marrying Prince Madelgaire. Their son Landry (or Landric) and two daughters entered the Monastery of St. Aldegund, and after their son Dentelin's death, the duchy was left to their cousin Saint Aye, who devoted her inheritance to Saint Waltrude's church.
