= Dentelin of Mons =

Frankish saint

Saint Dentelin
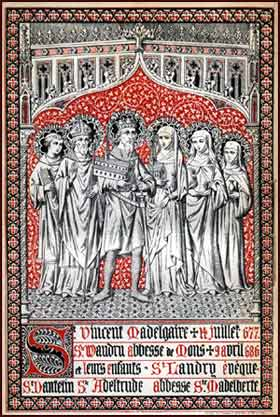
- Born: Dentelin c. 649; Pagus Hainoensis, Kingdom of Austrasia, Francia
- Died: c. 16 March 656; Mons, Pagus Hainoensis, Kingdom of Austrasia, Francia
- Venerated in: Mons; Soignies; Rees; Emmerich am Rhein
- Feast: 16 March

Dentelin of Mons, also known as Dentelin of Soignies (Latin: Dentelinus; died c. 16 March 656) was a Frankish saint. He was the son of Saint Waltrude and Madelgaire.

== Biography ==
Dentelin was born around c. 649 AD in the pagus Hainoensis, Kingdom of Austrasia, Francia (now Hainaut Province, Belgium).

Belonging to a family of saints, he was the fourth child of Saint Waltrude and Vincent Madelgarius with his siblings including Aldetrude of Maubeuge, Madelberte of Maubeuge, and Landry of Soignies. He was born after Landry. His grandfather was Saint Walbert IV, his grandmother was Saint Bertille, and his aunt was Saint Aldegund, first abbess of Maubeuge.

== Death ==
Saint Dentelin died around c. 16 March 656 AD at the age of seven in the pagus Hainoensis, Kingdom of Austrasia, Francia (now Hainaut Province, Belgium).

His body was first placed in Cousolre in the family tomb next to that of Saint Walbert IV. St. Dentelin's remains were later conveyed to the Church of Saint-Vincent de Soignies in Hainaut and kept in a shrine beside those of his father Madelgaire. He was then transported and venerated at Rees, a small town on the Rhine in the Duchy of Cleves between Emmerich and Wesel. The canons of the church of Rees customarily celebrated his memory every year on 14 July. Through the intercession of Dentelin, his relics were attributed with many miracles at Rees, particularly assisting the sick and suffering. In 1040, Saint Irmgrade, daughter to the Count of Zutphen, established the collegiate church in Emmerich am Rhein to honor the Blessed Virgin.

His feast day is celebrated in Soignies of Hainaut on 16 May. The collegiate church of the town of Rees, in the land of Cleves, honors him as patron and celebrates his feast on 14 July, the same day as Saint Vincent. The church and parish of Saint Aldegonde in Emmerich on 14 March.

== Gallery ==
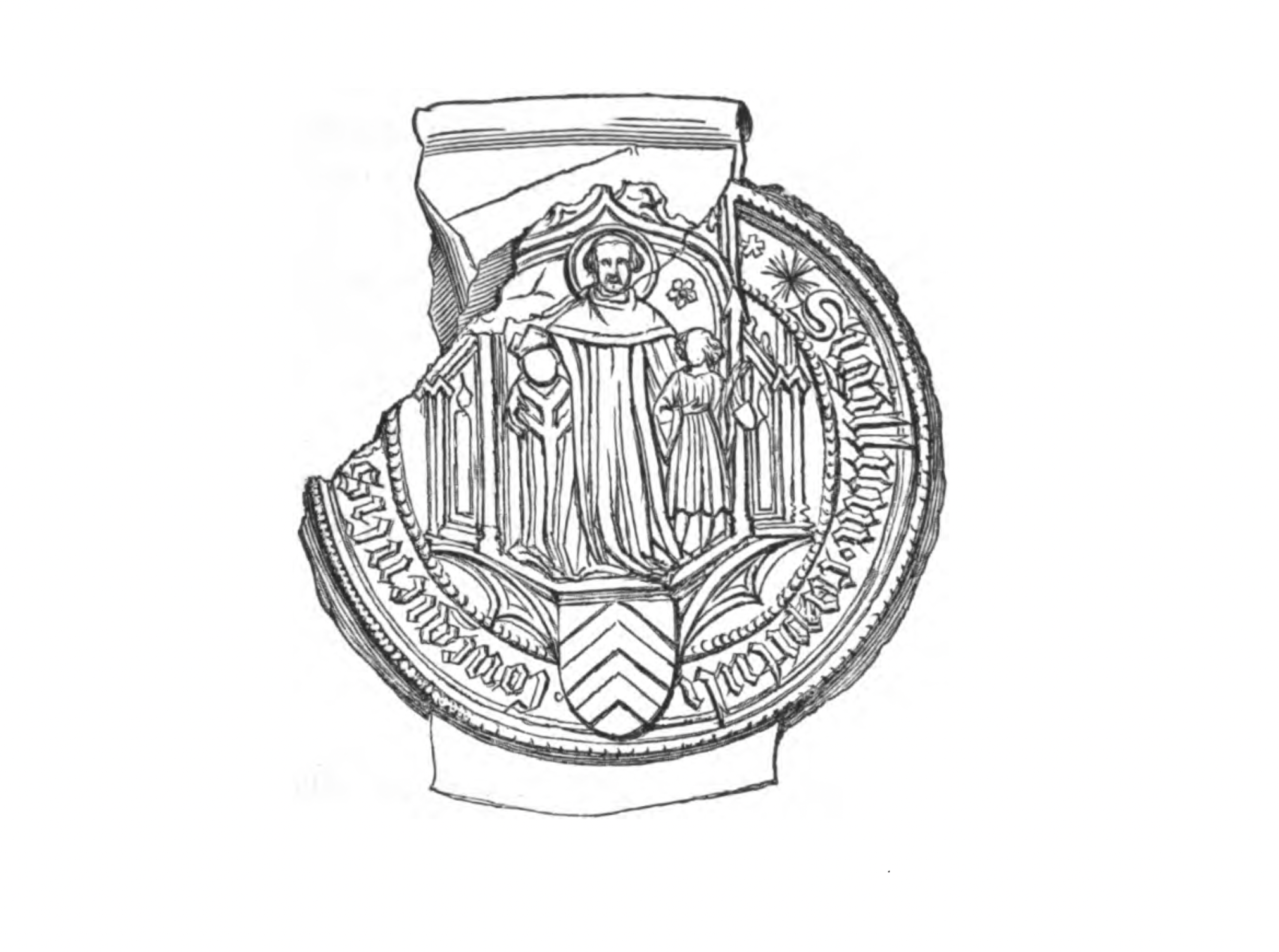
Seal of the Chapter of Soignies depicting Saint Vincent and his two sons, Landry and Dentelin.
