= Landry of Soignies =

Frankish saint

Saint Landry
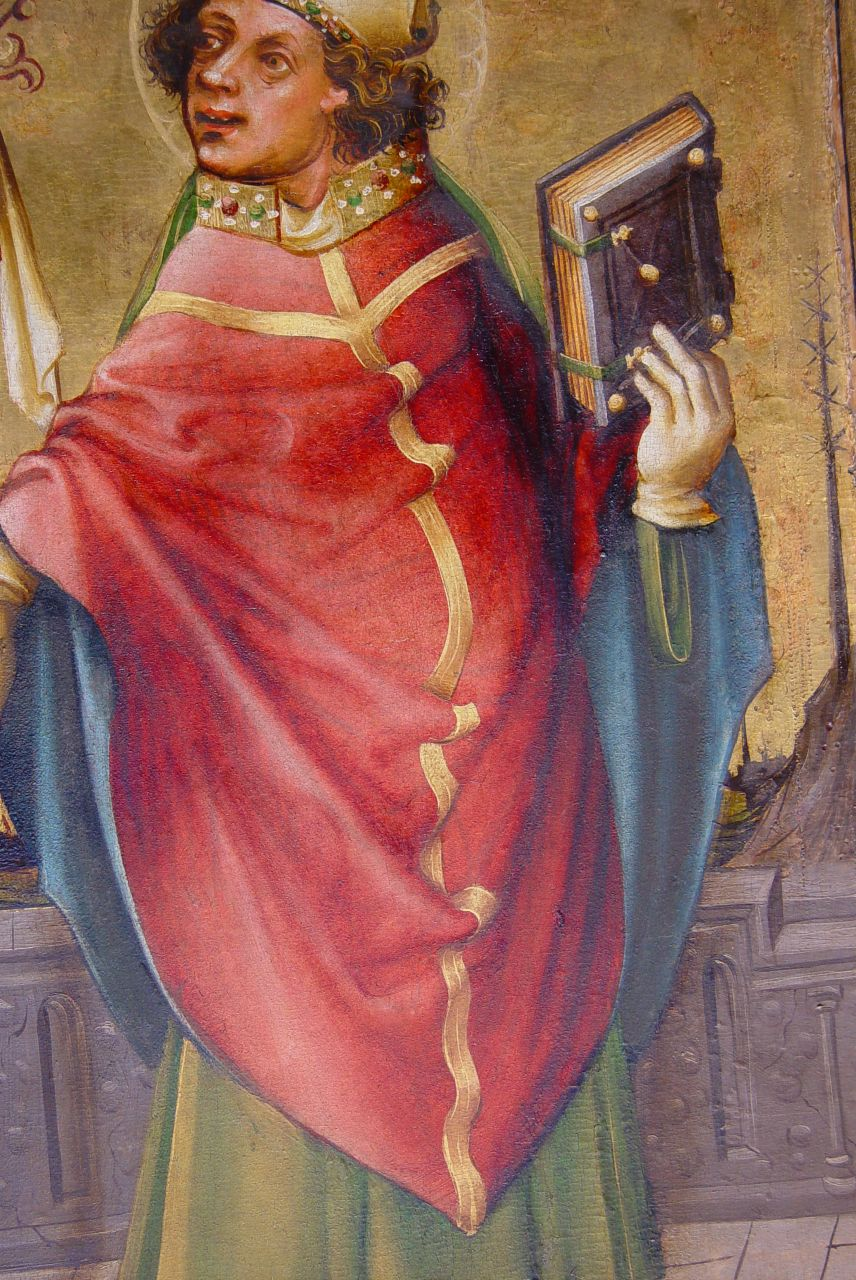

Bishop of Metz
- Born: Landry c. 622–637 AD; Pagus Hainoensis, Austrasia, Francia
- Died: 17 April 692–700 AD; Soignies, Pagus Hainoensis, Austrasia, Francia
- Venerated in: Roman Catholic Church
- Feast: 17 April

Landry, Landric, Landericus, or Landry of Soignies, commonly known as Saint Landry of Metz (died c. 17 April 692–700 AD) was a Roman Catholic Bishop of Metz, Benedictine abbot of Haumont and Soignies, and a Frankish saint. He was the son of Saint Waltrude and Madelgaire.

== Biography ==
Landry was born in the 7th century in the pagus Hainoensis, Kingdom of Austrasia, Francia (now Hainaut Province, Belgium).

Landry was born to Saint Waltrude and Vincent Madelgarius. He had three siblings which included Aldetrude of Maubeuge, Madelberte of Maubeuge, and Dentelin of Mons. He was the grandson of Saint Walbert IV and Saint Bertille, and had an aunt, Saint Aldegund, who was the first abbess of Maubeuge.

Saint Landry maintained great regularity at the Abbey of Haumont founded by his father Madelgaire who later established another monastery in the forest of Soignies (now Collegiate Church of Saint-Vincent). When his parents entered separate monasteries, Landry was already occupying the episcopal seat of Meaux. With Saint Vincent's health declining, Landry was summoned from Meaux, who left his post to succeed his father in the religious role. He took over as abbot of his father's monasteries in 660 AD, followed by Halidulphe in 675, who then received the monastery.

He was appointed as the 34th Bishop of Metz in France and known as Saint Landry of Metz.

== Death ==
Saint Landry died on c. 17 April 692–700 AD in Soignies, pagus Hainoensis, Kingdom of Austrasia, Francia (now Hainaut Province, Belgium).

On 1 October 1864, the shrine of Saint Landry, intricately carved and gilded in Renaissance style, was opened by Vicar General Charles-Joseph Voisin. The relics had been venerated in Soignies, which recorded three visits in 1269, 1406, and 1595.

== Gallery ==
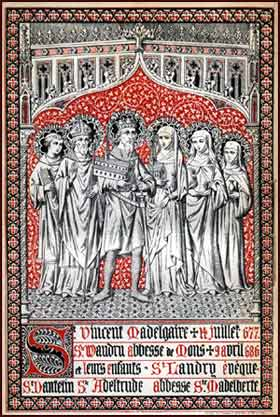
Madelgaire, Waudru, and their four children (Landry is the second left).

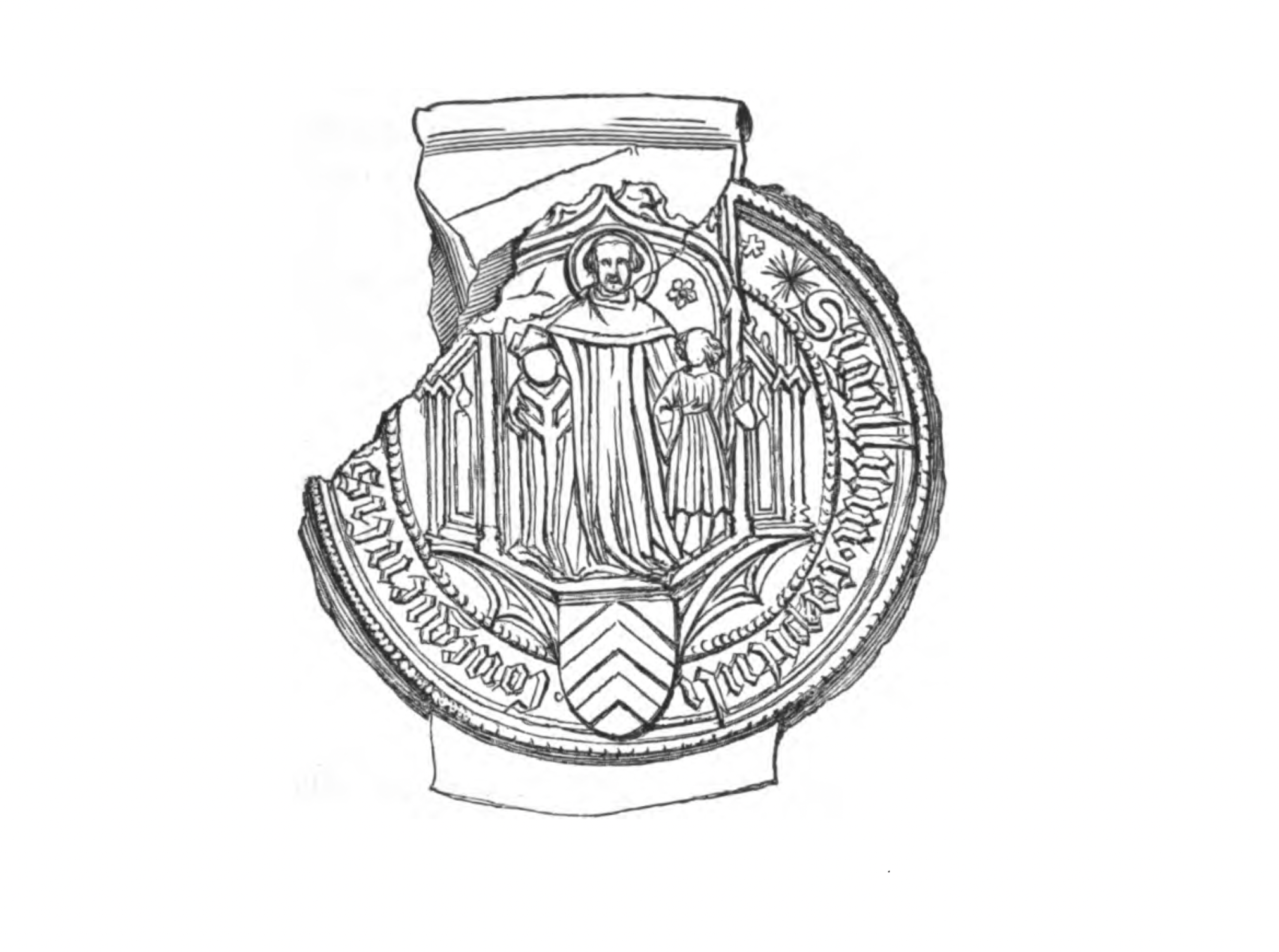
Seal of the Chapter of Soignies depicting Saint Vincent and his two sons: Landry and Dentelin.
