= Archdiocese of Cambrai =

Roman Catholic archdiocese in France

Coordinates: 50.1732°N 3.23305°E

Archdiocese of Cambrai Archidioecesis Cameracensis Archidiocèse de Cambrai

Catholic
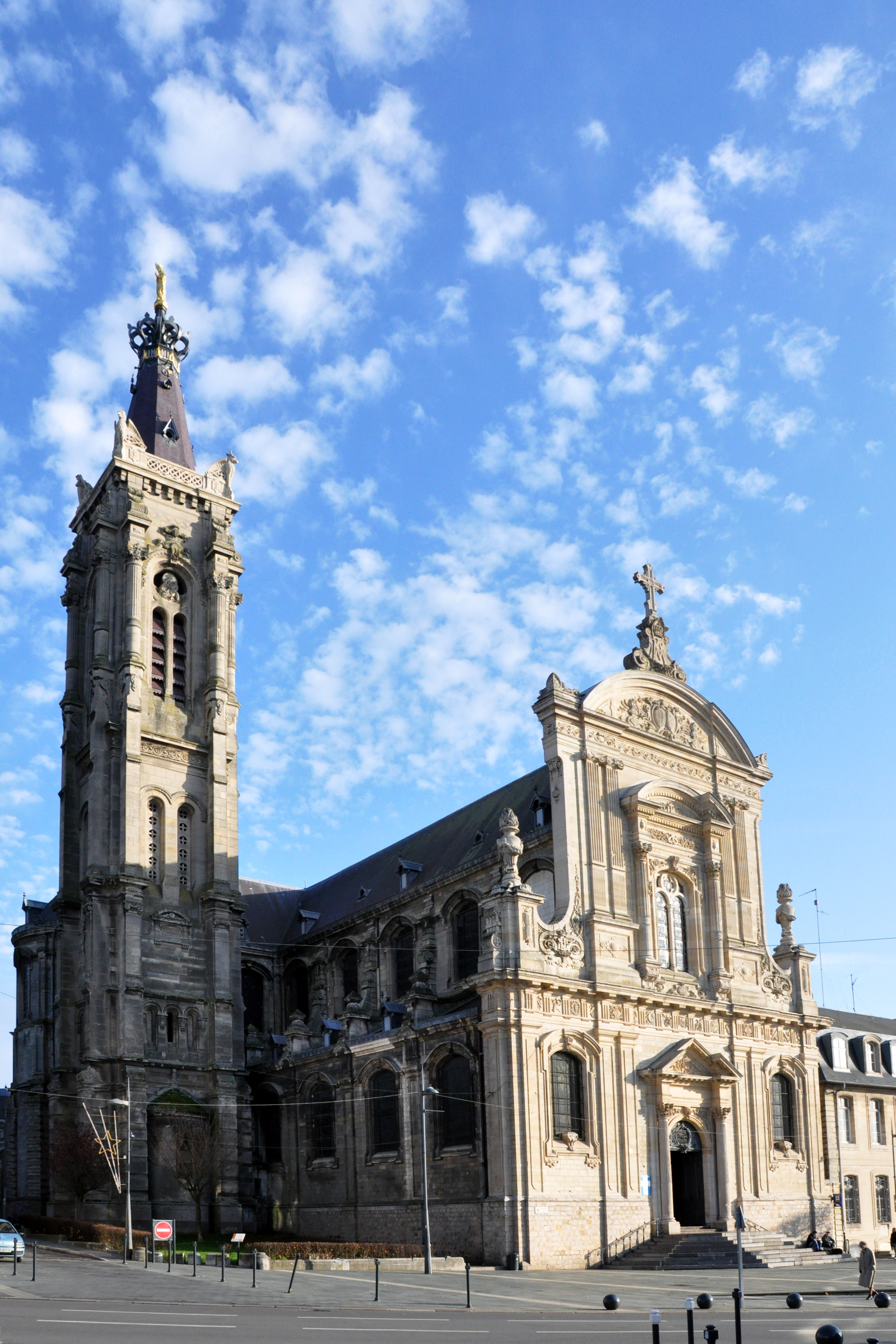
- Cambrai Cathedral

- Coat of arms

Location
- Country: France
- Ecclesiastical province: Lille

Statistics
- Area: 3,420 km^{2} (1,320 sq mi)
- Population: Total; Catholics: (as of 2023); 1,015,000; 918,480 (90.5%)
- Parishes: 50

Information
- Denomination: Catholic Church
- Sui iuris church: Latin Church
- Rite: Roman Rite
- Established: 580
- Cathedral: Cathedral of Our Lady of Graces in Cambrai
- Patron saint: Saint Gaugericus of Cambrai
- Secular priests: 111 (Diocesan); 8 (Religious Orders); 51 Permanent Deacons

Current leadership
- Pope: Leo XIV
- Archbishop: Vincent Dollmann
- Metropolitan Archbishop: Laurent Le Boulc'h

Map

Website
- cathocambrai.com

The Archdiocese of Cambrai (Latin: Archdiocesis Cameracensis; French: Archidiocèse de Cambrai) is a Latin Church ecclesiastical jurisdiction or archdiocese of the Catholic Church in France, comprising the arrondissements of Avesnes-sur-Helpe, Cambrai, Douai, and Valenciennes within the département of Nord, in the region of Nord-Pas-de-Calais. The current archbishop is Vincent Dollmann, appointed in August 2018. Since 2008 the archdiocese has been a suffragan of the Archdiocese of Lille.

== History ==
=== Early history ===
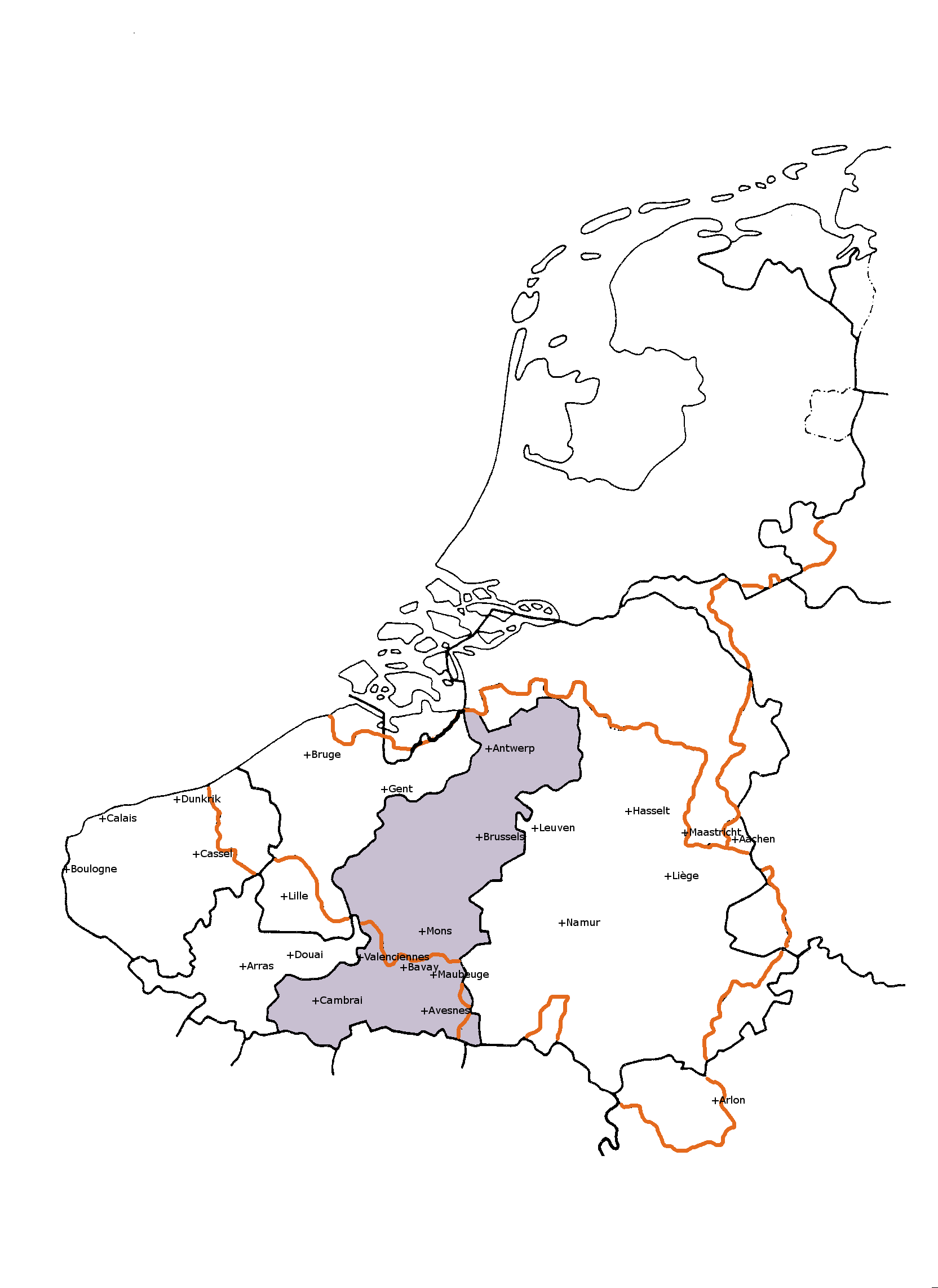
The medieval diocese of Cambrai was based upon the Roman civitas of the Nervii.

Originally erected in the late 6th century as the Diocese of Cambrai, when the episcopal see after the death of the Frankish bishop Saint Vedast (Vaast) was relocated here from Arras. Though subordinate to the Archdiocese of Reims, Cambrai's jurisdiction was immense and included even Brussels and Antwerp.

=== Middle Ages ===
In the early Middle Ages the Diocese of Cambrai was included in that part of Lotharingia which at first had been allocated to the West Frankish king Charles the Bald by the Treaty of Meerssen of 870 but, after various vicissitudes, came under the rule of the German king Henry the Fowler in 925. After the revolt by Duke Gilbert of Lorraine collapsed at the Battle of Andernach of 939, Louis IV of France renounced the Lotharingian lands, and in 941 Henry's son and successor King Otto I of Germany ratified all the privileges that had been accorded to the Bishops of Cambrai by the Frankish rulers.

In 1007, the Bishops gained an immediate secular territory when Emperor Henry II invested them with authority over the former County of Cambrésis; the Bishop of Cambrai thus became the overlord of the twelve "peers of Cambresis". The Prince-Bishopric of Cambrai became an Imperial State, located between the County of Hainaut and the border with Flanders and Vermandois in the Kingdom of France, while the citizens of Cambrai struggled to gain the autonomous status of an Imperial city. In 1093/94, the see of Arras was revived by the counts of Flanders which became an independent diocese in the kingdom of France. Pope Urban II approved as Cambrai had been unwilling to accept the Cluniac reforms and Arras offered the chance to create a new center of ecclesiastic reform.

In the 14th and 15th centuries, the bishopric was temporarily a protectorate of the Burgundian dukes, which in 1482, as part of the inheritance of Mary the Rich, passed to her husband Maximilian I of Habsburg.

Cambrai from 1512 was part of the Imperial Lower Rhenish–Westphalian Circle and – like the Prince-Bishopric of Liège – was not incorporated into the Seventeen Provinces of the Burgundian Circle. Nevertheless, the creation in 1559 of the new metropolitan See of Mechelen and of eleven other dioceses in the Southern Netherlands was at the request of King Philip II of Spain, in order to facilitate the struggle against the Reformation. The change greatly restricted the limits of the Diocese of Cambrai, which, when thus dismembered, was made by way of compensation an archiepiscopal see with the dioceses of Saint Omer, Tournai and Namur as suffragans. The councils of Leptines, at which Saint Boniface played an important role, were held in what was then the part of the former Diocese of Cambrai in the Southern Netherlands.

=== Early Modern History ===
Under King Louis XIV the Bishopric of Cambrai finally became French after the Siege of Cambrai of 1677, confirmed in the Treaties of Nijmegen of 1678 and 1679. From 1790 Cambrai was part of the new Nord department. By the Napoleonic Concordat of 1801, Cambrai was again reduced to a simple bishopric, suffragan to Paris, and included remnants of the former dioceses of Tournai, Ypres, and Saint Omer. In 1817 both the pope and King Louis XVIII were eager for the erection of a see at Lille, but Bishop Louis de Belmas (1757–1841), a former constitutional bishop, vigorously opposed it. Immediately upon his death, in 1841, Cambrai once more became an archbishopric, with the diocese of Arras as suffragan.

== Notable people ==
The list of notable people associated with the Diocese of Cambrai is very extensive, and their biographies, although short, take up no less than four volumes of the work by Canon Destombes. Exclusive of those saints whose history would be of interest only in connection with the Belgian territory formerly belonging to the diocese, mention may be made of:

- Blessed Evermod, disciple of Saint Norbert and first Bishop of Ratzeburg in Germany (twelfth century);
- Blessed Charles le Bon, Count of Flanders, son of King Canute IV of Denmark and assassinated at Bruges in 1127;
- Blessed Beatrice of Lens, a recluse (thirteenth century).

The Jesuits Cortyl and du Béron, first apostles of the Pelew Islands, were martyred in 1701, and Chomé (1696–1767), who was prominent in the Missions of Paraguay and Argentina in the province of Misiones, also the Oratorian Gratry (1805–1872), philosopher and member of the French Academy, were natives of the Diocese of Cambrai. The English college of Douai, founded by William Allen in 1568, gave in subsequent centuries a certain number of apostles and martyrs to Catholic England. Since the promulgation of the law of 1875 on higher education, Lille has been the seat of important Catholic faculties.

Notable French and Flemish composers who served as maître de chapelle at Cambrai include Guillaume Dufay, Robert de Févin, Johannes Lupus and Jean de Bonmarché.

See also Johann Esch and Heinrich Voes.

== Notable chronicle ==
A chronicle of the bishops of Cambrai was written in the 11th century. This Gesta episcoporum Cambracensium was for some time attributed to Balderic, archbishop of Noyon, but it now seems that the author was an anonymous canon of Cambrai. The work is of considerable importance for the history of the north of France during the 11th century, and was first published in 1615.

== Places ==
=== Abbeys ===
Under the old regime the Archdiocese of Cambrai contained forty-one abbeys, eighteen of which belonged to the Benedictines. Chief among them were:

- the Abbey of St. Géry, founded near Cambrai about the year 600 in honour of St. Médard by St. Géry (580–619), deacon of the church of Treves, and who built a chapel on the bank of the Senne, on the site of the future city of Brussels;
- the Abbey of Hautmont, founded in the seventh century by St. Vincent Madelgarus, the husband of St. Wandru, who was foundress of the chapter at Mons;
- the Abbey of Soignies, founded by the same St. Vincent, and having for abbots his son Landri and, in the eleventh century, St. Richard;
- the Abbey of Maubeuge, founded in 661 by St. Aldegonde the sister of St. Wandru and a descendant of Clovis and the kings of Thuringia, among whose successors as abbesses were her niece, St. Aldetrude (d. 696) and another niece, St. Amalberte (d. 705), herself the mother of two saints, one of whom, St. Gudule, was a nun at Nivelles and became patroness of Brussels, and the other, St. Raynalde, a martyr;
- the Abbey of Lobbes which, in the seventh and eighth centuries, had as abbots St. Landelin, St. Ursmar, St. Ermin, and St. Theodulph, and in the tenth century, Heriger, the ecclesiastical writer;
- the Abbey of Crespin, founded in the seventh century by St. Landelin, who was succeeded by St. Adelin;
- the Abbey of Maroilles (seventh century), which St. Humbert I, who died in 682, was abbot; the abbey was sacked and destroyed, 1791–1794, and used as a quarry for stones. It no longer exists.
- the Abbey of Elno, founded in the seventh century by St. Amandus and endowed by Dagobert;
- the Abbey of St. Ghislain, founded c. 650 by St. Ghislain, and having as abbots St. Gerard (tenth century) and St. Poppo (eleventh century);
- the Abbey of Marchiennes, founded by St. Rictrudes (end of the seventh century);
- the Abbey of Liessies (eighth century) which, in the sixteenth century, had for abbot Louis de Blois, author of numerous spiritual writings;
- the Abbey of St. Sauve de Valenciennes (ninth century), founded in honour of the itinerant bishop Sauve (Salvius), martyred in Hainaut at the end of the eighth century;
- the Abbey of Cysoing, founded about 854 by St. Eberhard, Count of Flanders, Duke of Frioul and son-in-law of Louis the Debonair.

=== Pilgrimages ===
The principal places of pilgrimage are:

- Notre-Dame de la Treille at Lille, a church dedicated in 1066 by Baldwin V, Count of Flanders, visited by St. Thomas of Canterbury, St. Bernard, and Pope Innocent III, and where, on 14 June 1254, fifty-three cripples were suddenly cured;
- Notre-Dame de Grâce at Cambrai, containing a picture ascribed to St. Luke;
- Notre-Dame des Dunes at Dunkerque, where the special object of interest is a statue which, in the beginning of the fifteenth century, was discovered near the castle of Dunkerque;
- the feast associated with this, 8 September 1793, coincided with the raising of the siege of this city by the Duke of York;
- Notre-Dame des Miracles at Bourbourg, made famous by a miracle wrought in 1383, an account of which was given by the chronicler Froissart, who was an eyewitness. A Benedictine abbey formerly extant here was converted by Marie Antoinette into a house of noble canonesses. Until a comparatively recent date, the great religious solemnities in the diocese often gave rise to ducasses, sumptuous processions in which giants, huge fishes, devils, and representations of heaven and hell figured prominently. Before the law of 1901 was enforced there were in the diocese Augustinians, English Benedictines, Jesuits, Marists, Dominicans, Franciscans, Lazarists, Redemptorists, Camillians, Brothers of St. Vincent de Paul, and Trappists; the last-named still remain. Numerous local congregations of women are engaged in the schools and among the sick, as, for instance: the Augustinian Nuns (founded in the sixth century, mother-house at Cambrai);
- the Bernardines of Our Lady of Flines (founded in the thirteenth century);
- the Daughters of the Infant Jesus (founded in 1824, mother-house at Lille);
- the Bernardines of Esquernes (founded in 1827);
- the Sisters of Providence, or of St. Therese (mother-house at Avesnes);
- the Sisters of Our Lady of Treille (mother-house at Lille), and the Religious of the Holy Union of the Sacred Hearts (mother-house at Douai).

== See also ==
- Catholic Church in France

== Bibliography ==
=== Reference works ===
- Gams, Pius Bonifatius (1873). Series episcoporum Ecclesiae catholicae: quotquot innotuerunt a beato Petro apostolo. Ratisbon: Typis et Sumptibus Georgii Josephi Manz. p. 526–528. (Use with caution; obsolete)
- Eubel, Conradus, ed. (1913). Hierarchia catholica, Tomus 1 (second ed.). Münster: Libreria Regensbergiana. p. 160. (in Latin)
- Eubel, Conradus, ed. (1914). Hierarchia catholica, Tomus 2 (second ed.). Münster: Libreria Regensbergiana. pp. 115–116.
- Gulik, Guilelmus (1923). Eubel, Conradus (ed.). Hierarchia catholica, Tomus 3 (second ed.). Münster: Libreria Regensbergiana. p. 100.
- Gauchat, Patritius (Patrice) (1935). Hierarchia catholica IV (1592–1667). Münster: Libraria Regensbergiana. pp. 145.
- Ritzler, Remigius; Sefrin, Pirminus (1952). Hierarchia catholica medii et recentis aevi V (1667–1730). Patavii: Messagero di S. Antonio. p. 139.
- Ritzler, Remigius; Sefrin, Pirminus (1958). Hierarchia catholica medii et recentis aevi VI (1730–1799). Patavii: Messagero di S. Antonio. p. 143.

=== Studies ===
- Aubry, Martine, ed. (1996). Fénelon, évêque et pasteur en son temps, 1695–1715. Actes du colloque, Cambrai, 15–16 septembre 1995 (in French). Villeneuve d'Ascq: Centre d'histoire de la région du Nord et de l'Europe du Nord-Ouest, Université Charles de Gaulle-Lille 3. ISBN 978-2-905637-29-1.
- Destombes, Cyrille Jean (1890). Histoire de l'église de Cambrai (in French). Vol. Tome I (to 1093). Lille: Desclée.
- Destombes, Cyrille Jean (1890). Histoire de l'église de Cambrai (in French). Vol. Tome II (1093–1561). Lille: Desclée.
- Destombes, Cyrille Jean (1891). Histoire de l'église de Cambrai (in French) (Tome III (1562–1802) ed.). Lille: Desclée.
- Fisquet, Honore (1864). La France pontificale (Gallia Christiana): Cambrai (in French). Paris: Etienne Repos.
- Glay, André-Joseph-Ghislain (1849). Cameracum christianum, ou histoire ecclésiastique du Diocèse de Cambrai (in French). Lille: Lefort.
- Maillard-Luypaert, Monique (2001). Papauté, clercs et laïcs: le diocèse de Cambrai à l'épreuve du grand schisme d'occident (1378–1417) (in French). Bruxelles: Publications Fac. St Louis. ISBN 978-2-8028-0142-9.
- Pierrard, Pierre (1978). Les Diocèses de Cambrai et de Lille (in French). Paris: Beauchesne. ISBN 9782701001760.
- Roger, Paul (2003). Histoire des cathédrales, abbayes, châteaux-forts et villes de la Picardie et de l'Artois (in French). Bouhet: Découvrance. ISBN 978-2-84265-206-7.
- Rouche, Michel (1982). Cambrai (in French). Lille: Presses universitaires de Lille. ISBN 9782859392017.
- Sainte-Marthe (OSB), Denis de (1725). Gallia Christiana, In Provincias Ecclesiasticas Distributa; (in Latin). Vol. Tomus tertius. Paris: Ex Typographia Regia.
- Société bibliographique (France) (1907). L'épiscopat français depuis le Concordat jusqu'à la Séparation (1802–1905). Paris: Librairie des Saints-Pères.
