= Hautmont Abbey =

Abbey in France

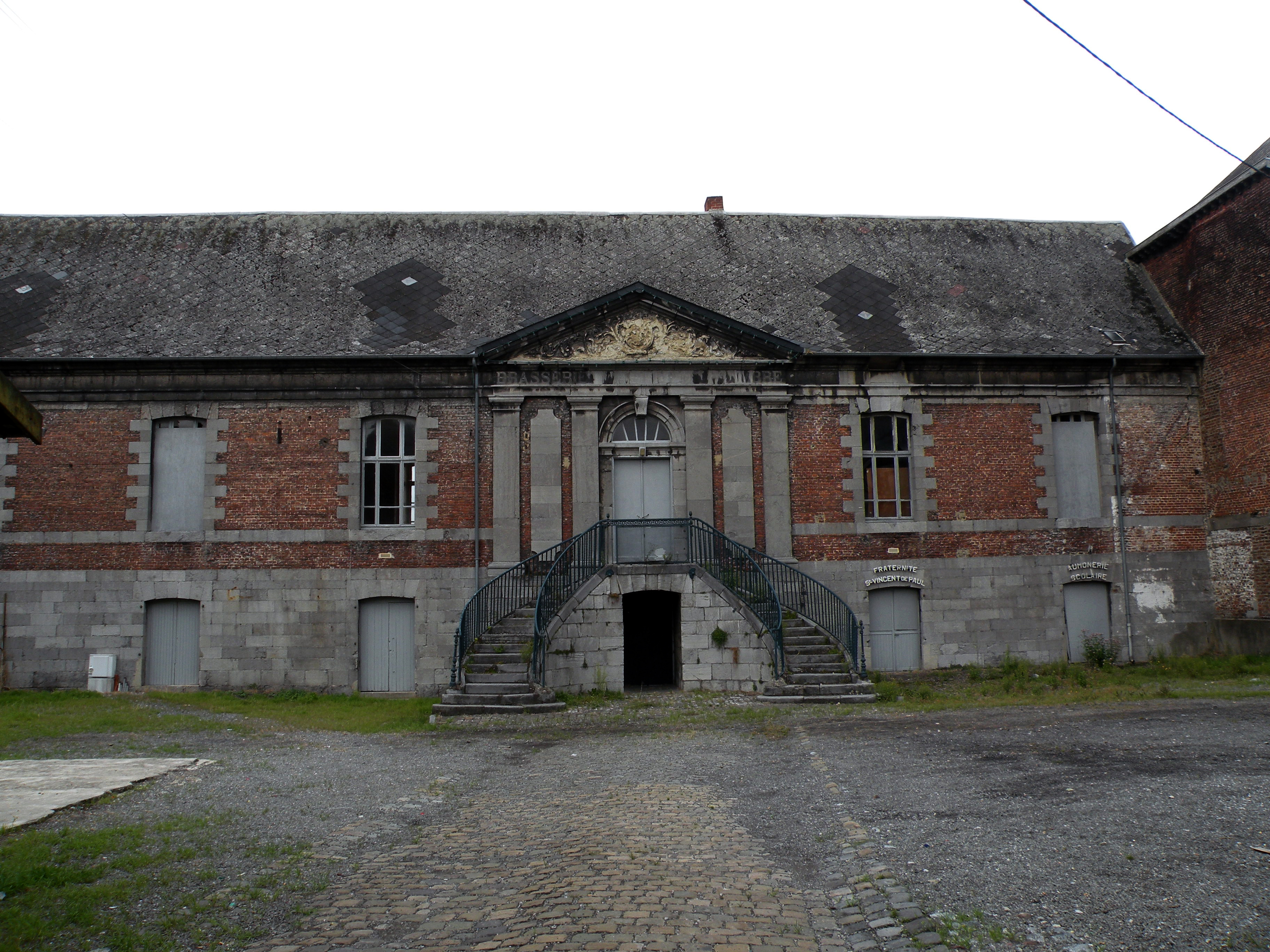
- Interactive map of Hautmont Abbey

Monastery information
- Other name: Abbaye d'Hautmont
- Order: Benedictine
- Dedication: Saint Peter
- Diocese: Roman Catholic Archdiocese of Cambrai

People
- Founder: Madelgaire

Site
- Location: Hautmont, Nord
- Country: France
- Coordinates: 50°15′3.4″N 3°55′13.3″E

Hautmont Abbey (French: Abbaye d'Hautmont) or the Abbey of Hautmont, was a Benedictine monastery in Hautmont in the department of Nord, France.

== History ==
=== Foundation ===
The Hautmont Abbey was originally in the pagus Hainoensis on the right bank of the Sambre, a few kilometres southwest of Maubeuge. The origins of the abbey lie in a religious community established in the 640s by Madelgaire who was the Count of Hainaut and husband of Saint Waltrude. During prayer or a dream in 642, Vincent received a divine inspiration instructing him to build a monastery on Hautmont, a hill above the Sambre. According to legend, it had snowed all night, but when he arrived, the snowy ground had a cross-shaped clearing where he built the monastery. Vincent Madegarius was the first Abbot of Hautmont. Endowing the abbey with vast resources, Vincent added several relics, including those of Saint Marcel, whom he allegedly sought from Pope Martin I in Rome. After overseeing the abbey for a period, he relocated to the forest on the border of Hainaut and Brabant where he constructed a convent that led to the establishment of the town of Soignies. Madelgaire passed on his position as abbot to Landry of Soignies around 660 AD, and subsequently, Halidulphe received the monastery in 675 AD. Halidulphe, in a 691 patent, granted his abbey over 100 villages and surrounding lands, meadows, and woods, with full rights and no possibility of future claims. Saint Ansbert was banished to the monastery of Hautmont-sur-Sambre by Pepin of Herstal.

The monastery was devastated and abandoned after the Normans and other barbarians destroyed it in 900, massacring several members of the clergy.

=== 11th Century ===
In the 1020s, Count Herman, married to Richilde of Hainaut, assumed control of Hautmont, granting it as a benefice to Arnould de Rumigny. His son Godefroi inherited it but, at his brother Gerard of Florennes' urging, expelled the clerics and handed it to Richard of Verdun. With Gerard's support, Emperor Folcuin secured the return of property from Godefroi, repaired the abbey, and restored the Benedictine rule. The abbey was taken over by the House of Avesnes in the 12th century. Gautier I, Count of Brienne, was the first to represent the family as solicitor of Hautmont and later Gautier II.

=== French Revolution ===
Amid the French Revolution, Hautmont Abbey's assets were nationalized, with its movable goods sent to Avesnes. The religious fled to avoid death, leaving the abbey deserted while the 1793 Reign of Terror resulted in widespread vandalism. The abbey's most valuable relics including those of Saint Marcel and Saint George were sent to the Mint in Lille on 14 February 1793.

== Gallery ==
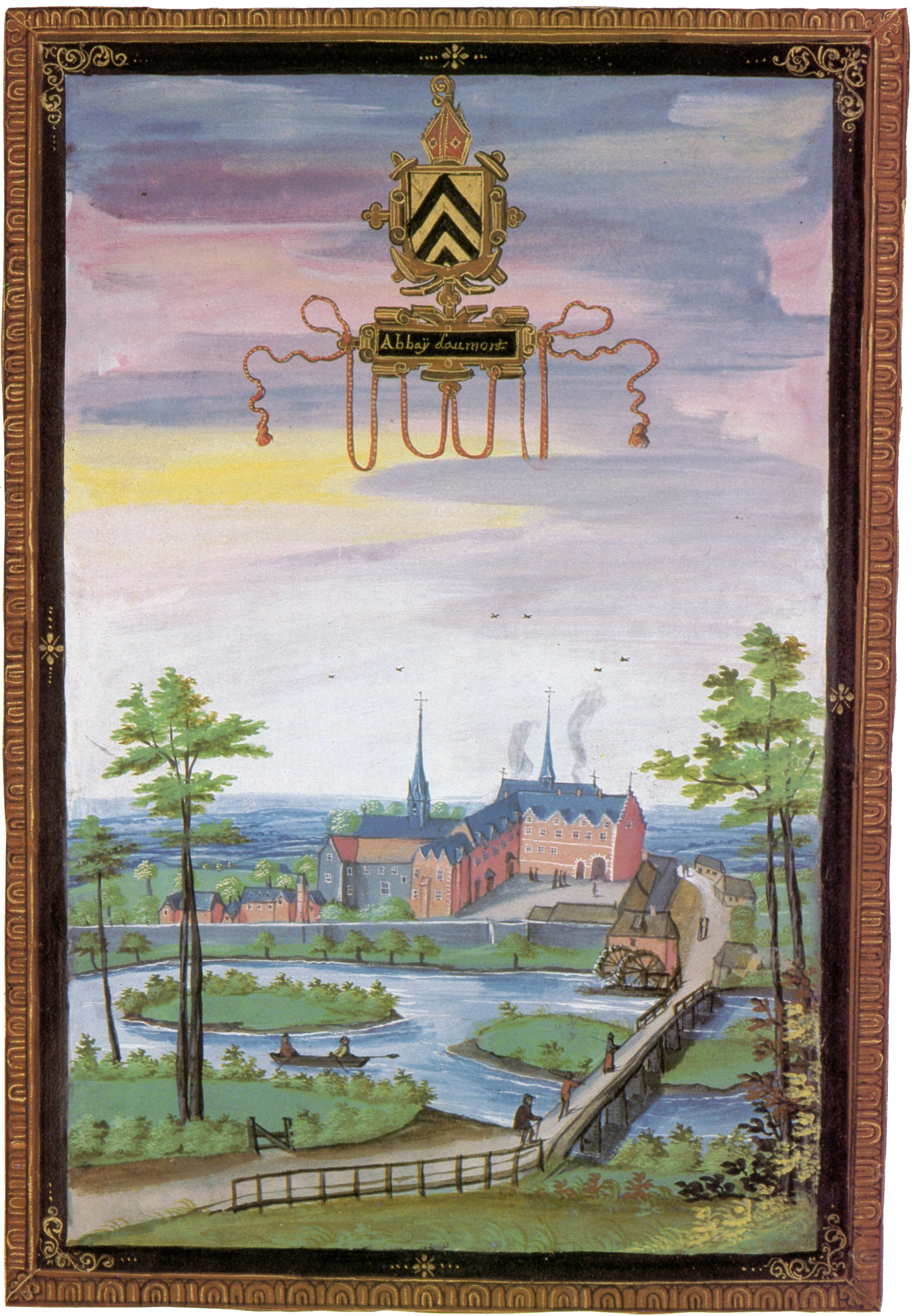
Abbaye d'Hautmont, 1598

== See also ==
Media related to Abbaye d'Haumont at Wikimedia Commons

- List of Merovingian monasteries
