= St Martin's Church, Cousolre =

St Martin Church, Cousolre
- Église Saint-Martin de Cousolre
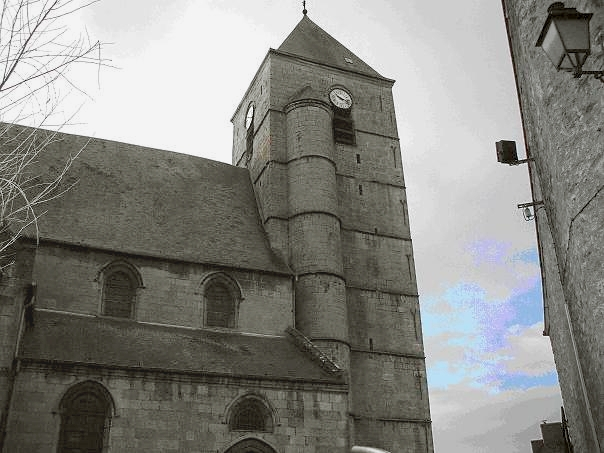
- Saint-Martin church in Cousolre
- St Martin Church, Cousolre
- 50.2452°N 4.1514°E
- Location: Cousolre
- Country: France
- Denomination: Catholic

History
- Founded: 16th century
- Dedication: Saint Martin

Architecture
- Style: Gothic architecture

Administration
- Diocese: Roman Catholic Archdiocese of Cambrai

Saint-Martin Church of Cousolre (French: Église Saint-Martin de Cousolre) or St Martin's Church of Cousolre is a church located in Cousolre, in the department of Nord, in the Hauts-de-France region of France.

== History ==
Built in the 16th century, the Church of Saint-Martin in Cousolre, once part of Hainaut (now in the arrondissement d'Avesnes), was dedicated to Saint Martin.

The relics of Saint Walbert and Saint Bertille were transferred to the Saint Martin church.

== Gallery ==
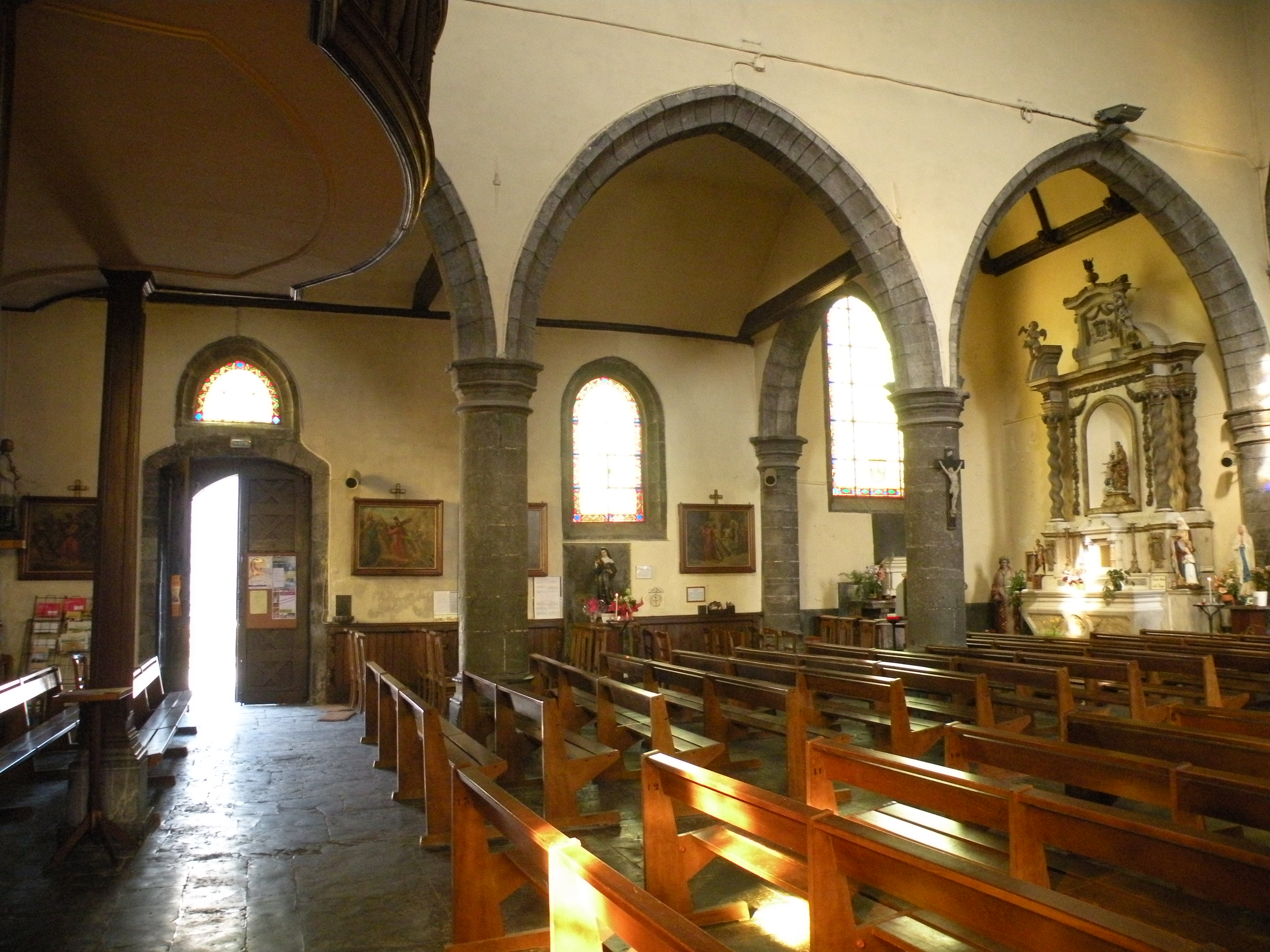

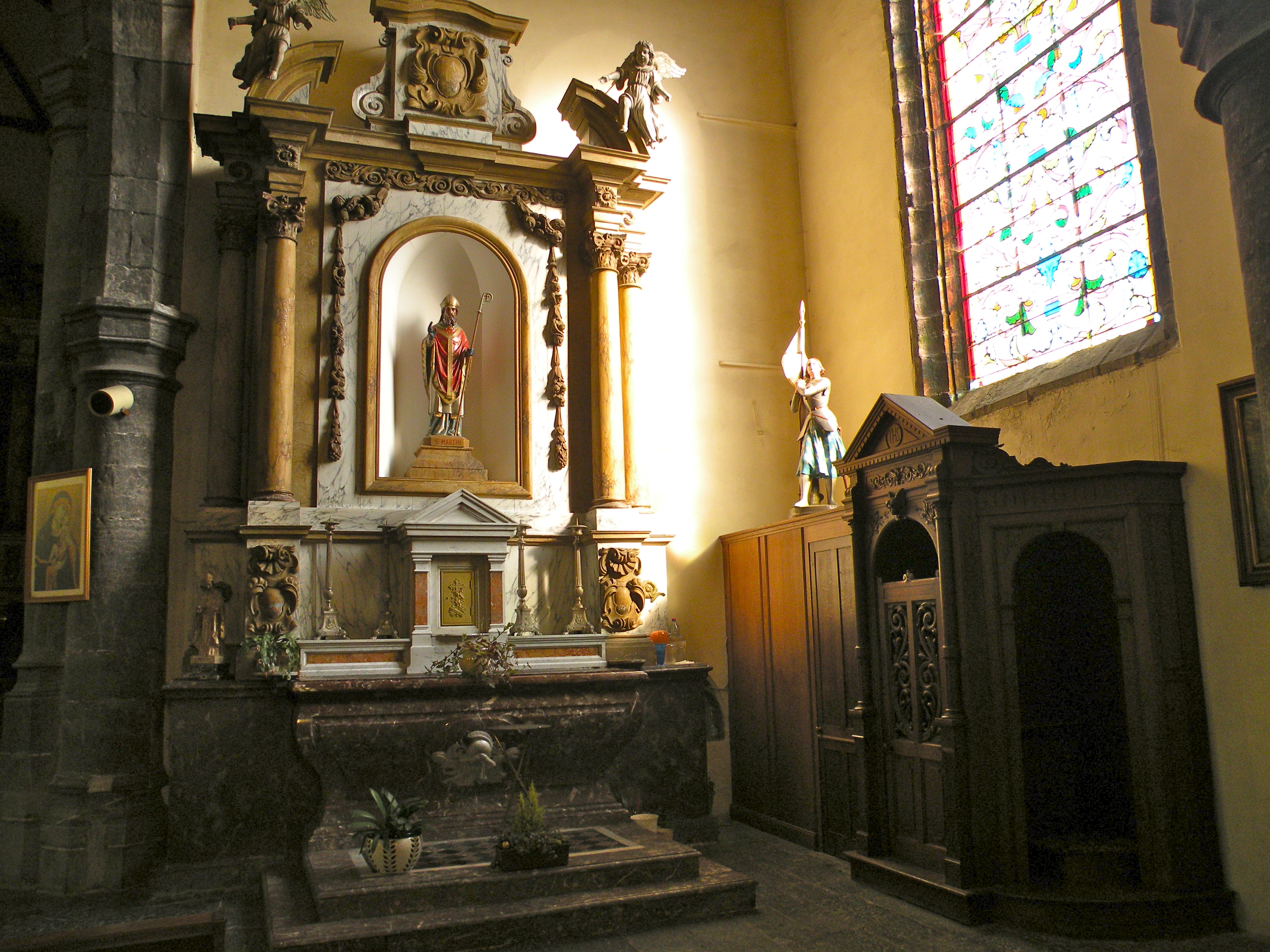

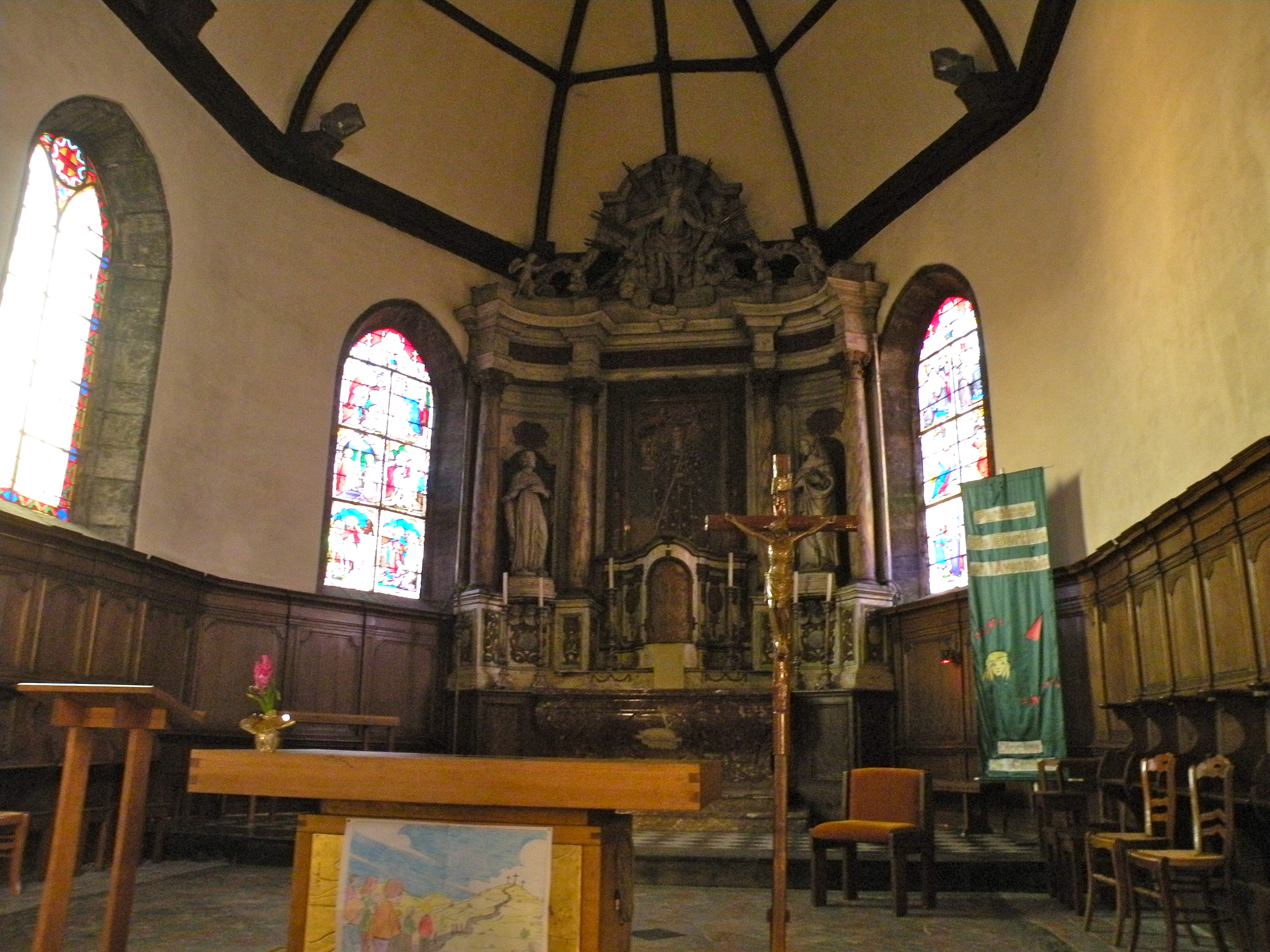

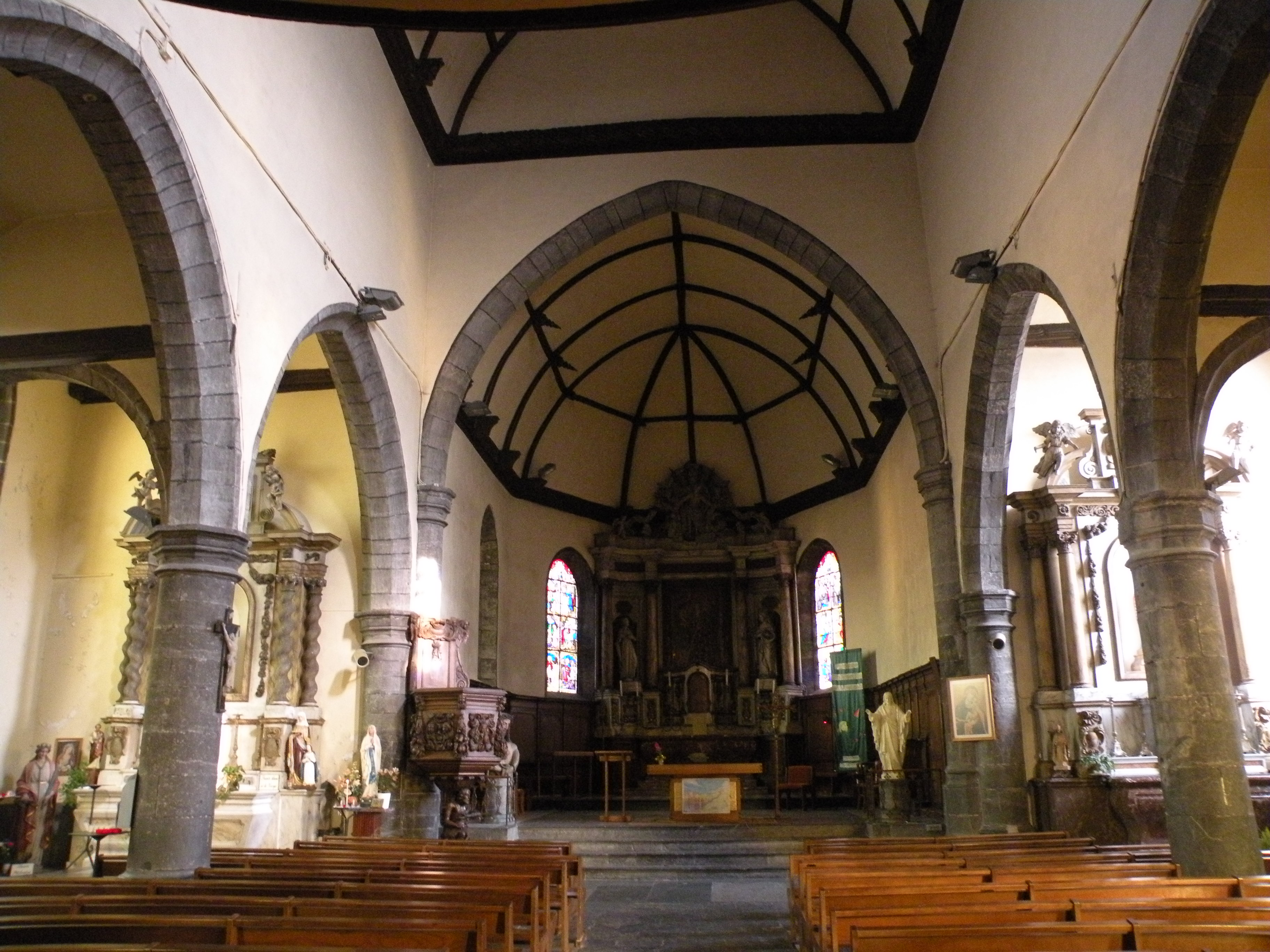

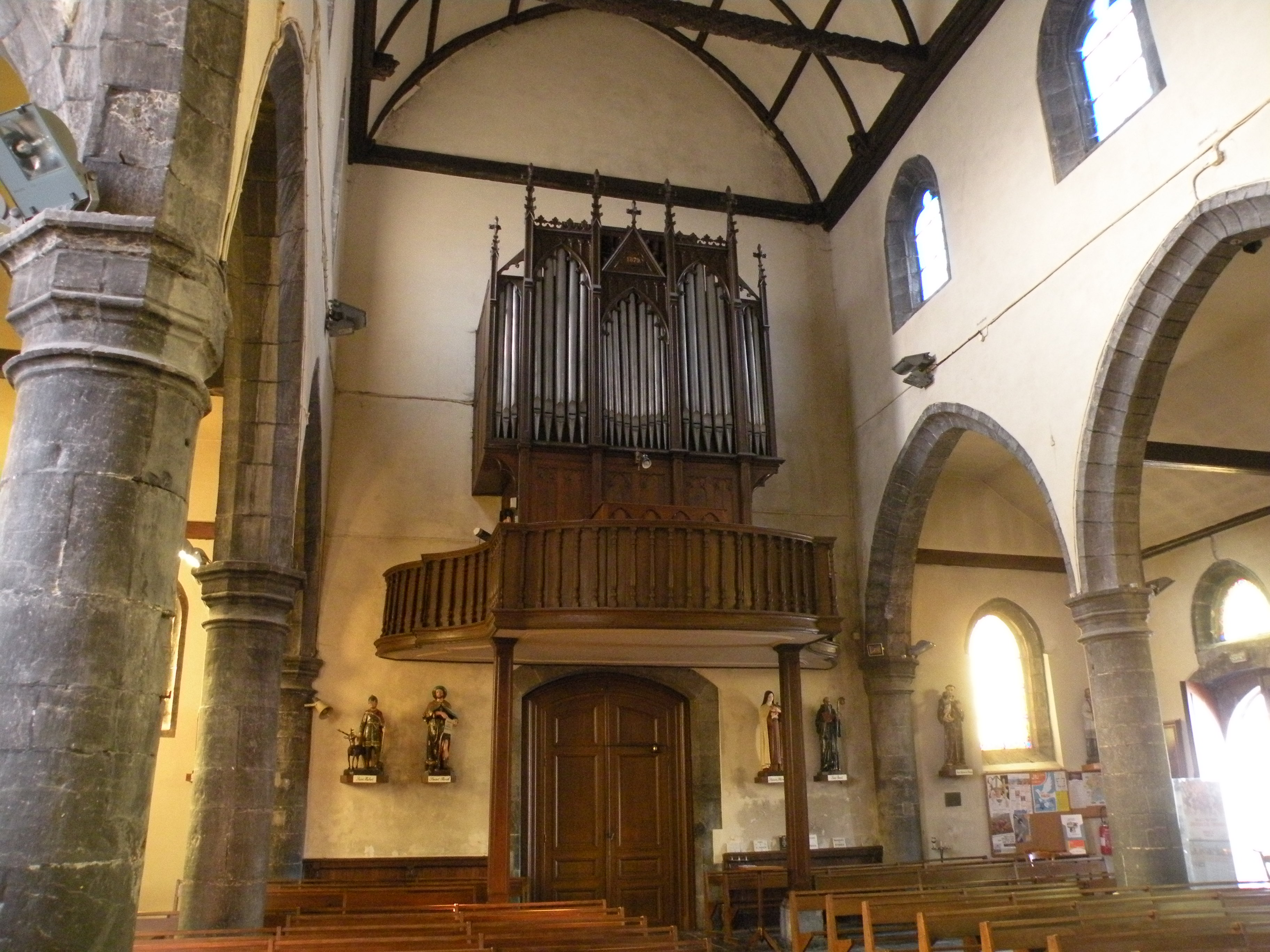

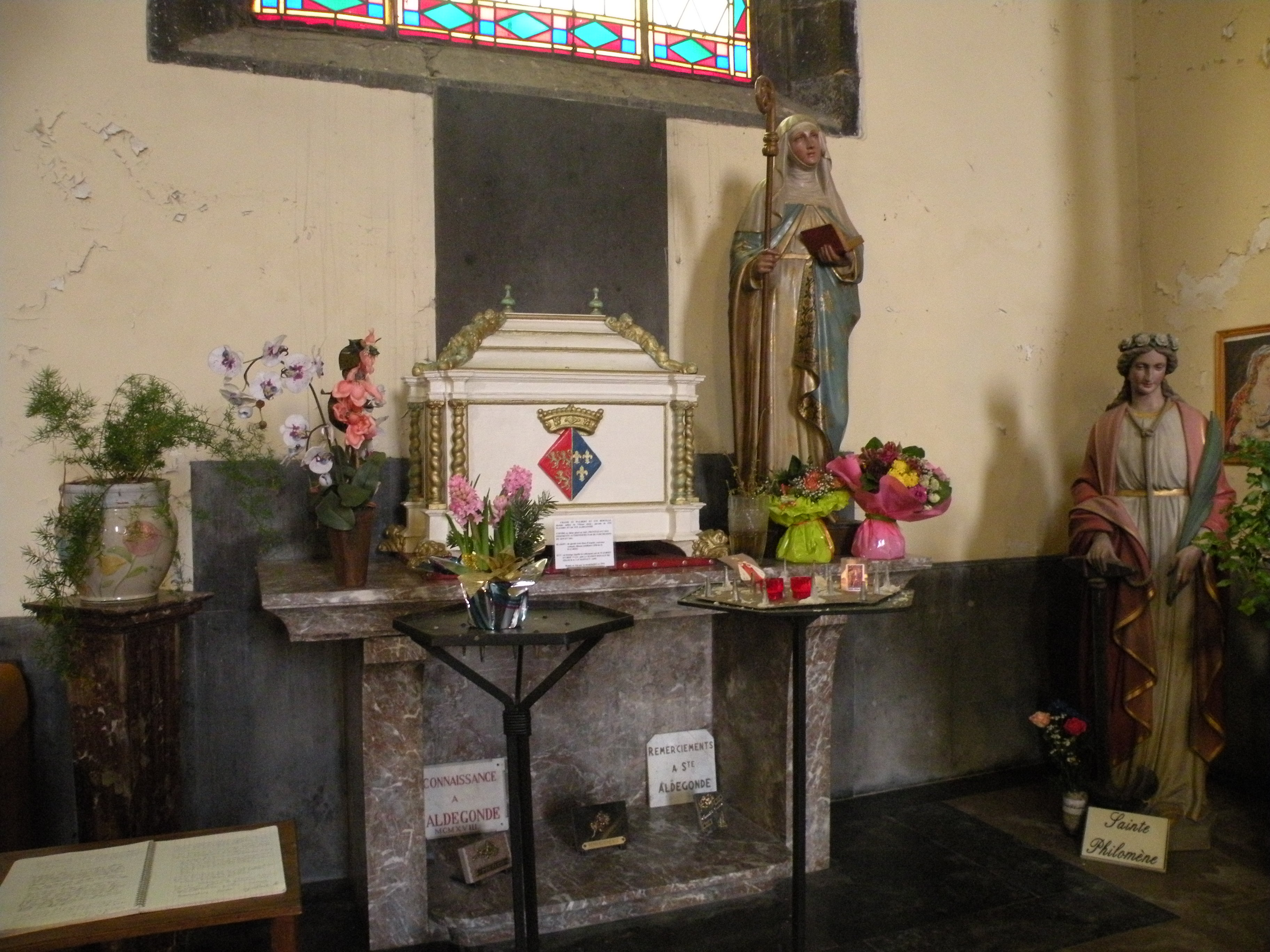

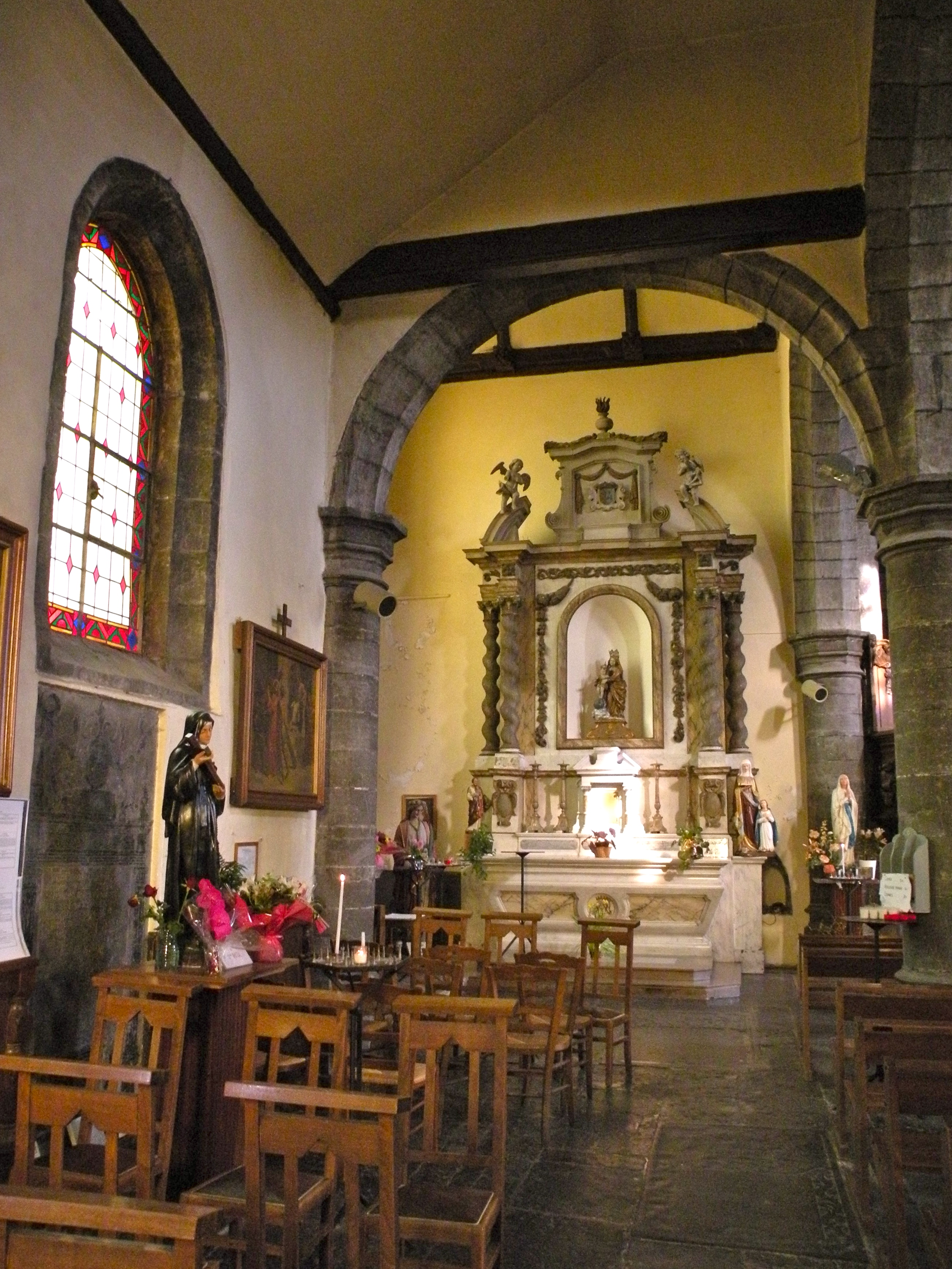

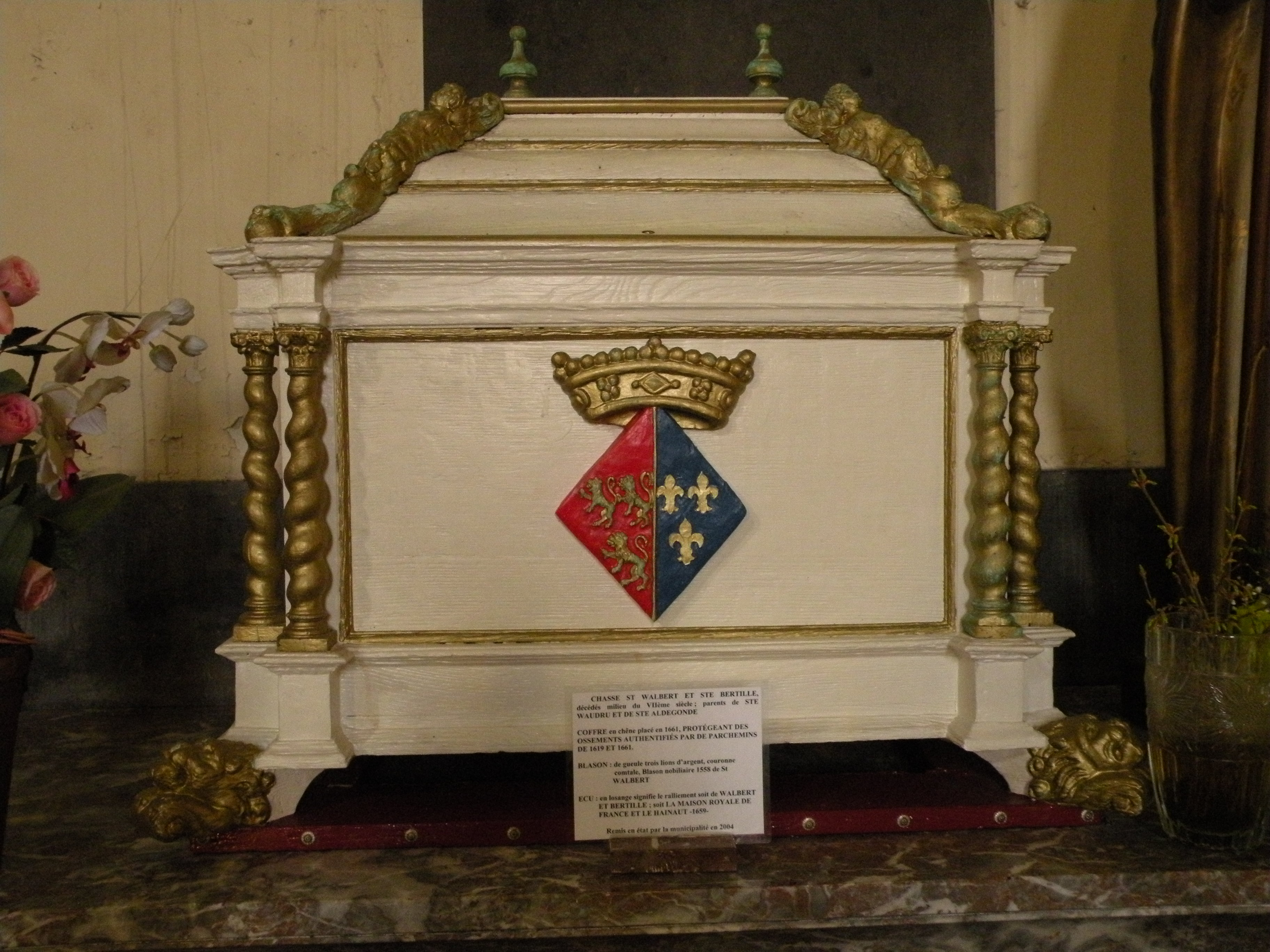
