= Saint Ghislain =

7th-century Belgian anchorite

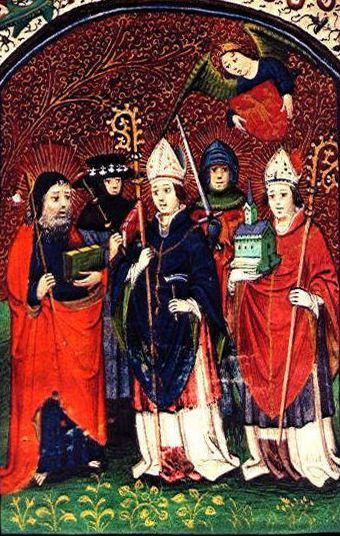
- Dutch Book of Prayers from the mid-fifteenth century. Ghislain is the figure on the far right, holding a church.
- Died: 9 October 680
- Venerated in: Roman Catholic Church; Eastern Orthodox Church
- Feast: 9 October
- Attributes: represented with a bear or bear's cub beside him
- Patronage: invoked against convulsions from children

Ghislain (died 9 October 680) was a confessor and anchorite in Belgium. He died at the town named after him, Saint-Ghislain.

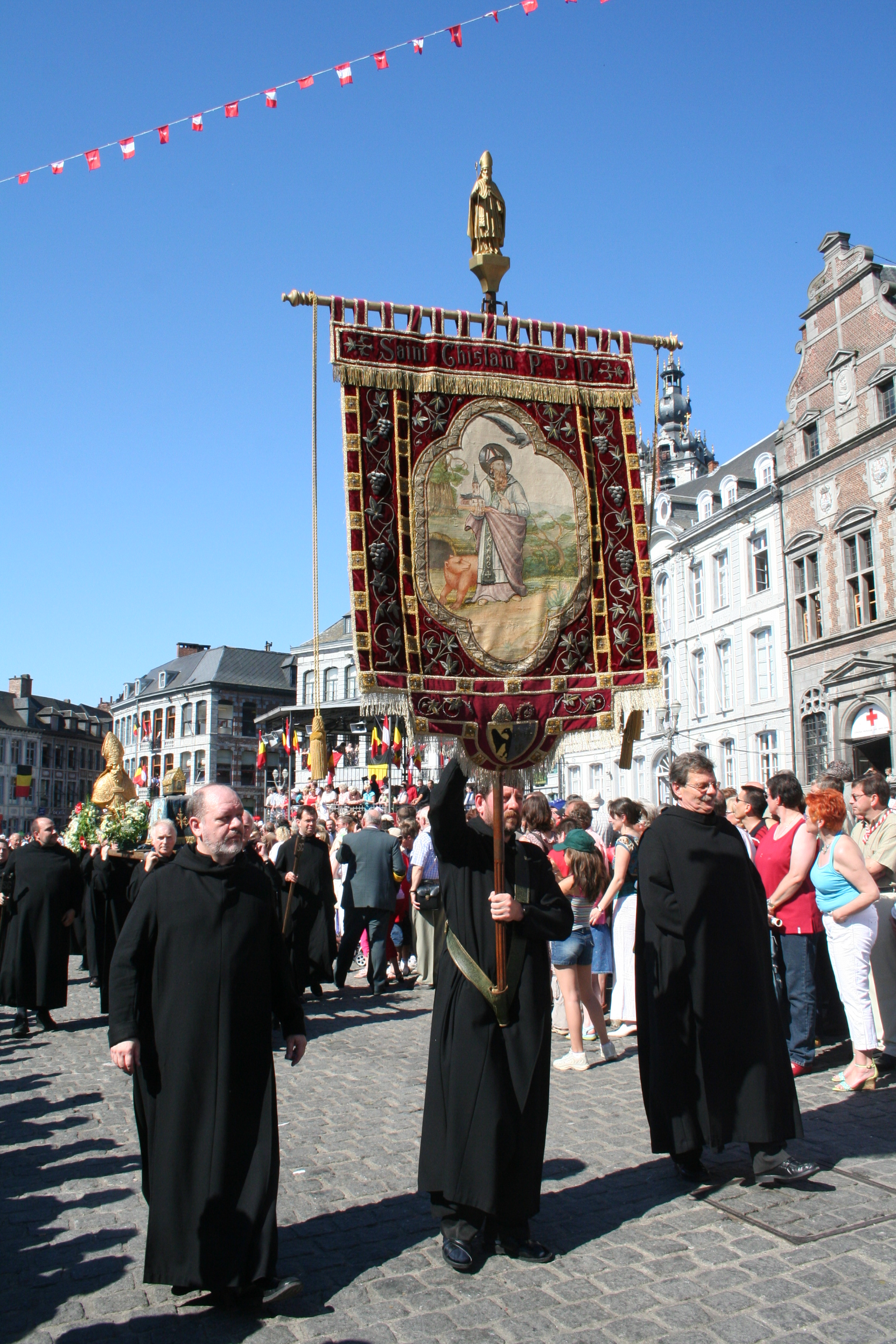
Group escorting the reliquary of Saint Ghislain during the Golden Chariot procession in Mons.

== Life ==
He was probably of Germanic origin. Ghislain lived in the province of Hainaut in the time of Amandus (d. 679) and Waltrude, Aldegonde, and Amalberga of Maubeuge. With two disciples, Lambert and Berler, he made a clearing in the vicinity of Castrilocus (now Mons, in Hainault), taking up later his abode at a place called Ursidongus, where he built an oratory or chapel dedicated to Peter and Paul the Apostle.

Aubert of Avranches summoned him to the episcopal presence in order to sound the intentions of this almost unknown hermit, but he afterwards accorded him efficient protection. During his visit to Cambrai, Ghislain spent some time in the villa of Roisin and received as a gift the estates of Celles and Hornu. He soon entered into relations with Waltrude, who was induced by him to build a monastery at Castrilocus, his former place of refuge.

It is probable that Ghislain influenced the religious vocation of Aldegonde, Abbess of Maubeuge, also of Amalberga and Aldetrude, of whom the first was the sister and the last two the daughters of Waltrude. One day Aldegonde in her monastery of Maubeuge, had a vision in which, according to her biographer, the death of Amandus, Bishop of Tongeren, was revealed to her. Ghislain visited her in her villa of Mairieu, near Maubeuge, and explained to her that the vision was an announcement of her own approaching death. The intercourse between Ghislain and Aldegonde brought about a perfect understanding between Maubeuge and the monastery founded at Ursidongus under Ghislain's direction. St. Waudru rewarded her counsellor with a portion of the villa of Frameries and of the oratory of Saint-Quentin, comprised within the boundaries of the villa of Quaregnon.

== Veneration ==
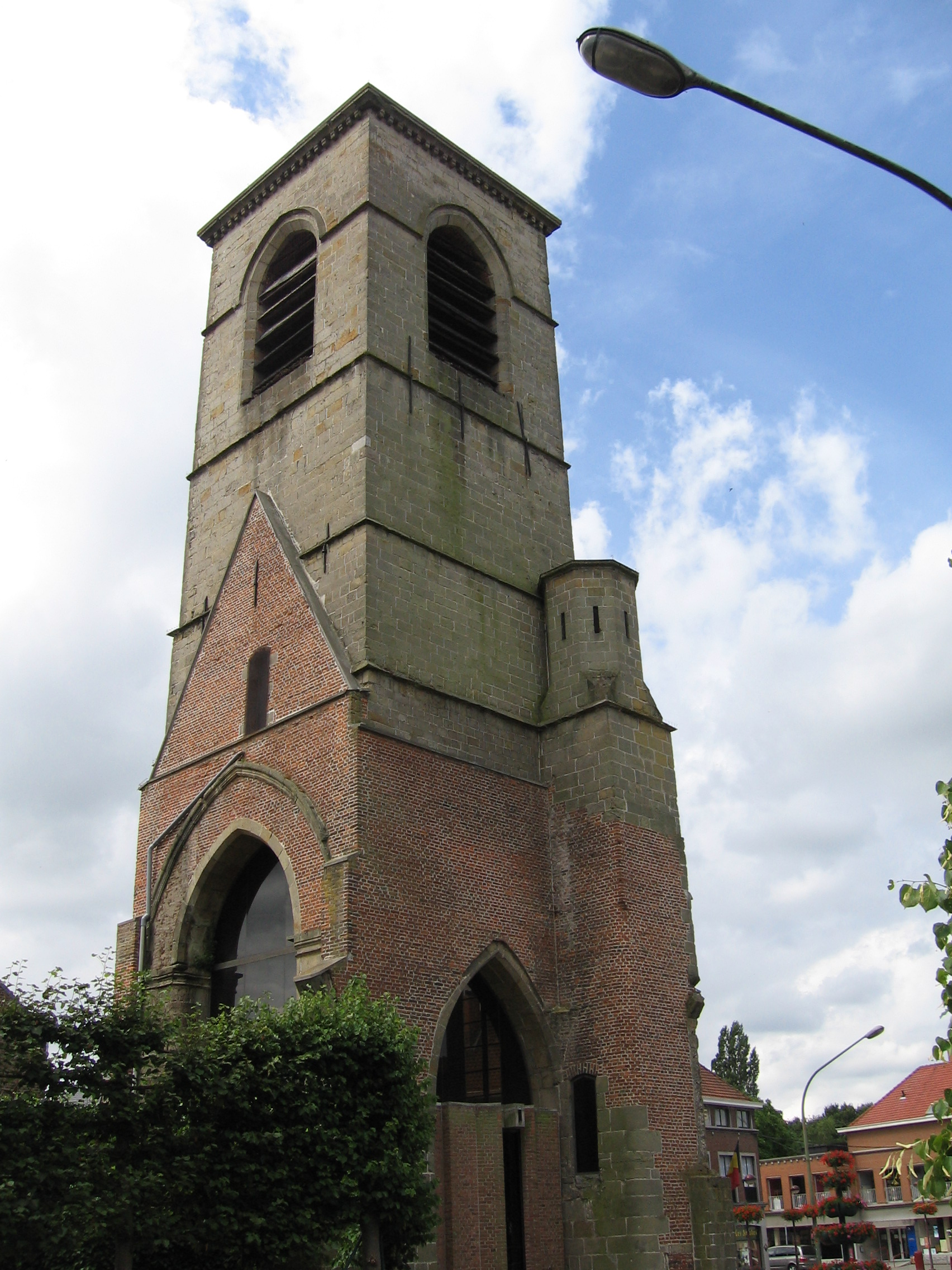
Tour St Martin, Saint-Ghislain

Ghislain died at Ursidongus, and the monastery which he had founded took his name. The relics of the saint were first disinterred c. 929. They were transferred to Grandlieu, near Quaregnon, about the end of the tenth century or the beginning of the eleventh, and in 1025 Gerard of Florennes, Bishop of Cambrai, removed them to Le Cateau-Cambrésis. They were visited several times in the course of the Middle Ages by the bishops of Cambrai.

In 1647 they were removed to St-Ghislain of which place he is patron. His feast is celebrated on 9 October and his intercession is sought to protect children from convulsions and epilepsy. In the old church of St. Martin in Saint-Ghislain there used to be an altar dedicated to St. Ghislain to which children suffering from epilepsy would be brought in hopes of a cure.

In iconography he is frequently represented with a bear or bear's cub beside him. This is an allusion to the popular legend which relates that a bear, pursued in the chase by King Dagobert I, sought refuge with Ghislain and later showed him the place where he should establish a monastery. Moreover, the site of his cella was called Ursidongus, "bear's den".

There is a Rue Saint-Ghislain/Sint-Gissleinsstraat in Brussels.

== See also ==
- List of Catholic saints
