= Collegiate Church of Saint Vincent (Soignies) =

Collegiate Church of Saint Vincent, Soignies
- Saint Vincent Collegiate Church of Soignies
- Collégiale de Saint-Vincent de Soignies
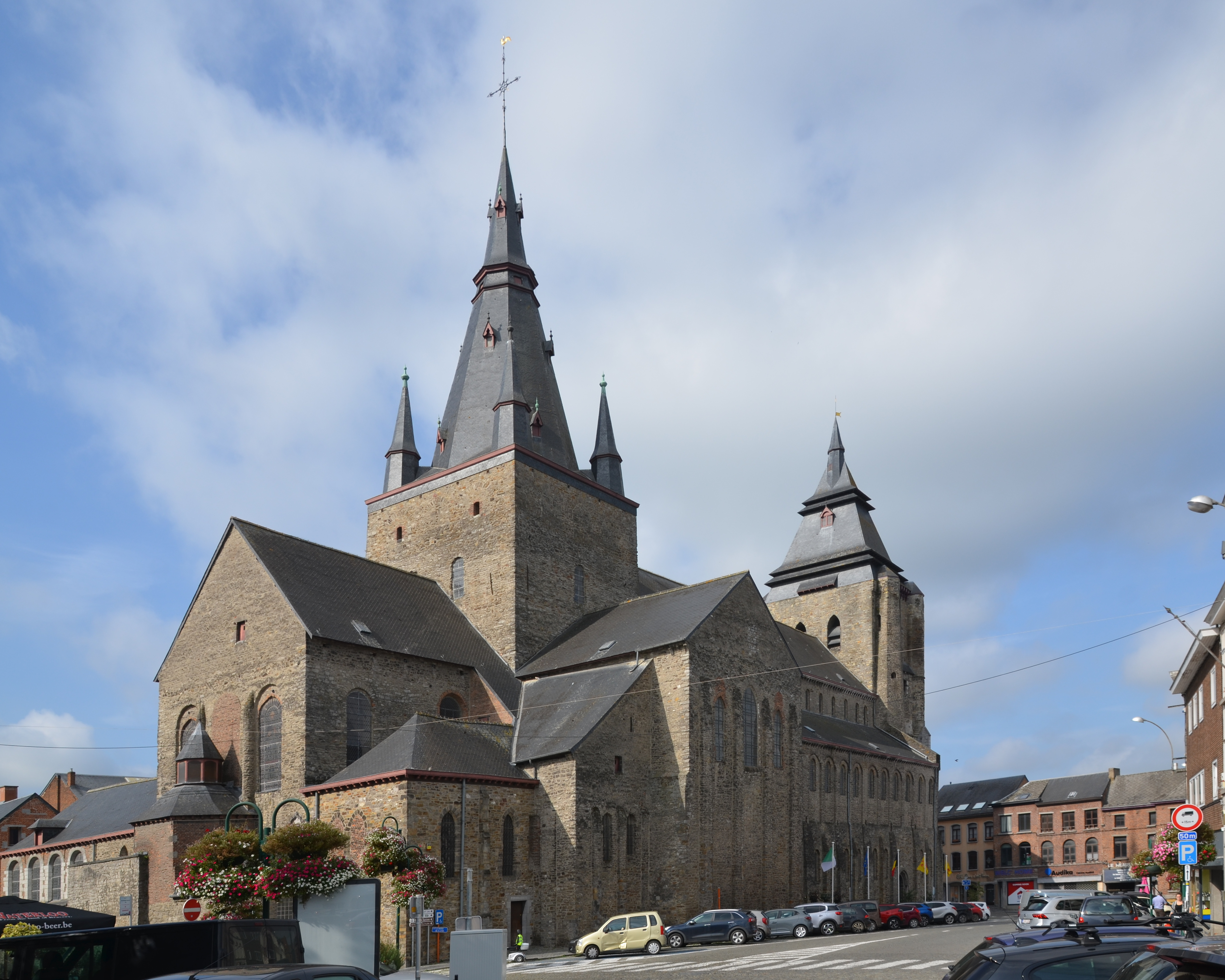
- Collegiate Church of Saint Vincent, Soignies
- 50°57′54″N 04°07′03″E
- Country: Belgium
- Denomination: Catholic

History
- Founded: 7th century
- Founder: Vincent Madelgarius
- Dedication: Saint Vincent

Collegiate Church of Saint Vincent (French: Collégiale Saint-Vincent de Soignies) or Saint Vincent Collegiate Church of Soignies is a church located in Soignies, Hainaut Province in Belgium.

== History ==
The Church of Saint Vincent was established as a Benedictine monastery in the forests of Soignies, in the pagus Hainonensis (now Hainaut Province) by Vincent Madelgarius. The monks who entered the monastery adhered to the order of St. Benedict. Vincent was later buried in the monastery of Soignies. Norman attacks led to the ruin of churches and monasteries in Hainaut.

The Saint Vincent Collegiate Church in Soignies was restored in the 11th century. The abbey was rebuilt and changed to a college (or chapter) of secular canons by St. Bruno, Archbishop of Cologne, a place which was in the diocese of Cambrai, the metropolis of Rheims. He instituted prebends, imposed the rule of Saint Augustine on the canons, and had them granted privileges from both the emperor and pope. Following the repair of the church and cloister, he granted them lands and revenues in Germany.

== Gallery ==
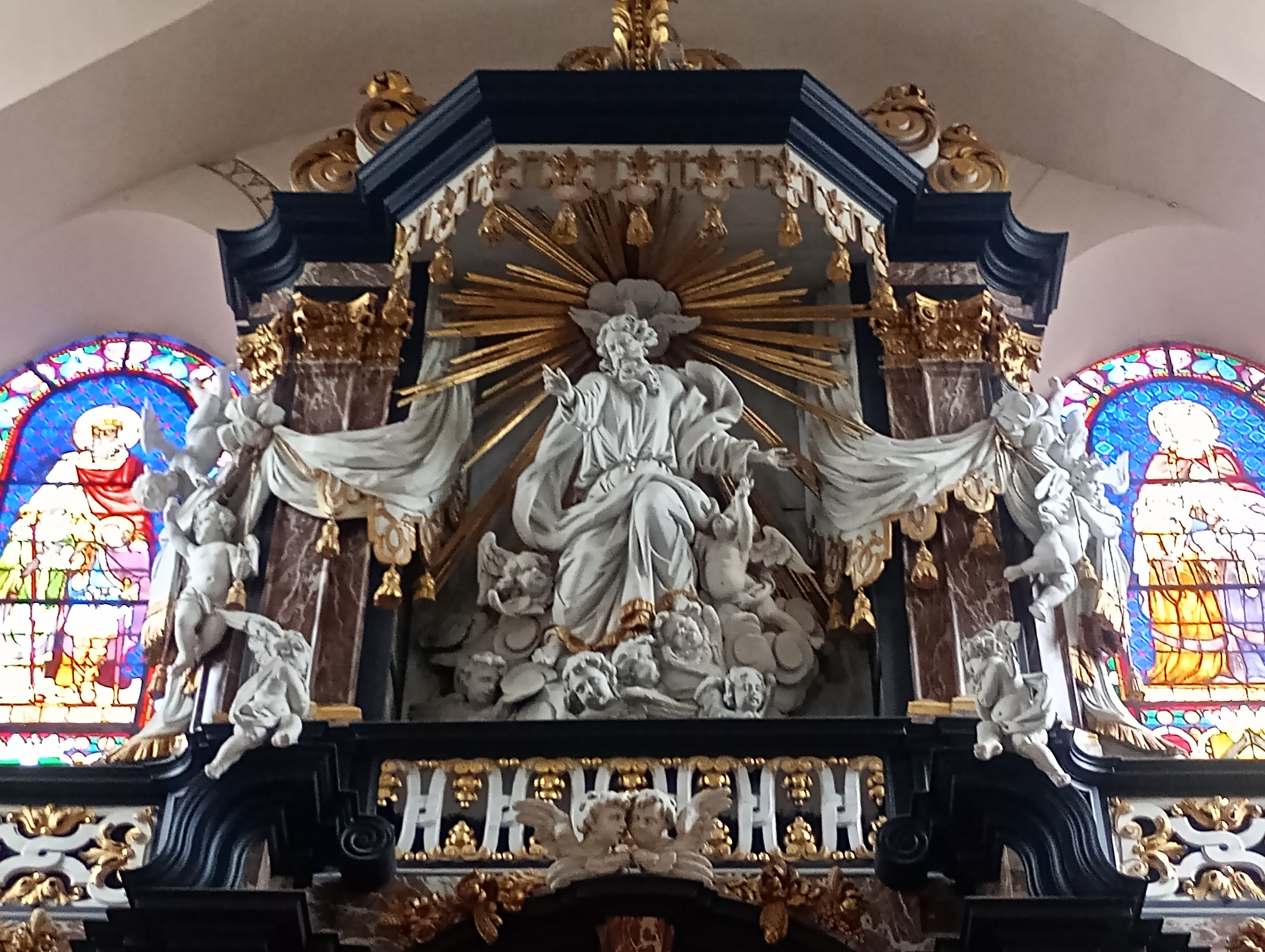

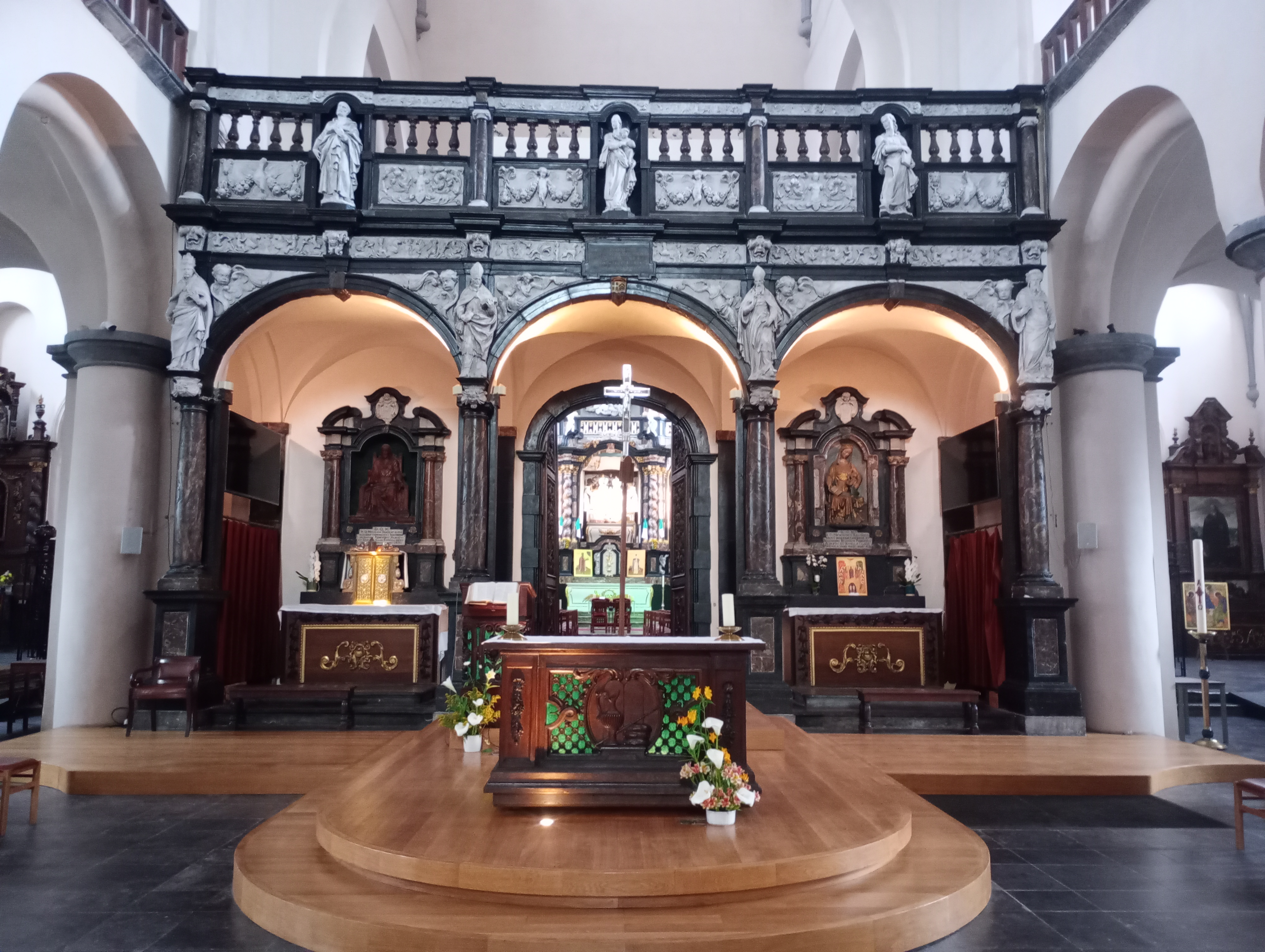

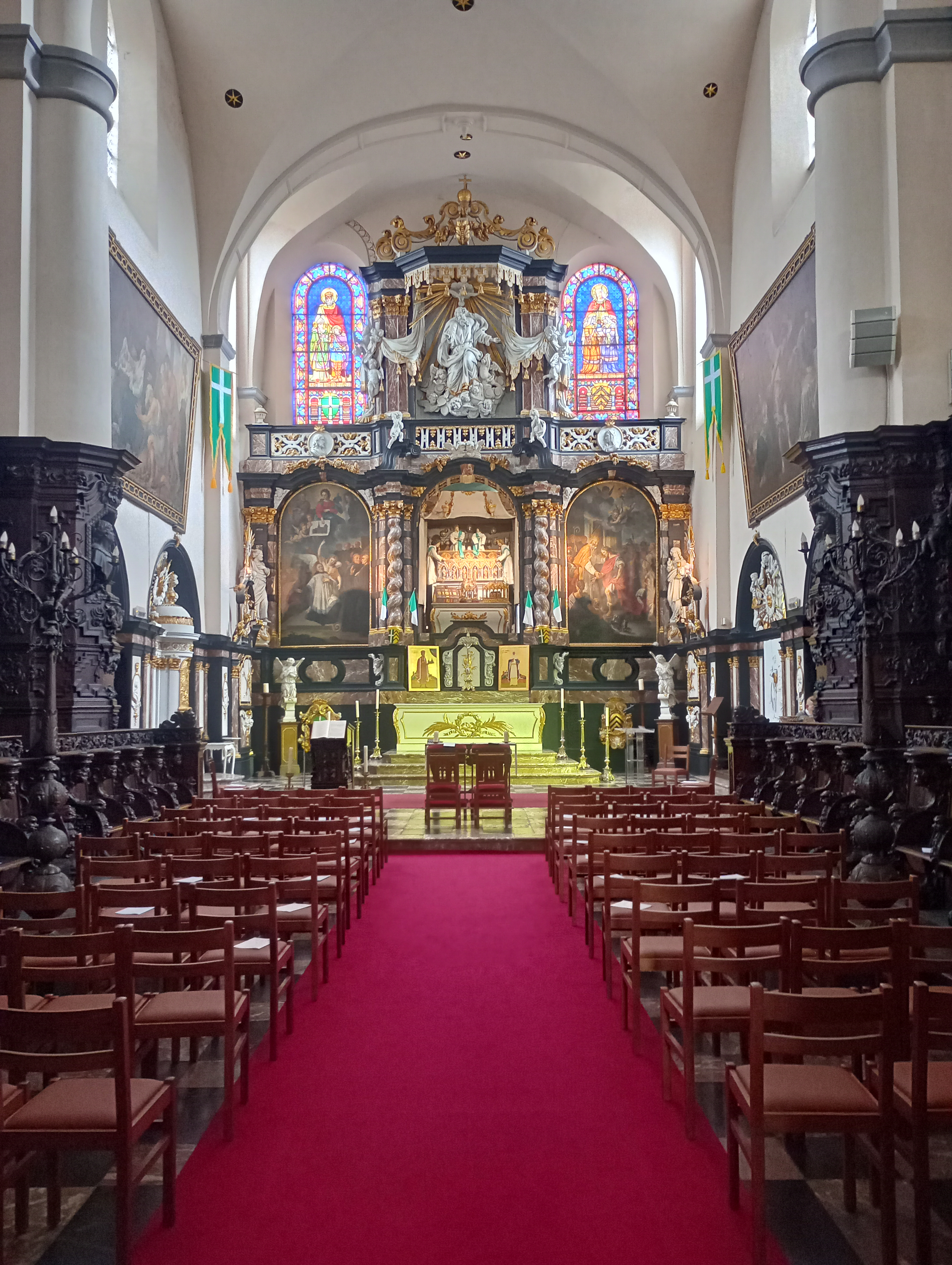

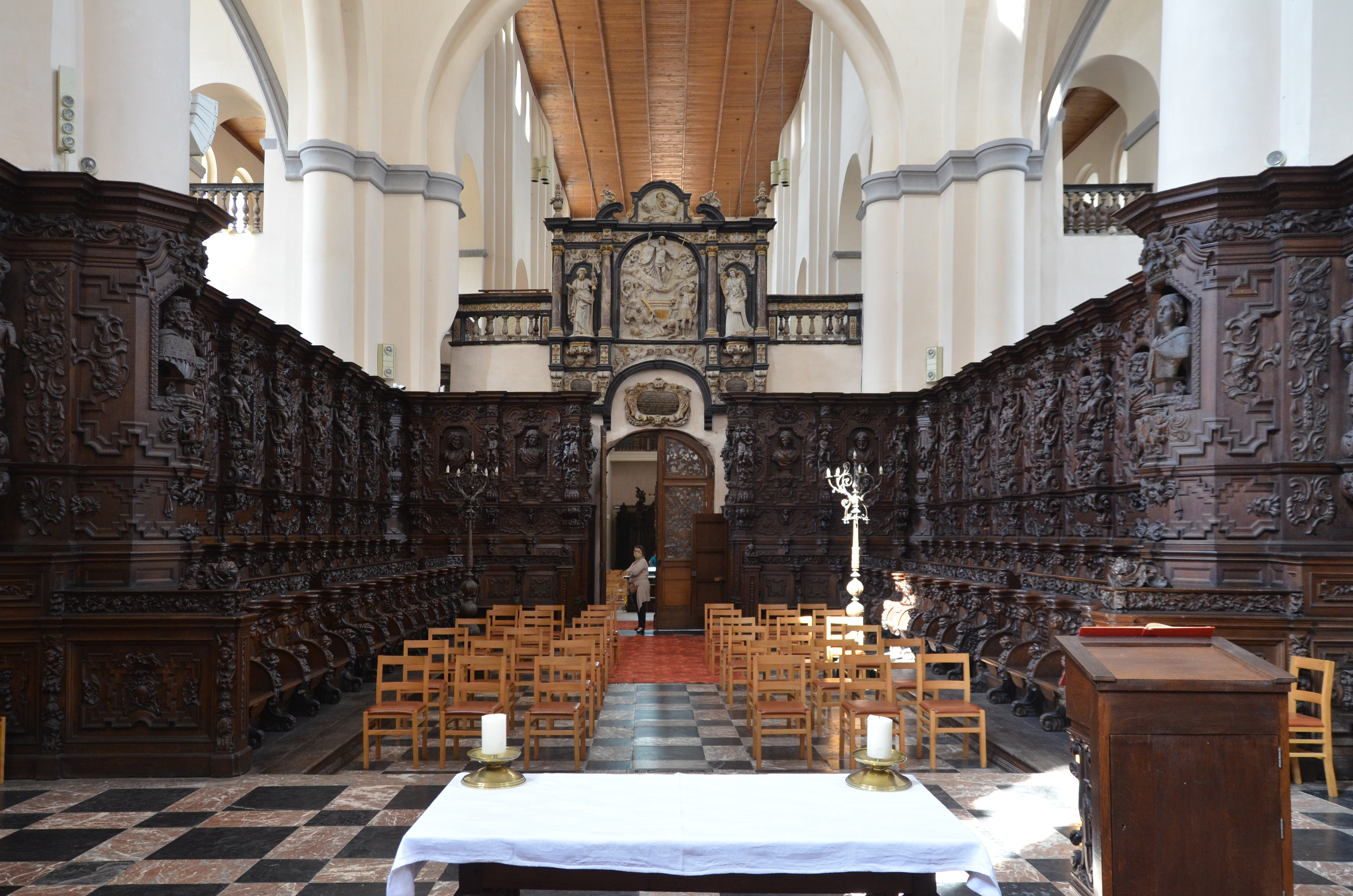
