= Waltrude =

Belgian saint (612–688)

Saint Waltrude
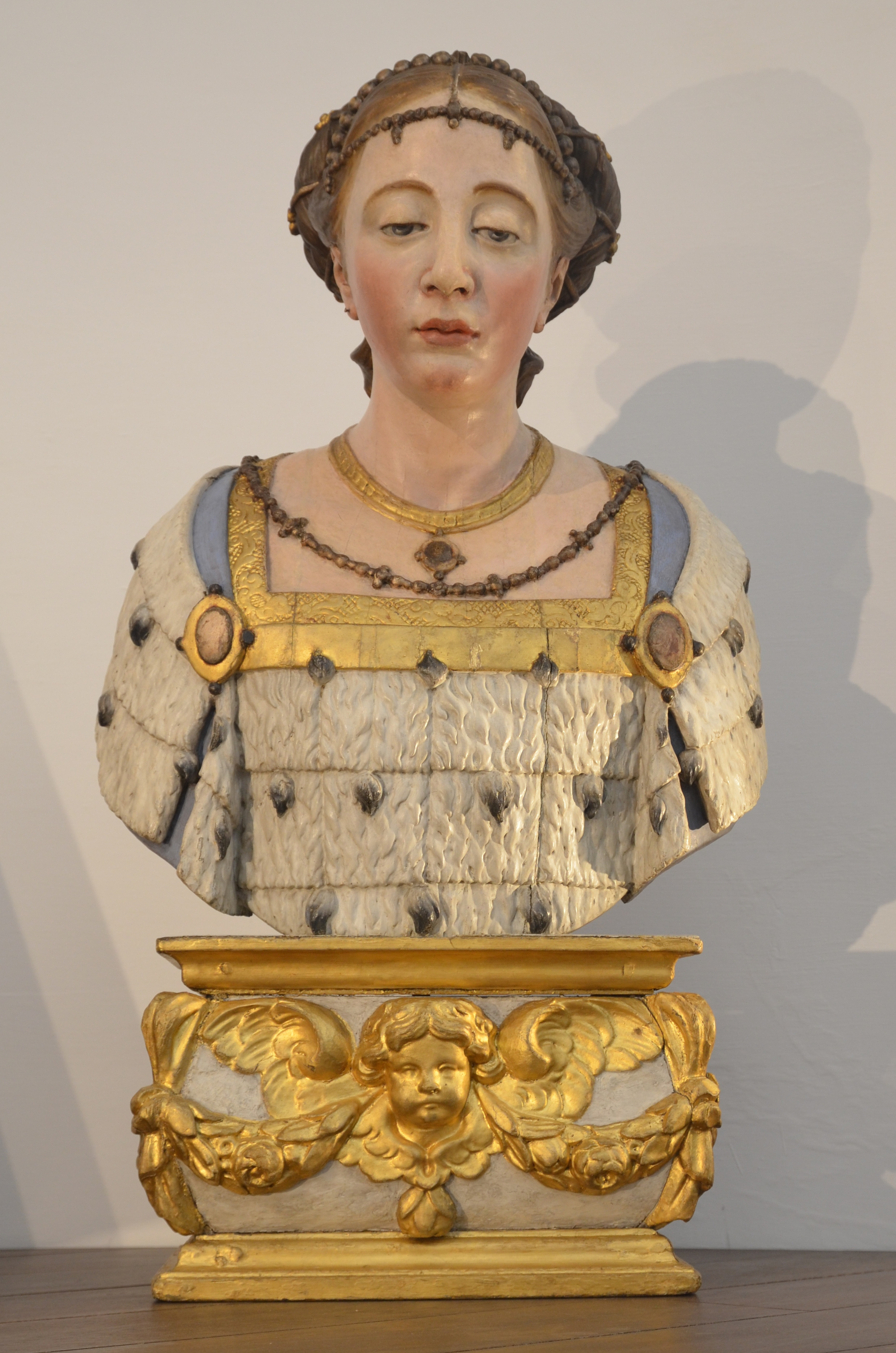
- Born: 6 march 610; Cousolre, France
- Died: 9 april 688 (aged 78); Mons, Belgium
- Venerated in: Roman Catholic Church; Eastern Orthodox Church
- Major shrine: Saint Waltrude Collegiate Church, Mons
- Feast: April 9
- Patronage: Mons

Saint Waltrude (French: Waudru; Dutch: Waldetrudis; German: Waltraud; Latin: Valdetrudis, Valtrudis, Waltrudis; died April 9, c. 688 AD) is the patron saint of Mons, Belgium, where she is known in French as Sainte Waudru, and of Herentals, Belgium, where she is known in Dutch as Sint-Waldetrudis or -Waltrudis. Both cities boast a large medieval church that bears her name.

== Life ==
Waltrude was born in Cousolre in northern France, to a wealthy and influential noble family. According to Alban Butler, she was a sister to Aldegonde, foundress of Maubeuge Abbey. She was also cousin to Saint Aye.

Waltrude married Vincent Madelgarius, the Count of Hainault. They had four children:

- Aldetrude, abbess of Maubeuge Abbey
- Landry of Soignies, Roman Catholic Bishop of Metz
- Madelberte of Maubeuge, succeeded Aldetrude as abbess of Mauberge
- Dentelin of Mons

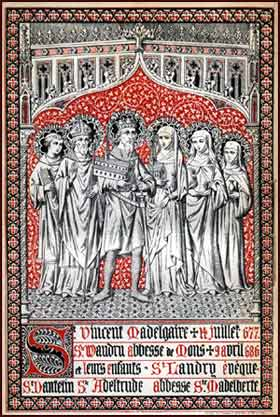
St. Waltrude and family

Around 642 Madelgarius founded the monastery known as Hautmont Abbey. Waltrude persuaded Saint Ghislain to establish an oratory at a place called Ursidongus, now known as Saint-Ghislain. The city of Mons grew around it.

Around 656, after the death of the young Dentelin, the couple decided to separate and retire to separate monasteries. Madelgarius went to Hautmont, where he became a Benedictine monk. Hydulphe of Hainault, husband of her cousin Aye, built her a cell and chapel near Ghislain's oratory. She was sometimes visited by her sister Aldegonde of Maubeuge.

Her biography celebrates her for "the pious intention under vow to free captives. She arranged the ransom price [pretium], weighed out the silver. ... When the captives had been bought back with the ransom money out of her own purse, at her command they returned to their families and homes."

== Veneration ==
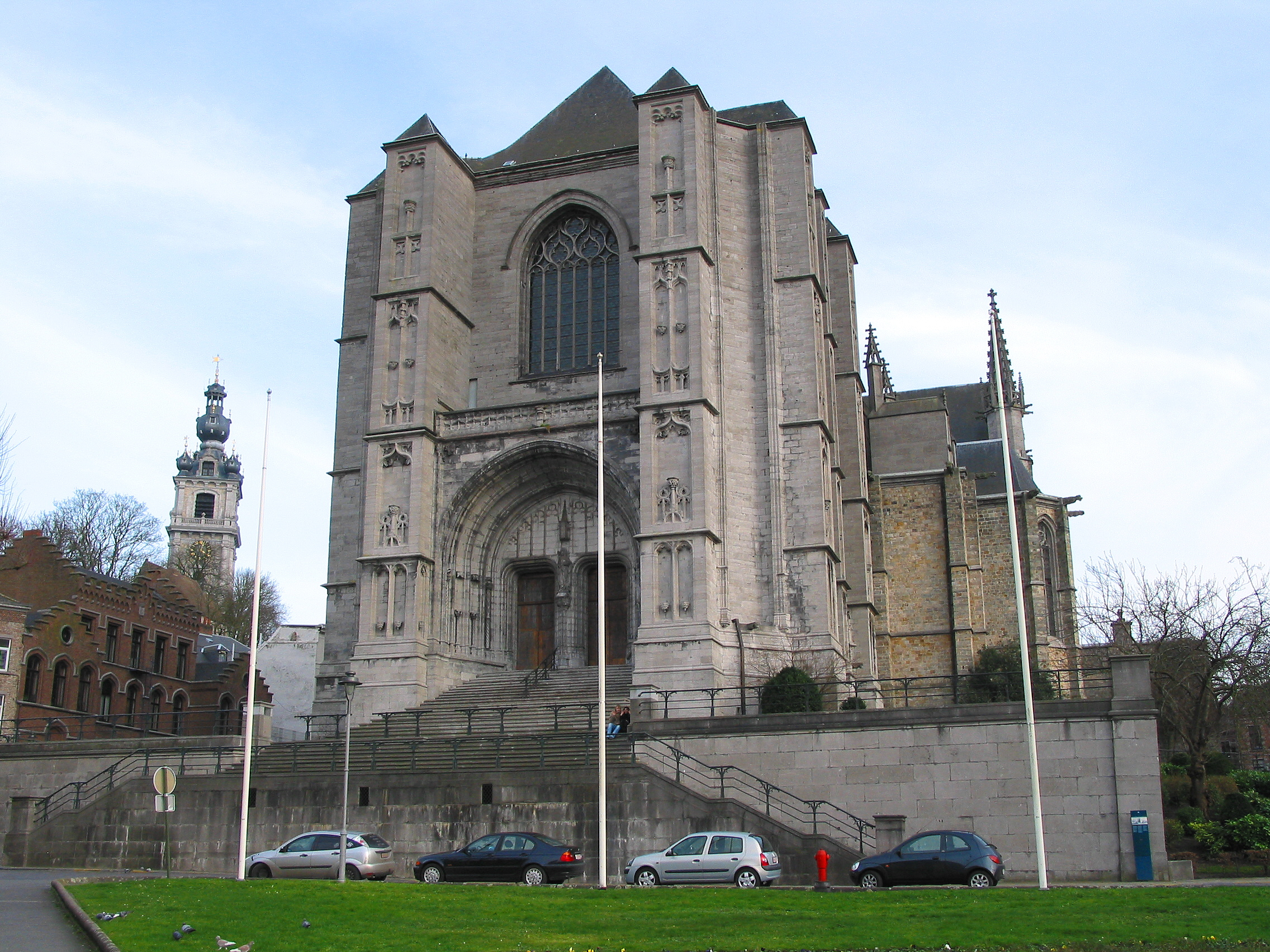
Saint Waltrude Collegiate Church and the Belfry of Mons

Upon her death, established by tradition as falling on 9 April 688, Waltrude was proclaimed holy by the vox populi. Waltrude is the patron saint of the city of Mons.

The shrine of Saint Waltrude is kept in the Saint Waltrude Collegiate Church in Mons. Each year, as part of the Ducasse de Mons festival, the shrine is placed on the car d'or, a gilded cart, and drawn by horses through the city streets.

Both her parents (Walbert IV and Bertille) and her sister (Aldegund) were canonized. Her four children were also declared saints (Landericus, Dentelin, Aldetrude, and Madelberte) as was her husband (Madelgaire).
