= Vincent Madelgarius =

Saint Vincent Madelgarus
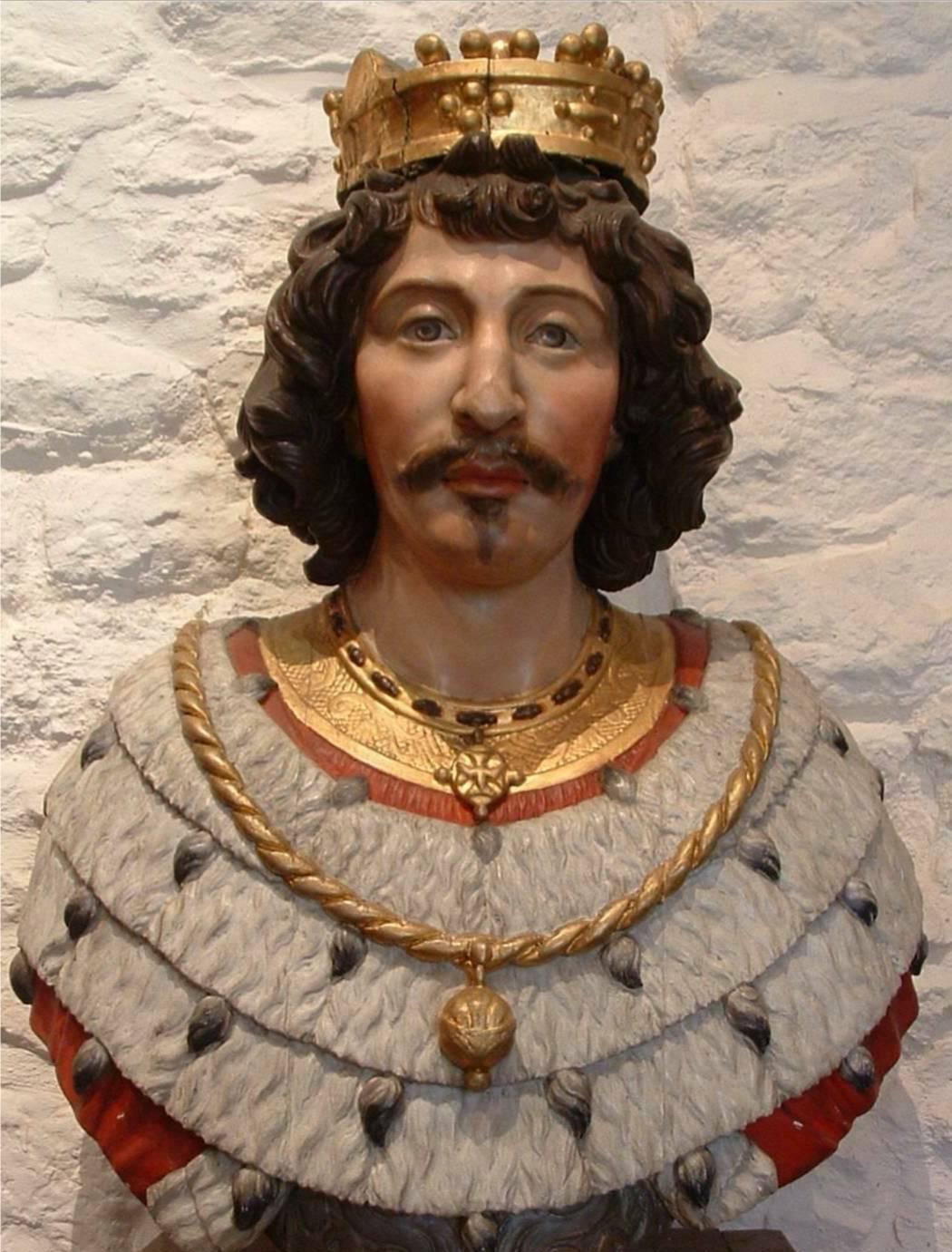
- Died: 677 AD
- Venerated in: Roman Catholic Church; Eastern Orthodox Church
- Feast: September 20

Vincent Madelgarius, aka Maelceadar, Benedictine monk, died 677. His feast day is September 20.

== Belgian accounts ==
Belgian sources state that Madelgarus was born about 615 in Strépy, Belgium.

The young nobleman married around 635 the distinguished and saintly Waltrude. Her father Walbert IV was related to the Frankish royal house, and her mother was Saint Bertilia. Together they lived a life characterized by piety and good deeds. They had four children, two sons and two daughters, all of whom are counted among the saints: Landericus, Madelberta, Aldetrudis and Dentelin.

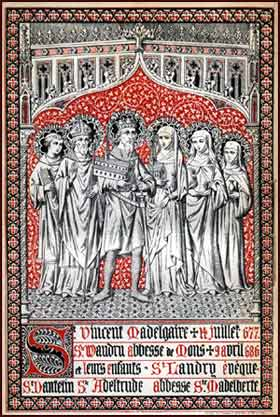
St. Vincent and Family

Shortly after his marriage, Madelgarus was sent by Dagobert I to Ireland. He is said to have returned with many missionaries from Ireland.

Madelgarius founded two monasteries, first around 642 in Hautmont in French Hainault. According to an eleventh century Life of St. Vincent Madelgarius, Madelgarius had a dream in which an angel instructed him to build a church in honor of St. Peter, and marked the dimensions by dragging a reed behind him like a plow. The next day, Madelgarius found the plan of the church traced out upon the ground. This then was the beginning of the monastery at Soignies in Belgian Hainault, where he was the local governor. (O'Hanlon connects this story with the monastery at Hautmont.)

Around 656, after his fourth child Dentelin died aged just seven, the couple agreed to separate and go to separate monasteries. Waldetrudis retired to Mons, while Madelgarius moved to his monastery in Hautmont, where he became a Benedictine monk and took the name Vincent. He was clothed in the monk's garb by Saint Bishop Aubert of Cambrai.

Vincent's pious life and his fame as a spiritual counselor drew many of his former friends to the monastery, and they placed themselves under his spiritual guidance. Hoping to find greater seclusion, he moved around 670 with a few other monks to the second monastery, Soignies, where he became abbot. Shortly before his death, he passed the monastery on to his son, Bishop Landericus of Metz. He died on 14 July, most likely in the year 677, in Soignies.

== Irish accounts ==
Historian John Lanigan said Mauger was a distinguished Irish soldier in the service of Dagobert I. However, hagiographer John O'Hanlon concedes that while some Irish writers place Madelgarius's place of birth in Ireland, and others in Aquitaine, the consensus leans to his being from Hainaut. Vincent is sometimes known as Maelceadar (Mael Ceadar), or Mauger. He became greatly celebrated in military and state affairs. Madelgarius and Waltrude became known for their charitable care for the poor and helpless. Madelgarius was highly respected by the people he governed. He was friends with Saint Ghislain, and Amandus.

The claim that he was of Irish origin, which was asserted by Jean du Pont and some Irish writers, has been refuted by Jean Mabillon and the Bollandists.

== Veneration ==
In the 11th century, several centuries after Vincent Madelgarius' death, a vita was written about him. It is an example of the not uncommon medieval practice of borrowing from the biographies of other saints when writing about one of whom there was insufficient information. It has been characterized as "a pious patchwork". Stories of Vincent Madelgarius and his family have become entwined with much that is legendary.

He became the main patron saint of the town of Soignies, where there is a magnificent Romanesque basilica that bears his name. When the Normans invaded the area, his relics were relocated to Metz. A 13th-century casket containing his head was destroyed during the French Revolution, but it is possible that the relic was salvaged – it is said to be in a replacement casket made in 1803. His cult remains strong today and is celebrated at two major processions in Soignies each year, one on the day of his death, July 14, and the other on the Monday after Whitsunday. His memorial day is otherwise September 20.

St. Dentelinus is the patron saint of Rees, Germany.
