= Aldetrude =

Frankish saint

Saint Aldetrude
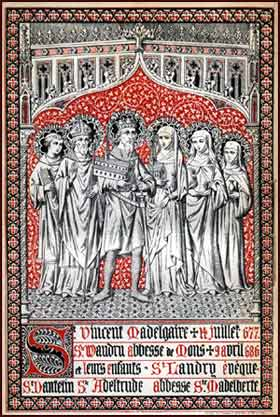
- Born: Aldetrude; Pagus of Hainoensis, Austrasia, Francia
- Died: c. 696; Maubeuge, Pagus of Hainoensis, Austrasia, Francia
- Venerated in: Roman Catholic Church
- Feast: 25 February

Aldetrude (died c. 696, or 526) was a Christian saint and from 684 was abbess of Maubeuge Abbey in the County of Hainault, now in northern France. She is also known as Aldetrude de Maubeuge, Aldetrude of Maubod, Aldetrudis and Adeltrude.

She was one of the four children of Saint Waltrude, also known as Waldetrude, and Saint Vincent Madelgarius. Her siblings were Saint Landericus, a Roman Catholic Bishop of Metz; Saint Dentelin who died very young; and Saint Madelberta, who was also abbess of Maubeuge.

Her aunt Aldegonde, her mother's sister, was the first abbess of Maubeuge; Aldetrude was sent into her care as a girl and then succeeded her, and her sister Madelberte was the third abbess.

She died and is celebrated on the 25 or 27 February. The exact year of her death is unknown though some sources say c. 696, and she is said to have lived to an advanced age.

In The Book of Saints: A Comprehensive Biographical Dictionary (2015), "edited ... on behalf of the Benedictine Monks of St. Augustine's Abbey, Chilworth" it is stated that "Her extant biography is unreliable" and "The revised Roman Martyrology has her 170 years earlier", giving a death date of 526.
