= Madelberte of Maubeuge =

7th-century nun

Saint Madelberte of Mauberge
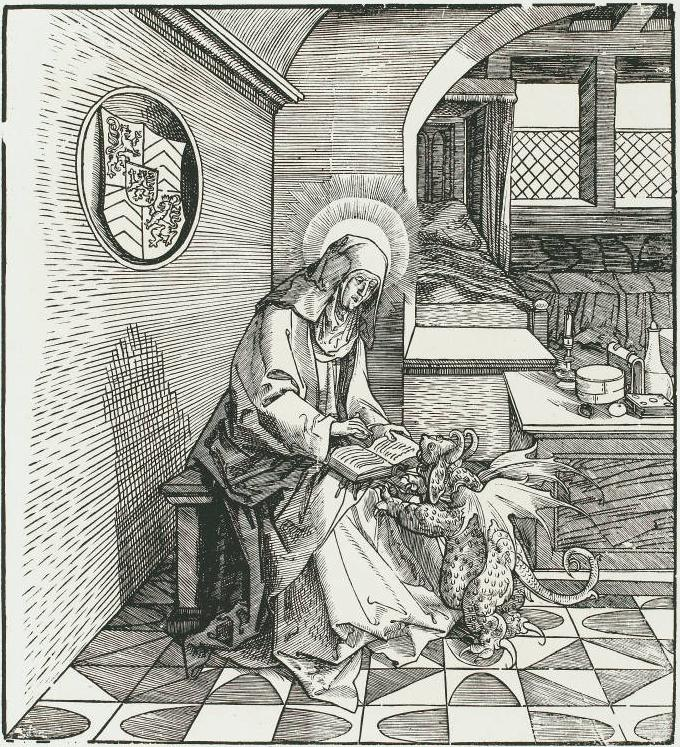
- Sainte Madelbert, abbess of Maubeuge
- Died: 705 or 706; Maubeuge Abbey
- Feast: 7 September
- Tradition or genre: Benedictines

Saint Madelberte of Maubeuge (or Machtelberthe; died c. 705) was a 7th-century nun related to the Merovingian dynasty. She became abbess of Maubeuge Abbey in the County of Hainaut, now in northern France near the Belgian border. She died in 705 or 706.

== Life ==
Madelberte was the daughter of Saint Vincent of Soignies and Saint Waltrude. Around 697 she succeeded her aunt, Saint Aldegonde, and her sister Saint Aldetrude, as abbess of Maubeuge. Her feast day is 7 September.

== Butler's account ==
The hagiographer Alban Butler wrote in his Lives of the Fathers, Martyrs, and Other Principal Saints (1866),

St. Madelberte, V.

ABBESS of Maubeuge, niece to St. Aldegundis, (honoured on the 30th of January,) she had the happiness to be educated in her monastery with her sister Aldetrudis, who, upon the death of her aunt, was chosen second abbess of Maubeuge, and succeeded by her sister Madelberte. This last died about the year 705. She is honoured on the 7th of September in the Belgic and other Martyrologies. Her relics were translated from Maubeuge to Liege by St. Hubert about the year 722. See Perier the Bollandist, p. 109.

== Sources ==
- Bertrand, Paul, ed. (1997), "La Vie de Sainte Madelberte de Maubeuge", Analecta Bollandiana (Text (BHL 5129) and French translation), 115 (1–2), doi:10.1484/J.ABOL.4.01703
- Butler, Alban (1866), The Lives of the Fathers, Martyrs, and Other Principal Saints, James Duffy This article incorporates text from this source, which is in the public domain.
