= Aldegund =

Frankish saint and abbess (c.639-684)

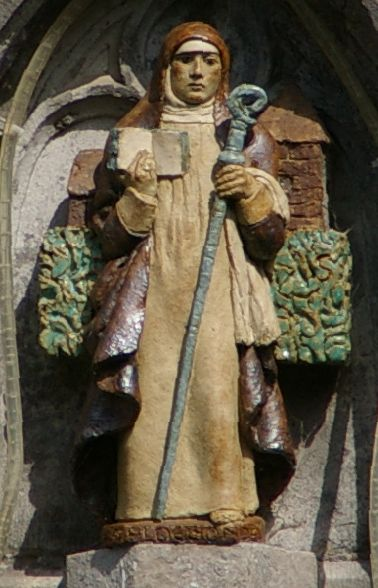
- A statue of Saint Aldegonde on the church of Noirchain (Frameries), Hainaut, Belgium

Virgin and abbess
- Born: 639; Guînes, County of Hainaut
- Died: 684; Abbey of Maubeuge, County of Hainaut
- Venerated in: Roman Catholic Church; Orthodox Church
- Major shrine: Abbey of Maubeuge, Maubeuge, Nord, France
- Feast: January 30
- Patronage: Breast cancer, wounds

Aldegund (c. 639–684), also Aldegundis or Aldegonde, was a Frankish Benedictine abbess who is honored as a saint by the Roman Catholic Church in France and by the Orthodox Church.

Aldegund was closely related to the Merovingian royal family. Her parents, afterwards honored as St. Walbert, Count of Guînes, and St. Bertilla de Mareuil, lived in the County of Hainaut. She is the most famous of what Aline Hornaday calls the "Maubeuge Cycle" of Merovingian saints.

Aldegund was urged to marry, but she chose the life of the cloister. Having allegedly walked across the waters of the Sambre, she had built on its banks a small hospital at Malbode, which later became, under the name Maubeuge Abbey, a famous abbey of Benedictine nuns, though at a later date these were replaced by canonesses.

She died in 684 of breast cancer. Saint Aldegund's Catholic liturgical feast is kept on January 30.

She has been supposed to be the sister of Saint Waltrude (Waudru). She was succeeded by her nieces, Waltrude's daughters, Aldetrude and then Madelberte.

There are several early Lives, but none by contemporaries. Several of these, including the tenth-century biography by Hucbald, are printed by the Bollandists (Acta SS., January 11, 1034–35).
