= Maubeuge Abbey =

Abbey in Nord, France

Coordinates: 50°16′38″N 3°58′38″E

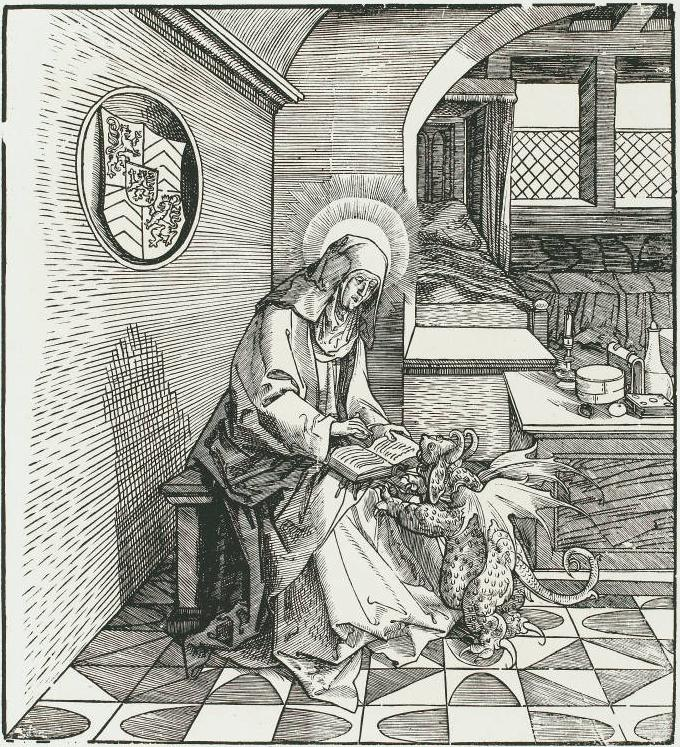
St. Madelberte, Abbess of Maubeuge, being tempted by a demon while in prayer, from a woodcut by Leonhard Beck (1517-1519)

Maubeuge Abbey (French: Abbaye de Maubeuge; Latin: Malbodiense monasterium) was a women's monastery in Maubeuge, in the County of Hainaut, now northern France, close to the modern border with Belgium. It is best known today as the abbey founded by St. Aldegonde, still a popular figure of devotion in the region. It is thought to have possibly been where the young Jan Gossaert, a Renaissance-era painter known as Jan Mabuse, was educated, claimed by some to have been a native of the town of Maubeuge, which grew up around the abbey.

== History ==
Initially founded as a double monastery, that is, a community of both men and women, this abbey was founded in 661 for the care of the sick by the young Aldegonde, who was abbess there until her death in 684, and was also buried there. She was succeeded as abbess by her two nieces, first Aldetrudis and then Madelberte. The abbey soon became a monastery of women, following the Rule of St. Benedict. St. Amalberga of Maubeuge became a member of the community later in the eighth century.

Maubeuge was designated a royal abbey in 864, under the Treaty of Meersen, which divided Lotharingia. In the eleventh century the abbess was a powerful local figure.

At a later date the community changed its observance to the less severe Rule of St. Augustine and the religious, formerly nuns, became styled canonesses regular. A distinctive part of the religious habit they adopted was a gold medal, bearing an image of St. Aldegonde in enamel, suspended on a blue cord tied with a gold tassel.

The abbey was dissolved in 1791 during the French Revolution.

== Abbesses ==
- Aldegonde (661 - 684 †)
- Aldetrude (684 - nk)
- Madelberte (nk - 705 † )
- Théotrade (nk - 935 †)
- Ansoalde (1012)
- Guiscende (1106)
- Fredescente (1106)
- Chrestienne (1138)
- Frehesecende (1149)
- Liduide (1171, during a vacancy)
- Chrestienne or Christine (1173)
- Ermengarde (1175)
- Emme (1177–1202)
- Eusile (1213)
- Eusile (1235–1245)
- Marguerite de Fontaine (1247–1278)
- Elizabeth (1278–1292)
- Béatrix de Faukemont (1292–1339)
- Marie de Faukemont (1351–1371)
- Gertrude de Trazegnies (1381–1429)
- Marguerite de Gavre, called d'Hérimez (1429 - 1443 †)
- Péronne de Landas (1444–1467)
- Iolende de Gavre (1468–1482)
- Antoinette de Hénin-Liénard, called de Fontaine (1483)
- Michelle de Gavre (1507–1547)
- Françoise de Nouvelle (1548 - 1557 †)
- Marguerite de Hinckart (1558 - 1578 †)
- Antoinette de Sainzelle (1581–1596)
- Christine de Bernaige (1599–1624)
- Bonne de Haynin (1625–1643)
- Marie de Noyelles (1644 - 1654 †)
- Marguerite d’Oignies (1655)
- Ferdinande de Bernaige (1660–1669)
- Anne-Chrétienne de Beaufort (1672–1698)
- Claire-Hyacinthe de Noyelles (1699–1719)
- Izabelle-Philippine de Hornes (1719–1741)
- Marie Thérèse Charlotte de Croï (1741–1774)
- Adrienne-Florence de Lannoy (1775–1791)

== Sources ==
- Moreira, Isabel (2000), Dreams, Visions, and Spiritual Authority in Merovingian Gaul, Appendix B, The Earliest Vitae of Aldegund of Maubeuge
