= Pagus =

Ancient Roman term for a rural subdivision of a tribal territory

Approximate pagi in Burgundy, 9th century

In ancient Rome, the Latin word pagus (plural pagi) was an administrative term designating a rural subdivision of a tribal territory, which included individual farms, villages (vici), and strongholds (oppida) serving as refuges, as well as an early medieval geographical term. From the reign of Diocletian (284–305 AD) onwards, the pagus referred to the smallest administrative unit of a province. These geographical units were used to describe territories in the Merovingian and Carolingian periods, without any political or administrative meaning.

== Etymology ==
Pāgus is a native Latin word from a root pāg-, a lengthened grade of Indo-European *paǵ-, a verbal root, "fasten" (pango); it may be translated in the word as "boundary staked out on the ground". In semantics, *pag- used in pāgus is a stative verb with an unmarked lexical aspect of state resulting from completed action: "it is having been staked out", converted into a noun by -us, a type recognizable in English adjectives such as surveyed, defined, noted, etc. English does not use the noun: "the surveyed", but Latin characteristically does. Considering that the ancients marked out municipal districts with boundary stones, the root meaning is nothing more than land surveyed for a municipality with stakes and later marked by boundary stones, a process that has not changed over the millennia.

Earlier hypotheses concerning the derivation of pāgus suggested that it is a Greek loan from either πήγη, pége, 'village well', or πάγος, págos, 'hill-fort'. William Smith opposed these on the grounds that neither the well nor the hill-fort appear in the meaning of pāgus.

The word pagus is the origin of the word for country in Romance languages, such as pays (French) and país (Spanish), and more remotely, for English "peasant". Corresponding adjective paganus served as the source for "pagan".

== Roman usage ==
In classical Latin, pagus referred to a country district or to a community within a larger polity; Julius Caesar, for instance, refers to pagi within the greater polity of the Celtic Helvetii.

The pagus and vicus (a small nucleated settlement or village) are characteristic of pre-urban organization of the countryside. In Latin epigraphy of the Republican era, pagus refers to local territorial divisions of the peoples of the central Apennines and is assumed to express local social structures as they existed variously.

As an informal designation for a rural district, pagus was a flexible term to encompass the cultural horizons of "folk" whose lives were circumscribed by their locality: agricultural workers, peasants, slaves. Within the reduced area of Diocletian's subdivided provinces, the pagani could have several kinds of focal centers. Some were administered from a city, possibly the seat of a bishop; other pagi were administered from a vicus that might be no more than a cluster of houses and an informal market; yet other pagi in the areas of the great agricultural estates (latifundia) were administered through the villa at the center.

The historian of Christianity Peter Brown has pointed out that in its original sense paganus meant a civilian or commoner, one who was excluded from power and thus regarded as of lesser account; away from the administrative center, whether that was the seat of a bishop, a walled town or merely a fortified village, such inhabitants of the outlying districts, the pagi, tended to cling to the old ways and gave their name to "pagans"; the word was used pejoratively by Christians in the Latin West to demean those who declined to convert from the traditional religions of antiquity.

== Post-Roman pagus ==
The concept of the pagus survived the collapse of the Empire of the West. In the Frankish kingdoms of the 8th–9th centuries, however, the pagus had come to serve as a local geographical designation rather than an administrative unit. Particular localities were often named as parts of more than one pagus, sometimes even within the same document. Historians traditionally considered the pagus under the Carolingian Empire to be the territory held by a count, but Carolingian sources never refer to counts of particular pagi, and from the 10th century onwards the "county" or comitatus was sometimes explicitly contrasted to the pagus. Unlike the comitati, the centers of which are often identifiable as the count's seat, towns are not known to have derived any special political significance from serving as the ostensible centers of pagi.

The majority of modern French pays are roughly coextensive with the old counties (e.g., county of Comminges, county of Ponthieu, etc.) For instance, at the beginning of the 5th century, when the Notitia provinciarum et civitatum Galliae was drawn up, the Provincia Gallia Lugdunensis Secunda formed the ecclesiastical province of Rouen, with six suffragan sees; it contained seven cities (civitates). The province of Rouen included the civitas of Rotomagus (Rouen), which formed the pagus Rotomagensis (Roumois); in addition there were the pagi Caletus (Pays de Caux), Vilcassinus (the Vexin), the Tellaus (Talou); Bayeux, the pagus Bajocassinus (Bessin, including briefly in the 9th century the Otlinga Saxonia); that of Lisieux the pagus Lexovinus (Lieuvin); that of Coutances the p. Corilensis and p. Constantinus (Cotentin); that of Avranches the p. Abrincatinus (Avranchin); that of Sez the p. Oximensis (Hiémois), the p. Sagensis and p. Corbonensis (Corbonnais); and that of Evreux the p. Ebroicinus (Evrecin) and p. Madriacensis (pays de Madrie).

The Welsh successor kingdom of Powys derived its name from pagus or pagenses, and gives its name to the modern Welsh county.

The pagus was the equivalent of what English-speaking historians sometimes refer to as the "Carolingian shire", which in German is the Gau. In Latin texts, a canton of the Helvetic Confederacy is rendered pagus.

== Bibliography ==
- Ivan Sache, "The formation of the French provinces"
