= Blaye =

- Subprefecture and commune
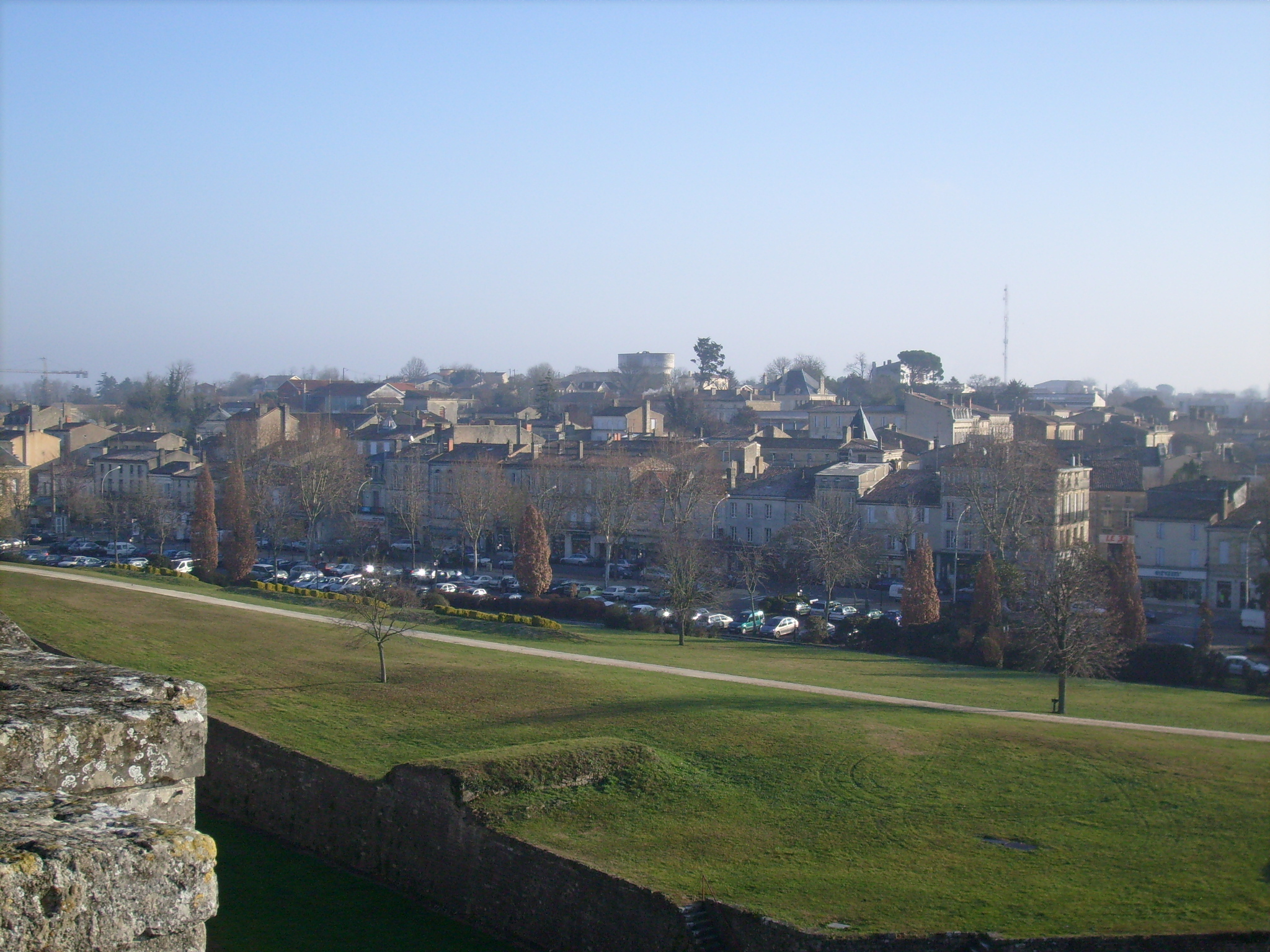
- A general view of Blaye

- Flag Coat of arms
- Location of Blaye
- Location within France Location within Nouvelle-Aquitaine
- Coordinates: 45°07′43″N 0°39′40″W
- Country: France
- Region: Nouvelle-Aquitaine
- Department: Gironde
- Arrondissement: Blaye
- Canton: L'Estuaire

Government
  - Mayor (2020–2026): Denis Baldès
- Area^{1}: 6.42 km^{2} (2.48 sq mi)
- Elevation: 7 m (23 ft)
- Highest elevation: 41 m (135 ft)
- Lowest elevation: 0 m (0 ft)
- Population (2023): 5,066
  - Density: 789/km^{2} (2,040/sq mi)
- Time zone: UTC+01:00 (CET)
  - Summer (DST): UTC+02:00 (CEST)
- INSEE/Postal code: 33058 /33390
- ^{1} French Land Register data, which excludes lakes, ponds, glaciers > 1 km^{2} (0.386 sq mi or 247 acres) and river estuaries.

Blaye (French: [blaj]; Occitan: Blaia pronounced [ˈblajɔ]) is a commune and subprefecture in the Gironde department in Nouvelle-Aquitaine in southwestern France. For centuries, Blaye was a particularly convenient crossing point for those who came from the north and went to Bordeaux or further south, to Spain and Portugal. Fortified since antiquity, this eminently strategic site located on the bank of a large river, was modernized at the end of the 17th century, thanks to Vauban.

In 1685, the Commissaire general des fortifications of Louis XIV proposed the construction of a real lock on the Gironde in order to "take control of the river" and to hold Bordeaux in case of a revolt. It is then that the Citadel de Blaye was built, constituting the major element of the estuary control system. Dominating the urban landscape, this imposing building has been listed as a UNESCO World Heritage Site since 2008, as part of a group of structures engineered by Vauban, in testimony to their global influence on military architecture and planning over the next few centuries.

== Population ==
Its inhabitants are called Blayais or Blayaises in French.

Historical population

| Year | Pop. | ±% p.a. |
|---|---|---|
| 1793 | 4,715 | — |
| 1800 | 3,580 | −3.86% |
| 1806 | 3,428 | −0.72% |
| 1821 | 4,013 | +1.06% |
| 1831 | 3,855 | −0.40% |
| 1836 | 3,801 | −0.28% |
| 1841 | 4,174 | +1.89% |
| 1846 | 4,410 | +1.11% |
| 1851 | 4,659 | +1.10% |
| 1856 | 4,302 | −1.58% |
| 1861 | 4,972 | +2.94% |
| 1866 | 4,761 | −0.86% |
| 1872 | 4,478 | −1.02% |
| 1876 | 4,522 | +0.24% |
| 1881 | 4,512 | −0.04% |
| 1886 | 4,340 | −0.77% |
| 1891 | 5,015 | +2.93% |
| 1896 | 4,799 | −0.88% |
| 1901 | 4,775 | −0.10% |

| Year | Pop. | ±% p.a. |
|---|---|---|
| 1906 | 4,890 | +0.48% |
| 1911 | 4,741 | −0.62% |
| 1921 | 4,274 | −1.03% |
| 1926 | 4,240 | −0.16% |
| 1931 | 4,054 | −0.89% |
| 1936 | 3,768 | −1.45% |
| 1946 | 3,788 | +0.05% |
| 1954 | 4,047 | +0.83% |
| 1962 | 4,291 | +0.73% |
| 1968 | 4,355 | +0.25% |
| 1975 | 4,051 | −1.03% |
| 1982 | 4,559 | +1.70% |
| 1990 | 4,286 | −0.77% |
| 1999 | 4,666 | +0.95% |
| 2007 | 4,894 | +0.60% |
| 2012 | 4,710 | −0.76% |
| 2017 | 4,835 | +0.53% |
| 2023 | 5,066 | +0.78% |

Source: EHESS and INSEE (1968-2023)

== Geography ==
Blaye is located on the right bank of the Gironde estuary (which is some 3 km (1.9 mi) wide at this point), close to the A10 autoroute, 56 km (35 mi) north of Bordeaux. There is a rail line with occasional freight trains, but no passenger services. A small ferry crosses the Gironde to Lamarque, in Medoc.

== History ==
In ancient times Blaye (Blavia) was a port of the Santones. Tradition states that the Frankish hero Roland was buried in its basilica, which was on the site of the citadel. It is an important location in the epic Jourdain de Blaye.

Blaye was early an important stronghold which played an important part in the wars against the English (who burnt it in 1352) and the French Wars of Religion (when it was the site of a Spanish naval victory in 1593). The duchess of Berry was imprisoned in its fortress in 1832–1833.

The town was formerly named Blaye-et-Sainte-Luce and was renamed Blaye in June 1961.

== Sights ==
The town has a citadel built by Vauban on a rock beside the river, which contains the ruins of a medieval castle, Château des Rudel(fr), and the ruins of Basilica of Saint-Romain, which holds the tomb of Charibert II, king of Aquitaine, and son of Clotaire II. Nearby, Fort Paté, on an island in the river, and Fort Médoc on its left bank, also of the 17th century, completed Vauban's defenses of the water approaches of Bordeaux .

The citadel of Blaye, its city walls, Fort Paté and Fort Médoc (the latter in nearby Cussac-Fort-Médoc) were listed in 2008 as UNESCO World Heritage Sites, as part of the "Fortifications of Vauban" group.

== Economy ==
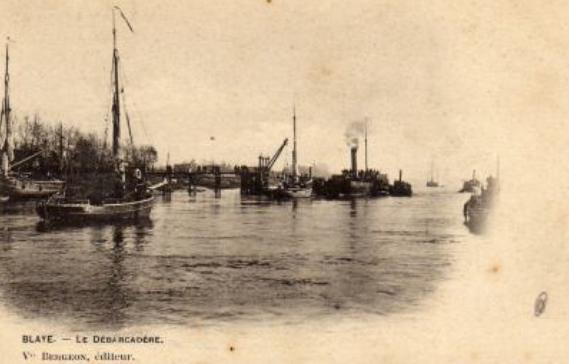
Blaye, unloading dock c. 1905

Blaye has a small river-port, mainly used for grain exports. Fine red wine is produced in the district, in the AOC Côtes de Blaye. A large nuclear power station with four reactors is located nearby.

== Education ==
Several schools are located in Blaye.

Public schools include the following:

- École Maternelle Pierre Bergeon
- École Maternelle Lucien Grosperrin
- École Elementaire Pierre Malbeteau
- École Elementaire Andre Vallaeys

== Legal institutions ==
The town has tribunals of first instance and of commerce.

== Twin towns – sister cities ==
Blaye is twinned with:

- (Romania) Măcin

== See also ==
- Bordeaux wine regions
- Château des Rudel
- Communes of the Gironde department
