= Tahiti (disambiguation) =

Tahiti is an island in French Polynesia.

Tahiti may also refer to:

== Arts and entertainment ==
- Tahiti (group), a South Korean girl group
- "T.A.H.I.T.I.", an episode of Agents of S.H.I.E.L.D.
- Tahiti, an American pop duo best known for singing insert songs for The Real Ghostbusters animated series
- "Tahiti", song by Jim Reeves from his album The International Jim Reeves, 1963
- "Tahiti", song by David Essex from the 1985 musical Mutiny!
- Tahiti Bob and Tahiti Mel are used in French dubbing version of The Simpsons for Sideshow Bob and Sideshow Mel respectively

== Other ==
- Île Sans Nom, France which is also known as Tahiti
- RMS Tahiti, a 1904 ocean liner
- The code name of the AMD Radeon GPU series chip Radeon HD 7900 (also some r9 2xx chips have a tahiti gpu in them)

== See also ==
- Tahitian (disambiguation)
