= Fortifications of Vauban =

UNESCO World Heritage Site
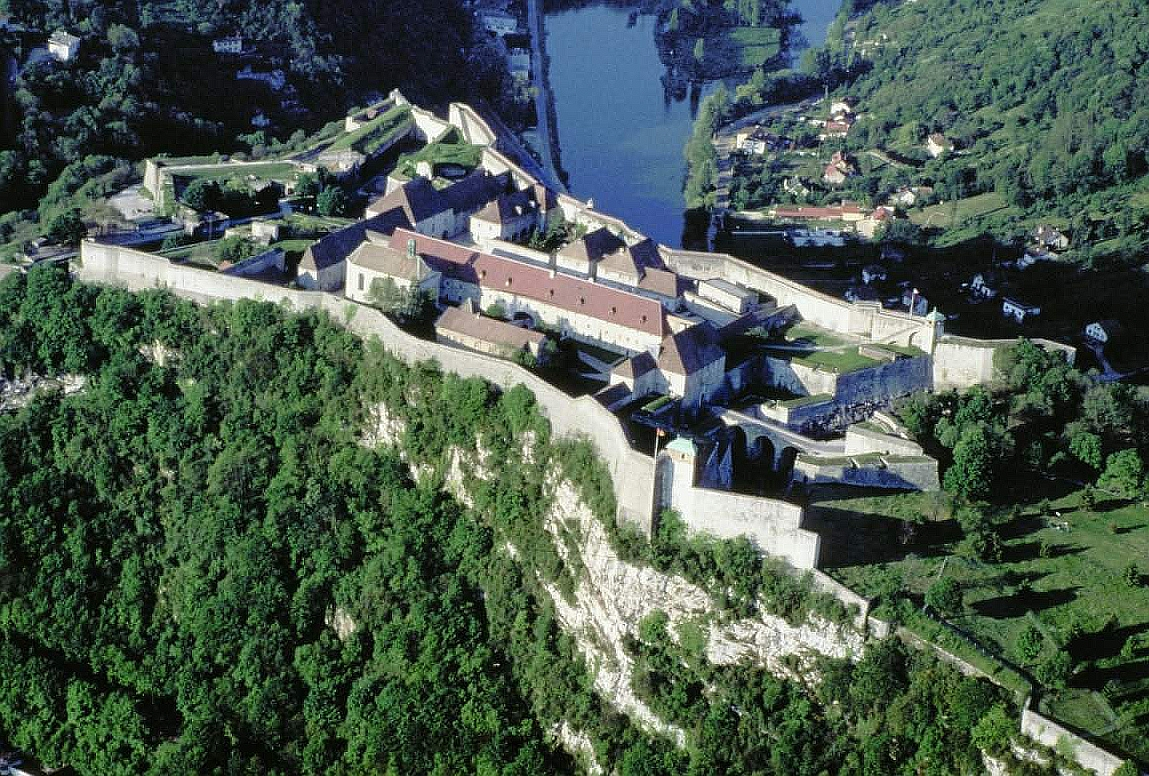
- Citadel of Besançon, Doubs
- Interactive map of Fortifications of Vauban
- Location: France
- Includes: 12 locations in France
- Criteria: Cultural: (i), (ii), (iv)
- Reference: 1283
- Inscription: 2008 (32nd Session)
- Area: 1,153.16 ha (2,849.5 acres)
- Buffer zone: 4,341 ha (10,730 acres)
- Coordinates: 47°14′10″N 6°1′37″E

The Fortifications of Vauban is a UNESCO World Heritage Site made up of 12 groups of fortified buildings and sites along the borders of France. They were designed by military architect Sébastien Le Prestre de Vauban (1633–1707) during the reign of King Louis XIV. These sites include a variety of fortifications, ranging from citadels, to mountain batteries and sea fortifications, to bastion walls and towers. In addition, the site includes cities built from scratch by Vauban and communication towers. These sites were chosen because they exemplify Vauban's work, bearing witness to the influence of his designs on military and civilian engineering on a global scale from the 17th century to the 20th century.

The network of major sites of Vauban is an association of cities created on 30 March 2005 at the initiative of the city of Besançon. It includes the twelve sites which best represent the fortification system erected by Vauban. The application file was selected on 5 January 2007 by the Ministry of Culture to represent France. On 7 July 2008, twelve of the network's fourteen sites were added to the list at the UNESCO annual meeting in Quebec City.

== History of UNESCO nomination ==
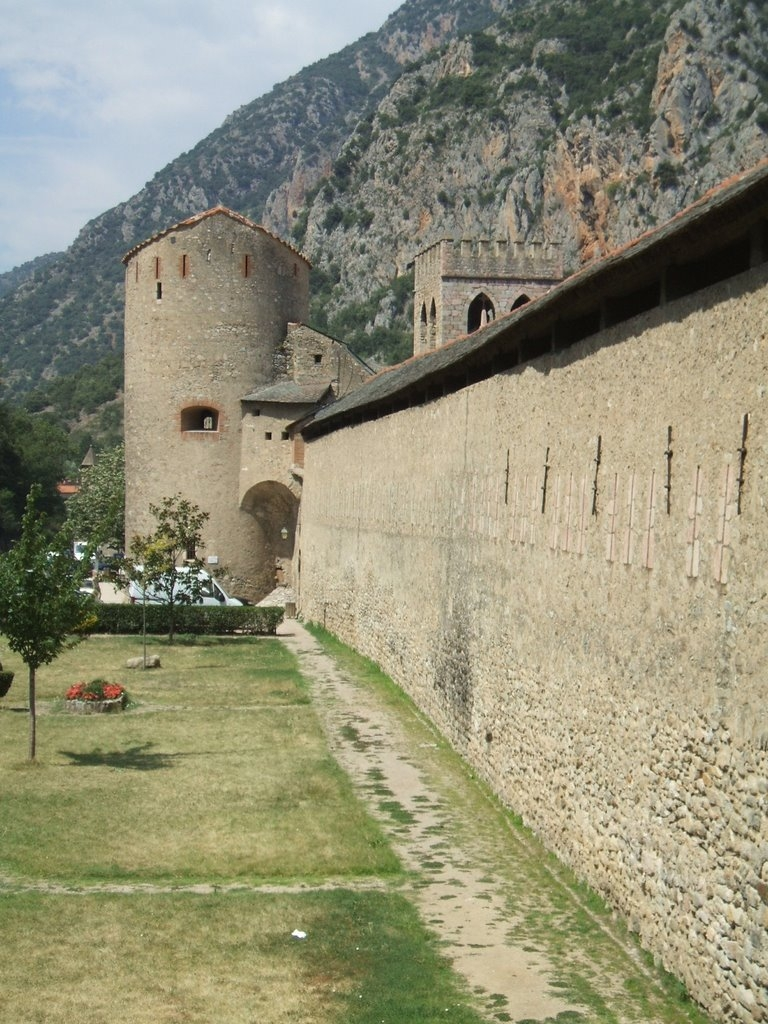
Villefranche-de-Conflent: city fortification wall, with Tour du Diable (the Devil's Tower).

In 2003, the city of Besançon investigated the possibility of a UNESCO World Heritage nomination. After taking the advice of specialists, they decided to mount an application in the form of a network representing the entire genius of the architect Sébastien Le Prestre de Vauban, to best meet the criteria issued by UNESCO. An initial selection of eight sites was formed in 2005, followed by a final list of fourteen sites, out of the 150 fortifications left by Vauban. The selections were finally validated by a scientific council on 31 March 2006. (In competition with the potential UNESCO World Heritage nomination, consisting of the works of Le Corbusier, each country could submit only one file each year).

The Vauban network was finally selected on 5 January 2007 by the Ministry of Culture, as the celebrations for the tercentenary of the architect's death began.

On 7 July 2008, twelve of the fourteen network sites were admitted to the final World Heritage List. The sites of Bazoches Castle in the Nièvre and the fort transformed into a citadel of the Palace at Belle-Île-en-Mer in Morbihan were excluded from the registration. The citadel of Belle-Île-en-Mer were rejected by UNESCO for its "lack of authenticity", particularly due to a hotel project within it. Although this raised questions, the fact that these two sites were private properties would not have played a part in this decision.

== The twelve sites ==
Location of the sites

There are twelve sites in total, circumscribing most of present-day France.

=== Vauban Citadel, Arras ===
The Vauban Citadel, located in Arras, Pas-de-Calais, was built by Vauban from 1667 to 1672. The Citadel has been nicknamed La belle inutile (the beautiful useless one) by residents as it has never been directly involved in heavy fighting, and ultimately failed to prevent the Germans from occupying the city in either World War. Within the citadel on the side of La Place de Manœuvre a small Baroque-style chapel was built. Outside, Le Mur des Fusillés (the wall of the people executed by a firing squad) pays tribute to the 218 members of the French Resistance shot in the citadel's ditch during World War II.

=== Citadel of Besançon ===
The Citadel of Besançon, in Besançon, Doubs, is considered one of Vauban's finest works of military architecture. The Citadel occupies 11 hectares (27 acres) on Mount Saint-Etienne, one of the seven hills that protect Besançon, the capital of Franche-Comté. Mount Saint-Etienne occupies the neck of an oxbow formed by the river Doubs, giving the site a strategic importance that Julius Caesar recognised as early as 58 BC. The Citadel, built between 1668 and 1683, overlooks the old quarter of the city and the oxbow bend. Vauban returned to Besançon 17 times between 1674 and 1703 to oversee the progress of the work. The Citadel is built on top of a large syncline on a rectangular field crossed across its width by three successive bastions (enclosures, or fronts) behind which extend three plazas. The whole town is surrounded by walls covered by circular paths and punctuated by watchtowers and sentry posts. The walls are up to 15 to 20 metres (49 to 66 ft) high with a thickness between 5 and 6 metres (16 and 20 ft). Also included in this site is Fort Griffon, built between 1680 and 1684.

=== Sites at Blaye-Cussac-Fort-Médoc ===
The Citadel de Blaye, city walls, Fort Paté and Fort Médoc are located in Blaye-Cussac-Fort-Médoc, Gironde. The citadel at Blaye was built between 1686 and 1689, and the neighboring Fort Paté and Fort Médoc were built from 1689 to 1700. The juxtaposition of these three sites across the Gironde estuary helped to protect Bordeaux in case of a possible sea invasion.

=== Briançon, Hautes-Alpes ===
This site, located in Briançon, Hautes-Alpes, contains a town wall, four forts (including the Fort des Trois-Têtes and Fort du Randouillet), the Redoute des Salettes, the ouvrage de la communication Y, as well as the Asfeld Bridge. The medieval town wall was reconstructed by Vauban between 1692 and 1700, the forts were built according to his specifications between 1709 and 1732, the communications tower between 1724 and 1734, and Asfeld Bridge between 1729 and 1731.

=== Tour Vauban ===
The Tour Vauban, also known as the Tour dorée (meaning "Gilded Tower") is in Camaret-sur-Mer, Finistère. It is an 18m-high polygonal defensive tower built from 1693 to 1695 using a plan by Vauban on the Sillon at Camaret-sur-Mer, as part of the fortifications of the goulet de Brest. It has three levels and is flanked by walls, a guardhouse and a gun battery which can hold 11 cannons as well as a cannonball foundry added in the French Revolution period.

=== Ville neuve, Longwy ===
The ville neuve (meaning new city) is located in Longwy, Meurthe-et-Moselle. The entire new town was designed and built by Vauban starting in 1679. It has a hexagonal shape with a regular layout surrounding a square parade ground and flanked by bastions. Although the town was mostly destroyed due to repeated sieges, many elements of the military architecture still remain; notably, the defences performed well as late as 1914.

=== Place forte, Mont-Dauphin ===
The site of the place forte is located in Mont-Dauphin, Hautes-Alpes. Built in 1692 by Vauban on the head of a plateau, it follows an orthogonal plan and contains various military buildings dating from the 16th through 18th centuries.

=== Citadel and city walls, Mount-Louis ===
The citadel and city walls of Mont-Louis are located in Mont-Louis, Pyrénées-Orientales. They were built in 1679 in order to facilitate trans-border crossings with Spain, and contain a square citadel and fortified town walls with 25 sentry posts.

=== Ville neuve, Neuf-Brisach ===
The ville neuve in Neuf-Brisach, Haut-Rhin is located close to the German border with France. Built from scratch between 1698 and 1703, it is one of Vauban's last works, intended to guard the border with Germany (then the Holy Roman Empire). It is the only example of Vauban's “third fortified system”, with a double town wall.

=== Citadel and city walls, Saint-Martin-de-Ré ===
A Citadel and city walls designed by Vauban between 1681 and 1685 are located in Saint-Martin-de-Ré, Charente-Maritime. The citadel, ringed by six bastions and a dry moat, was built in only 40 days.

=== Watchtowers, Saint-Vaast-la-Hougue ===
Two watchtowers designed by Vauban and his student are located in the commune of Saint-Vaast-la-Hougue, Manche. They face each other across the Saint-Vaast Bay, with the taller, two-story watchtower located on the island of Tatihou. Built in 1694, the watchtowers have a truncated-conical shape, and are surrounded by bastion fort holding chapels, barracks, and powder magazines.

=== Sites at Villefranche-de-Conflent ===
Fort Libéria, Cova Bastera, and the city walls of Villefranche-de-Conflent, Pyrénées-Orientales are also part of the world heritage site. Vauban's alterations to the town wall began in 1669, Fort Libéria was built in 1679, and the Cova Bastera was installed after Vauban's death, in 1707.

Two sites initially considered were removed from the final list: A château in Bazoches, Nièvre, and the citadel and walls surrounding Le Palais in Belle-Île-en-Mer, Morbihan.

== Gallery ==
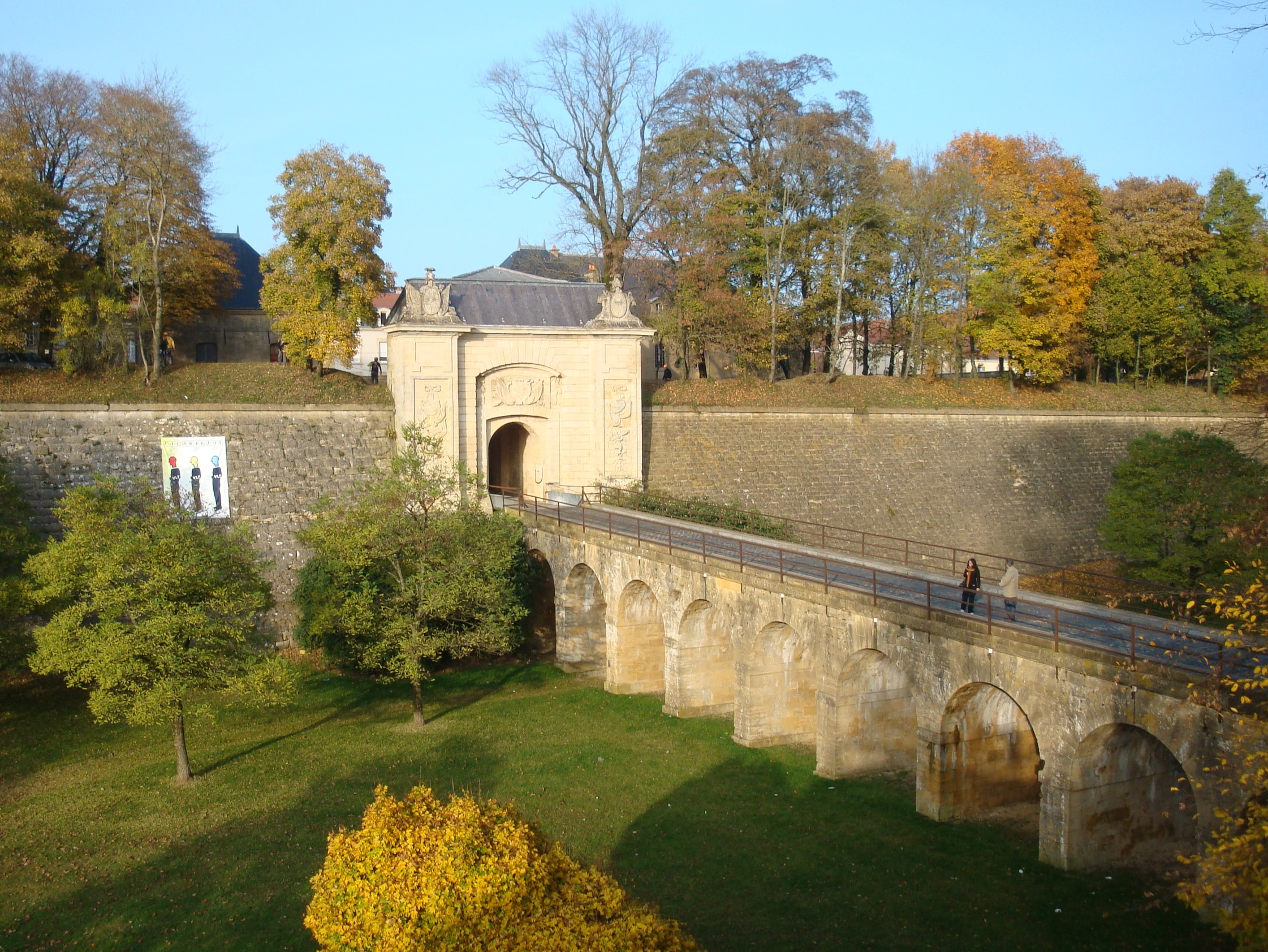
Longwy

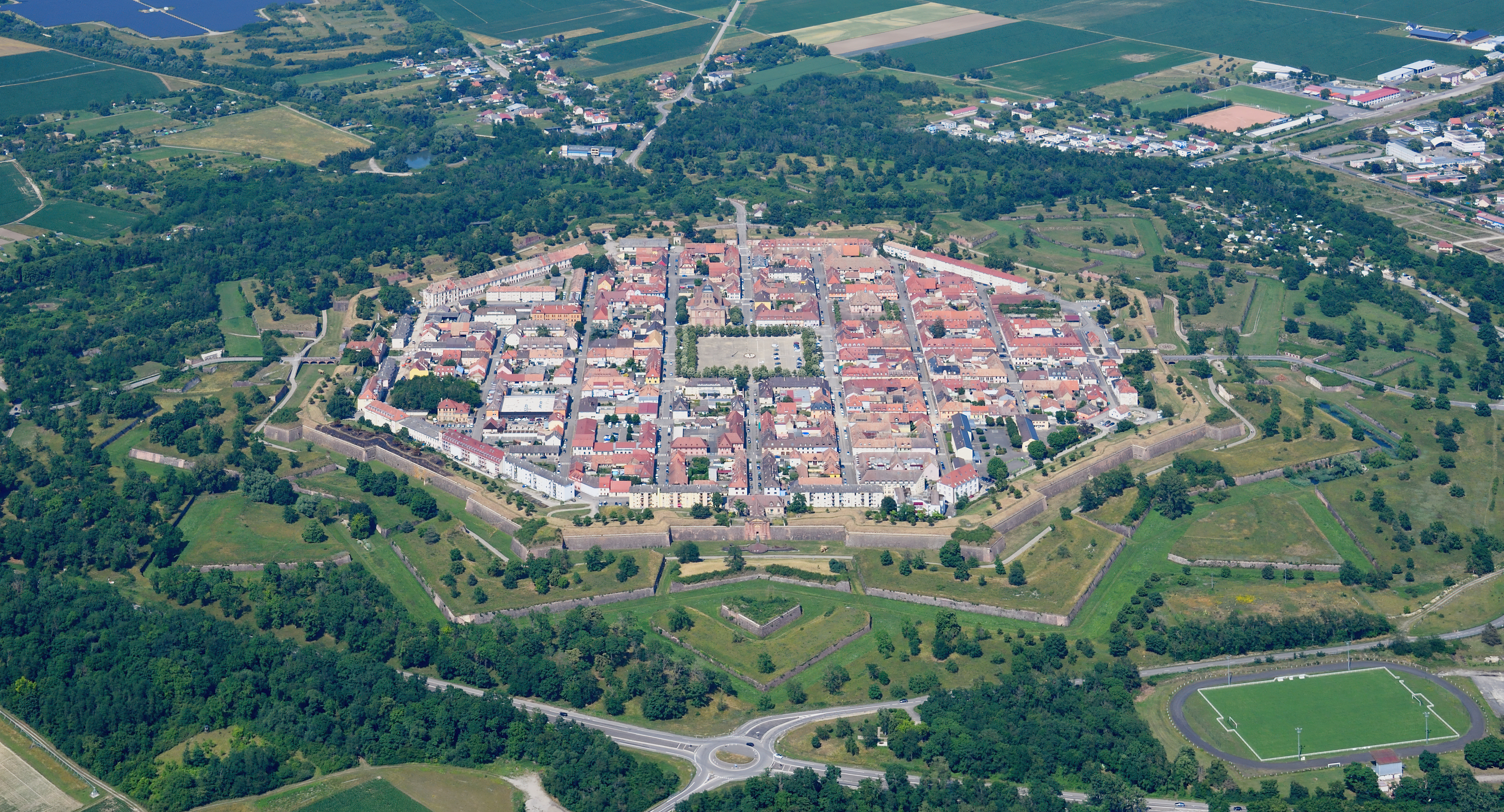
Neuf-Brisach

== See also ==
- Vauban fortifications
- Sébastien Le Prestre de Vauban
- Badajoz bastioned enclosure
