= Mysterious Island (disambiguation) =

The Mysterious Island is the English title for Jules Verne's 1874 novel L'Île mystérieuse.

The Mysterious Island or Mysterious Island may also refer to:

== Works inspired by Jules Verne's novel ==
- The Mysterious Island (1929 film), an adaptation of Jules Verne's novel, directed by Lucien Hubbard
- Mysterious Island (1941 film), a USSR production, directed by Eduard Pentslin
- Mysterious Island (serial), a 1951 serial directed by Spencer Gordon Bennet
- Mysterious Island (1961 film), directed by Cy Endfield, also known as Jules Verne's Mysterious Island, featuring special effects from Ray Harryhausen
- La isla misteriosa y el capitán Nemo, or L'Île mystérieuse, a 1973 TV miniseries directed by Juan Antonio Bardem and Henri Colpi and featuring Omar Sharif as Captain Nemo
- Mysterious Island (TV series), a 1995 Canadian television series
- Mysterious Island (2005 film), a Hallmark Channel TV movie
- Journey 2: The Mysterious Island, a 2012 film loosely based on Jules Verne's novel and a sequel to 2008 film Journey to the Center of the Earth
- Jules Verne's Mysterious Island (2012 film), an adventure film

== Others ==
- The Mysterious Islands, a 2009 documentary film by Vision Forum Films
- The Mysterious Island (1905 film), based on the Odyssey
- Mysterious Island (Tokyo DisneySea), an attraction at Tokyo DisneySea
- "Mysterious Island", a 2017 episode of "Islands" from Adventure Time
- Mysterious Island, alternate title for the 1982 film The Brave Archer and His Mate, a Hong Kong production, directed by Cheh Chang
- Mysterious Island (2011 film), a Chinese horror film
- Île Sans Nom, an island in Gironde, France also known as L'Île Mystérieuse

== See also ==
- The Land Before Time V: The Mysterious Island, a 1997 American animated film from The Land Before Time movies
- The Little Polar Bear 2 – The Mysterious Island, a 2005 German animated film from The Little Polar Bear movies
- Mystery Island (disambiguation)
