= Château des Rudel =

Château in Nouvelle-Aquitaine, France

Coordinates: 45°07′48″N 0°39′57″W

- Castèth daus Rudel
- Blaye, Gironde, Nouvelle-Aquitaine in France
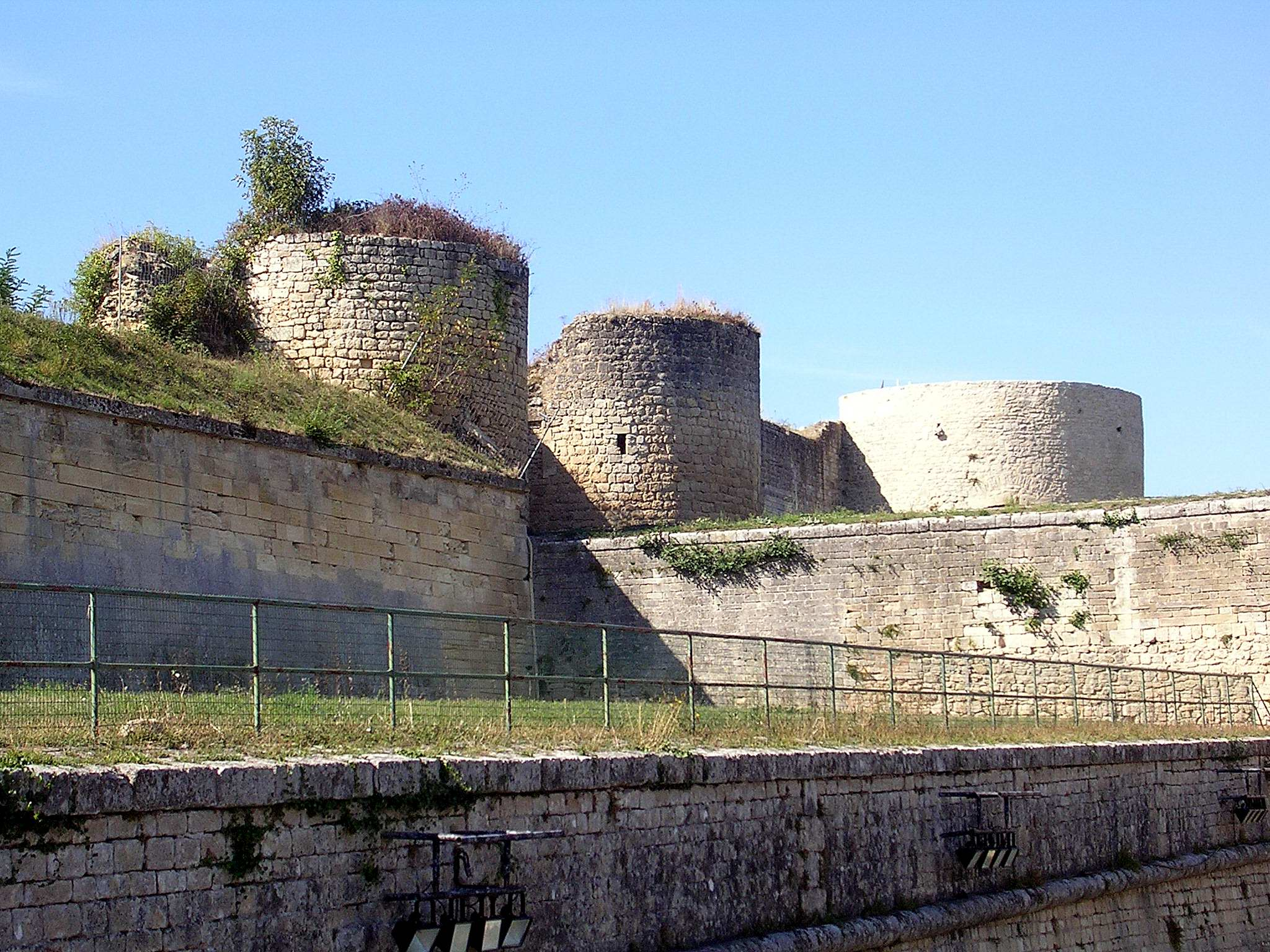

Site information
- Type: Citadel
- Owner: Commune
- Condition: Fortified place

Site history
- Built: 12th century

The Château des Rudel is a château in Blaye, Gironde, Nouvelle-Aquitaine, France. It was built to protect the fortified town of Blaye from possible enemy incursions and is built on a rocky spur overlooking the Gironde estuary.

It was constructed in the 12th century, the chateau was then besieged by Protestants during the French Wars of Religion in the 16th century and it now lies in ruins.

== History ==
As early as the 4th century, a castrum is mentioned by the poet Ausonius (c.310 – c.395). A few centuries later, the King of Aquitaine, Charibert II, had a first fortress built on the site, which was then captured in 994 by the Counts of Angoulême and the Rudel family.

Jaufré Rudel, as described in his biography as the "Prince of Blaye," remains one of the emblematic figures of this castle. Born around 1113, this famous troubadour distinguished himself by writing poems celebrating courtly love. One of his best-known works is "L'amor de luenh" a poem written in Occitan is dedicated to an Eastern princess. Jaufré Rudel went on crusade and (probably) died around 1148 near Jerusalem.

In the second half of the 12th century, the lordship of Blaye fell to Geoffroy II and then to his son Geoffroy III who died in 1245. The castle was then entrusted to Anglo-Gascon lords who administered the place until Aquitaine became definitively French.

The castle was then besieged during the Wars of Religion by Calvinist armies. It was also reinforced during the reign of King Louis XIII (1610–1643) before being incorporated into the citadel commissioned by his successor. In 1685, Louis XIV (1638–1715) ordered Sébastien Le Prestre, Marquis of Vauban to oversee the construction of a vast 38-hectare citadel intended to be "the lock of Bordeaux". While part of the medieval town was destroyed to build the new fortress, the castle was preserved to serve as the residence of the military governors of the city.

As the English prepared to lay siege to the city in 1814, the military authorities decided to demolish two-thirds of the walls of the old castle. Once peace returned, the castle was no longer maintained and it fell into ruin over the next several decades.

In the 1950s, several pieces of the castle were moved to safety, notably an oak door adorned with the arms of France, dating from the 17th century, which is now on display at the archaeological museum, as well as the finds from subsequent excavations in the castle's surroundings. In 2005, a grant was awarded by the General Council to preserve the ruins. An integral part of the citadel, the ruins are within the area designated as a historical monument on 11 May 2009, and was registered in July 2008 on the UNESCO World Heritage List as part of the .

== Description ==
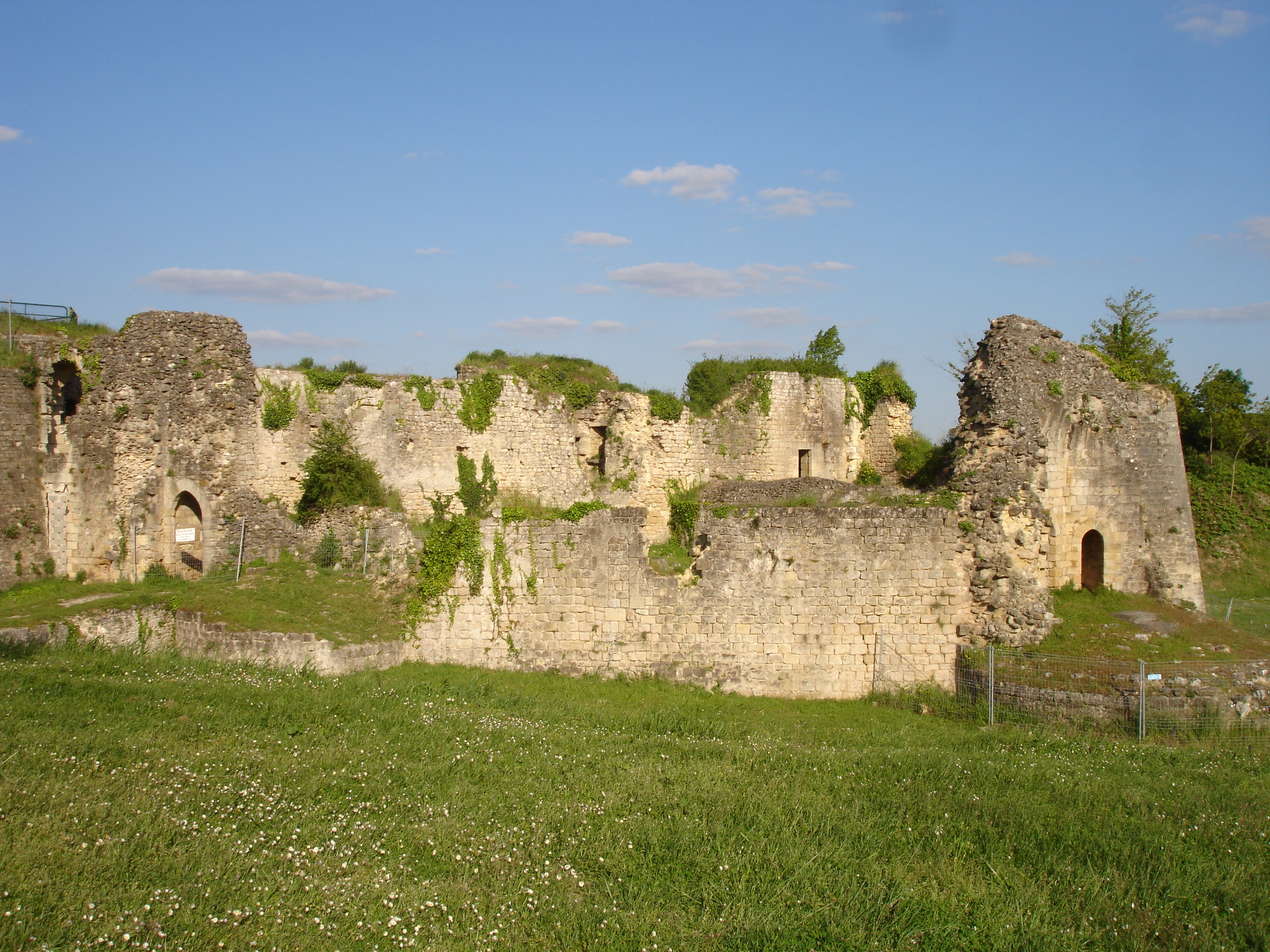
Château des Rudel

The Rudel castle is an atypical example of castle architecture in the Aquitaine region. It is designed on a triangular plan, it consists of a central courtyard around which three buildings are arranged, themselves protected by curtain walls and six circular towers.

A gate is equipped with a drawbridge opens onto a barbican (fortified outpost or fortified gateway), which was later modified.

Despite the building's dilapidated state, the original structure remains visible. This is how the six medieval towers can still be found: these are the Round Tower (to the north), the Diana Tower (to the southwest), the Gate Tower (to the west), the Archives Tower (to the south), the Bell Tower (to the northeast) and the keep.

Among the vanished buildings, ancient texts mention a Saint Nicholas chapel. Remains of it were discovered during archaeological excavations in 1959 and are on display at the archaeological museum.
