= Fort Médoc =

Coordinates: 45°06′41″N 0°42′08″W

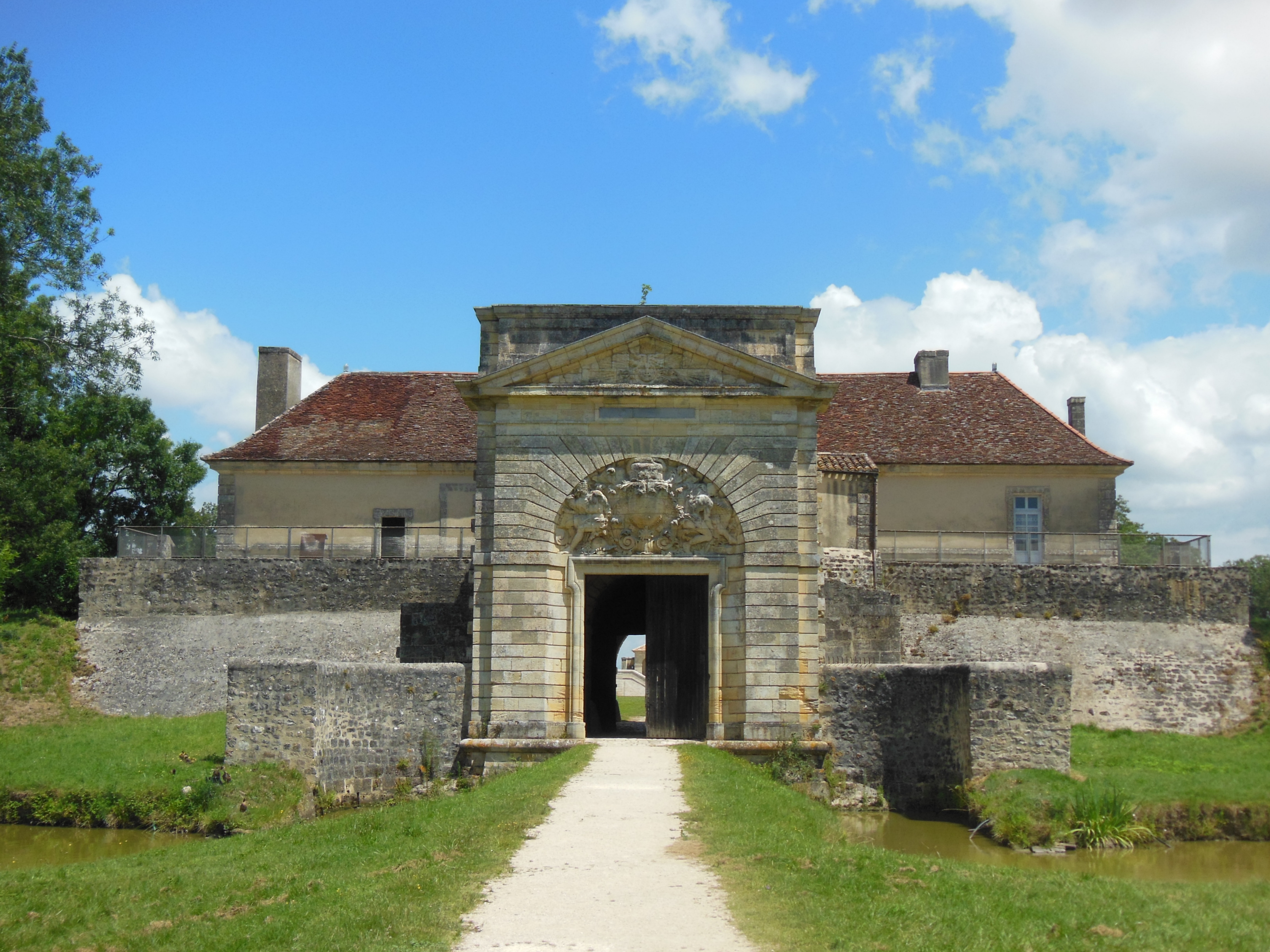
Fort Médoc Royal Guard

Fort Médoc is a fort built by Vauban, nearby Cussac-Fort-Médoc, in Gironde, Nouvelle-Aquitaine, France. The earthworks were started in 1689 and construction of the fort itself in 1691.

The fort was an element of the "lock" intended to protect Bordeaux against the risk of invasion from the river, having been built on the left bank of the Gironde estuary, complementing Fort Paté, and the Blaye Citadel, which is located on the right hand bank of the Gironde.

With the Citadel de Blaye, its city walls and Fort Paté, Fort Médoc was listed in 2008 as UNESCO World Heritage Sites, as part of the "Fortifications of Vauban" group.
