= Mystery Island (disambiguation) =

Mystery Island is a 1977–78 American children's science-fiction television programme.

Mystery Island may also refer to:

- Mystery Island (Vanuatu), officially Inyeug Island, a small uninhabited island belonging to Vanuatu
- Mystery Island (1937 film), an Australian film
- Mystery Island (1966 film), a film made by combining two episodes of The Baron
- Mystery Island, a 2023 Hallmark mystery film and film series
- Mystery Island (book), 1944 Enid Blyton children's novel
- "Mystery Island", a song by Status Quo from the 2013 album Bula Quo!

== See also ==
- Mystery Islands 2006 trance music EP by Jani Kervinen
- Angry Birds Mystery Island, animated television series
- Manhunt of Mystery Island, 1945 American movie serial
- Kidnapped to Mystery Island, 1964 German–Italian film
- Mysterious Island (disambiguation)
