= Île Sans Nom =

Island in the Bay of Biscay, France

Nickname: Île Mystérieuse or Tahiti
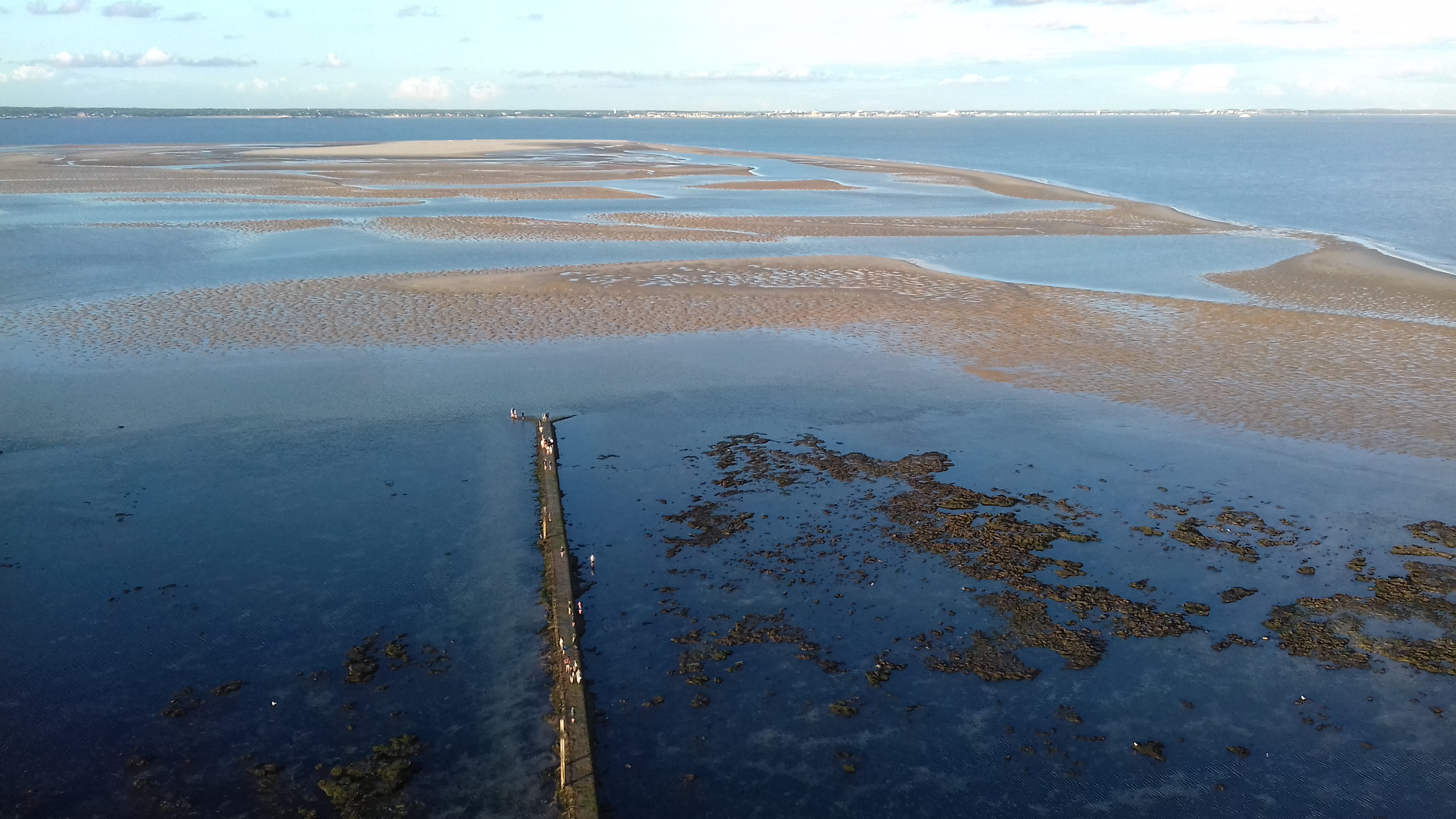
- A 2018 photograph of the island; in the left mid-distance

- Location within Poitou-Charentes

Geography
- Location: Gironde estuary
- Coordinates: 45°36′00″N 01°09′09″W

Administration
- France
- Department: Gironde

The Île Sans Nom (French: Island With No Name), also known as the Île Mystérieuse (Mysterious Island) or Tahiti, is an island in the Gironde estuary in south-west France. It appeared after the 2009 Cyclone Klaus led to increased deposition of sediment and lies near the historic Cordouan Lighthouse. It is regarded as an important emerging ecosystem and efforts have been made to protect the island from human intrusion. Officially it lies within the department of Gironde but in 2015 was occupied by a group claiming it for Charente-Maritime.

== 2009 appearance ==
The island, known as Île Sans Nom (French: island with no name), appeared after Cyclone Klaus struck the Gironde estuary on 23 January 2009. A European windstorm that progressed through France, Spain and Italy killing 26 people and causing widespread destruction, the cyclone caused rapid coastal erosion in Charente-Maritime. Some of the sediment accumulated in the estuary, adjacent to the Cordouan platform, the remains of an earlier limestone island since lost to erosion. The platform, partly exposed at low tide, is the site of France's oldest standing lighthouse, the 1611 Cordouan Lighthouse. The sediment augmented an existing sand bank approximately 1 mile (1.6 km) east of the lighthouse until it became a permanent fixture, visible at high tide.

Soon after it formed the island, lying at the boundary between the estuary and the Atlantic Ocean, was measured at 11 acres (4.5 ha) above high tide level and some 240 acres (97 ha) in the intertidal zone. Initially unclaimed by any local municipality the island came to be known as Île Sans Nom but was also named L'Île Mystérieuse by locals after the 1875 Jules Verne novel. It was considered possible at the time that the island would disappear as quickly as it had appeared, though some experts considered it could become permanent.

== Later history ==
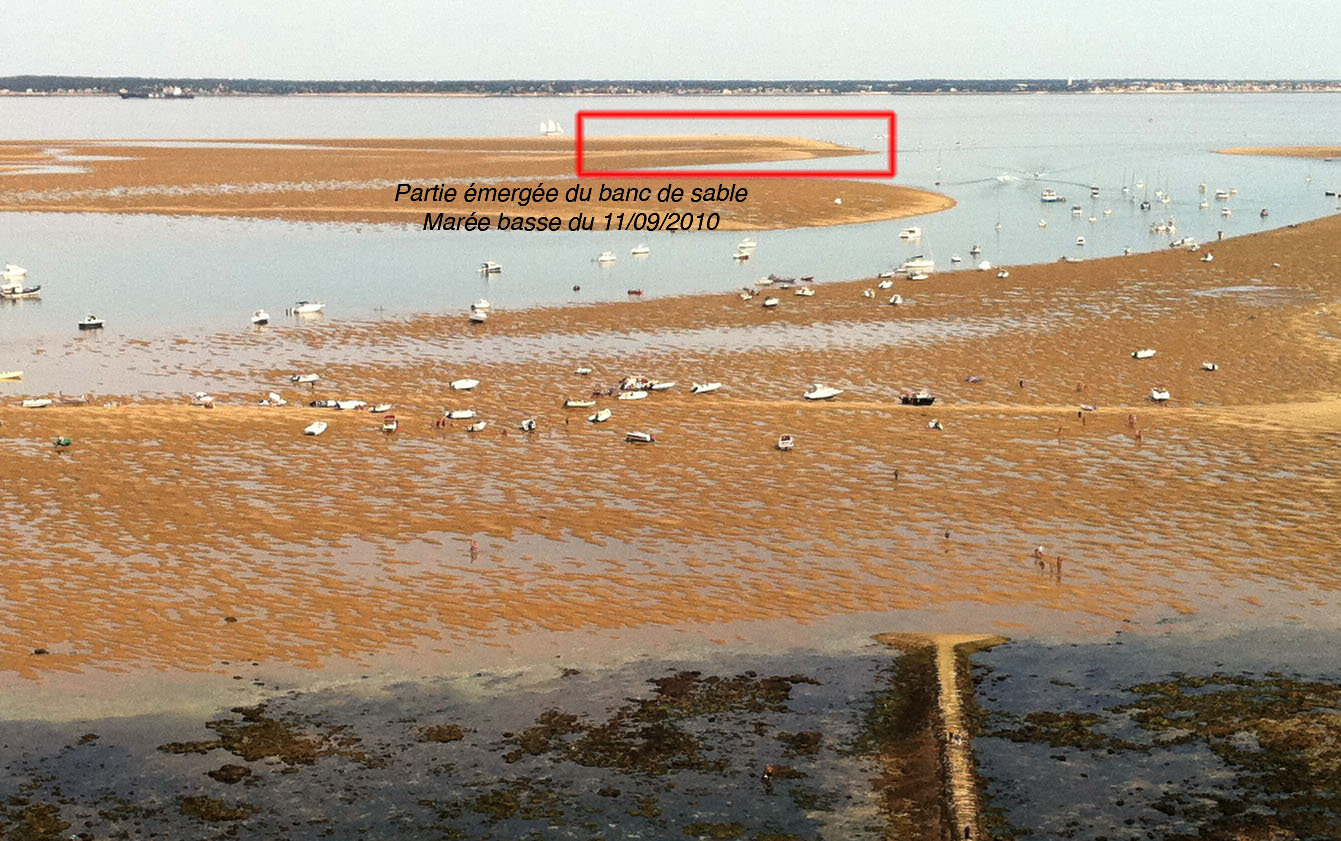
The island in 2010

The island offered ecologists an opportunity to study the development of a new ecosystem by colonising species, a rare experience in Europe as these are usually associated with new volcanic islands. Within months of its appearance the first plants, insects and gulls had arrived on the island and by 2010 12 plant species and 30 species of invertebrates were present, of which around a third were considered well established. The estuary is rich in marine life and lies on an important bird migration route. Quantities of sea rocket on the island provide sustenance for flies, who are preyed upon by invertebrates who also feed on debris left by the gulls. Spiders, blown across by the wind, and ants, travelling by driftwood, have also been recorded on the island.

The fragile ecosystem is vulnerable to trampling and has been placed at risk by human landings on the island. Several music parties, attended by hundreds of people, have disturbed nesting birds and the island has been used as a landing site by the local parachute club. Plans were made in 2011 to place the island under protection as part of a maritime conservation zone. The island was since brought within the commune of Le Verdon-sur-Mer in the Gironde department for administrative purposes.

The island survived Cyclone Xynthia in February 2010 but lost 3.5 acres (1.4 ha) of its surface area and was moved 50 metres (160 ft) east. On 5 October 2015 a group of 50 people landed on the island and claimed it for the department of Charente-Maritime. The group renamed the island "Tahiti" and an aircraft chartered to tow a banner reading "L’île Tahiti est aux Charentais" ("Tahiti island belongs to the Charentais"). The flag of the department was erected and the official song of the department sung. The island was recognised as a hazardous destination by the port authorities in nearby Royan, Charente-Maritime. A notice to mariners was issued in 2017 regarding the island and signs were erected on it requesting that people do not land on it.
