= Saint-Pierre-de-Vassols =

- Commune
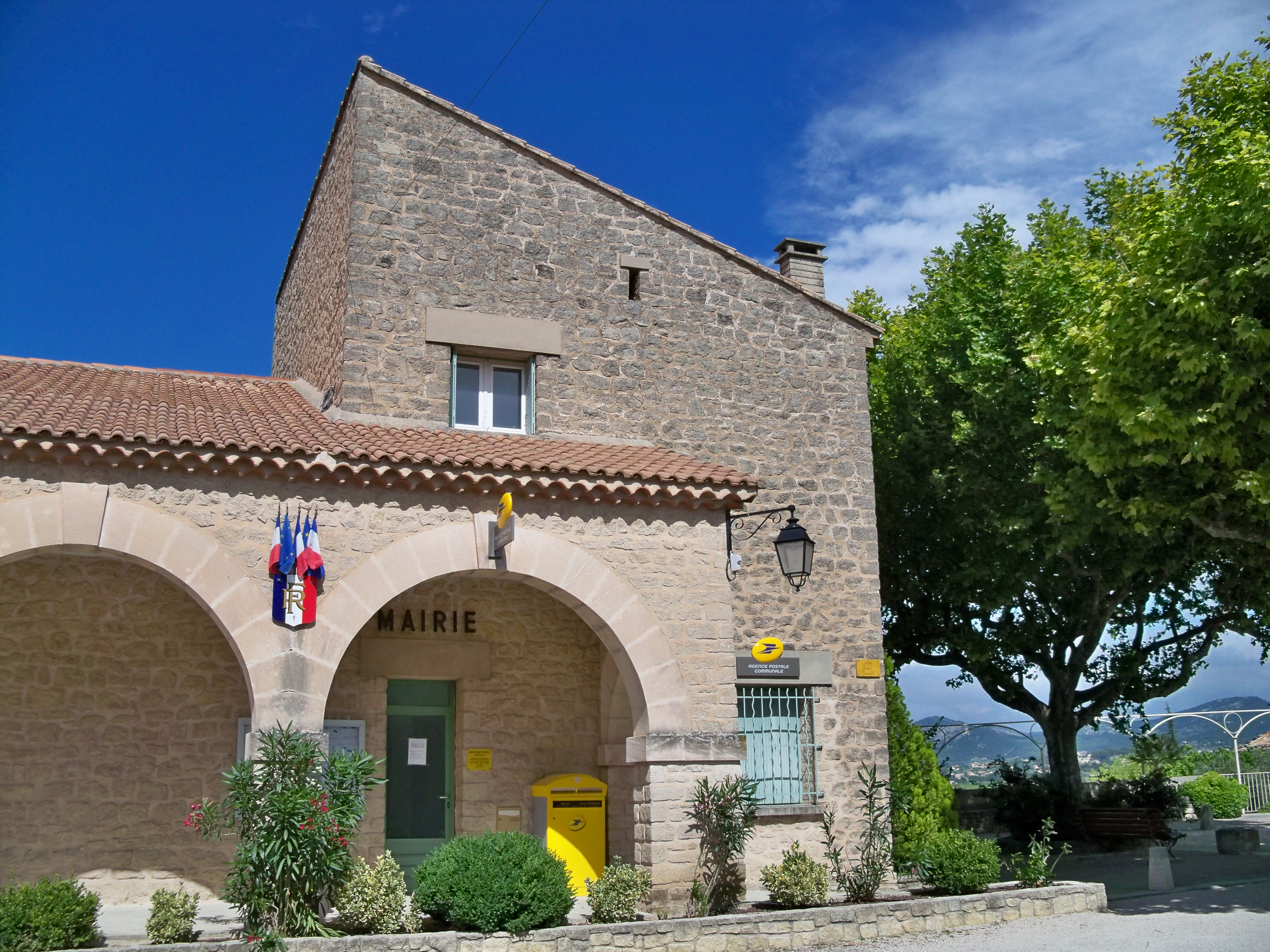
- Town hall

- Coat of arms
- Location of Saint-Pierre-de-Vassols
- Location within France Location within Provence-Alpes-Côte d'Azur
- Coordinates: 44°06′07″N 5°08′15″E
- Country: France
- Region: Provence-Alpes-Côte d'Azur
- Department: Vaucluse
- Arrondissement: Carpentras
- Canton: Pernes-les-Fontaines
- Intercommunality: CA Ventoux-Comtat Venaissin

Government
  - Mayor (2020–2026): Sandrine Raymond
- Area^{1}: 4.93 km^{2} (1.90 sq mi)
- Elevation: 212 m (696 ft)
- Highest elevation: 362 m (1,188 ft)
- Lowest elevation: 180 m (590 ft)
- Population (2023): 499
  - Density: 101/km^{2} (262/sq mi)
- Time zone: UTC+01:00 (CET)
  - Summer (DST): UTC+02:00 (CEST)
- INSEE/Postal code: 84115 /84330
- ^{1} French Land Register data, which excludes lakes, ponds, glaciers > 1 km^{2} (0.386 sq mi or 247 acres) and river estuaries.

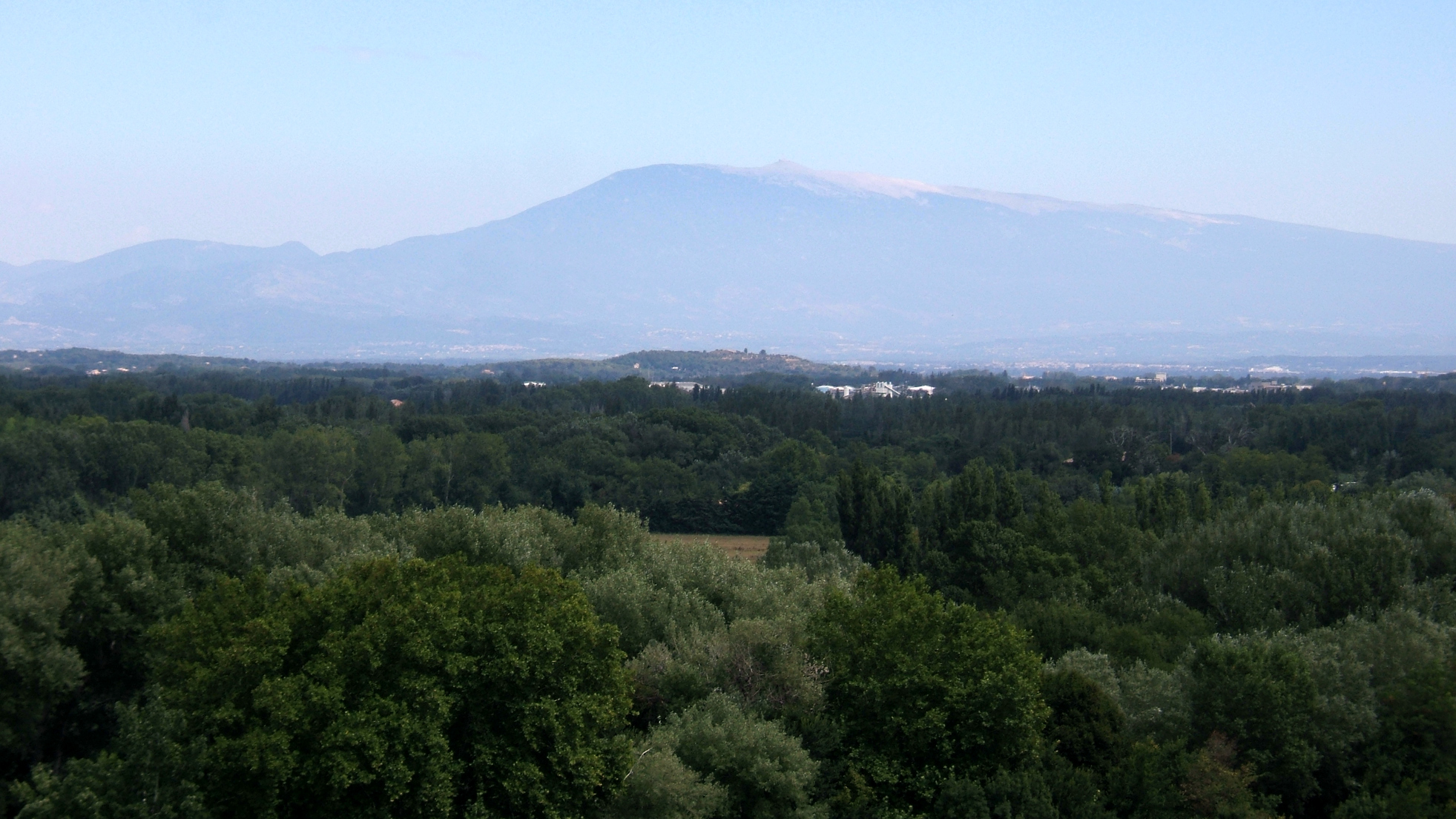
Mont Ventoux, view from Avignon 30 miles away

Saint-Pierre-de-Vassols (French pronunciation: [sɛ̃ pjɛʁ də vasɔl]; Provençal: Sant Pèire de Vassòus) is a commune in the Vaucluse département in the Provence-Alpes-Côte d'Azur region of southeastern France. Its inhabitants are known as vassoliens (male) and vassoliennes (female).

It is the birthplace of Blaise Francois Pagan (1603-1665), a French soldier and military engineer. His work, Les Fortifications, was the dominant text of its era on military fortifications and a significant influence on Sébastien Le Prestre de Vauban.

The village is located near Mont Ventoux, often used as a stage on the Tour de France. It is one of the toughest climbs in professional cycling, and British cyclist Tom Simpson died here in 1967. Other tourist attractions include a caravan site.

== See also ==
- Communes of the Vaucluse department
