= Cussac-Fort-Médoc =

French commune with UNESCO World Heritage Site

- Commune
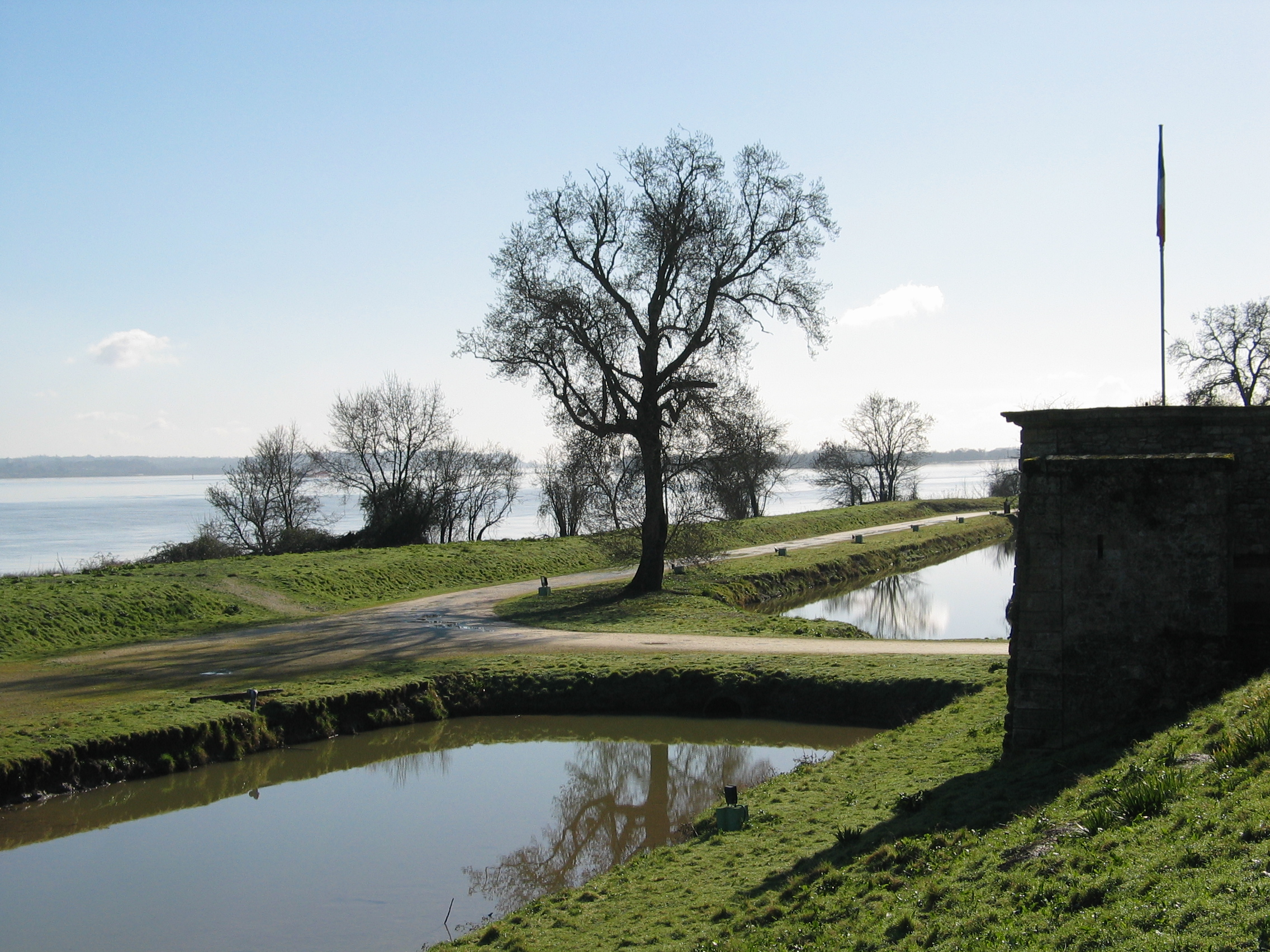
- Fort Médoc and the Gironde

- Coat of arms
- Location of Cussac-Fort-Médoc
- Location within France Location within Nouvelle-Aquitaine
- Coordinates: 45°06′53″N 0°43′47″W
- Country: France
- Region: Nouvelle-Aquitaine
- Department: Gironde
- Arrondissement: Lesparre-Médoc
- Canton: Le Sud-Médoc
- Intercommunality: Médoc Estuaire

Government
  - Mayor (2020–2026): Dominique Fedieu
- Area^{1}: 18.01 km^{2} (6.95 sq mi)
- Elevation: 19 m (62 ft)
- Highest elevation: 29 m (95 ft)
- Lowest elevation: 0 m (0 ft)
- Population (2023): 2,279
  - Density: 126.5/km^{2} (327.7/sq mi)
- Time zone: UTC+01:00 (CET)
  - Summer (DST): UTC+02:00 (CEST)
- INSEE/Postal code: 33146 /33460
- ^{1} French Land Register data, which excludes lakes, ponds, glaciers > 1 km^{2} (0.386 sq mi or 247 acres) and river estuaries.

Cussac-Fort-Médoc is a commune in the Gironde department in Nouvelle-Aquitaine in southwestern France.

Fort Médoc in Cussac-Fort-Médoc, together with several buildings in nearby Blaye, was listed in 2008 as a UNESCO World Heritage Site, as part of the "Fortifications of Vauban" group.

== Population ==
Historical population
Year	Pop.	±% p.a.
1968	792	—
1975	824	+0.57%
1982	1,101	+4.23%
1990	1,318	+2.27%
1999	1,355	+0.31%
2007	1,743	+3.20%
2012	2,071	+3.51%
2017	2,240	+1.58%
2023	2,279	+0.29%
Source: INSEE

== See also ==
- Communes of the Gironde department
