= Blaise François Pagan =

French military engineer

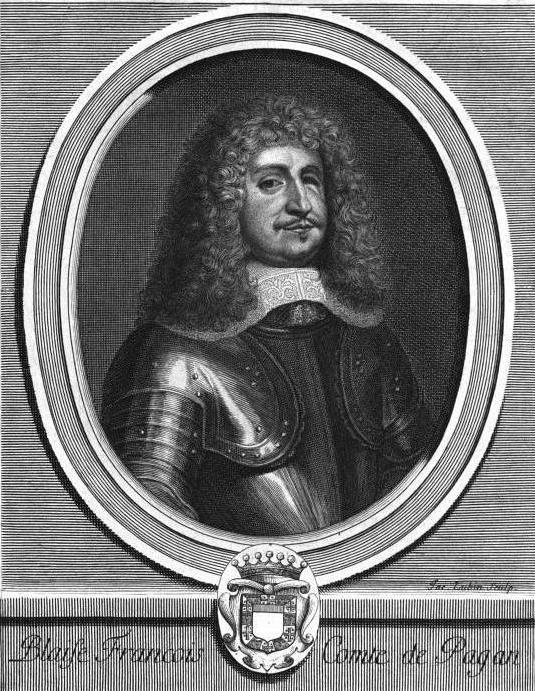
- Blaise François Pagan
- Born: 3 March 1604; Saint-Pierre-de-Vassols, Provence, France
- Died: 18 November 1665 (aged 61); Bastille Paris
- Burial place: Church of Saint Antoine-des-Champs
- Military career
- Allegiance: France
- Branch: Soldier and Engineer
- Service years: 1616-1642
- Rank: Maréchal de camp 1642
- Conflicts: Huguenot rebellions 1620-1629; Montauban 1622 La Rochelle 1628-1629; Mantuan Succession 1628-1631; Franco-Spanish War 1635-1659; Saint-Omer 1638 Arras 1640 Bapaume 1641

Blaise François Pagan (French: [blɛz fʁɑ̃swa paɡɑ̃]; 1603–1665) was a French soldier and military engineer who served in the army of Louis XIII. His military career ended in 1642 when he lost his sight and in 1645, he published Les Fortifications; this became the dominant text of its era on military fortifications and significantly influenced Sébastien Le Prestre de Vauban.

During the 1650 to 1653 Fronde des nobles, Pagan allegedly claimed "he would make the King (Louis XIV) die by magic" and was imprisoned in the Bastille, where he died in 1665.

== Life ==
Blaise François Pagan was born in the village of Saint-Pierre-de-Vassols, then in Provence-Alpes-Côte d'Azur, now part of the modern French department of Vaucluse. His exact date of birth is uncertain but he was baptised on 4 March 1604, a ceremony that normally took place several months later.

His father Claude was descended from a Neapolitan family that moved to France in 1552 and was a cadet branch of the d'Albert family, headed by the duc de Luynes. Pagan never married and died childless.

== Career ==
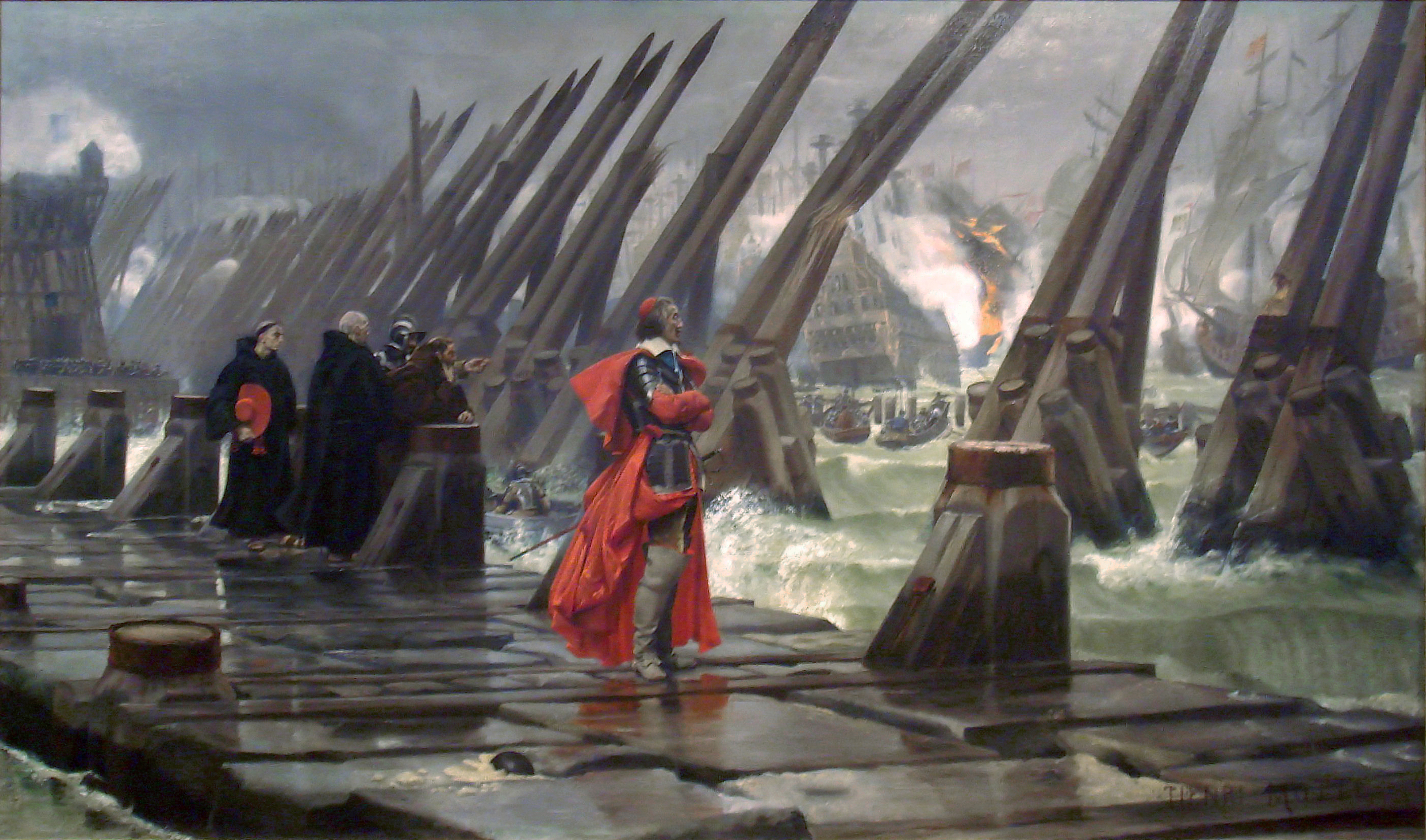
Cardinal Richelieu at the 1628 Siege of La Rochelle; Pagan was part of the besieging force

The 1590 Edict of Nantes ended the French Wars of Religion but the assassination of Henry IV in 1610 once again destabilised the country. The first part of the reign of Louis XIII (1601-1643) was marked by domestic conflict, including a series of Huguenot rebellions in the 1620s. Pagan began his military career during the 1620-1622 Huguenot Rebellion and was promoted by Louis' first chief minister and his relative, the Charles d'Albert, duc de Luynes. He took part in a number of sieges, including that of Montauban in 1621, where he lost an eye and his patron Luynes died of fever.

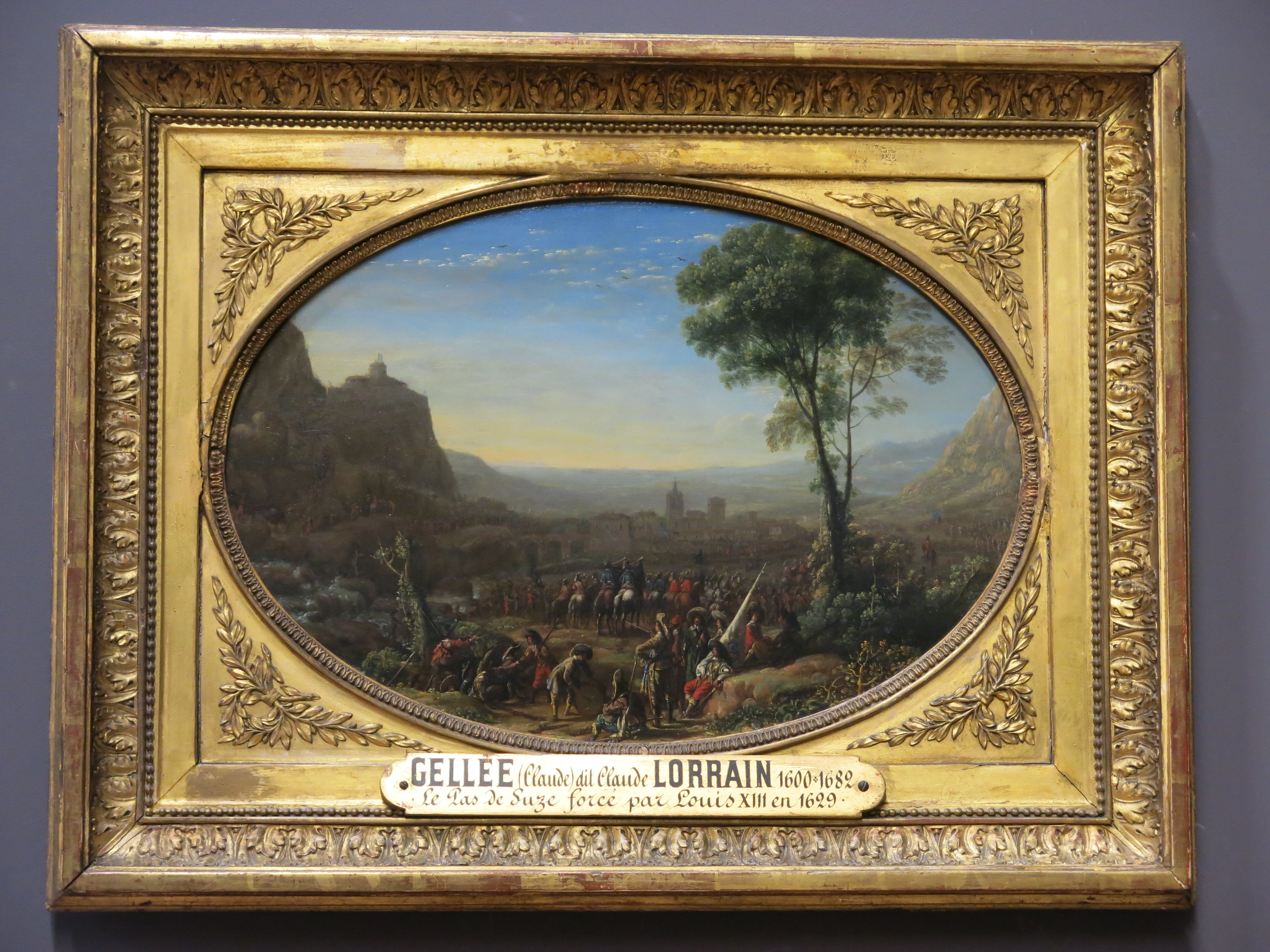
Storming the Susa pass by Claude Lorrain; Pagan took part in what was a famous feat of arms

Cardinal Richelieu replaced Luynes and after a short pause following the 1622 Treaty of Montpellier, fighting restarted in 1624. Among other actions, Pagan took part in the 1627/1628 Siege of La Rochelle, whose loss resulted in the 1629 Peace of Alès, ending Huguenot self-government within France. Richelieu's policies were driven not by religion but to increase Royal authority over the often autonomous French nobility and reduce the power of Spain.

As part of this anti-Spanish policy, France supported the Protestant Dutch Republic in its Eighty Years War against Catholic Spain; Turenne, one of the most celebrated generals of the 17th century, was a Huguenot who began his career fighting for the Dutch. France also became involved in the 1628-1631 War of the Mantuan Succession, in opposition to the Spanish-backed candidate; in March 1629, Pagan was part of a force that stormed barricades blocking the Pas de Suse, an act celebrated for its courage.

Many of the actions involving Pagan were commanded by his fellow Provencal and Governor of Languedoc, the duc de Montmorency, who was executed in 1632 for treason. However, he was closely involved in the capture and occupation of Nancy in September 1633, when France invaded the Duchy of Lorraine, then ruled by the pro-Spanish Charles IV.

Increasingly close links between France and the Dutch Republic led to a formal alliance in August 1634, followed by the outbreak of the 1635-1659 Franco-Spanish War. Pagan fought in many of the actions associated with this war, including Saint-Quentin, Landrecies, Saint-Omer, Arras and finally Bapaume in 1641.

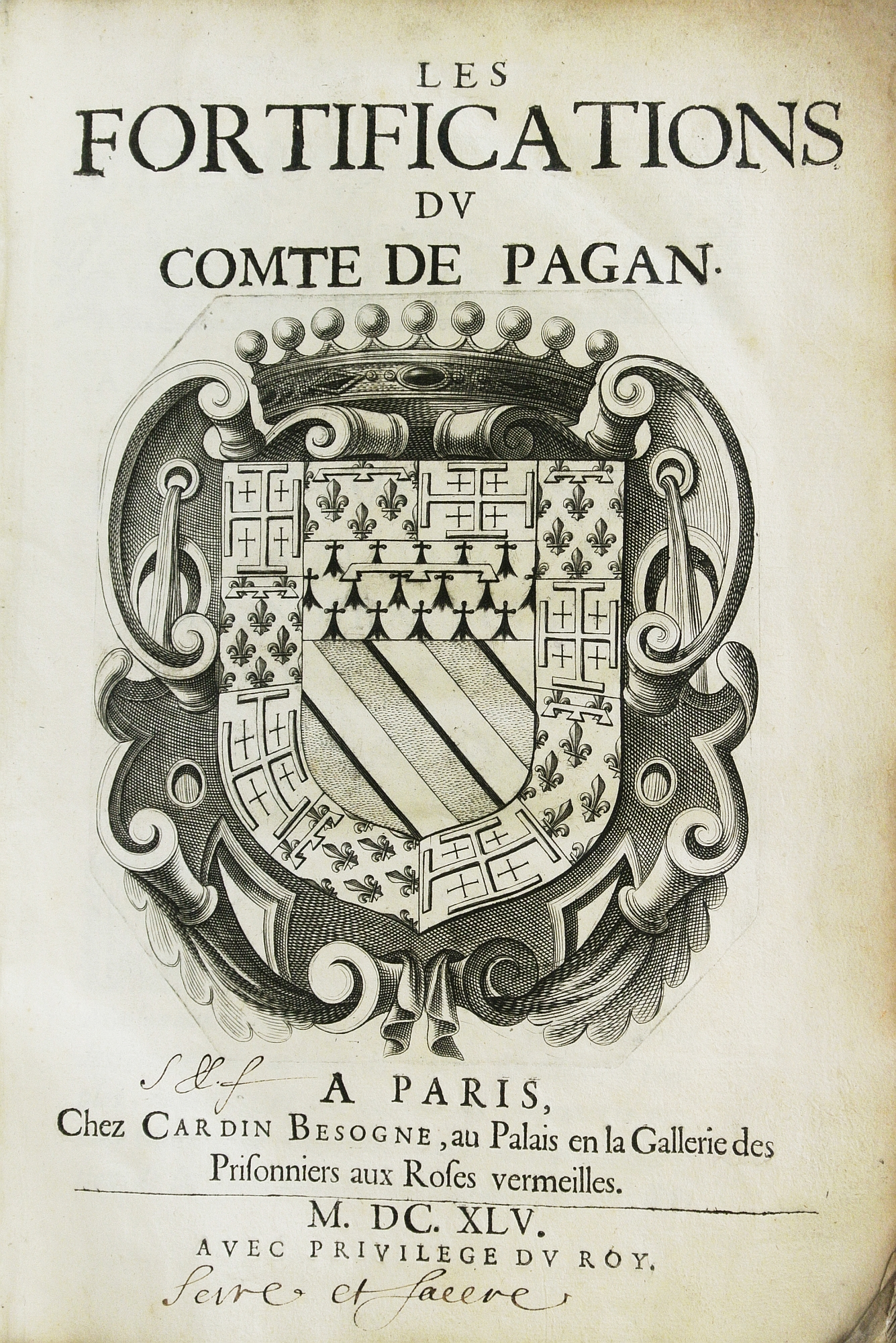
Cover page of Pagan's work Les fortifications published in Paris, 1645

In 1640, Portugal declared its independence from Spain, initiating the Restoration War, which was supported by France. Pagan was promoted Maréchal de camp in 1642 and assigned to the Portuguese army but before taking up this post, he was blinded in an accident, ending his military career. Pagan was invited by the Knights Hospitaller to submit a proposal for fortifying their base at Malta; this does not appear to have been accepted but in 1645, he published Les Fortifications.

The increasing power of artillery during the 16th century required a complete rethink on the design of fortifications. Much of the original work was done by Italian engineers and the famous 'star-shape' bastion fort design, used in various forms until the mid-19th century, was known as the trace Italienne. These were then upgraded by French engineers, including Jean Errard (1554-1610) and Antoine de Ville (1596-1656); unlike them, Pagan's work was almost entirely theoretical but his background in geometry and mathematics allowed him to apply their concepts in a more structured way. This included where to locate outworks or exposed bastions to slow down an attack and how to adapt designs to the terrain; the principles he outlined were all used by Vauban in his 'first system.'

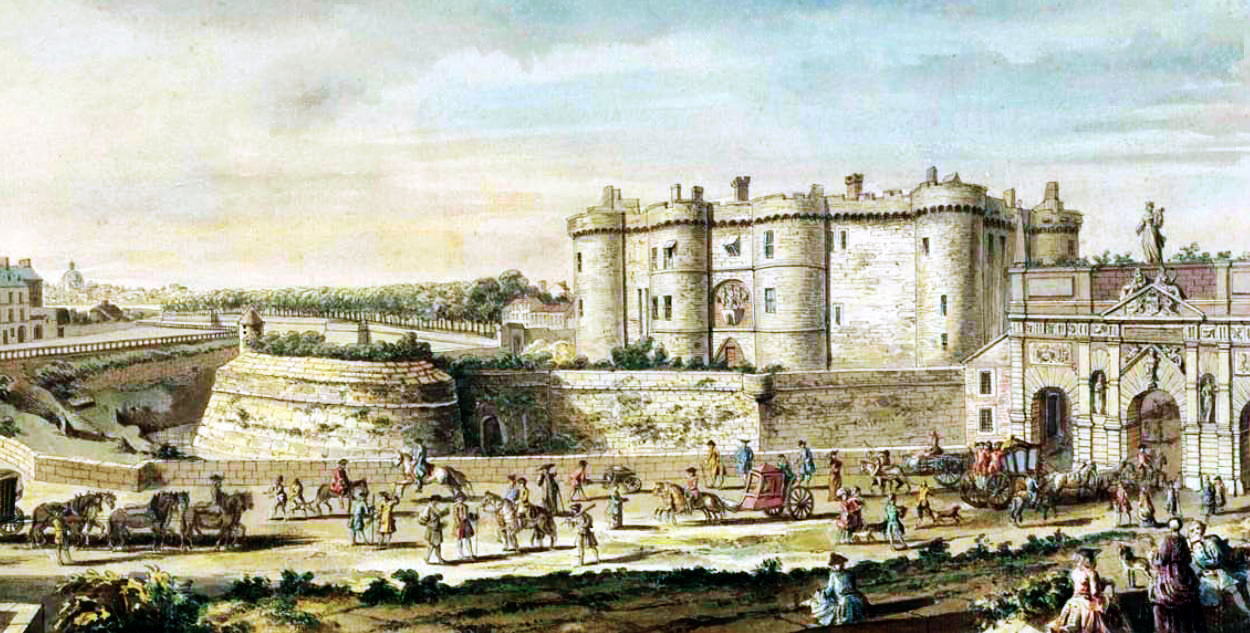
The Bastille ca 1715, where Pagan was imprisoned 1652-1665

The death of Louis XIII in 1643 and the succession of the five year old Louis XIV led to a power struggle between the French nobility and the Royalist party, headed by Anne of Austria and Cardinal Mazarin. During the 1650-1653 Fronde des nobles in 1652, he allegedly claimed 'he would make the King (Louis XIV) die by magic.' Combined with his connections to Montmorency and Louis' uncle Gaston, duc d'Orléans, this resulted in a sentence of eight years imprisonment in the Bastille; Mazarin offered him the option of expulsion from France, but Pagan insisted on 'unconditional release' and appears to have been forgotten after Mazarin died in 1661.

He spent his captivity studying and publishing works on various topics, including mathematics (Théorèmes géométriques), astronomy (Théorèmes des planètes, Les Tables astronomiques, and Astrologie naturelle) and even geography (Relation de la rivière des Amazones). His last letter from the Bastille was written on 18 November 1665 and he appears to have died soon after; he was buried in the church of Saint-Antoine-des-Champs, destroyed during the French Revolution.

== Sources ==
- Le Page, Jean-Denis (20 October 2009). Vauban and the French Military Under Louis XIV: An Illustrated History of Fortifications and Strategies. McFarland.;
- Parrott, David (2008). Richelieu's Army: War, Government and Society in France, 1624-1642. CUP. ISBN 978-0521025485.;
- Perrault, Charles (1697). Les Hommes illustres qui ont paru en France pendant ce siècle; Volume I. Antoine Dezallier.;
- Ravaisson, Francois (1870). Archives de la Bastille Volume II. Durand & Pedone-Lauriel.;
- Thion, Stéphane (2013). French Armies of the Thirty Years' War. Histoire et Collections. ISBN 978-2917747018.;
- Van Nimwegen, Olaf (2010). The Dutch Army and the Military Revolutions, 1588-1688. Boydell Press. ISBN 978-1843835752.;
- Zagorin, Perez (1982). Rebels and Rulers, 1500–1660: Volume 2, Provincial Rebellion: Provincial Rebellion, Revolutionary Civil Wars, 1560-1660 v. 2. Cambridge University Press. ISBN 978-0521244732.;
