= Fort Paté =

Coordinates: 45°07′04″N 0°40′43″W

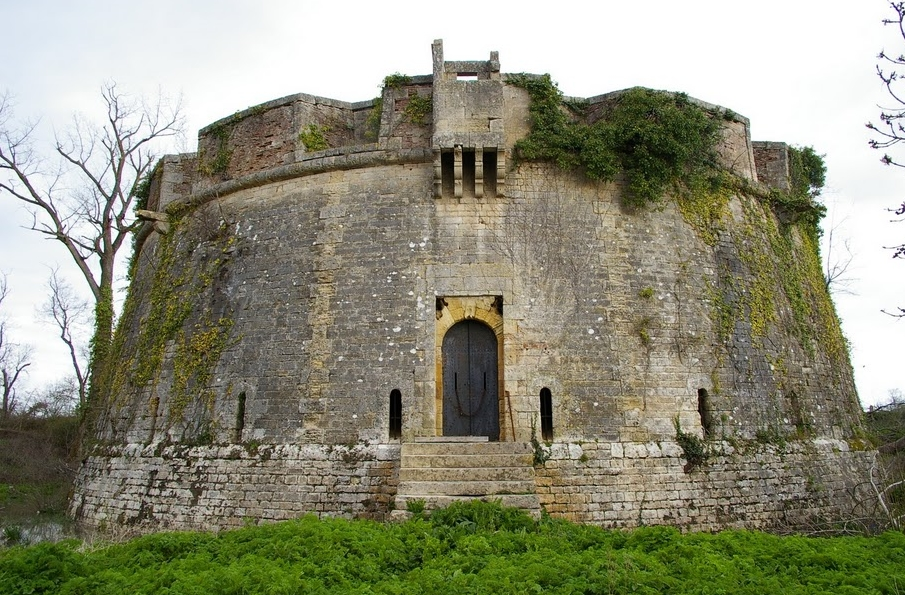
Fort pâté

Fort Paté is a round, tower-like Vauban fort on Paté Island in the Gironde estuary, Nouvelle-Aquitaine, France. It, with its twin Fort Médoc on the mainland and the citadel of Blaye, protected Bordeaux from attack by sea. With them, it was listed as a UNESCO World Heritage Site in 2008 as one of the fortifications of Vauban, bearing witness to the importance of Vauban's work in the history and of military architecture in the 17th and 18th centuries.
