= Citadel de Blaye =

Historic site in France

- France
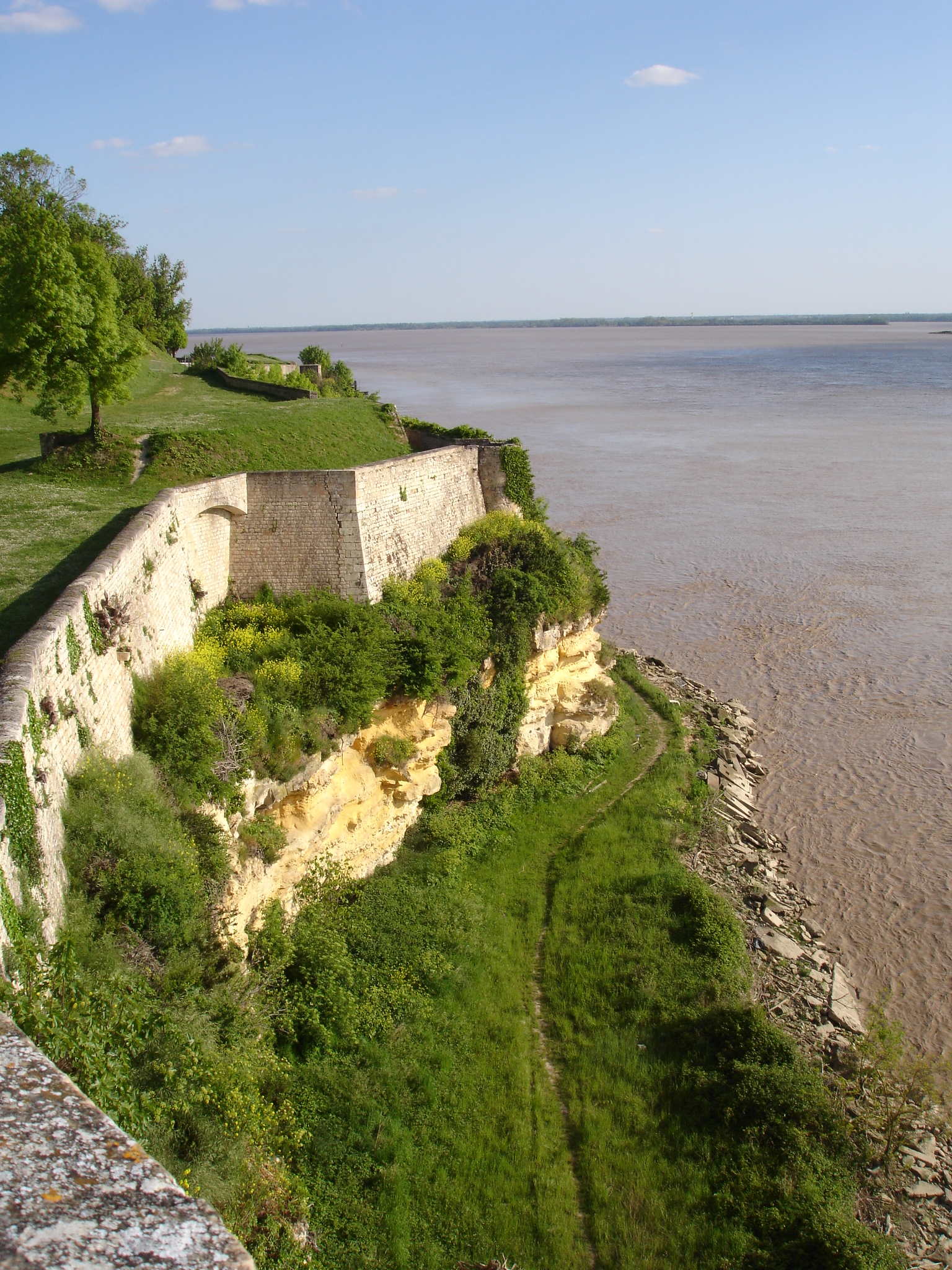

Site information
- Type: Castle
- Open to the public: yes

Location
- Coordinates: 45.128889°N 0.666389°W

The Citadel de Blaye (French: Citadelle de Blaye) is a 25-hectare military complex built between 1685 and 1689 by military engineer François Ferry, director general fortifications of Guyenne, under the supervision of Vauban.

It was fully classified as a monument historique on 11 May 2009, and is also one of the twelve sites integrated into the Vauban major sites network and was therefore registered on July 7, 2008 on the list of world heritage sites by UNESCO.

== History ==
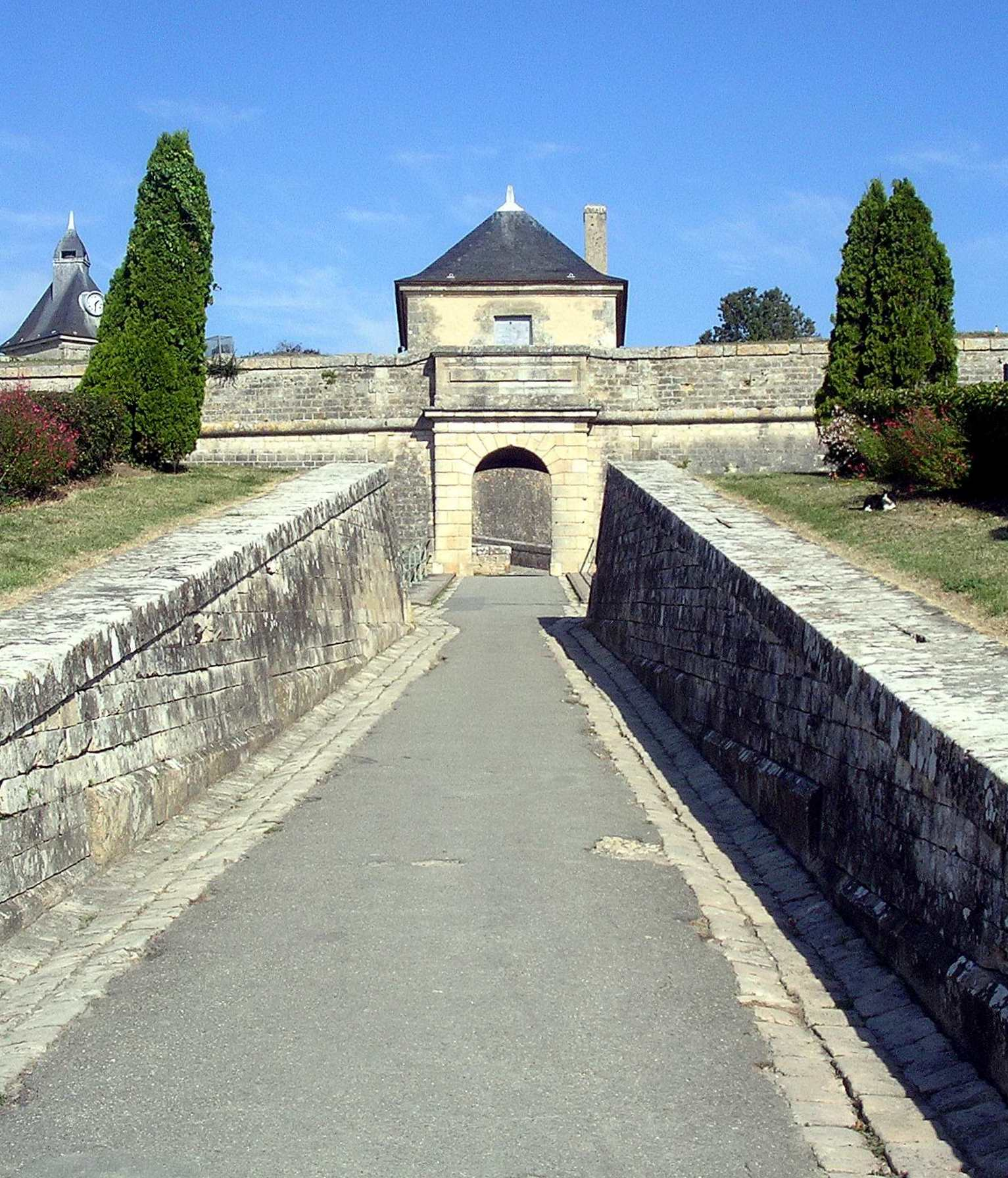
The Dauphine Gate (1689) is, along with the royal gate, one of the two entrances to the citadel

=== Bastioned fortification ===
In fact, while an initial fortification campaign took place as early as 1652, under the direction of the military engineer Blaise François Pagan, the construction of the current citadel stemmed from the desire of the "Sun King" to establish a strong defensive line on the Gironde estuary, as part of a general plan to protect the coastline. This also allowed for control of river navigation in order to "keep Bordeaux in line should it ever act foolishly.""

The citadel's construction was subsequently supervised by the marshal Vauban, with the execution of the work being entrusted to the military engineer François Ferry. He was assisted in his task by several assistants: first Charles Thuillier, from 1685 to 1690, then Jean-Baptiste Augier from 1686 to 1691, and finally Pierre Jablier - the nephew of François Ferry - from 1688 to 1705.

=== Demilitarization ===
In 2008, the citadel was listed as a UNESCO World Heritage Site within the serial property of the Fortifications of Vauban.

== Description ==
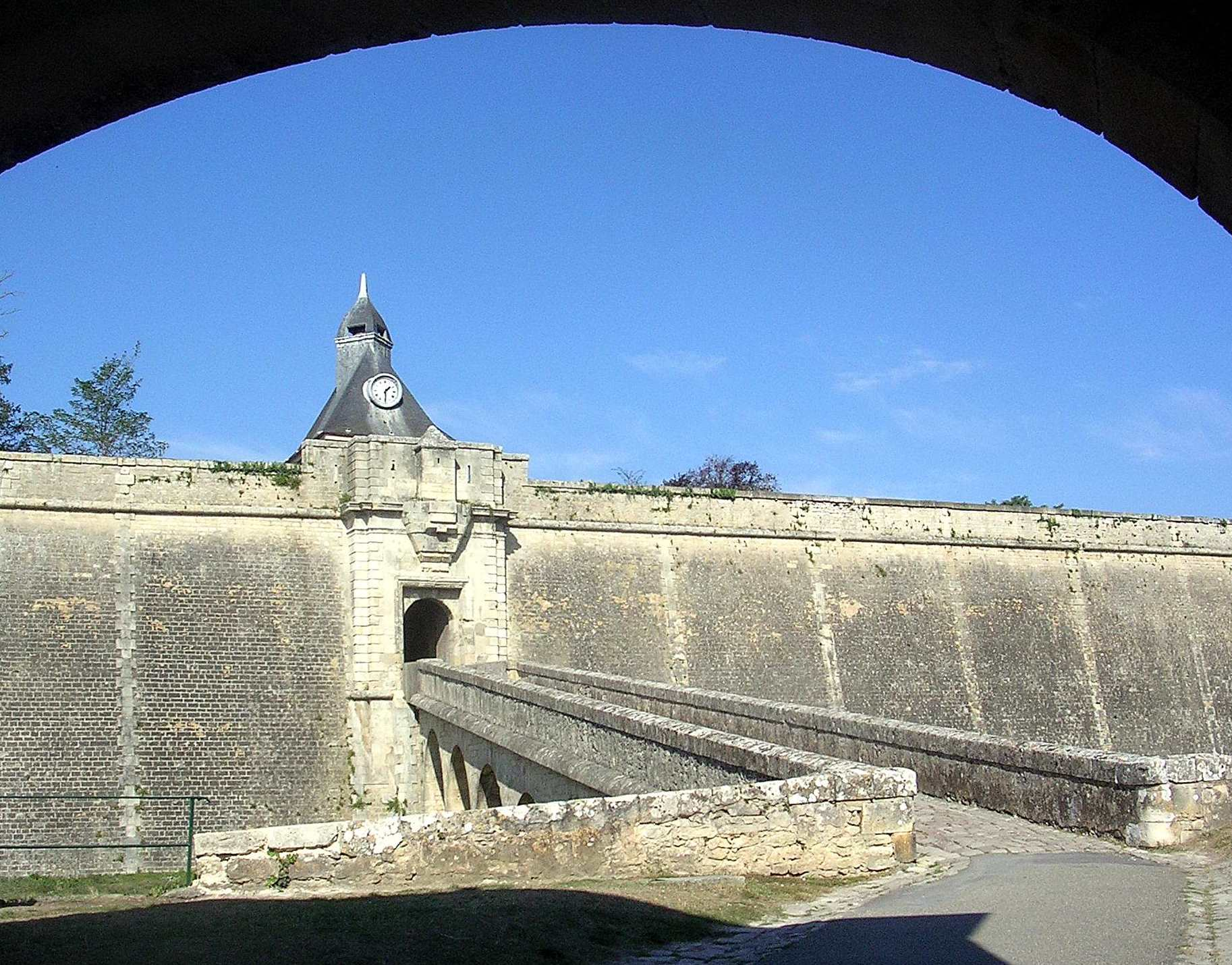
The Dauphine gate is preceded by a fixed bridge built in 1770.

The handling building also houses an estuary museum managed by the estuary conservatory.
