= Gironde estuary =

Largest estuary in Western Europe

Coordinates: 45°16′01″N 0°42′39″W

Gironde
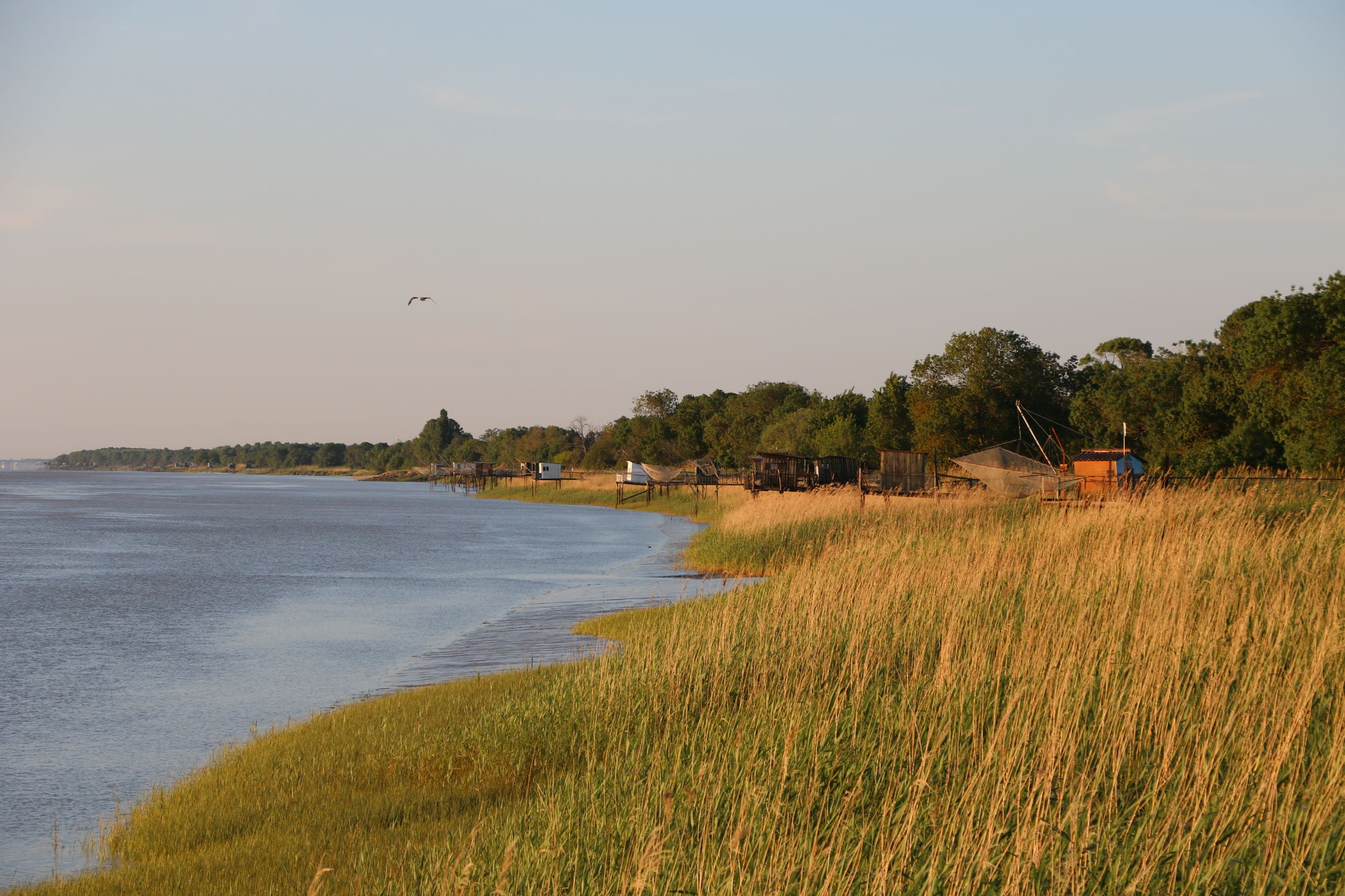
- The Gironde estuary in Pauillac

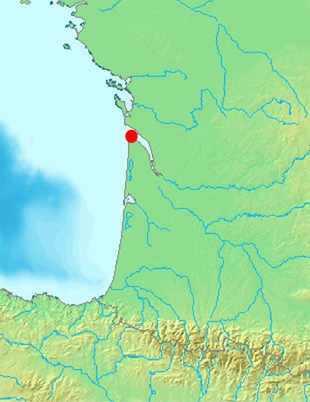
- Map of France with the Gironde highlighted

Location
- Country: France
- Region: Nouvelle-Aquitaine

Physical characteristics
- Mouth: Atlantic Ocean
- Length: 75 km (47 mi)
- Basin size: 635 km^{2} (245 sq mi)
- Width
  - minimum: 3 km (1.9 mi)
  - maximum: 12 km (7.5 mi)

Basin features
- Progression: Corrèze → Vézère→ Dordogne→ Gironde estuary→ Atlantic Ocean
- Tributaries
  - left: Garonne
  - right: Dordogne

The Gironde estuary (/ʒɪˈrɒnd/ zhih-ROND, US also /dʒɪˈ-/ jih-; French: estuaire de la Gironde [ɛstɥɛʁ də la ʒiʁɔ̃d]; Occitan: estuari de [la] Gironda [estyˈaɾi ˈde lo dʒiˈɾundo]) is a navigable estuary (though often referred to as a river) in southwest France, formed from the meeting of the rivers Dordogne and Garonne just downstream from the centre of Bordeaux. Covering around 635 km^{2} (245 sq mi), it is the largest estuary in Western Europe.

Giving its name to the French département Gironde, the Gironde estuary is approximately 75 km (47 mi) long and 3–12 km (1.9–7.5 mi) wide. It is subject to very strong tidal currents and great care is needed when navigating the estuary by any size or type of boat.

Since 2015, the Gironde estuary has been part of the Gironde estuary and Pertuis sea Marine Nature Park.

== Islands of the Gironde ==
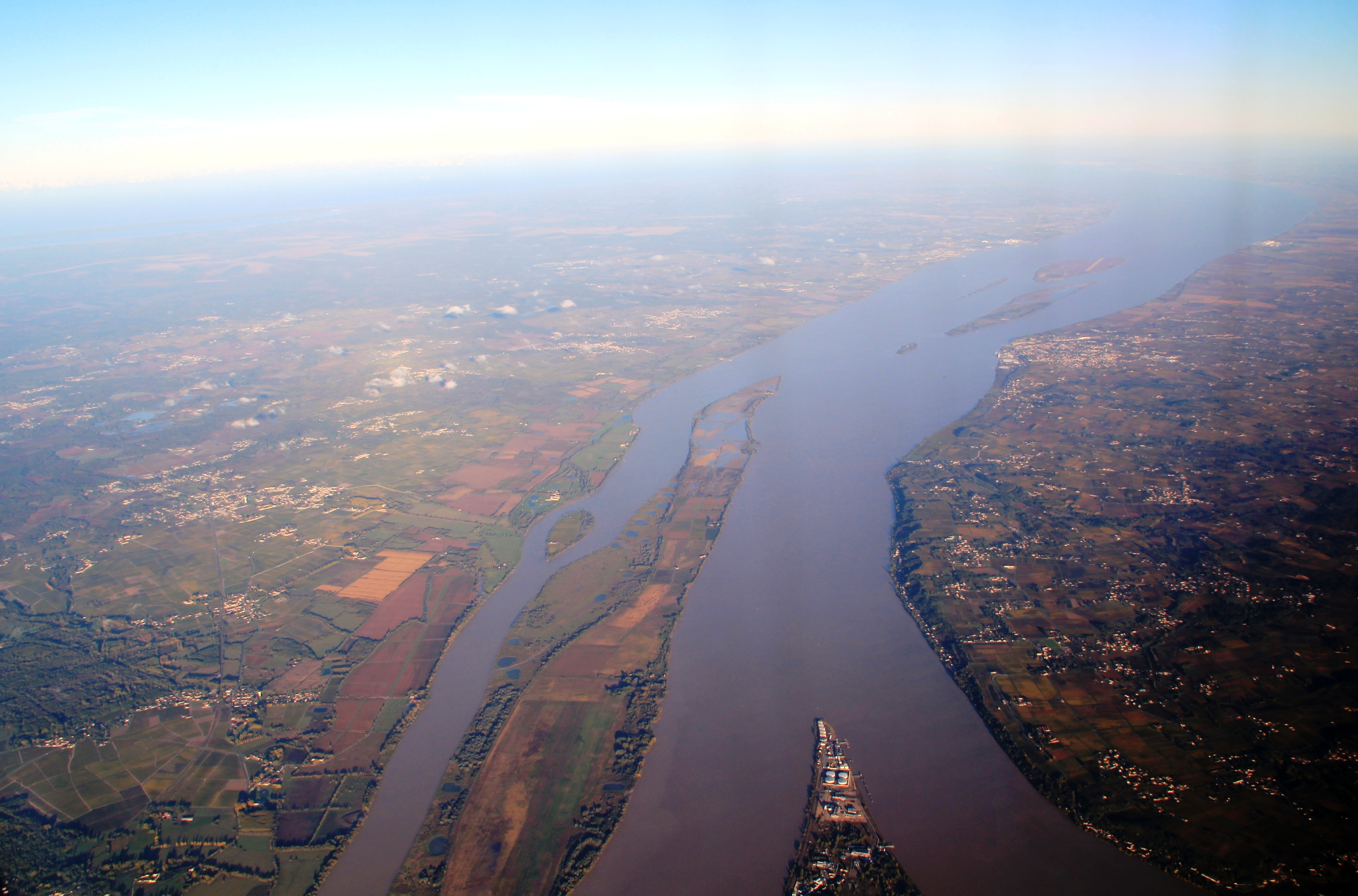
Islands of the Gironde at the Bec d'Ambès where the rivers Dordogne (right) and Garonne (left) join into the estuary. The long finger of Île Cazeau is prominent to the left.

Within the estuary between the Pointe de Grave at the seaward end and the Bec d'Ambès are a series of small islands.

The Île de Patiras is 200 hectares (490 acres) in size with a lighthouse to aid navigation in the estuary. Vines and maize are grown there.

The Île Sans-Pain and Île Bouchaud are now virtually joined due to progressive silting and are referred to as the Île Nouvelle. They total about 265 hectares (650 acres) and are owned by the Conservatoire du Littoral and managed by the Department of the Gironde.

The Île Paté is about 13 hectares (32 acres) and in 2006 was privately owned. The island has a historic fort built between 1685 and 1693 as part of the national fortification program masterminded by Vauban. The building is oval in shape, about 12 metres (39 ft) high and was originally equipped with about 30 cannons. Fort Paté, together with Fort Médoc on the left bank of the estuary and the ancient citadelle of Blaye on the right bank, defended the estuary and Bordeaux. During the French Revolution the fort was used as a prison for priests.

In 2006, the Conseil General decided to make the island a ZPENS (zone de pre-emption espace naturel sensible). ZPENS status protects the island from development. If the owner wishes to sell the island, then the department has a pre-emptive right. After two months the Conservatoire National du Littoral has the next pre-emptive right and then after another 2 months the town of Blaye has a final pre-emptive right to acquire the island.

The Île Verte, Île du Nord and Île Cazeau comprise about 800 hectares (2,000 acres) and because of their natural state provide a fine stopping off place for migrating birds.

The Île Margaux is 25 hectares (62 acres) and in 2005 had 14 hectares (35 acres) devoted to vines and is part of the world famous Médoc wine region.

The Île Sans Nom which appeared in 2009 following Cyclone Klaus lies around 1.6 kilometres (1 mi) east of Cordouan Lighthouse.

== Second World War ==
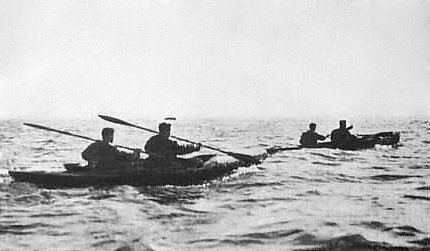
The Mark II canoes used in Operation Frankton, the British attack on Bordeaux in 1942

In December 1942, during the Second World War, Operation Frankton took place with the goal of destroying ships moored at the docks in Bordeaux.

The plan was for six canoes to be taken to the area of the Gironde estuary by submarine. Twelve men would then paddle by night to Bordeaux. On arrival they would attach timed limpet mines to the docked cargo ships and escape overland to Spain.

The raid was carried out by a small unit of Royal Marines known as the Royal Marines Boom Patrol Detachment (RMBPD), part of Combined Operations, led by Herbert 'Blondie' Hasler. They succeeded in slipping into the harbour unnoticed and sank one ship and severely damaged four others. Only two of the men returned to the UK alive, but they did enough damage to greatly disrupt the use of the harbour for the following months.

The prototypes of the Char B1 ter heavy tank were lost in the Gironde as a result of German bombing in 1940.
