= Tahitian =

Tahitian or Tahitians may refer to:

- someone or something from or associated with the island of Tahiti
  - Tahitians, people with an indigenous Tahitian or ethnic identity
  - Tahitian language, an Eastern Polynesian language used as a lingua franca in much of French Polynesia
  - Tahitian mythology, their ancient folk religion
