= Cyclone Klaus =

2009 windstorm over southern and southwestern Europe

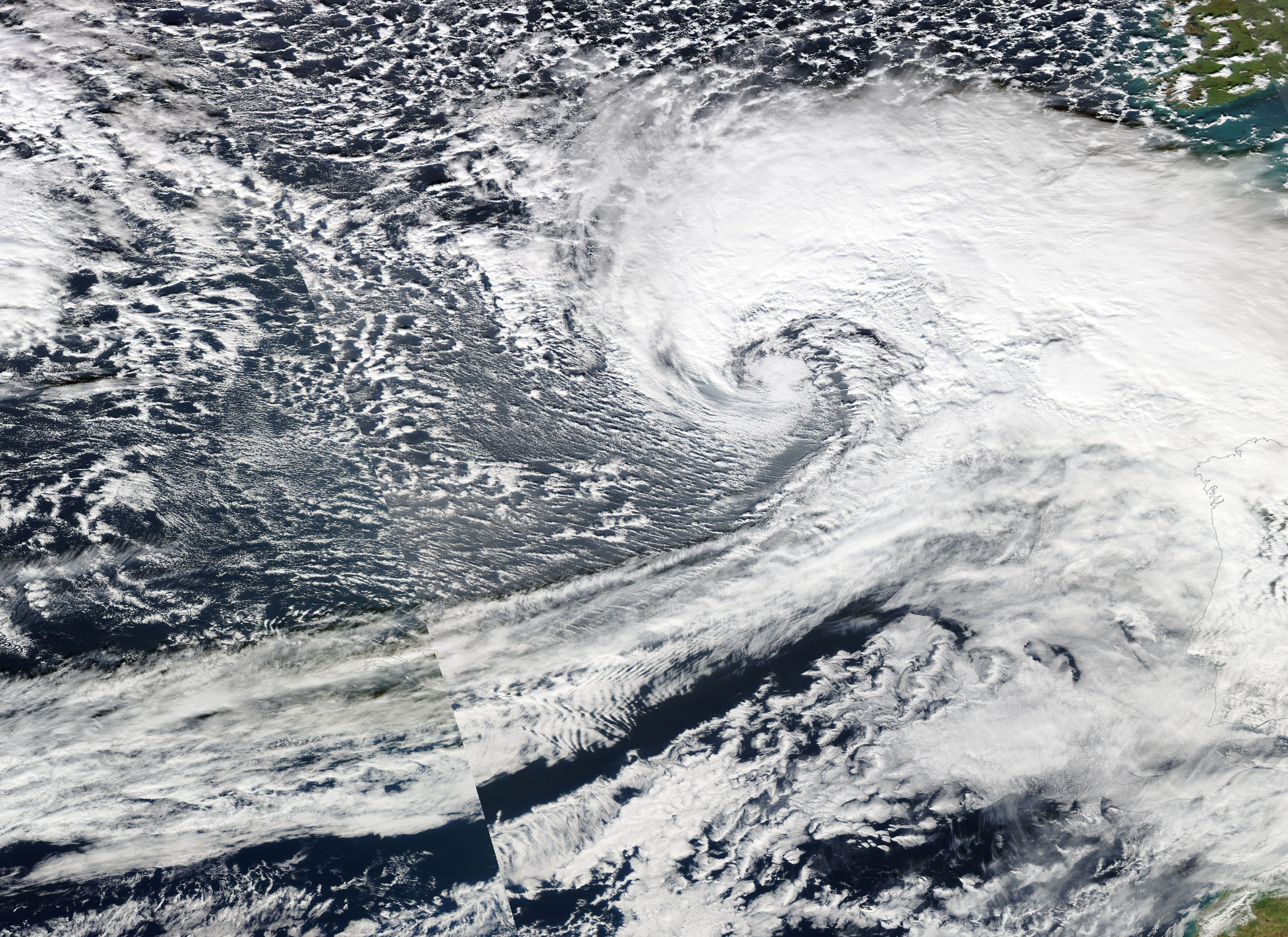
- Klaus strengthening over the Atlantic Ocean on 23 January 2009

Meteorological history
- Formed: January 23, 2009
- Dissipated: January 28, 2009

Extratropical cyclone
- Highest gusts: 216 km/h (134 mph) Port d'Envalira, Andorra
- Lowest pressure: 958 mb (28.3 inHg)

Overall effects
- Fatalities: 26
- Areas affected: Andorra, France, Germany, Italy, Spain, Switzerland

Cyclone Klaus was a European windstorm or cyclone that made landfall over large parts of central and southern France, Spain and parts of Italy in January 2009. The storm was the most damaging since Lothar and Martin in December 1999. The storm caused widespread damage across France and Spain, especially in northern Spain.

The storm caused twenty-six fatalities, as well as extensive disruptions to public transport and power supplies, with approximately 1.7 million homes in southwest France and tens of thousands of homes in Spain experiencing power cuts. Severe damage to property and major forest damage occurred. Peak gusts were over 200 km/h (120 mph); sustained winds over 170 km/h (110 mph) were observed, which are hurricane-force winds.

== Profile ==
The storm made landfall near Bordeaux, France, at 5:00 am Central European Time on Saturday, 24 January. It traveled southeastwards towards the south-east coast of France throughout Saturday morning, finally reaching there at 1:00 pm. It continued eastwards over Italy, but without causing significant damage. Low pressure systems are regarded as fairly common in Europe at that time of year. Some reports called it the storm of the decade; BBC meteorologist Alex Deakin said, "Saturday's storm is being described as the most damaging since that of December 1999 which killed 88 people."

Michèle Alliot-Marie, the French interior minister, stated that in addition to the 300 civil security agents located in the Landes region of France, another 715 agents would be deployed. In Bordeaux's Gironde region, 19 residents of a retirement home were evacuated by rescuers after the rooftop blew away. Authorities also evacuated campers from the pine forests in Les Landes.

Thousands were evacuated from nearby housing estates in La Nucía, north of Benidorm in Alicante, as the Spanish Army helped to fight a forest fire, which was started by a felled electricity pylon. There were also wildfires in the region of Catalonia, while Spain put emergency services on high alert. Waves over 20 metres high were registered off the northern coast of Spain and dolphins were stranded on beaches in the region as a result of high winds.

The storm left millions without electricity mobile telephone, including 1-1-2.

== Highest winds ==
Country	Place	Speed (km/h)	Speed (mph)	Country	Place	Speed (km/h)	Speed (mph)
France	Formiguères (66)	193	120	Andorra	Port d'Envalira	216	134
France	Port-Vendres (66)	191	119	Spain	Portbou	200	120
France	Mont Aigoual (30)	185	115	Spain	Cerezo de Arriba	198	123
France	Perpignan (66)	184	114	Spain	Machichaco	193	120
France	Biscarosse (40)	172	107	Spain	Malpica	183	114
France	Bordeaux (33)	161	100	Spain	Ocón	183	114

== Casualties ==
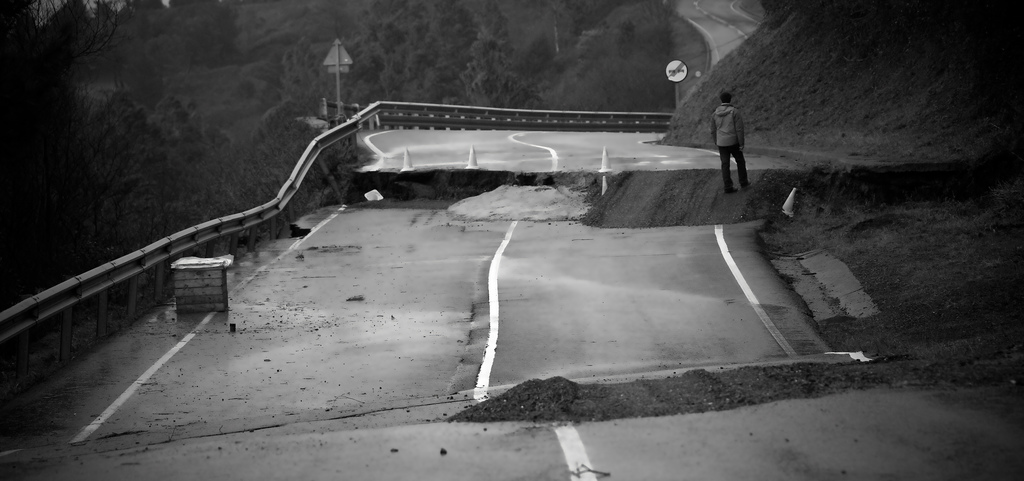
A damaged road in Bakio, Basque Country

=== Spain ===
Parts of a sports center collapsed in Sant Boi de Llobregat, 11 kilometers (6.8 mi) south west of Barcelona, killing four children and injuring 16. In Burela, Galicia, a policeman was killed by a falling tree as he was directing traffic. In La Palma de Cervelló, Province of Barcelona, a road worker was killed by a falling tree. A woman died when a wall collapsed in Barcelona. A man was also killed by a collapsed wall in Aigües de Busot, in Alicante. A woman was killed after being hit by debris.

A Portuguese captain died after being rescued in the northwestern port city of A Coruña, Galicia. A man died after falling from a roof due to the heavy wind.

=== France ===
A man was killed by a falling tree while driving near Mont-de-Marsan. A 78-year-old man died when he was hit by flying debris near his home, and a 73-year-old woman died after power loss stopped her respirator. A woman died in hospital in the Landes département after she had been found in her garden suffering from hypothermia. In the Gironde département a 70-year-old woman died when her breathing machine failed because of the power outage. Two elderly people were killed in Nanteuil-Auriac-de-Bourzac, Dordogne, by carbon monoxide intoxication which also killed two people in Port-Barcarès, Pyrénées-Orientales.

== Location ==
Map showing path of highest winds - red line shows trajectory, marked with local times

The effects of the storm were felt from the Channel Islands south to Barcelona. The most damaging effects of the storm's rain and heavy winds were located in the south-west of France. The storm originated in the Bay of Biscay and tracked south-eastward through southern France during the evening of 24 January towards northern Italy and the Adriatic, where minimal damage was caused.

== See also ==
- Civil defense
- Cyclones Lothar and Martin
