= Brunulphe III of the Ardennes =

Merovingian noble

Brunulphe III, Count of the Ardennes
- Count of the Ardennes
- Predecessor: Brunulphe II, Count of the Ardennes
- Successor: Alberic the Orphan
- Born: Brunulphe III of the Adrennes c. 595 AD; Ardennes, Kingdom of Austrasia, Francia
- Died: 630 AD; Blaton, County of Hainaut, Kingdom of Austrasia, Francia
- Father: Brunulphe II
- Mother: Clotilde de Neustrie

Brunulphe III or Brunulphe III of the Ardennes (French: Brunulphe III d'Ardennes) (died c. 630 AD), was a Frankish nobleman and Merovingian Count of the Ardennes. He was assassinated by King Dagobert I in the Middle Ages.

== Biography ==
Brunulphe III was born in c. 595 AD in Ardennes, Kingdom of Austrasia, Francia.

His great-grandfather was Waubert II, the grandson of Frankish King Clodion who received part of his father Waubert I's inheritance and was designated Count of the Ardennes around 520 AD. Waubert II's son and Brunulphe III's grandfather, Brunulphe I, Count of Cambrésis and of the Ardennes willingly stayed in his father's Palace of Haucourt-en-Cambrésis. In 595 AD, Brunulphe III was born to Clotilde de Neustrie (sister of Saint Aye) as the first son of Brunulphe II. Brunulphe III's sisters were Queen Sichilde (b. 590 AD), allied to King Chlothar II and Queen Gomentrude (b. 598 AD), wife of King Dagobert I. As a result of his sister's marriage, Brunulphe III became King Dagobert's brother-in-law.

Brunulphe III's father, Count Brunulphe II of the Ardennes died in 618 AD.

Before King Chlothar II died, he entrusted his sons to the Frankish dukes, naming Dagobert I king of the Franks and Charibert II king of the Austrasians. Dukes Brunulfe and Gundeland were appointed as Charibert's guardians, while Dukes Arnulf and Pepin were assigned to Dagobert. After Chlothar's death around c. 628 AD, Dagobert disregarded these orders, leading Brunulfe and Gundeland to raise armies, which failed. Dagobert had Gundeland forced into exile, his brother-in-law Brunulphe III assassinated, and their sons expelled from Austrasia and Neustria. King Dagobert confiscated Brunulphe's property and stripped his children in 636 AD in the city of Blaton. Brunulphe left four sons: Brunulphe the Younger, Albéric the Orphan, Hydulphe, and Glomeric.

His duchy was later restored by the Austrasian King Sigebert III and divided between his four sons with Brunulphe the younger becoming Count of Louvain, and his second son Alberic, who became Count of Hainaut. His son Hydulphe (Hidulphe) became the Count of the Adrennes, whose only daughter and heiress Béatrice married Martin, Duke of Mosellane, which united the Ardennes with the Duchy of Mosellane. His other son Glomeric was the Count of Durbuy and Namur.

== Death ==
Brunulphe III died at the castle of Blaton, in the County of Hainaut, Kingdom of Austrasia, in c. 630 AD after being executed by order of his brother-in-law King Dagobert I.

== Family ==
- Waubert II (great-great-grandfather)
- Amalberge of Landen (great-great-grandmother)
- Waubert III (great-grandfather)
- Brunulphe I (grandfather)
- Brunulphe II, Count of the Ardennes (father)
- Clotilde de Neustrie (mother)
- Saint Aye (aunt)
- Sichilde (sister)
- Gomentrude (sister)
- Chlothar II (brother-in-law)
- Dagobert I (brother-in-law)
- Brunulphe IV the Younger (son)
- Alberic the Orphan (son)
- Hydulphe (son)
- Glomeric (son)
