= Brunulphe II of the Ardennes =

Merovingian noble

Brunulphe II the Younger, Count of the Ardennes
- Count of the Ardennes
- Predecessor: Brunulphe I, Count of the Adrennes
- Successor: Brunulphe III, Count of the Ardennes
- Born: Brunulphe II the Younger c. 560 AD; Colonia Agrippina, Kingdom of Austrasia, Francia
- Died: 618 AD; Ardennes, Kingdom of Austrasia, Francia
- Spouse: Clotilde de Neustrie
- Father: Brunulphe I

Brunulphe II or Brunulphe II of the Ardennes (French: Brunulphe II d'Ardennes) (died c. 618 AD) also called the Younger, was a Frankish nobleman and Merovingian Count of the Ardennes.

== Biography ==
Brunulphe II was born in c. 560 AD in Colonia Agrippina (now Cologne) in the Kingdom of Austrasia.

Brunulphe II's lineage includes his grandfather, Waubert II, grandson of Clodion, King of the Franks, who was named Count of the Ardennes around 520 AD. His father, Brunulphe I, Count of Cambrésis and the Ardennes, inherited the titles and Palace of Haucourt-en-Cambrésis. His sister was Fredegund, wife of the King of Soissons Chilperic I, who gave birth to his nephew Chlothar II, the third King of the Franks.

Brunulphe II welcomed his first son, Brunulphe III, born to Clotilde de Neustrie (sister of Saint Aye) in 595 AD. Brunulphe II had two daughters: Sichilde, Queen consort of the Franks and wife of King Chlothar II, and Gomentrude, Queen consort of Neustria and Burgundy and wife of King Dagobert I.

In the 630s, King Dagobert put his son Brunulphe III to death and stripped his grandchildren of their property in Blaton.

== Death ==
Count Brunulphe II of the Ardennes died in c. 618 AD in Ardennes, Kingdom of Austrasia, Francia.

== Family ==
- Waubert I (great-grandfather)
- Lucile de Pannonie (great-grandmother)
- Waubert II (grandfather)
- Amalberge von Thüringen (grandmother)
- Brunulphe I (father)
- Clotilde de Neustrie (wife)
- Saint Aye (sister-in-law)
- Sichilde (daughter)
- Chlothar II (son-in-law)
- Gomentrude (daughter)
- Dagobert I (son-in-law)
- Brunulphe III, Count of the Ardennes (son)
- Brunulphe IV the Younger (grandson)
- Alberic the Orphan (grandson)
- Hydulphe (grandson)
- Glomeric (grandson)
