= Brunulphe I of the Ardennes =

Merovingian noble

Brunulphe, Count of the Ardennes
- Count of the Ardennes
- Born: Brunulphe of the Ardennes c. 522 AD; Kingdom of Austrasia, Francia
- Died: Unknown; Kingdom of Austrasia, Francia
- Father: Walbert III

Brunulphe or Brunulphe of the Ardennes (French: Brunulphe d'Ardennes) (born c. 522 AD) was a Frankish nobleman and Merovingian Count of the Ardennes.

== Biography ==
Brunulphe was born around c. 522 AD in the Kingdom of Austrasia, Francia.

Brunulphe's father, Walbert III was a direct descendant of Clodion, King of the Franks. Brunulphe's older brother was Saint Walbert IV and his nieces were Saint Waltrude and Saint Aldegund. Brunulphe's sisters were Vraye and St. Amalberge, who married Witger, Count of Condat.

Brunulphe married Vraye, daughter of the Duke of Burgundy with whom he had two daughters: Saint Aye and Clotilde. Clotilde was the wife of Sigilfe (Sigilfus or Brunulphe). The brother of his father had various children, among them St. Hydulphe of Lobbes, who later married Saint Aye.

== Death ==
Count Brunulphe of the Ardennes died in Austrasia, Francia.

== Family ==
- Walbert I (great-grandfather)
- Lucille of Pannonia (great-grandmother)
- Walbert II (grandfather)
- Walbert III (father)
- Walbert IV (brother)
- Clotilde d'Neustrie (daughter)
- Saint Aye (daughter)
- Saint Hydulphe (son-in-law/cousin)
