= Alberic, Count of Hainaut =

Merovingian noble

Albéric the Orphan, Count of Hainaut
- Count of Hainaut
- Predecessor: Vincent Madelgarius
- Successor: Walter (Waultier) I of the Ardennes
- Born: Albéric d'Ardenne c. 630 AD; Ardennes, Kingdom of Austrasia, Francia
- Died: 694 AD; Mons, pagus Hainoensis, Austrasia, Francia
- Spouse: Sybille of Alsace

Alberic of the Ardennes, Alberick, or Albéric l'Orphelin de Hainaut d'Ardenne (died c. 694 AD), also called the Orphan, was a Frankish nobleman and Merovingian Count of Hainaut (French: Comte de Hainaut).

== Biography ==
=== Early life ===
Alberic was born in the pagus Arduensis in c. 630 AD in the Kingdom of Austrasia, in Francia. He was the second son of Count Brunulphe and Clotilde de Neustrie, sister of Belgian Catholic saint Saint Aye.

=== Father's death ===
Near death, King Chlothar II, king of the Franks and the Austrasians, appointed his sons Dagobert I as king of the Franks and Charibert II as king of Austrasia, with Dukes Brunulfe, Gundeland, Arnulf, and Pepin entrusted as their guardians. Dagobert ignored this after Chlothar's death. Brunulfe and Gundeland raised armies but failed, leading to Gundeland's exile and Brunulfe's execution at the castle of Blaton. Dagobert seized Austrasia and expelled their sons from the domains of the kingdoms.

=== The Orphan ===
In 636 AD, King Dagobert confiscated Brunulphe's property in Blaton, leaving his son, Alberic the Orphan, along with his brothers, Brunulphe the Younger, Hydulphe, and Glomeric, stripped of their inheritance. Following his father's execution at the castle of Blaton and his mother's exile during the reign of King Dagobert I, Alberic was left orphaned at a young age. He received the nickname Alberic the Orphan (French: Albéric l'Orphelin).

=== Count of Hainaut ===
Sigebert III ascended the Austrasian throne in the mid-7th century, later resolving the region's issues created by his father King Dagobert's policies. He restored church properties and returned lands, duchies, and counties previously seized from nobles to their rightful heirs. In 651, Alberic was granted the restitution of various property confiscated from his father when he was put to death by order of Dagobert, King of Neustria. Sigebert, King of Austrasia, restored the four sons of Duke Brunulfe to their possessions and divided their father's duchy among them, assigning to each a lot proportionate to his age and honorable court duties. The eldest son Brunulphe had the territory of Louvain, the country of the Ardennes fell to Hydulphe, and the county of Durbuy and of Namur to Glomeric. The pagus of Hainoensis (and city of Cambrai) was granted to the young Alberic, ceded by the Count of Hainaut Vincent Madelgarius, husband of Saint Waltrude. Waltrude's father, Walbert IV, had inherited it from Walbert III but left no male heir. Following the death of Saint Walbert IV, the eldest branch of Walbert III's generation came to an end. After the passing of Saint Waltrude's son Dentelin, the family's estate was transferred to their cousin, Saint Aye, wife of Saint Hydulphe. Having no children, Saint Aye bequeathed her inheritance to Alberic the Orphan, her nephew through her sister, Clotilde, married to Brunulphe. Alberic thus became the rightful heir to the title and properties of Hainaut as the closest male relative per the Salic Law. The Austrasian king also orchestrated grand marriages, such as Alberic's with Sybille d'Alsace, daughter of the Duke of Alsace.

=== Beginning of Mons ===
With Alberic's approval, part of the inheritance he lost after his father's death was redirected by King Sigebert to fund a major contribution to an abbey in the royal forest of the Ardennes. Unable to bear the proximity of Condé (former principality of Hainaut) to Blaton, Alberic withdrew to Castriloc (Châteaulieu Castri) where Saint Waltrude had just founded a monastery and King Sigebert was building the church of Sainte Marie, consecrating his two sisters. Near the hermitage of Saint Waltrude, the church of Sainte Marie and a crypt was built around 653 AD. On the hill of present-day Mons in the pagus of Hainoensis, an old tower stood near the church of Sainte Marie. It was believed to be the former site of the Roman fortress known as Castrum Caesaris, built by Julius Caesar during his conquest of Roman Gaul. The fortress was defended against several Gallic tribes and later destroyed by barbarians in the 5th century. In the 7th century, Alberic repaired the remains of the site, surrounded it with walls, and thus formed a castle capable of resisting the enemy. The region subsequently increased in size and prosperity, and around it grew the present-day city of Mons, Belgium, which Charlemagne made the capital of Hainaut in 804 AD.

=== Succession ===
Alberic passed on to his children the Duchy of Alsace (in southwest Austrasia) and the County of Hainaut. The succession was shared between his two sons, Hugues who was Count of Cambrésis and Walter (Wautier I), his eldest son, who succeeded him as the Count of Hainaut. Walter was known as "the Orphan," following his father's legacy. After Charles Martel died, Count Walter the Orphan ruled Hainaut while Pepin was mayor of the palace.

== Death ==
Alberic of the Ardennes died in Mons, in the pagus Hainoensis, Austrasia, Francia (now Hainaut Province, Belgium) in 694 AD. He was buried in the Church of Saint Pierre de Mons (French: Église de Saint-Pierre-de-Mons).
