= Walbert II =

Merovingian noble (c.513–519 AD)

Walbert II the Younger
- Count of the Ardennes; Count of Hainaut
- Predecessor: Walbert I
- Successor: Walbert III
- Born: Walbert II c. 513-519; Francia
- Died: c. 575; Austrasia, Francia
- Spouse: Clotilde
- Father: Walbert I
- Mother: Lucille of Pannonia

Walbert II (born c. 513-519 AD) also called the Younger, was a patrician, Roman senator, and Merovingian Count of Haynau and of the Ardennes.

== Biography ==
Walbert II "the Younger" was born in Francia during the Middle Ages.

He was a direct descendant of Auberon (or Albéron), Lord of the Ardennes, son of Clodebald de Francie and grandson of Clodion the Hairy. His grandmother, Argotte, daughter of Theodoric the Great, was from the Ostrogoths. His father, Walbert I, was the only one of Clodion the Hairy's lineage not killed by Clovis I. Sent to Rome as a child, his father married Lucille of Pannonia, sister (or daughter) of Emperor Zeno. He and his brother Ansbert both became patricians and were appointed as Gallo-Roman senators.

He came into possession of the lordships that his father had in the pagi of the Arduensis and of Hainoensis (now Hainaut Province). His brother Ansbert the Senator, first acquired the marquisate of the Holy Empire on the Escaut and later the Duchy of Mosel, a region spanning from Metz to Cologne and Luxembourg.

Walbert II married Clotilde (originally d'Ostrogothie), daughter of Athalaric, King of the Visigoths. Among their children were Walbert III, Vraye, and Brunulf I, Count of Cambrésis, father to Brunulf II. His daughter Vraye, married Mummolin (or Mummolinus), patrician and descendant of the Dukes of Tongeren, who became chief general under King Sigebert.

=== Succession ===
His son, Brunulf I, inherited the title of Count of Cambrésis in addition to the Palace of Haucourt-en-Cambrésis. The eldest of his sons, Walbert III, had as his wife Amalberge of Landen, daughter of Carloman by whom he had four children including two sons: Walbert IV and another Brunulphe I, Count of the Adrennes. Walbert II's grandson Walbert IV married Saint Bertille, daughter of the King of Thuringia by whom he had two daughters: Saint Waltrude, Princess of Ardennes and Countess of Hainaut, who was married to Madelgaire, and Saint Aldegonde, first abbess of Maubeuge. His son Brunulf was the father of Saint Hydulphe, who inherited the Principality of Ardennes from his cousin, Waltrude, and Hainaut from his wife, Saint Aye, but died without children.

== Death ==
Count Walbert II of the Ardennes died around c. 575 in Austrasia, Francia.
