= Walbert III =

Merovingian noble (c.560–608 AD)

- Predecessor: Walbert II
- Successor: Walbert IV
- Born: Walbert III c. 560; Francia
- Died: c. 608; Kingdom of Austrasia, Francia
- Father: Walbert II
- Mother: Clothilde

Walbert III (born c. 560 AD) was a Frankish nobleman and a Merovingian Count.

== Biography ==
Walbert III was born in c. 560 in Francia. He was the son of Walbert II.

Walbert III's lineage traces to his great-grandfather, Albéron (Auberon or Alberic), son of Clodebald de Francie and grandson of Clodion the Hairy, King of the Franks. Walbert III descended from Walbert I who was the only survivor of his lineage after Clovis I hunted down the children of Clodio. Walbert I sought refuge with Emperor Zeno in Rome, marrying his daughter (or sister), Lucile of Pannonia. Walbert III's father, Walbert II the Younger, and his uncle, Ansbert, became patricians and Gallo-Roman senators.

Walbert III, born to Walbert II and Clotilde (Rothilde), sister of King of the Visigoths Athalaric, was the brother of Vraye (wife of Mummolin, a general of King Sigebert III's Austrasian army) and Brunulf, Count of Cambrésis. He was the eldest of Walbert II's sons. Walbert II came into possession of the lordships that his father had in the various pagi including the Ardennes and Hainoensis (now Hainaut Province). His brother Brunulf inherited the pagus of Cambrésis in addition to the Palace of Haucourt-en-Cambrésis and had a son named Brunulf II.

His wife Amalberge was the daughter of Carloman of Landen, sister of Pepin of Landen, and aunt of Saint Gertrude. They had four children: Walbert IV (father of Saint Waltrude), Brunulphe, Count of the Adrennes (father of Saint Aye), Amalberga of Maubeuge, and Vraye. His daughter St. Amalberga married Witger, Count of Condat and father of St. Aubert, bishop of Cambrai.

He put his son Walbert IV, the grandson of Charles de Hasbaye, at the royal court of King Clotaire II and later under his son, Dagobert I, during both their reigns in the 7th century.

Walbert III was the grandfather of Saint Waltrude and Saint Aldegund through his son Walbert IV's marriage to Bertille, daughter of the King of Thuringia. Walbert III's son Brunulphe, Count of the Adrennes married Vraye, daughter of the Duke of Burgundy with whom he had two daughters: Saint Aye and Clothilde. Saint Hydulphe, his nephew, later married to his granddaughter Saint Aye.

== Death ==
Count Walbert III died in the early 7th century in Kingdom of Austrasia, Francia.
