= Basilica of Saint-Romain =

Coordinates: 45.1295°N 0.6634°W

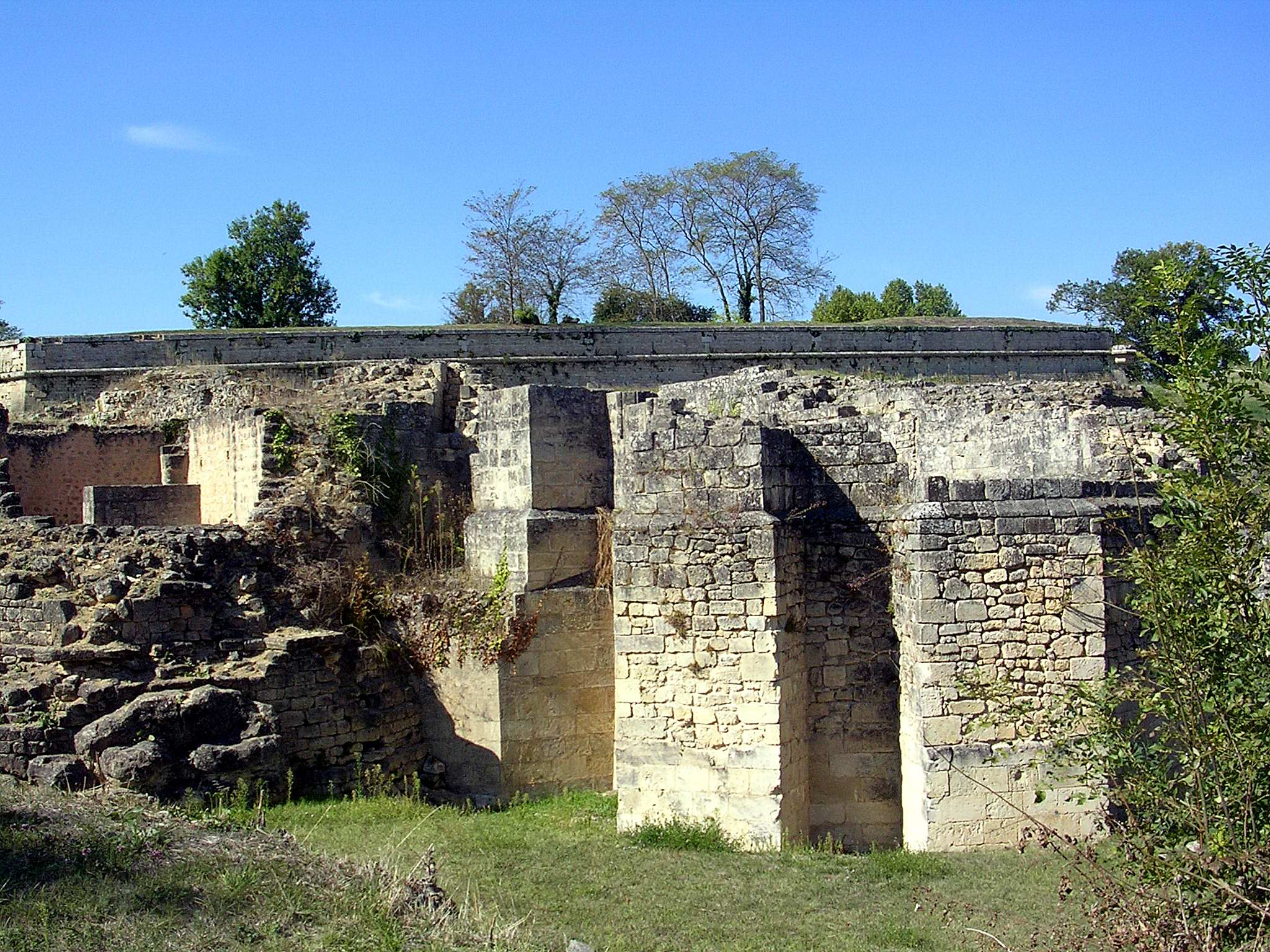
Vestiges of the basilica in the citadel of Blaye

The Basilica of Saint-Romain, Blaye, was an important Merovingian basilica, the resting-place of Charibert II, a son of Clotaire II who was briefly king of Aquitaine from 629 to his death in 632, and of his son. According to the 12th-century Chanson de Roland contained the body and relics of the Carolingian folk-hero Roland, who was a seigneur of Blaye in the eighth century, and of his companions Olivier and Turpin, deposited with grand solemnity in white marble sarcophagi. In Bordeaux across the Gironde the oliphaunt, Roland's split ivory horn, was preserved: li pelerin li veient ki la vunt, "the pilgrim may see it who goes"; a Seint Romain; la gisent li baron, "at Saint-Romain; there lie the barons", a sign interpreted by Gerald Brault to show that the pilgrimage sites at Bordeaux and Blaye had been established before the Chanson de Roland was composed. Indeed, in 1109 Hugh of Fleury concluded his account of the battle of Roncevaux with the words "whence Roland was carried to the citadel of Blaye and buried." The legend was long credited: in 1526 François I commanded the tomb of Roland to be opened.

The nominal patron of the basilica, belonging to the Canons Regular of Saint Augustine, remained the local 4th-century martyr Saint Romanus of Blaye; here the pilgrims bound for Santiago de Compostela paused before taking to boats to cross to Bordeaux.

In 848, the fort and its surrounding habitations were laid waste by the Viking chief Hasting.

Some vestiges of the structure remain within the Vauban fortress at Blaye, which formed part of the traditional defenses of the Gironde estuary.

== Burials ==
- Charibert II
- Chilperic of Aquitaine
