= Victor Martin (sociologist) =

Sociologist involved with the WWII Belgian Resistance

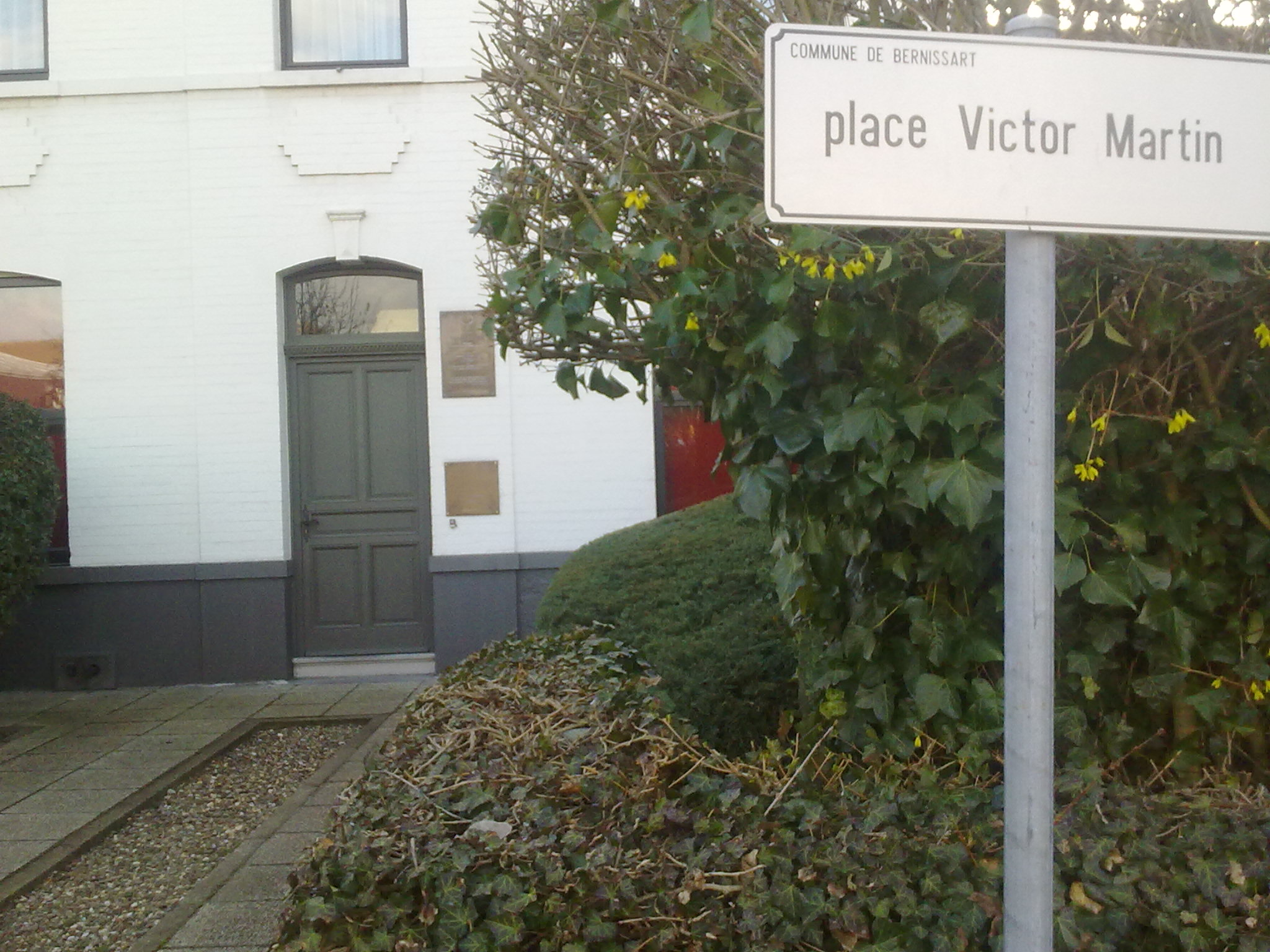
House in which Victor Martin lived in Blaton, Belgium

Victor Martin (Blaton, Belgium 19 January 1912 – Féternes, France, November 1989) was a Belgian sociologist who is known for his involvement with the Belgian Resistance during World War II. Specifically, Martin was involved in collecting information about the Holocaust in Eastern Europe.

Using academic networks established before the war, Martin agreed to undertake a spying mission in Nazi Germany on behalf of the Front de l'Indépendance group to find reliable information on the fate of Belgian Jews deported to Eastern Europe. Martin reported his findings about the mass extermination of Jews and was one of the first to provide detailed information on the functioning of the Auschwitz concentration camp.

== Espionage operation ==
Martin had travelled in Switzerland, France and Germany before the war. His academic title had given him access to a network of contacts in German universities. As a member of the Belgian Resistance, he realized that his mastery of the German language was a valuable skill. He proposed himself for a secret mission in enemy territory

Martin's proposal was accepted, but his mission was not what he had expected. At the request of the officials of the Comité de Défense des Juifs, he went to observe directly where the trains went that carried Belgium's deported Jews. He invented a project researching the psychology of different social classes as cover. He obtained meetings with sociologist Leopold von Wiese at Cologne, and with another colleague at the University of Breslau (now Wrocław in Poland). The project was accepted by the Nazis and he obtained permits to travel between Frankfurt, Berlin and Breslau from 4–20 February 1943.

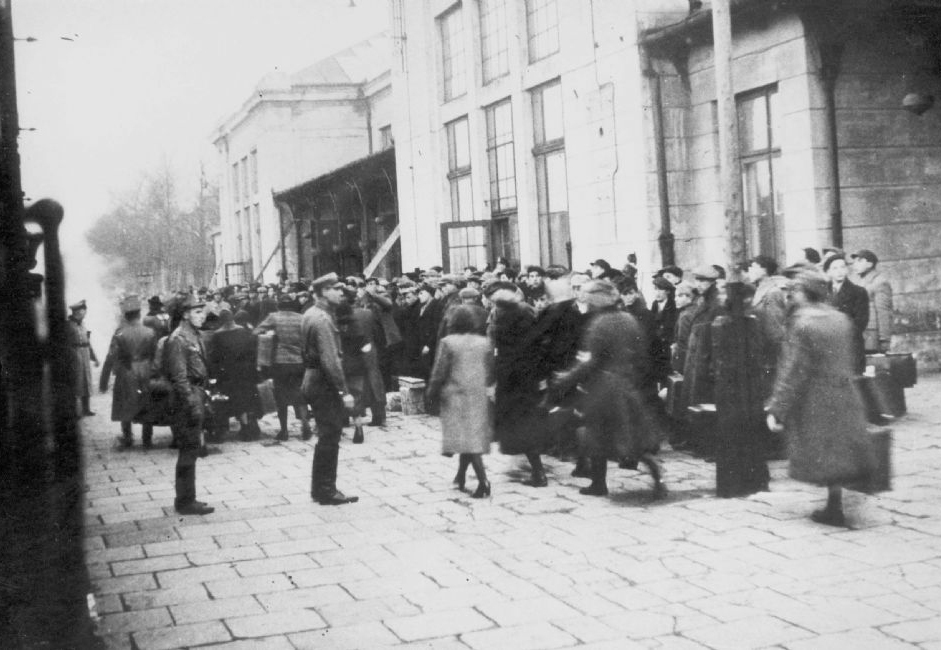
View of the liquidation of the Sosnowiec Ghetto between June and August 1943, shortly after Martin's visit

After his meeting in Breslau, he risked diverging from his route. He travelled to Sosnowiec, where he hoped to talk to Belgian Jews who had been hospitalized in the ghetto. Although the city's ghetto was open, it was strictly forbidden for Jews to leave. He succeeded in entering the ghetto.

Martin does not find any of the people he is supposed to meet. They had either been arrested or escaped the ghetto. Every person he talks to is convinced that the deported Jews had been liquidated. He learns that many Jews had been transported to Auschwitz concentration camp.

At Katowice, not far from Auschwitz, Martin met workers from the Service du Travail Obligatoire in a bistro, who described to him the mass extermination of Jews and the incineration of their bodies. He met with them on several occasions. Betrayed to the Gestapo, he was arrested and imprisoned on 1 April 1943 at the Radwitz camp, where he served as an interpreter. He escaped on 15 May 1943.

After secretly returning to Belgium, he wrote a report (archived by the Yad Vashem Holocaust memorial) to his resistance comrades in the Front de l'Indépendance. They passed the results to London. News of his discoveries also circulated in Belgium, causing Jews to hide their children with the underground and to take flight. Martin went underground in the Charleroi area. He was arrested by the Gestapo, and transferred to Herzogenbusch concentration camp in the Netherlands. He escaped again, and was sheltered by resistance comrades.

After the war, Martin worked for the Belgian employment administration and later overseas for the International Labour Organization. He married and had a family, and retired to Haute-Savoie towards the end of the 1970s. He died in anonymity in 1989 in Féternes, near Thonon-les-Bains (Haute-Savoie, France).

== Honours ==
- A square was renamed in his honour in Blaton in 1999.
- In Antheit, a district of Wanze, Belgium, there is a street named after him.
- In 2008 a memorial plaque was placed on his last residence in Féternes, France. 46.346917°N 6.557111°E

== See also ==
- Jan Karski
- Witold Pilecki
