= Walbert IV =

Count of Hainaut and Frankish saint

Saint Walbert IV
- Born: Walbert IV; Pagus Hainoensis, Austrasia, Francia Francia
- Died: c. 640-646; Cousolre, Pagus Hainoensis, Austrasia, Francia
- Venerated in: Roman Catholic Church
- Feast: 11 May

Saint Walbert IV (French: Sainte Walbert IV) (died c. 640-646 AD), also known as Vaubert, Waubert, or Waudbert was a Merovingian Count of Hainaut and a Frankish saint. He was the father of Saint Waltrude (wife of Madelgaire), and Saint Aldegund, first abbess of Maubeuge.

== Biography ==
Walbert IV was born in the pagus Hainoensis, Austrasia, Francia (now Hainaut Province, Belgium).

St. Walbert of Hainaut came from a direct line of descent from Auberon, son of Clodio, King of the Franks. His great-grandfather was Walbert I.

His parents were Walbert III and Amalberge of Landen, daughter of Carloman. Saint Walbert's uncle on his mother's side was Pepin of Landen. He was a relative of Saint Gertrude. Walbert IV's grandfather, Charles de Hasbaye V, fathered Veraye, who married Aymon, Count of Ardennes, and became the mother of the four sons of Aymon.

He was one of four children: Walbert IV, Brunulphe I, Count of the Adrennes, St. Amalberga, and Vraye. Walbert IV, married to Princess Bertille of Thuringia, daughter of the King of Thuringia, had two daughters: Saint Waltrude, Princess of Ardennes and Countess of Hainaut, wife of Madelgaire, and Saint Aldegund, first abbess of Maubeuge. His brother Brunulphe I, Count of the Adrennes's wife was Vraye, daughter of the Duke of Burgundy with whom he had two daughters: Saint Aye (heiress of the County of Hainaut after Saint Waltrude) and Clotilde (wife of Sigilfe or Sigilfus). Walbert IV's uncle, Brunulphe, counted Saint Hydulphe, later married to Saint Aye, among his children.

Walbert IV served first in the royal court of King Clotaire II and later under his son, Dagobert I, during both their reigns. During his youth, he resided in the royal court of Clotaire II as a domesticus (and later regent), then withdrew to his lands and settled in the castle of Cousolre, constructed by his ancestors. Coursolre Castle was part farm, part palace. Waltrude and Aldetrude, his daughters, were born at that location. His father had become a monk, leaving behind his estates. He became a lord of Lower Austrasia, whose duchy covered Cambrésis, Hainaut, Brabant, Hesbaye, Ardennes, and extended to the Rhine.

In Cousolre, Walbert and Bertille built a church and a monastery dedicated to Notre-Dame, erected in the 7th century.

== Death ==
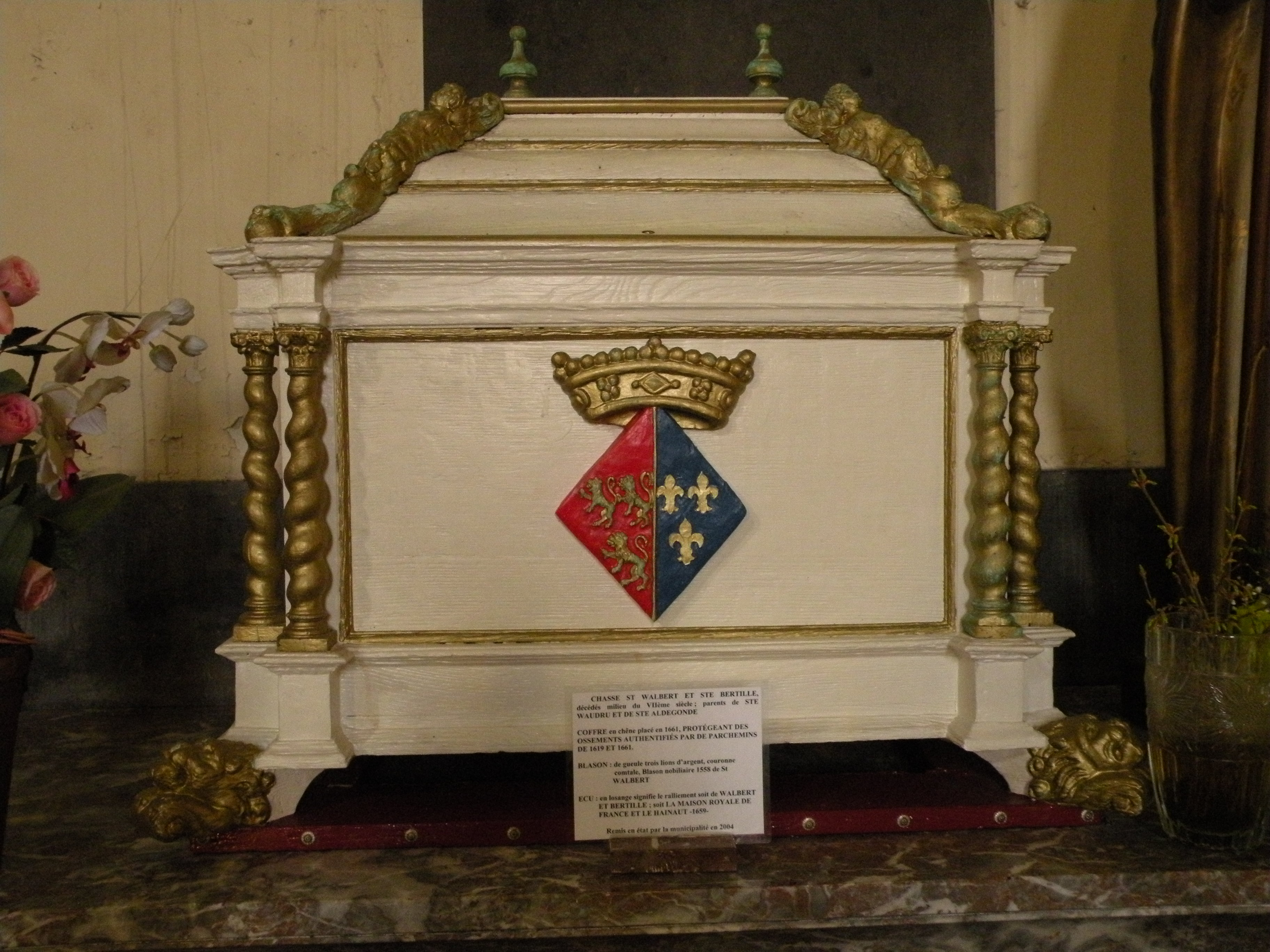
Oak chest placed at Église Saint-Martin de Cousolre in 1661 protecting the bones of St. Walbert and Ste. Bertille.

Saint Walbert IV died around c. 640-646 AD in Cousolre, pagus Hainoensis, Austrasia, Francia (now Belgium).

After Walbert's death, his son-in-law Vincent Madelgarius governed as Count of Hainaut alongside his daughter Saint Waltrude, Countess of Hainaut. Saint Bertille died a few years later and was buried alongside her husband in Cousolre, where their daughter was later interred. After Walbert and Bertille were canonized, Cousolre became a renowned pilgrimage site, attracting even Charlemagne. Hubert of Liège, during the Carolingian Dynasty, raised Saint Walbert and Saint Bertille, before elevating their daughter, Saint Waltrude, in Charlemagne's presence. Waltrude's remains were transferred to modern-day Mons. In 1552, a stone with the inscription: "Hubertus Tongrensis Epifcopus poftquam elevasset S Walbertum & S Bertilliam elevavit S Waldetrudem presente Carolo Magno Imperatore" was discovered in a wall of the Old Church of Cousolre. The bones of Walbert IV and Saint Bertille were preserved and placed at the Church of Saint-Martin in Cousolre in 1661.
