= Chilperic of Aquitaine =

King of Aquitaine in 632

King of Aquitaine
- Reign: 632
- Predecessor: Charibert II
- Successor: Dagobert I
- Born: 626
- Died: c. 632 (aged 6 or 7); Vitry-en-Artois
- Burial: Basilica of Saint-Romain
- Dynasty: Merovingian
- Father: Charibert II
- Mother: Fulberte (possibly fictitious)

Chilperic sometimes enumerated as Chilperic II (sometimes Childeric in the chronicles of the time) was the infant son of Charibert II, and briefly king of Aquitaine in 632. He was killed shortly after his father’s death in 632, under orders by Dagobert I, Charibert's half-brother.

Chilperic of Aquitaine Merovingian Dynasty Born: 630s Died: 632
Preceded by Charibert II	King of Aquitaine; 632	Succeeded by Bodegisel, as Duke
