= Chateau de Reuilly =

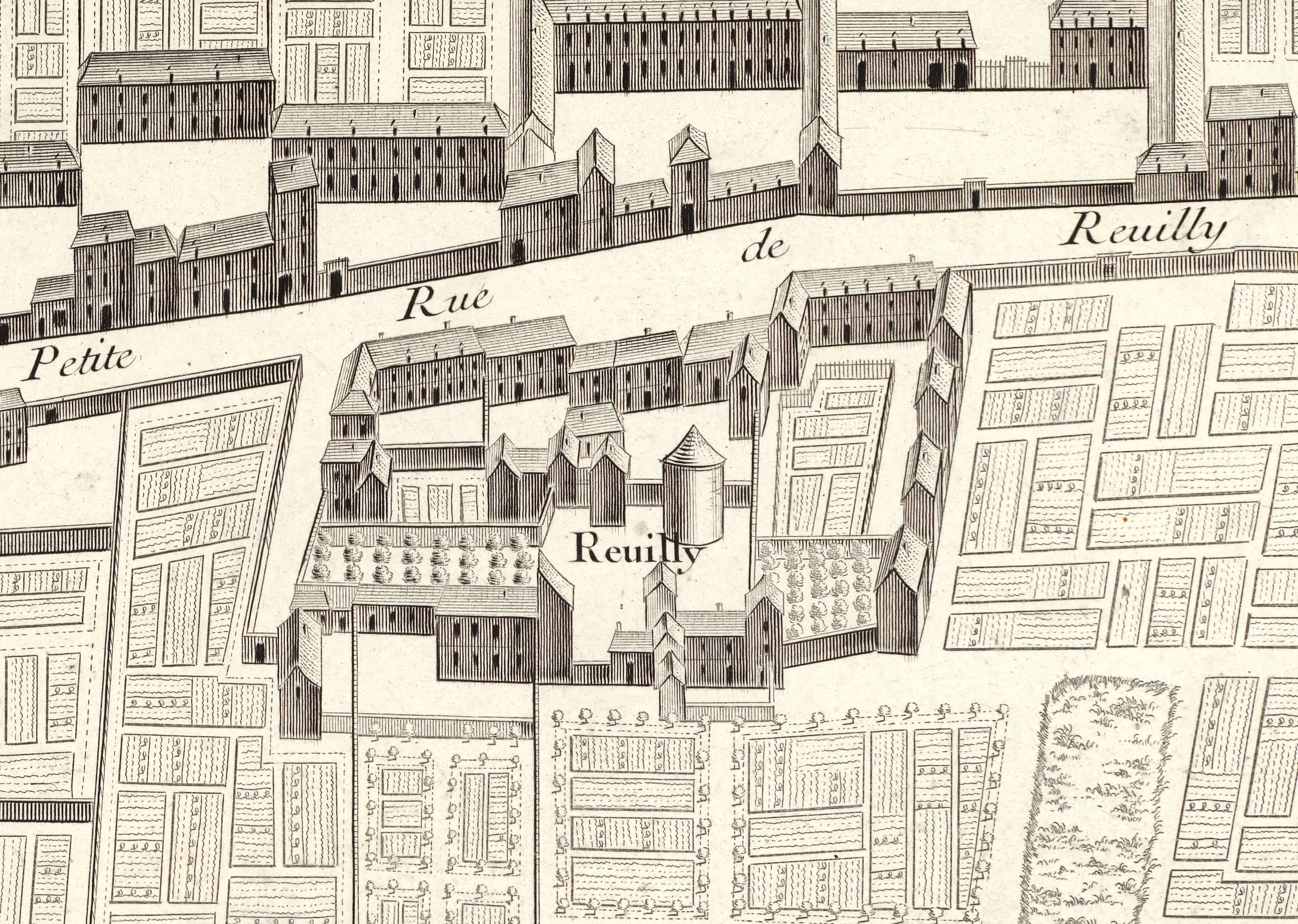
Drawing of the Chateau de Reuilly. Detail from the Turgot map of Paris. 1739

The Château de Reuilly was a Merovingian royal residence. Now destroyed, it was located in the village of Reuilly, in the current 12th arrondissement of Paris near the metro station, Reuilly-Diderot.

== Description of the Residence ==
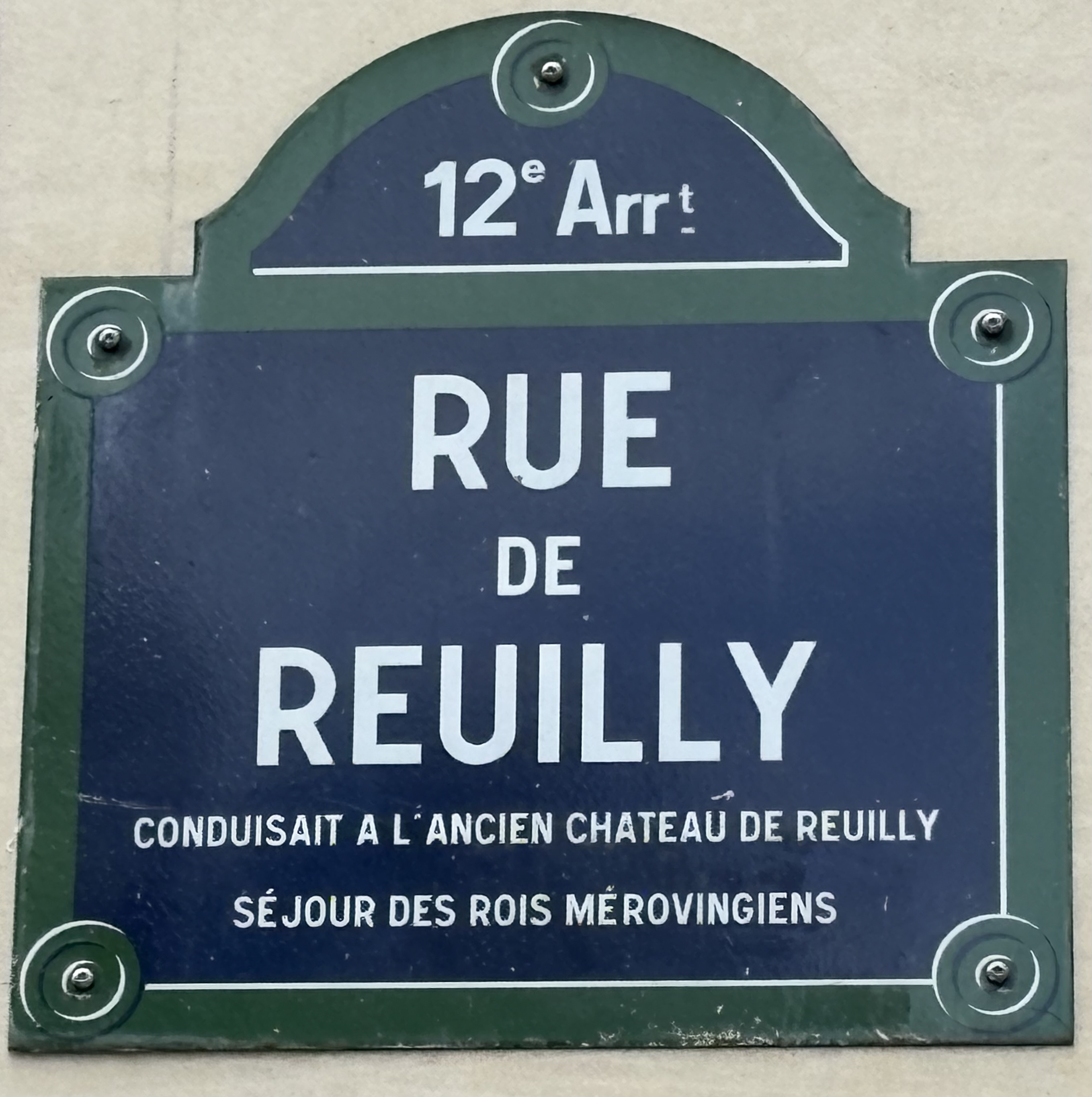
Street sign in Paris, 12th arrondissement. The sign notes that the rue de Reuilly once led to the Chateau de Reuilly.

The Château de Reuilly was one of the royal residences of Dagobert I in the early and mid-7th century. Because early medieval archives have not been preserved, little is known about this residence. A historical account describes it as follows^{:11}:

Little is known about this villa situated in Reuilly, the word villa being used in the sense that it had in Roman times. It was both a farm with its barns, silos, dovecotes and cellars and a luxurious dwelling with immense rooms decorated with frescoes, painted canvases and covered with carpets. As the construction was made of wood, nothing remains of it.

== History ==
According to Jean de La Tynna, it was in the ancient Chateau of Reuilly (Romiliacum) that Dagobert I, in 629, repudiated his wife Gomatrude for not having given him children.^{:11} A document dated 637 associates the same Dagobert (629–639) with the name of Reuilly (Ruilliacum), but it seems to refer rather to Reuilly in the French department of Indre, because this manuscript associates Reuilly with other places in the region of Berry. The authenticity of this document has also been questioned for reasons of style and date, but Reuilly (in Indre) was indeed attached to the Abbey of Saint-Denis at the end of the 10th century.

Perhaps finding his Parisian abode too austere, Dagobert acquired three other residences, including two in locations that are now known as Clichy and Garches and another, acquired shortly before his death in 639, in Épinay-sur-Seine.^{:12}

After serving as a residence for the Merovingian kings for a long time, the palace was abandoned by their successors. It became the property of the Knights Templar in the 13th century, then of the Hospitallers of the Order of Saint John of Jerusalem, before once again becoming the property of the King of France.

It was still the property of the King of France in 1359, because at that time King John promised to grant Humbert, Patriarch of Alexandria, ownership of the property.
