= Romanus of Blaye =

Saint Romanus of Blaye was a priest in the Gironde in France.

He was active at the end of the fourth century. Gregory of Tours claimed that St. Martin of Tours buried Romanus. An old life of St. Romanus was published in the Analecta Bollandiana. His feast is 24 November.
