= Gomentrude =

Merovingian queen of the Franks

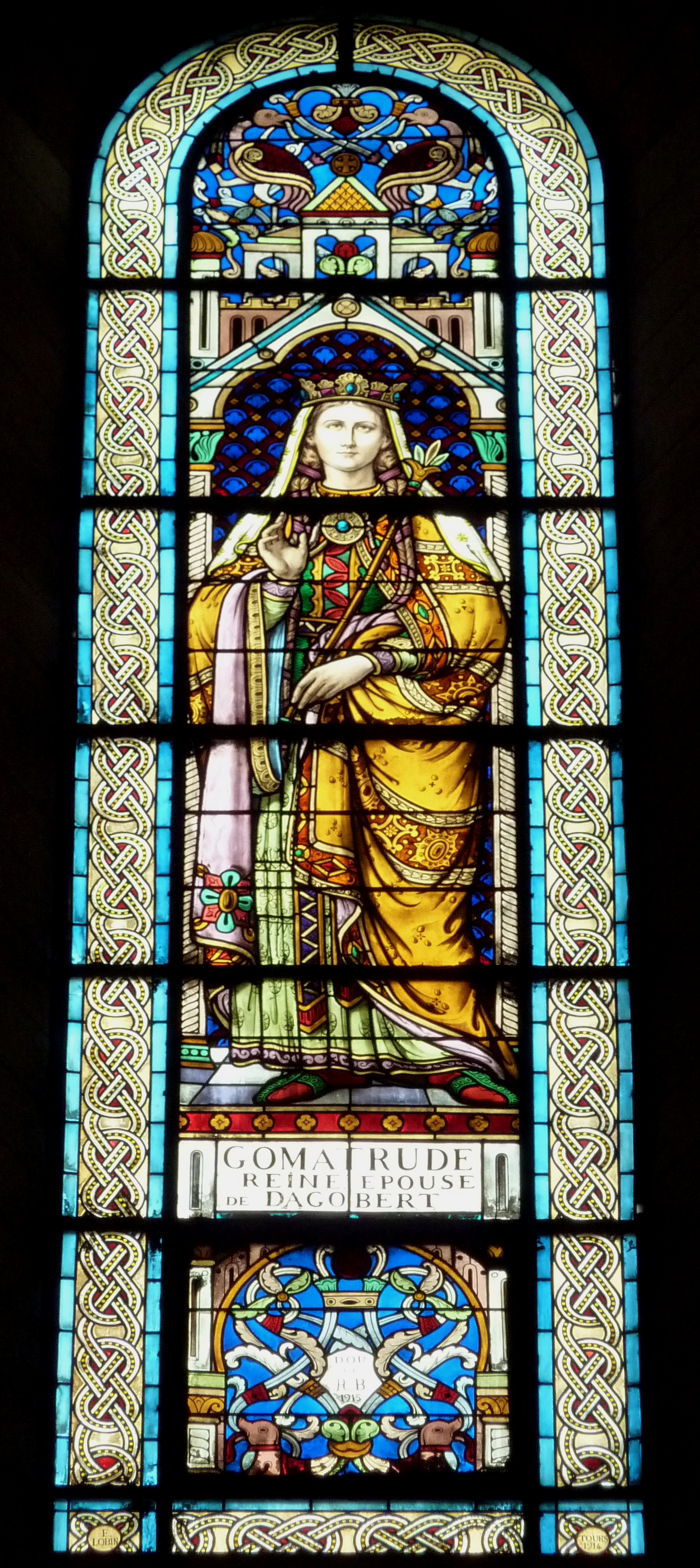

Queen consort of Neustria and Burgundy
- Tenure: 628 – 629
- Born: c. 598
- Died: 630
- Spouse: Dagobert I

Gomentrude (c. 598 – fl. 630), also Gomatrude, Gométrude, or Gomatrudis, was a Frankish queen consort by marriage to king Dagobert I. It is possible that Gomentrude was descended from Ragnacaire (fl. 486), king of the Franks in Cambrai, through his son Magnachaire (fl. 555), Duke of the Franks.

== Life and queenship ==
She was the younger sister of queen Sichilde, third wife of King Clotaire II. Their brother was likely lord Brodulf (assuming Sichilde is the mother of Charibert II), who tried to defend the rights of his nephew on the kingdom of Aquitaine against the ambitions of Dagobert I.

The marriage was arranged against the will of Dagobert in 625. When he became king in 629, he repudiated her one year after his succession, officially because of her claimed infertility.

In 625, Clotaire married her to his own son, Dagobert, who was already king of Austrasia . The ceremony took place in Clichy, (Note: According to a passage from Frédégaire: "Dagobert came by order of his father with his Leudes, in a royal apparatus, to Clichy near Paris, and received in marriage the sister of Queen Sichilde named Gomatrude.") at the palace of Reuilly (Romiliacum), or at the royal villa of Clippiacum located in the current commune of Saint-Ouen (Seine-Saint-Denis). Three days later, a violent feud arose between father and son, with the son claiming all of Austrasia. An arbitration of twelve Frankish lords ended up settling the issue in Dagobert's favor. In 629, on the death of Clotaire, Dagobert became the sole king of the Franks. He then repudiated Gomentrude at the palace of Reuilly to marry Nanthild, (Note: According to a passage from Frédégaire: "Having then gone to Auxerre via Autun, he [Dagobert] came to Paris via the town of Sens, and, leaving Queen Gomatrude at Reuilly, where he had married her, he married a young girl, named Nantéchilde, and made her queen.") under a pretext of her infertility. It is unknown what became of Gomentrude after this, although she may have gone to live with her sister-in-law Bruère.

== See also ==
- Chateau de Reuilly
