= Sichilde =

Queen consort of the Franks
- Tenure: 618–627
- Born: c. 590
- Died: 627
- Spouse: Chlothar II
- Issue: Charibert II
- Father: Count Brunulphe II of the Ardennes

Sichilde (c. 590–627) was a Frankish queen as consort to Chlothar II from 618–627.

She was the daughter of the Count Brunulphe II of the Ardennes and the sister of Gomentrude (598–630), who was married to Dagobert I. Her maternal grandfather was royal maior domus. She married Chlothar in about 618. Subsequently, commentators such as Fredegar complained that Chlothar listened too much to counsel from women, most likely referring to Sichilde, indicating that she held a position of influence.

In 626 or 627, she was suspected of having had a relationship with Boso, son of Audolène of Étampes, and Boso was killed by the duke Arnebert on the order of Chlothar.
