= Walbert I =

Merovingian noble (c.528–535 AD)

Walbert I, Count of the Ardennes
- Count of the Ardennes; Count of Hainaut
- Predecessor: Auberon
- Successor: Walbert II
- Born: Walbert I Roman Gaul
- Died: c. 528–538; Kingdom of Austrasia, Francia
- Spouse: Lucille of Pannonia
- Father: Albéron
- Mother: Argotte of the Ostrogoths

Walbert I, Vaubert, Waudbert, or Vautier (died c. 528–535 AD) also known as Walbert of the Ardennes (French: Walbert I d'Ardennes) was a Frankish nobleman and a Merovingian Count of Hainaut.

== Biography ==
Walbert I was born in Roman Gaul during the 5th century. He was baptized around c. 500 AD by Saint Remigius.

The son of Auberon (also referred to as Albéron, Aldaric, or Alberic) and Argotte of the Ostrogoths, daughter of Theodoric the Great, King of the Ostrogoths, Walbert was one of five sons born to the lord of the Ardennes. Walbert I was the grandson of Clodion, King of the Franks. He was the sole survivor of Clodion the Hairy's lineage, spared by Clovis I while the rest were killed after Clovis was deprived of the throne by Merovech. Walbert was sent to Rome as a child.

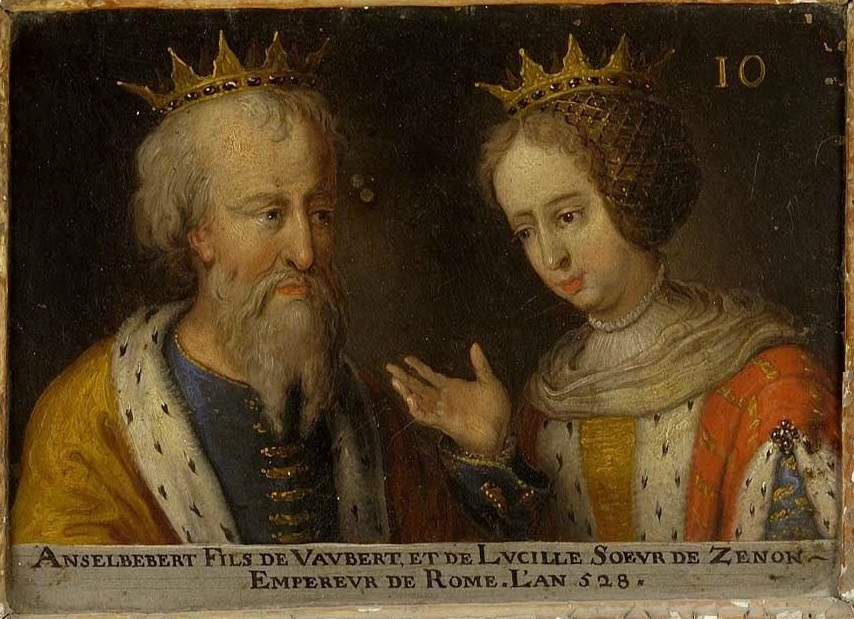
Walbert's son, Anselbert the Senator, and his wife Blitilde. In the year 528 AD.

After seeking refuge with fifth-century East Roman Emperor Zeno, Walbert I married his sister Lucille of Pannonia. With Lucille, he fathered two sons, Walbert II and Ansbert (or Anselbert), both of whom became patricians with the latter appointed as a Gallo-Roman senator. He was the father of another son, Ydulf, whom he had with Clothilde (or Rothilde) of Hainaut and the Adrennes, daughter of Athalaric, the King of Ostrogothic Italy.

The eldest son of Walbert I, Ansbert the Senator, was appointed by Emperor Justinian as the marquisate of the Holy Empire on the Escaut and the duchy of Moselle, covering territory from Metz to Cologne, including Luxembourg. Ansbert supposedly married Princess Blitilde, daughter (or granddaughter) of Clotaire, and fathered Anchise and Arnoald, bishop of Metz.

Count Walbert's alliance with the Thuringii sparked jealousy in King Clotaire, who governed the Kingdom of Soissons and the nearby lands of the pagus Hainoensis (present-day Hainaut). Fearing Walbert's claim to the throne as Clodion's grandson, Clotaire seized his lands. Ultimately, Walbert died in exile due to his perceived treachery, seeking refuge in the Church.

== Death ==
Count Walbert I died in c. 538 in Austrasia, Francia.
