= Blaton =

Section of Bernissart, Wallonia, Belgium

- Sub-municipality of Bernissart
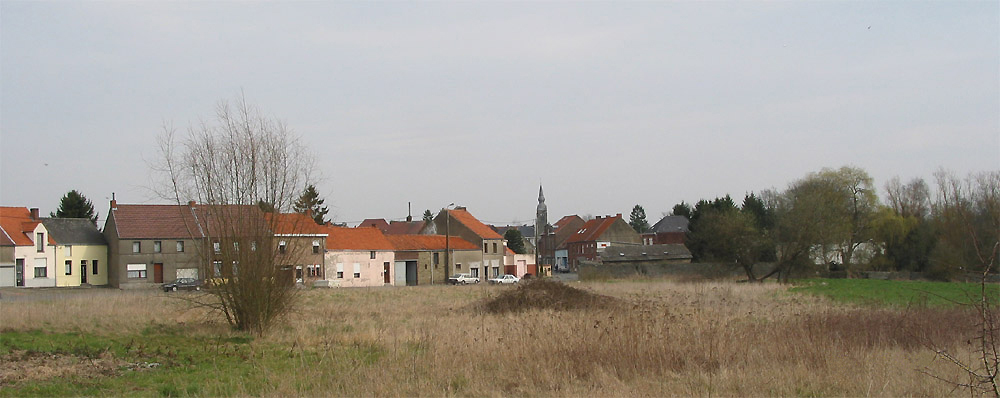
- The village

- Coat of arms

- Location within Belgium Location within Hainaut (Belgium)
- Coordinates: 50°30′N 03°39′E
- Country: Belgium
- Community: French Community
- Region: Wallonia
- Province: Hainaut
- Arrondissement: Ath
- Municipality: Ath

Area
  - Total: 10.49 km^{2} (4.05 sq mi)

Population (2020-01-01)
  - Total: 4,234
  - Density: 404/km^{2} (1,050/sq mi)
- Postal codes: 7321
- Area codes: 069

Blaton (French pronunciation: [blatɔ̃]) is a village of Wallonia and a district of the municipality of Bernissart located in the province of Hainaut, Belgium.

It was formerly a separate municipality until it merged in 1977.

== Etymology ==
The name of Blaton originates from the Latin word "Ablatonis," which transformed into the Gallo-Roman "Ablatonas," meaning at the huts.

== Geography ==
=== Situation ===
The village of Blaton has an altitude ranging from 27 meters at the level of the Nimy-Blaton-Péronnes canal to 67 meters in the Bon-Secours Forest.

This village is served by railway line 78, with Blaton station located in its center, as well as by the E42 highway, being situated 22 km from both the city of Mons and the city of Tournai.

It is also crossed by three canals: Blaton-Ath, Nimy-Blaton-Péronnes, and Pommerœul-Antoing, earning it the nickname "Little Venice of Hainaut".

This strategic location, at the crossroads of major road, rail, and waterway networks, reinforces its importance in the region.

== Culture and Heritage ==
=== Grande Bruyère ===
La Grande Bruyère de Blaton is a former sandpit designated as a SGIB (Site of Great Biological Interest). It is home to a very diverse fauna and flora, supported by its many varied habitats: sandy expanses, bodies of water, thickets, ponds, etc. The Parc Naturel des Plaines de l'Escaut regularly carries out maintenance and management work there since it obtained the status of a state-owned natural reserve in 2003, following an agreement between the municipality of Bernissart and the Walloon Region.

=== Parc Posteau ===
In the center of Blaton, on the edge of the Blaton-Ath Canal, lies Parc Posteau. This approximately 2.5-hectare area includes a pond and the stream that feeds it, with walkways allowing people to cross over the waters.

The park also houses a rural house and an open-air theatrical space, which hosts many festivities throughout the year, including on July 21st, thus contributing to its renown.

The municipality acquired this domain about a century ago. It once belonged to Ulysse Posteau, a grain merchant who lived there. In 2007, a project was launched to create a park and develop the neighboring meadow. The work was completed in 2012, and the park was then opened to the public.

== Places and Monuments ==
- The Church of All Saints
- The Chapel of La Grande Bruyère
- The war memorial for the 1914-18 and 1940-45 wars
- The “crêtes à cayaux” (literally “ridge of stones”), dry-stone or mortar-built walls with a crowning formed by vertically placed stones, partially or entirely delimiting properties, mainly along the streets of l’Enfer, de la Montagne, de Condé, and Émile Zola.

== Notable residents ==
- Victor Martin, a Belgian Resistance member and academic sociologist who was sent to report on allegations of mass-murder of Jews in Poland for the resistance in 1943.
- Luce Irigaray, a feminist philosopher and linguist who was born in Blaton in 1930.

== Gallery ==
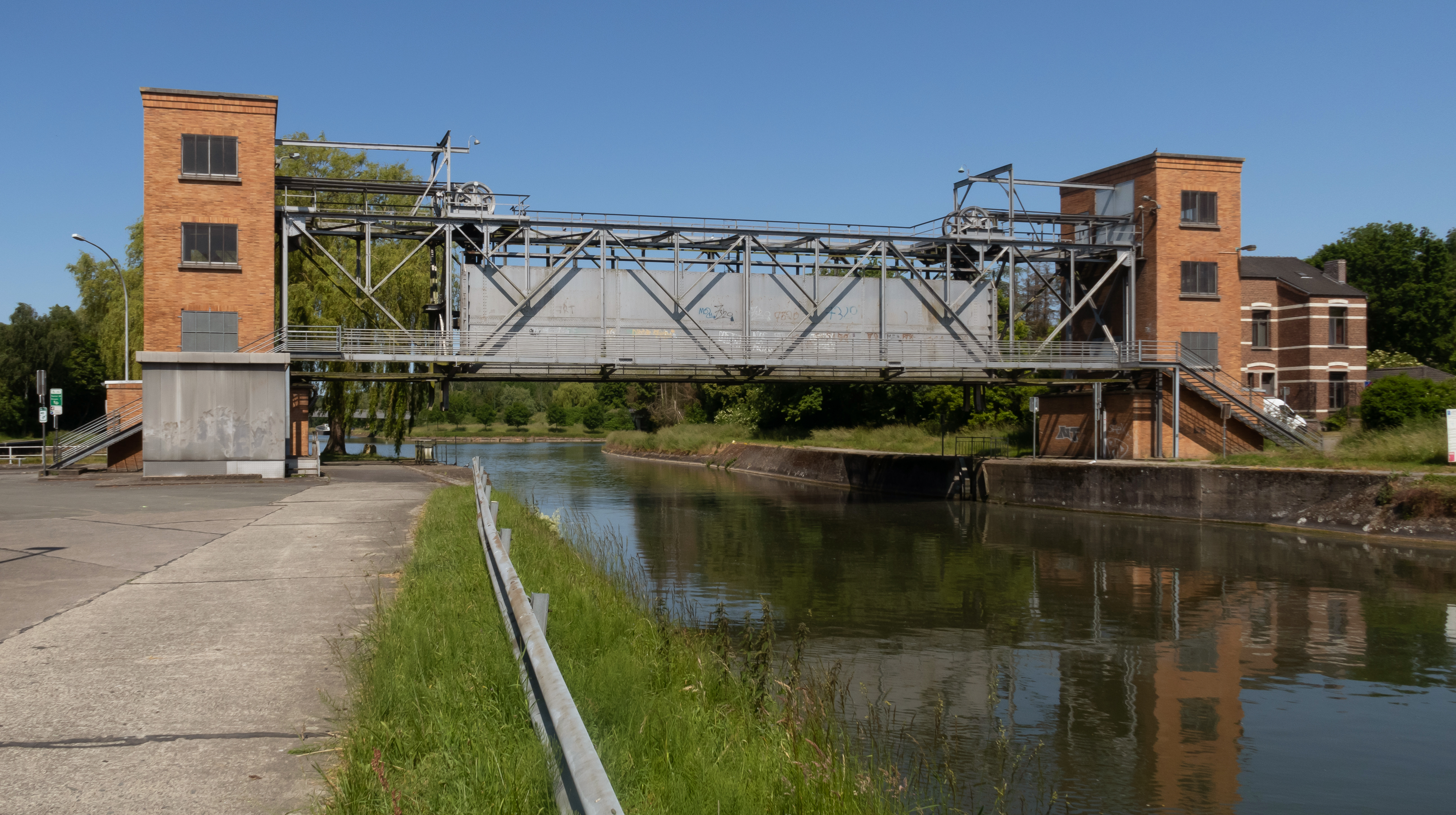
Pedestrian bridge near Blaton.

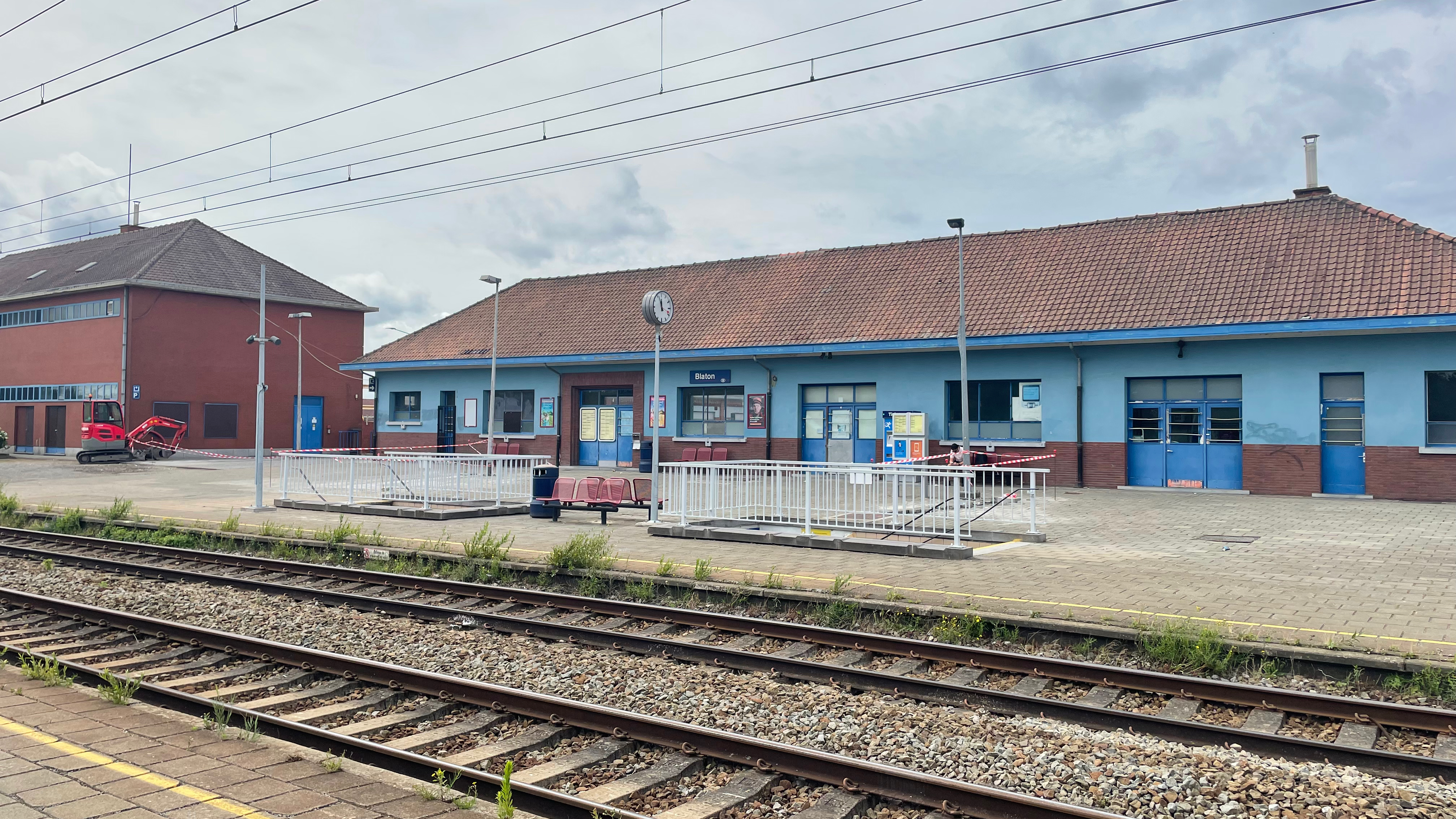
Blaton train station.

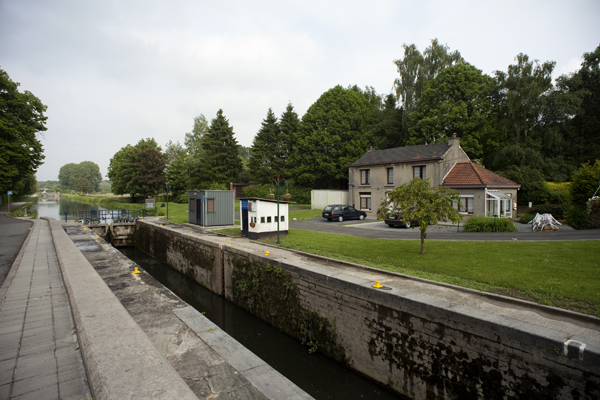
Blaton-Ath canal.

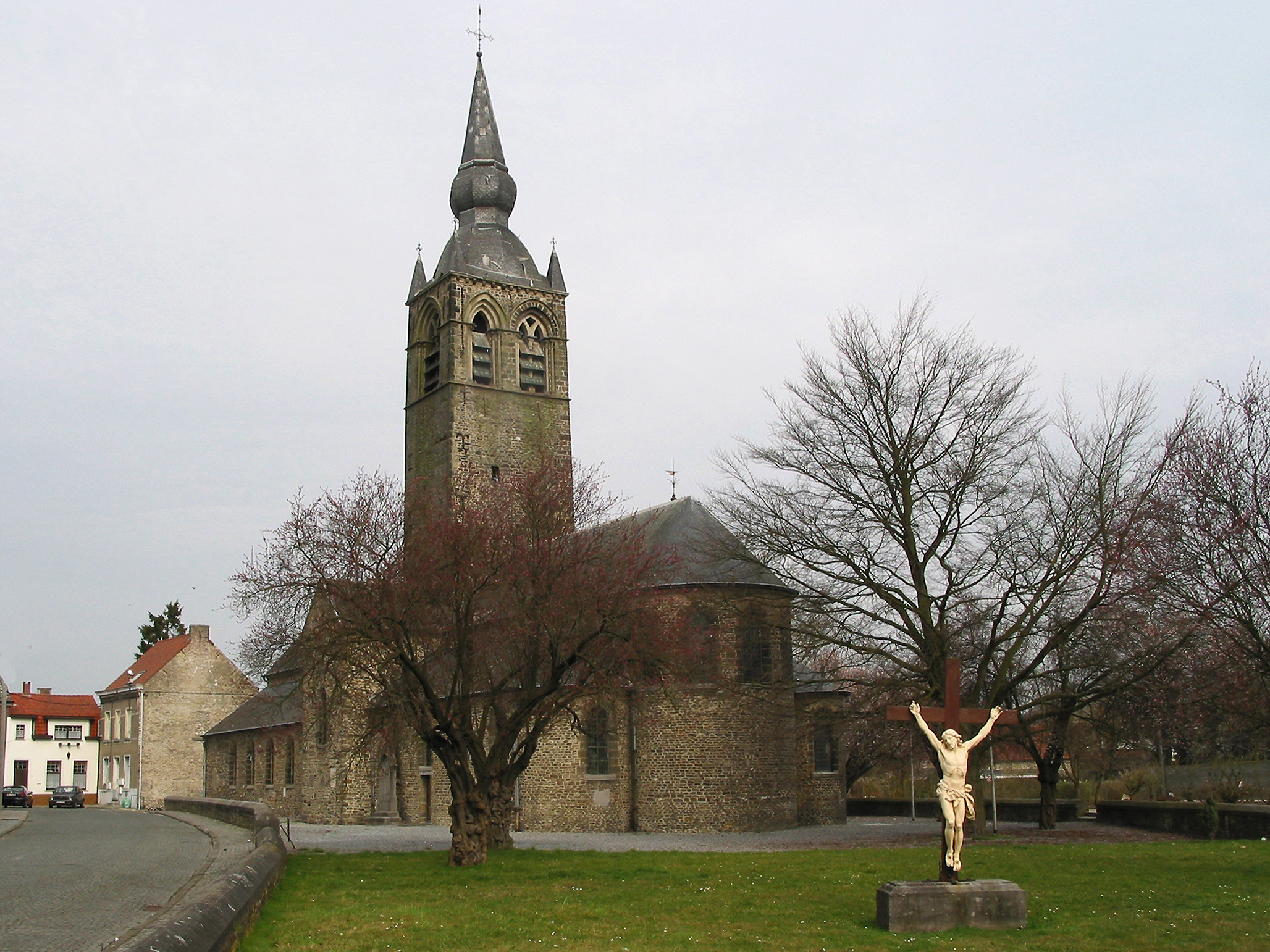
All the Saints church.

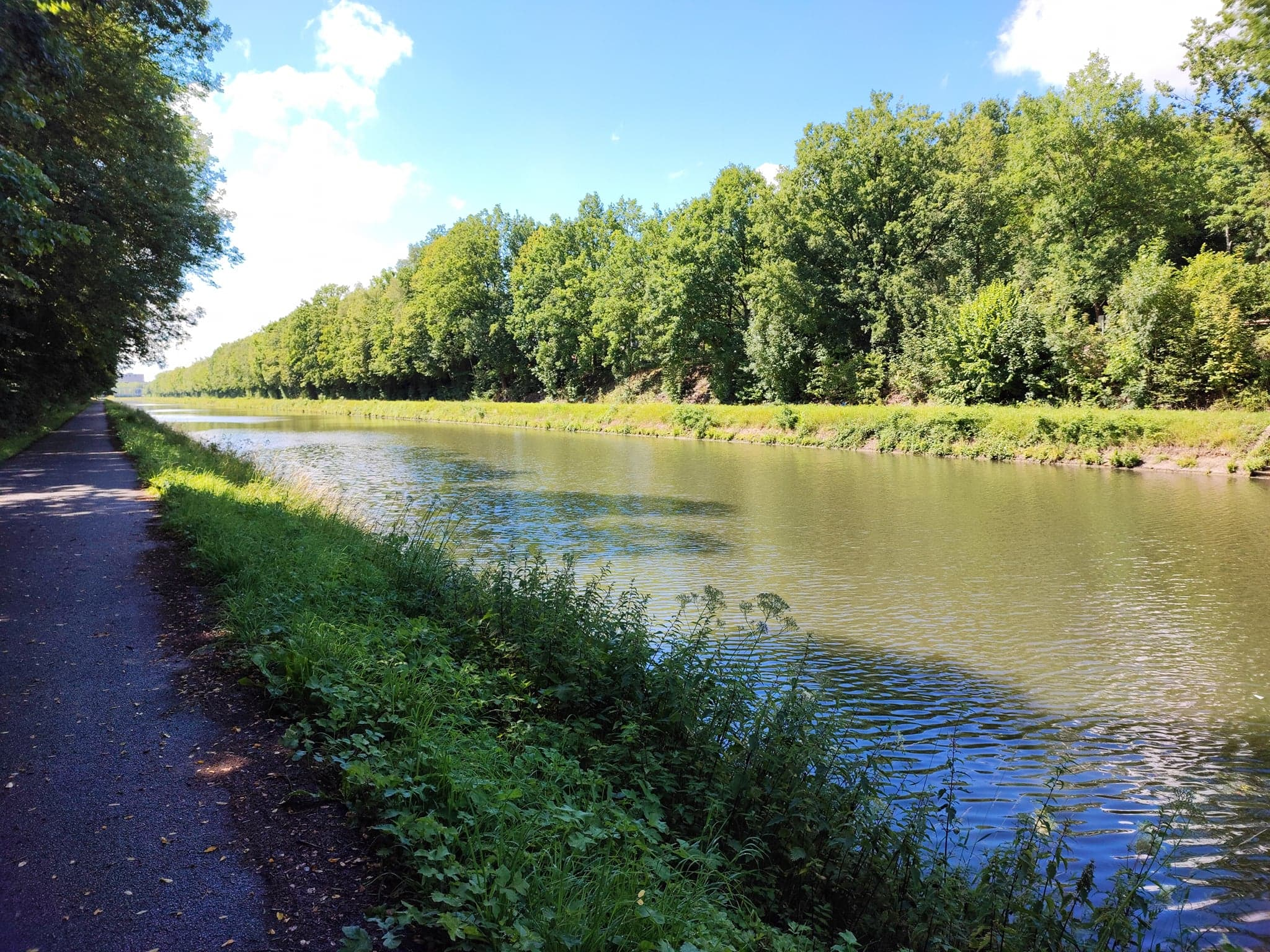
Nimy-Blaton-Péronnes canal.
