= Hidulf of Lobbes =

Frankish saint

Saint Hydulphe of Lobbes
- Born: Hydulphe; Austrasia, Francia
- Died: 23 June 707 AD; Pagus Hainoensis, Austrasia, Francia
- Venerated in: Roman Catholic Church
- Feast: 23 June

Hydulphe, Hydulphus, Hidulphe, Hidulf, commonly known as Hydulphe of Lobbes (French: Hydulphe de Lobbes) was a Frankish saint who helped Saint Landelin establish Lobbes Abbey, Crespin Abbey, and Aulne Abbey.

== Biography ==
Saint Hydulphe was born in c. 630 AD in Austrasia, Francia during the Middle Ages.

He was the grandson of Walbert III. His father, Brunulphe II, was the son of Brunulphe of Cambrésis.

Hydulphe became the husband of Saint Aye, his cousin and the daughter of Brunulphe, Count of the Ardennes (Saint Walbert IV's younger brother). Aye's mother was Vraie (or Vraye) Freya, daughter of the lord of Boulogne. Hydulphe married Aye of the Ardennes around 655 AD, a match arranged by his parents at the instance of the King of the Franks. Upon marrying, they made a shared vow of continence.

Following the counsel of Saint Ghislain, Saint Waltrude planned to withdraw to the mountain of Châteaulieu and requested Hydulphe to negotiate for the land and build a place dedicated to prayer. Following Saint Waltrude's wishes, Hydulphe built a spacious house at Châteaulieu, but after a hurricane levelled it, he replaced it with a simpler hermitage and oratory to Saint Peter, marking the early beginnings of modern-day Mons. He also helped Landelin establish the Lobbes Abbey, Crespin Abbey, and Aulne Abbey, living nearby at Mont Hydulphe. Hydulphe, no longer content with founding and protecting monasteries, sought to renounce his wealth.

After a few years of marriage, he and his wife separated to fully commit themselves to God. Hydulphe entered the Abbey of Lobbes, a Benedictine monastery in Lobbes in the pagus Hainoensis. His wife entered the convent of Châteaulieu or Castriloc (now Mons) with her relative Saint Waltrude. When his wife consecrated herself to God in the solitude of Châteaulieu, Hydulphe ceded all his possessions to the monastery of Lobbes. Hydulphe, in a 691 patent, granted his abbey over 100 villages and surrounding lands, meadows, and woods, with full rights and no possibility of future claims. He then spent his life as a monk at Lobbes Abbey.

== Death ==
Hydulphe died on 23 June 707 AD in Lobbes, in the pagus Hainoensis, Austrasia, Francia (now Hainaut Province, Belgium). The feast day of Saint Hydulphe was formerly celebrated in Lobbes and Binche on 23 June.

In the 15th century, the relics of Saint Hydulphe were moved to Binche and became part of the church of Sainte Marie's eight relics. A bone from his arm was left in Lobbes, and his head was preserved in a silver reliquary at the church.

== See also ==
- Saint Aye
- Lobbes Abbey
