= Charibert II =

King of Aquitaine from 629 to 632

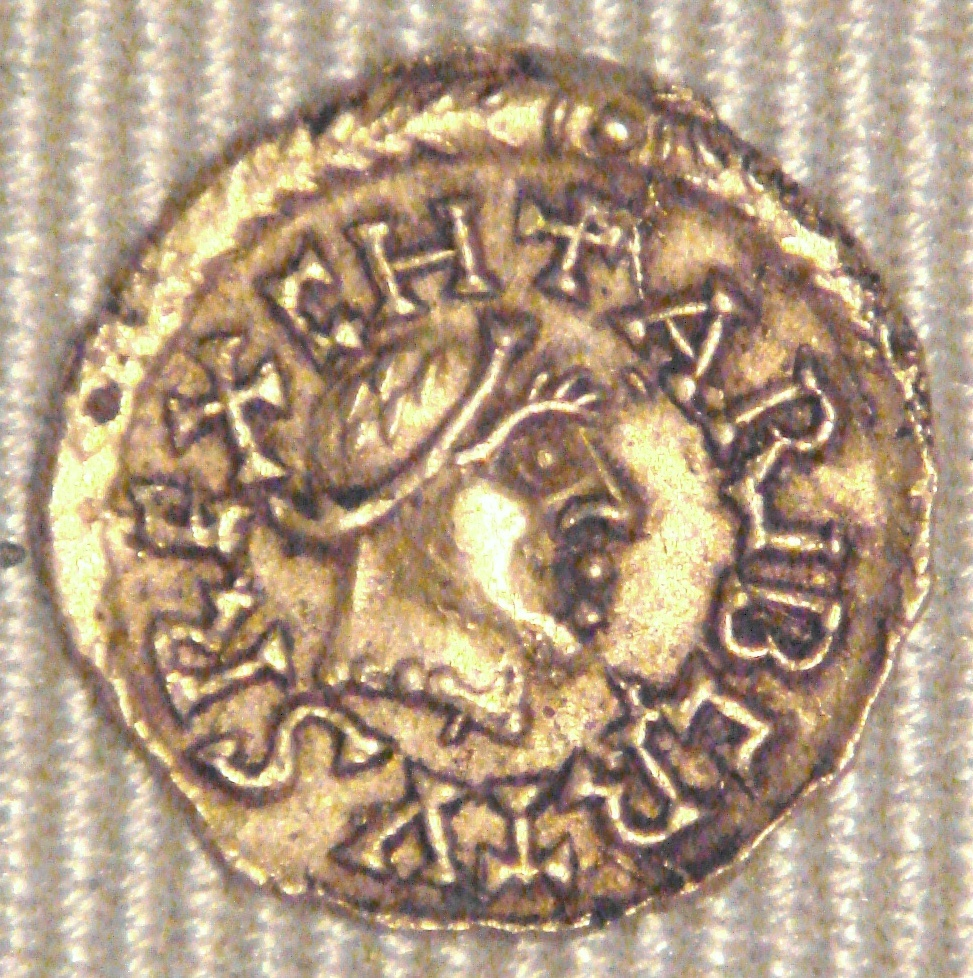
- Tremissis of Charibert II, minted at Banassac, bearing his effigy and name.

King of Aquitaine
- Reign: 18 October 629 – 632
- Predecessor: Clotaire II (as King of the Franks)
- Successor: Chilperic
- Born: c. 607
- Died: c. 632 (aged 24–25); Vitry-en-Artois
- Spouse: Gisela (disputed); Fulberte
- Issue: Chilperic
- Dynasty: Merovingian
- Father: Clotaire II
- Mother: Sichilde

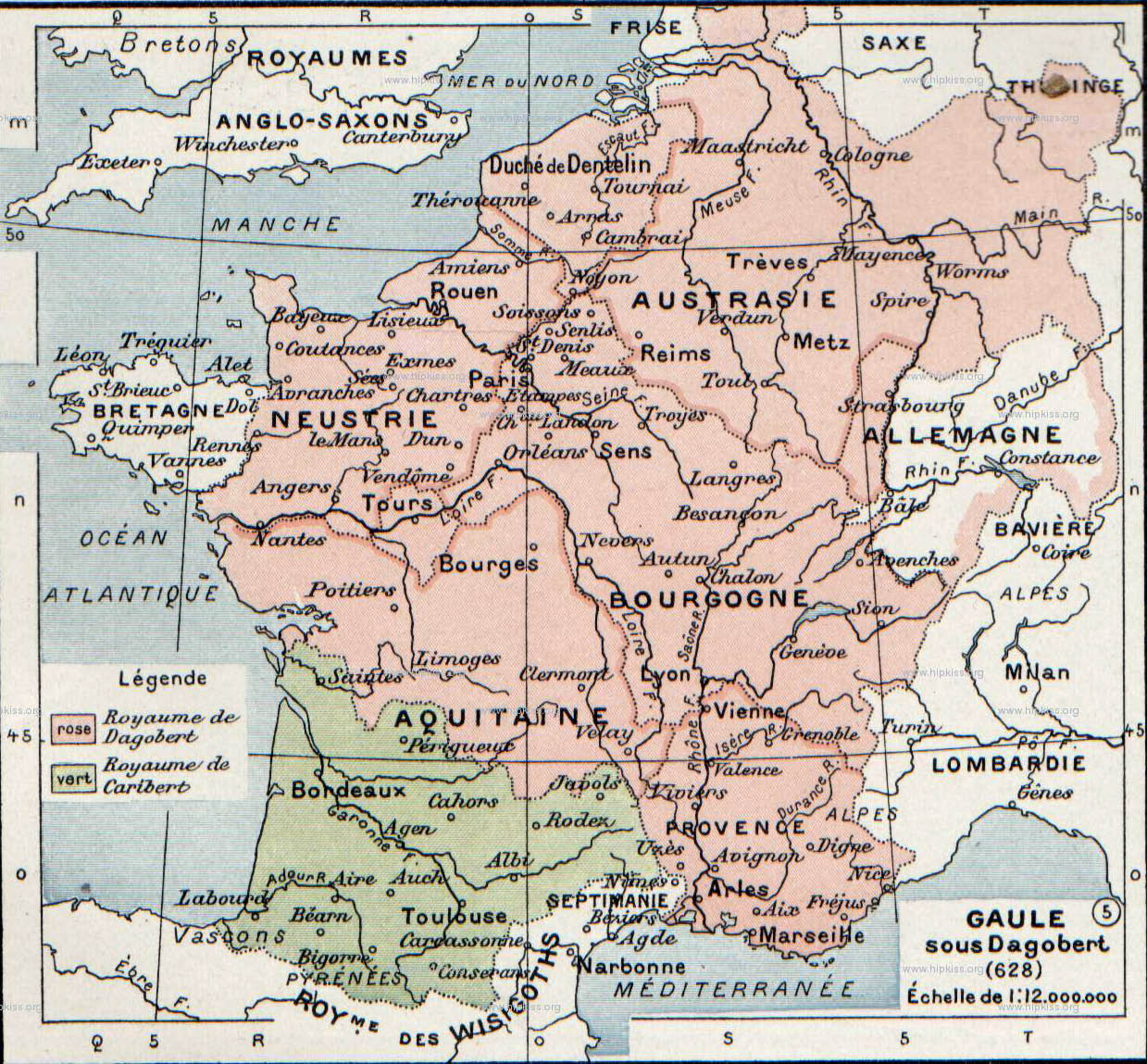
The Frankish kingdoms, showing Charibert's kingdom in green

Charibert II (607 – 8 April 632), a son of Clotaire II and his junior wife Sichilde, was the first King of Aquitaine from 629 to his death, with his capital at Toulouse. There are no direct statements about when Charibert was born exactly, the only known fact being that he was "a few years younger" than his half-brother Dagobert. His father Clotaire evidently had a bigamous marriage (not then uncommon) and he was the offspring of the junior wife.

When his father, Clotaire II, King of the Franks, died in 629, Charibert made a bid for the kingdom of Neustria against his elder half-brother Dagobert I, who had already been king of Austrasia since 623. In the ensuing negotiations, Charibert was represented by his uncle Brodulf, the brother of Queen Sichilde. Dagobert had Brodulf killed, but did not intercede when his half-brother took over the near-independent realm of Aquitaine. Apparently this caused no disagreement, as in 631 Charibert stood godfather to Dagobert's son Sigebert.

Charibert's realm included Toulouse, Cahors, Agen, Périgueux, and Saintes, to which he added his possessions in Gascony. Charibert was married to Gisela, the daughter of Amand, Ruler of the Gascons. His fighting force subdued the resistance of the Basques, until the whole Novempopulania (became Duchy of Vasconia) was under his control.

In 632, Charibert died at Blaye, Gironde, and soon after that his infant son Chilperic was killed. Aquitaine passed again to Dagobert. Both Charibert and his son are buried in the early Romanesque Basilica of Saint-Romain at Blaye.

Charibert II Merovingian dynasty Born: 607/618 Died: 632
Preceded by Clotaire II	King of Aquitaine; 629–632	Succeeded by Chilperic
