= Saint Aye =

Belgian Catholic saint (died c.711)

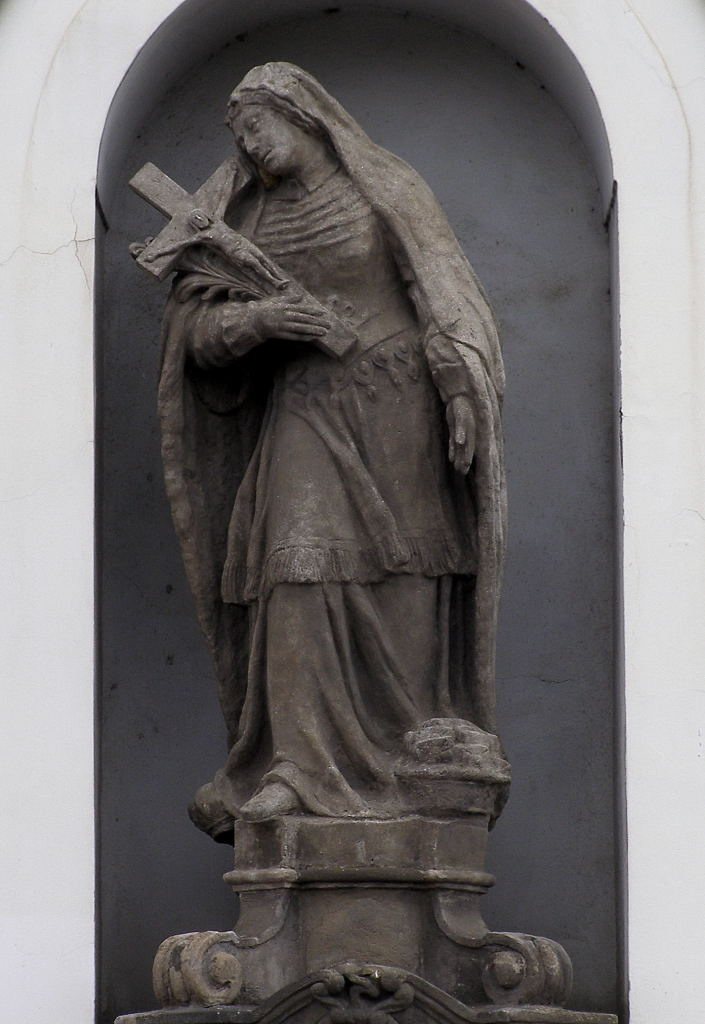
- Statue of Saint Aya
- Died: ~711; Belgium
- Venerated in: Roman Catholic Church
- Feast: April 18
- Patronage: lawsuits

Aye (died c. 711) was a Frankish Catholic saint. She has been referred to also as Aia, Aya, Agia, and St. Austregildis.

She is sometimes confused with another St. Agia, the mother of the French Saint Loup of Sens.

Aye is revered by the Beguines of Belgium. Her Feast Day is April 18.^{.}

Little is known about Aye's early life or date of birth, but available sources state that she was the daughter of Brunulphe I, Count of the Adrennes and a relative of Saint Waldetrudis. She was married to Saint Hidulf (or Hydulphe) of Hainault until both decided to enter religious life, after which point they parted ways.

Aye joined the Abbey of Mons in Belgium, where she became a nun, and gave her property away to the nuns of Saint Waldetrudis. The date of her death is not concretely known as sources place her death around the year 707 as well as 714.

Aye is known as the patron saint of lawsuits. She is believed to have gained the title due to a lawsuit that decided "her heirs against the Canonesses of Mons". A variant legend states that she righted an injustice by speaking from beyond the grave.
