= Chronological list of saints in the 8th century =

A list of people, who died during the 8th century, who have received recognition as Blessed (through beatification) or Saint (through canonization) from the Catholic Church:

Name	Birth	Birthplace	Death	Place of death	Notes
Mauruntius	634		701		
Berlinda (Berlindis, Bellaude)			702		
Colman of Lismore			702		Bishop of Lismore
Paduinus (Pavin of Le Mans)			703		
Adamnan He was a member of the Northern Uí Néill lineage Cenél Conaill.	624		704		
Austreberta (Eustreberta)			704		
Trumwin			704		Bishop of the Picts
Bertulf (Bertoul)			705		
Bosa of York			705		Bishop of York
Hedda			705		Bishop of Winchester
Bonitus (Bonet)	623		706		Bishop of Clermont
Decuman (Dagan)			706		
Hiduiphus (Hidulf, Hidulphus)			707		Bishop of Trier
Tetricus			707		Bishop of Auxerre
Aldhelm (Adelemus, Athelmas, Adelnie, Eadelhelm, Aedelhem)	639		709		Bishop of Sherborne
Wilfrid	634		709		Bishop of York
Adrian of Canterbury			710		Archbishop of Canterbury
Damian			710		Bishop of Pavia
Emebert			710		Bishop of Cambrai
Erentrude			710		
Indractus, Dominica, and Companions			710		
Rupert of Salzburg (Robert of Hrodbert)			710		Bishop of Worms
Bain			711		Bishop of Thérouanne
Gudula			712		
Vindician			712		Bishop of Arras-Cambrai
Suitbert of Kaiserswerdt (Suitbert)	647		713		
Ursmar			713		
Elfleda (Edifleda, Elfeda, Elgiva, Ethelfieda)			714		
Guthlac	673		714		
Notburga			714		
Adalsindis			715		
Fructus			715		
Milburga			715		
Richimir			715		
Ceolfrith	642		716		
Donald			716		
Dúnchad mac Cinn Fáelad			717		
Egwin			717		Bishop of Worcester
John of Atares			718		
Leothade			718		Bishop of Auch
Pega			719		
Evremond (Ebremund)			720		
Hermenland (Erblon, Herbland, Hermel)			720		
Meneleus (Mauvier, Menele)			720		
Odilia (Ottilia)			720		
Richard of Lucca			720		
Sacerdos of Limoges (Sardon, Serdot)			720		Bishop of Limoges
Thomas de Maurienne (Thomas of Farfa)			720		Abbot of Farfa
Vodalus (Voel, Vodoaldus)			720		
Wulframn			720		Bishop of Sens
Eadfrith of Lindisfarne			721		
John of Beverley			721		Bishop of York
Liutwin (Ludwin)			722		Bishop of Trier
Malrubius (Maelrubha)	642		722		
Modestus			722		Bishop of Carinthia
Oda			723		
Giles			724		
Voloc			724		
Aubert of Avranches (Autbert)			725		Bishop of Avranches
Benedict of Milan			725		
Benignus			725		
Beregisius			725		
Bertha of Artois	650		725		
Cuthburh			725		
Gobrain			725		Bishop of Vannes
Paternus			726		
Perseveranda (Pezaine)			726		
Willeic (Willeich, Willaik, Velleicus)			726		
Hubert of Liège			727		Bishop of Liège
Cele-Christ			728		Bishop of Leinster
Egbert	640		729		Bishop of Iona
Adele			730		
Corbinian			730		Bishop of Friesling
Fergus (Fergus of Scotland)			730		
Hugh			730		Bishop of Rouen
Julian			730		
Moderan (Moran, Moderammus)			730		Bishop of Rennes
Romulus the Abbot			730		
Salvius of Angoulême			730		Bishop of Angoulême
Altigianus and Hilarinus			731		
Brithwald (Berhtwald)			731		
Gregory II	669		731		Pope
Marinus			731		
Winewald (Winebald)			731		Abbot of Beverley
Aventinus			732		
Germanus of Constantinople	634		732		
Porcarius and Companions			732		
Theofrid (Theofredus)			732		Abbot of Le Monastier
Bercthun			733		Abbot of Beverley
Britwin			733		Abbot of Beverley
Tola			733		Bishop of Meath
Bilihildis of Altmünster			734		
Kentigerna			734		
Tatwine			734		
Bede	672		735		
Frideswide			735		
Hypatius and Andrew			735		
Peter			735		Bishop of Pavia
Theodota of Constantinople			735		
Pardulphus (Pardulf, Pardoux)	657		737		
Agofredus (Geoffrey)			738		
Leutfridus (Leufroy)			738		
Engelmund			739		
Lucerius			739		
Samthann			739		
Willibrord	658		739		
Acca			740		Bishop of Hexham
Adalbert of Egmond			740		
Andrew of Crete	660		740		
Ebbo			740		Bishop of Sens
Nothelm			740		
Pharaildis (Varelde, Veerle, or Verylde)			740		
Vitalis			740		
Attala	687		741		
Eutychius (Eustathius) and Companions			741		
Gregory III			741		Pope
Eucherius of Orléans			743		
Peter the Scribe			743		
Withburga			743		
Wilfrid the Younger			744		Bishop of York
Adeloga (Hadeloga)			745		
Rigobert (Robert)			745		
Theodosia and Companions			745		
Vitalis			745		
Floribert of Liège			746		Bishop of Liège
Gerulph			746		
Widradus (Ware)			747		
Wigbert			747		
Blessed Petronax	600		747		
John of Damascus	676		749		
Wicterp (Wicho)			749		Bishop of Augsburg
Amulwinus			750		Bishop of Lobbes
Anselm			750		
Dodo			750		
Froduiphus (Frou)			750		
Gundelindis (Gwendoline)			750		
Helena (Heliada)			750		
Himelin			750		
John the Wonder-Worker			750		Bishop of Polybatum
Juliana of Pavilly ("Little Sister of Jesus")			750		
Peter			750		Bishop of Damascus
Relindis (Renule)			750		
Severa			750		
Theophilus			750		
Turiaf of Dol			750		Bishop of Dol
Ulphia			750		
Votus, Felix, brothers and hermits, and John (John de Atares)			750		
Abel			751		
Agilulfus (Agilulf)			751		
Edburga of Minster-in-Thanet			751		
Ambrose			752		Bishop of Cahors
Cillene			752		
Hildebert			752		
Zachary			752		Pope
Pirminus (Pirmin)			753		
Adalar			754		
Boniface	672?		754		Archbishop of Mainz
Burchard (Burkard)			754		Bishop of Würzburg
Eoban			754		
Waccar			755		
Balther (Baldred)			756		
Lotharius			756		Bishop of Seez
Blessed Wando (Vando)			756		
Bertha of Bingen			757		
Cuthbert			758		
Othmar			759		
Albinus (Witta)			760		Bishop of Buraburg
Alto			760		
Cosmas			760		Bishop of Majuma
Gangulphus (Gengulf, Gengoul)			760		
Paul of Cyprus			760		
Sabinus			760		Bishop of Catania
Stephen of Surozh			760		Bishop of Surozh
Vulgis			760		
Wastrada			760		
Werenfrid			760		
Winebald			761		
Fidharleus			762		
Garibaldus			762		Bishop of Regensburg
Marchelm			762		
Martyrs of Ephesus			762		
Bregwin (Breguivine)			764		
Ceolwulf			764		
Stephen the Younger	713/715		765		
Guitmarus			765		
Walfrid			765		
Bobinus			766		Bishop of Troyes
Chrodegang	715		766		
Andrew of Crete			767		
Echa (Etha)			767		
Emilion			767		
Paul I			767		Pope
Anglinus			768		
James the Deacon			769		
James			769		Bishop of Toul
Lantfrid			770		
Opportuna			770		
Philip of Zell			770		
Sabinianus			770		
Sebaldus			770		
Amalberga of Temse			772		
Remigius			772		Bishop of Rouen
Tetta			772		
Amicus			773		
Lebuin (Liafwine)			773		
Hippolytus			775		Bishop of Saint Claude
Plechelm			775		
Rumold (Rombaut)			775		Bishop of Mechelen
Gregory of Utrecht	703		776		
Theodulphus (Thiou)			776		Bishop of Lobbes
Vitalian			776		Bishop of Osimo
Magdalveus (Mauve)			776 or 777		Bishop of Verdun
Ambrose Autpert			778		
Sturmi			779		
Walburga	710		779		
Basilissa			780		
Credan			780		
Mella			780		
Alcmund (Alchmund)			781		Bishop of Hexham
Lioba (Liobgetha)			781		
Thomas of Antioch			782		
Libert			783		
Blessed Hildegard			783		
Alberic			784		Bishop of Utrecht
Fulrad			784		
Vergilius of Salzburg (Virgil, Fergal, Ferghil, Vergilius, Virgilius, Feargal)	700		784		Bishop of Salzburg
Herulph (Hariolfus)			785		Bishop of Langres
Hiltrude	740		785		
Werburg			785		
Lull	705		786		Bishop of Mainz
Leo (Maravigloso)			787		Bishop of Catania
Siagrius			787		Bishop of Nice
Willibald	700		787		Bishop of Eichstatt
Theophilus the Younger			789		
Tilbert			789		Bishop of Hexham
Willehad			789		Bishop of Worms
Agatha			790		
Desideratus			790		
Felix of Fritzlar			790		
Ribert (Ribarius)			790		
Thecla of Kitsingen			790		
Winnoc			790		
Wiomad (Wiomagus, Weomadus)			790		Bishop of Trier
Ethelbert			794		
Megingoz (Mengold, Megingaud)			794		Bishop of Würzburg
Sol			794		
Stephen of Mar Saba	725		794		
Alfreda (Afreda, Alfritha, Aelfnryth, Etheldreda)			795		
Colga (Coelchu) ("the Wise")			796		
Gedeon			796		Bishop of Besançon
John, Sergius, and Companions			796		
Anastasius XVI			797		
Beatus of Liebana			798		
Candida			798		
Albert of Cashel			800		
Albert of Gambron			800		
Alburga			800		
Appian			800		
Arnold			800		
Attala			800		
Bernard of Bagnorea			800		Bishop of Vulcia
Epiphania			800		
Gamelbert	720		800		
John			800		Bishop of Heraclea

== See also ==
- Christianity in the 8th century
