= Epiphania =

Epiphania or Epiphaneia (Ancient Greek: Ἐπιφανεία) is the feminine form of the name Epiphanius, and may refer to:

- Hama, Syria, formerly known as Epiphania
- Epiphania (Bithynia), a town of ancient Bithynia
- Epiphania (Cilicia), a city in Cilicia, now ruined
- Epiphaneia (horse), a race horse
- Eudoxia Epiphania, daughter of the Byzantine Emperor Heraclius
- Saint Epiphania of Pavia, an 8th-century Italian nun
- Epiphania, a poem by George Seferis
  - The musical setting of this poem by Mikis Theodorakis
- The Christian festival of Epiphany
