= Berhthun =

Berhthun or Beorhthun is an Anglo-Saxon name that can refer to:

- Berthun of Sussex (died c. 685), Sussex nobleman
- Berhthun (bishop) (died c. 778), Bishop of Lichfield
- Bercthun (died 773), also known as Beorhthun, Northumbrian Benedictine monk and saint
