= Bertulf =

Bertulf may refer to:

- Bertulf (archbishop of Trier) (died 883)
- Saint Bertulf of Bobbio, (died 640), German convert to Christianity
- Saint Bertulf of Renty, (died 705), German convert to Christianity
