= Gül Mosque =

Former Eastern Orthodox church in Istanbul, Turkey

Gül Mosque Gül Câmîi
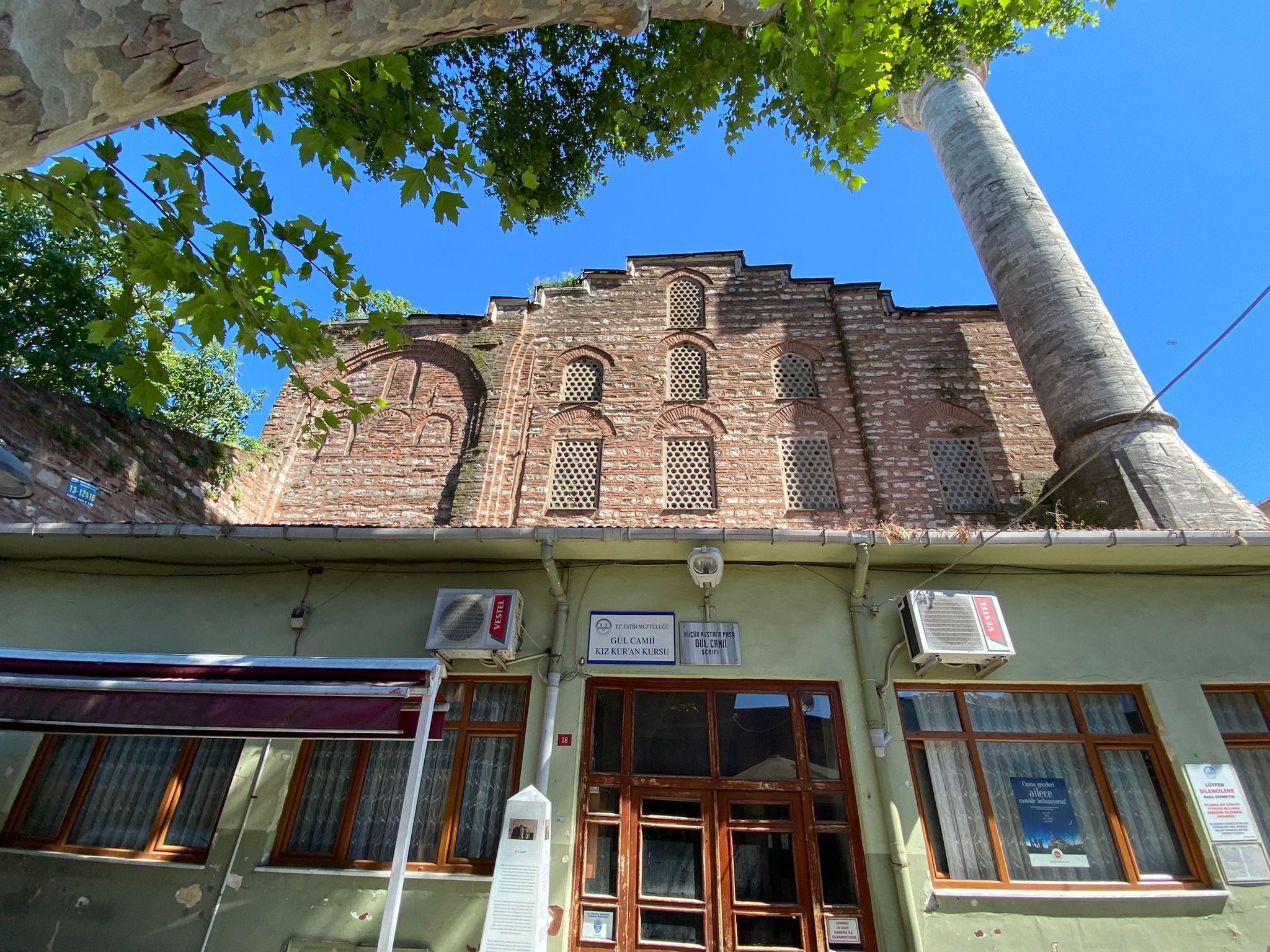

- Located in the Fatih district of Istanbul

Religion
- Affiliation: Sunni Islam
- Year consecrated: Late 10th-century church; converted into mosque 1490

Location
- Location: Istanbul, Turkey
- Coordinates: 41°01′36.00″N 28°57′23.40″E

Architecture
- Type: church with cross-in-square plan
- Style: Middle Byzantine - Comnenian

Specifications
- Length: 26 m (85 ft)
- Width: 20 m (66 ft)
- Minaret: 1
- Materials: brick, stone

Gül Mosque (Turkish: Gül Camii, meaning Rose Mosque' in English) is a former Byzantine church in Istanbul, Turkey, converted into a mosque by the Ottomans.

It is in Vakıf Mektebi Sokak in the district of Fatih, Istanbul, in the neighbourhood of Ayakapı ('Gate of the Saint'). It lies at the end of the valley which divides the fourth and fifth hills of Constantinople and overlooks the Golden Horn from its imposing position .

== Problem of identification ==
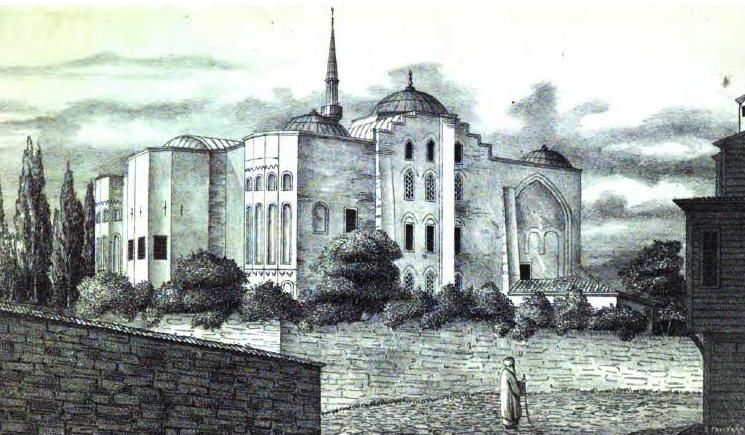
Gül Mosque in drawing of 1877, from A.G. Paspates' Byzantine Topographical Studies

Although the Gül Mosque was one of the most important Byzantine buildings in Constantinople, its dedication and the date of its construction have been disputed by scholars. It is sometimes identified with the church belonging to the nunnery of Saint Theodosia (Greek: Μονή τής Άγιας Θεοδοσίας εν τοις Δεξιοκράτους, Monē tis Hagias Theodosias en tois Dexiokratous) or with that of the monastery of Christ the Benefactor (Greek: Μονή του Χριστού του Ευεργέτου, Monē tou Christou tou Euergetou).

After Stephan Gerlach visited it in the late 15th century, the building was always identified as the church of Hagia Theodosia en tois Dexiokratous. However, at the beginning of the last century, Jules Pargoire identified it instead as the church of Hagia Euphēmia en tō Petriō, built during the reign of Basil I (867–886), and explained why he thought this was the case. After studies aimed at the dating of the basement in the 1960s, the German archaeologist Hartmut Schäfer estimated the date of the church's construction as between the end of the eleventh and the first half of the 12th century, placing it in the Komnenian period, and identifying it hypothetically as the church of the monastery of Christos Euergetēs. He refuted the idea that the Gül Mosque was the building where the body of Hagia Theodosia was brought at the end of the Iconoclasm period. On the other hand, he did not exclude the possibility that the building could have been dedicated to Hagia Theodosia at a later period.

== History ==
=== Byzantine period ===
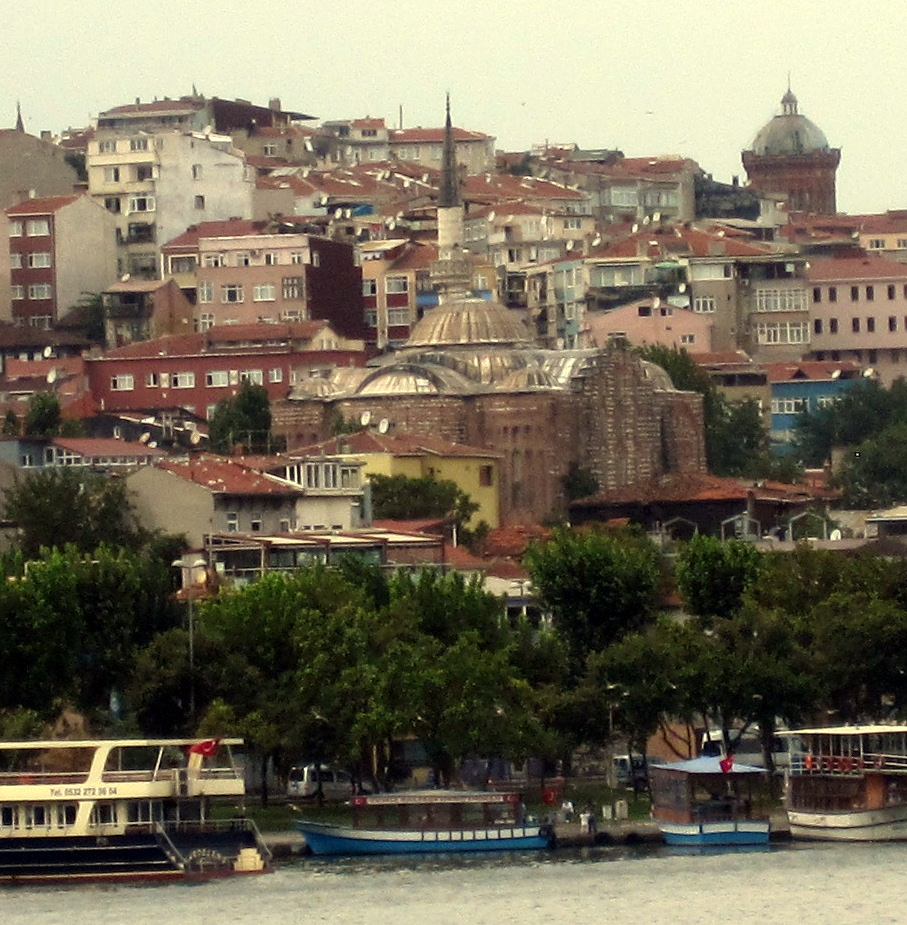
The mosque seen from Atatürk Bridge on the Golden Horn. In the background, the Fener quarter with the dome of the Megali tou Gènous scholè, the largest Rûm (Greek) school in Istanbul

On January 19, 729, at the very beginning of the iconoclastic persecutions, Emperor Leo III the Isaurian ordered the removal of an image of Christ which stood over the Chalkē, the main gate of the Great Palace of Constantinople. While an officer was executing the order, a group of women gathered to prevent the operation, and one of them, a nun named Theodosia, caused him to fall from the ladder. The man died, and Theodosia was captured and executed.

After the end of the Iconoclasm era, Theodosia was recognized as a martyr and saint, and her body was kept and venerated in the church of Hagia Euphemia en tō Petriō, in the quarter named Dexiokratiana, after the houses owned here by one Dexiokrates. The church and adjoining monastery were erected by Emperor Basil I at the end of the ninth century. The monastery hosted his four daughters, who were all buried in the church. Hagia Euphemia lay near the Monastery of Christos Euergetēs, whose foundation date is unknown although it was restored by protosebastos John Komnenos, son of Andronikos I Komnenos and brother of co-emperor John, who died fighting in the battle of Myriokephalon in 1176. On April 12, 1204, during the Fourth Crusade, the Latin fleet gathered in front of the monastery of Christos Euergetes before attacking the city. During the period of the Latin occupation, the navy had its anchorage in front of the monastery. Many sacred relics kept in the church were looted by the Crusaders and some still exist in churches throughout western Europe.

Over time, the veneration of St Theodosia grew until, after the 11th century, the church was renamed after her. Since the original feast day of Hagia Euphemia was on 30 May, and that of another Hagia Theodosia (Hagia Theodosia of Tyros) was on 29 May, 29 May came to be accepted as the feast day of Hagia Theodosia hē Konstantinoupolitissa ('Saint Theodosia of Constantinople').

Hagia Theodosia became one of the most venerated saints in Constantinople, being invoked particularly by the infirm. Her fame increased when a deaf-mute was miraculously cured in 1306. The church was often mentioned by the Russian pilgrims who visited the city in the fourteenth and early fifteenth century, although it was sometimes confused with the nearby church of Christ Euergetēs. Twice a week there was a procession during which the relics hosted in the church were carried and a crowd of sick people followed, praying to be cured.

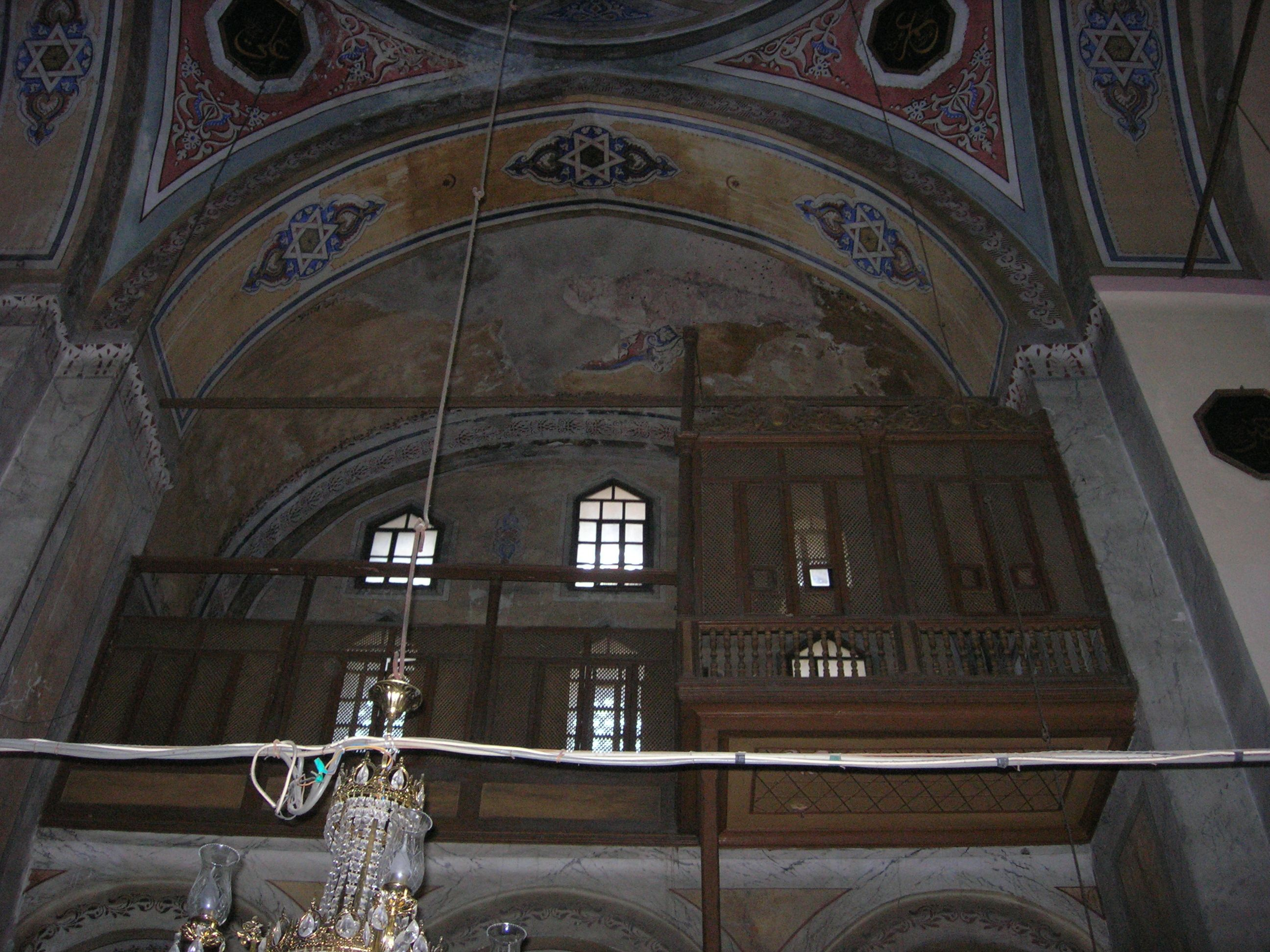
The southwest gallery with the wooden lodge for the sultan.

The church was mentioned for the last time on May 28, 1453. On that day, which was the eve both of the saint's feast and also of the end of the Byzantine Empire, the Emperor Constantine XI went with the Patriarch to pray in the church, which was adorned with garlands of roses. Afterward Constantine left for the last fight before the city fell to the Ottomans . Many people remained all the night in the church, praying for the city's salvation. After entering the city, the Ottoman troops arrived to find the church was still adorned with flowers, hence, it is thought to have been called "Rose Mosque".

After the Ottoman conquest, the basement of the church fell into ruin and was used as naval dockyard. Close to the building, Seyhülislam Molla Hüsrev Mehmet Effendi (died 1480) established a vakıf (foundation) and erected a small mosque (Küçük Mustafa Paşa Mescidi) and a bath (Küçük Mustafa Paşa Hamamı), which still exists.

In 1490, the ruined church was repaired and converted into a mosque. During the reign of Selim II, between 1566 and 1574, a minaret was erected by Hassam Pasha, a supplier to the Ottoman navy. Afterwards the mosque was often named after him. Between 1573 and 1578, during his sojourn in Istanbul, the German preacher Stephan Gerlach visited the mosque and identified it with the church of Hagia Theodosia. During that century a local holy man named Gül Baba was allegedly buried in the building. It is possible that the mosque was actually named after him.

During the 17th and 18th centuries, the upper part of the church-mosque was badly damaged by earthquakes. Eventually Sultan Murad IV restored it, rebuilding the dome and its pendentives, almost the whole west side, the vaults at the southwest and northwest corners, and the minaret.

The building escaped the fire which ravaged the quarter in 1782, and was restored again by Sultan Mahmud II (1808–1839), who added the wooden Sultan's lodge.

== Architecture ==
=== Exterior ===
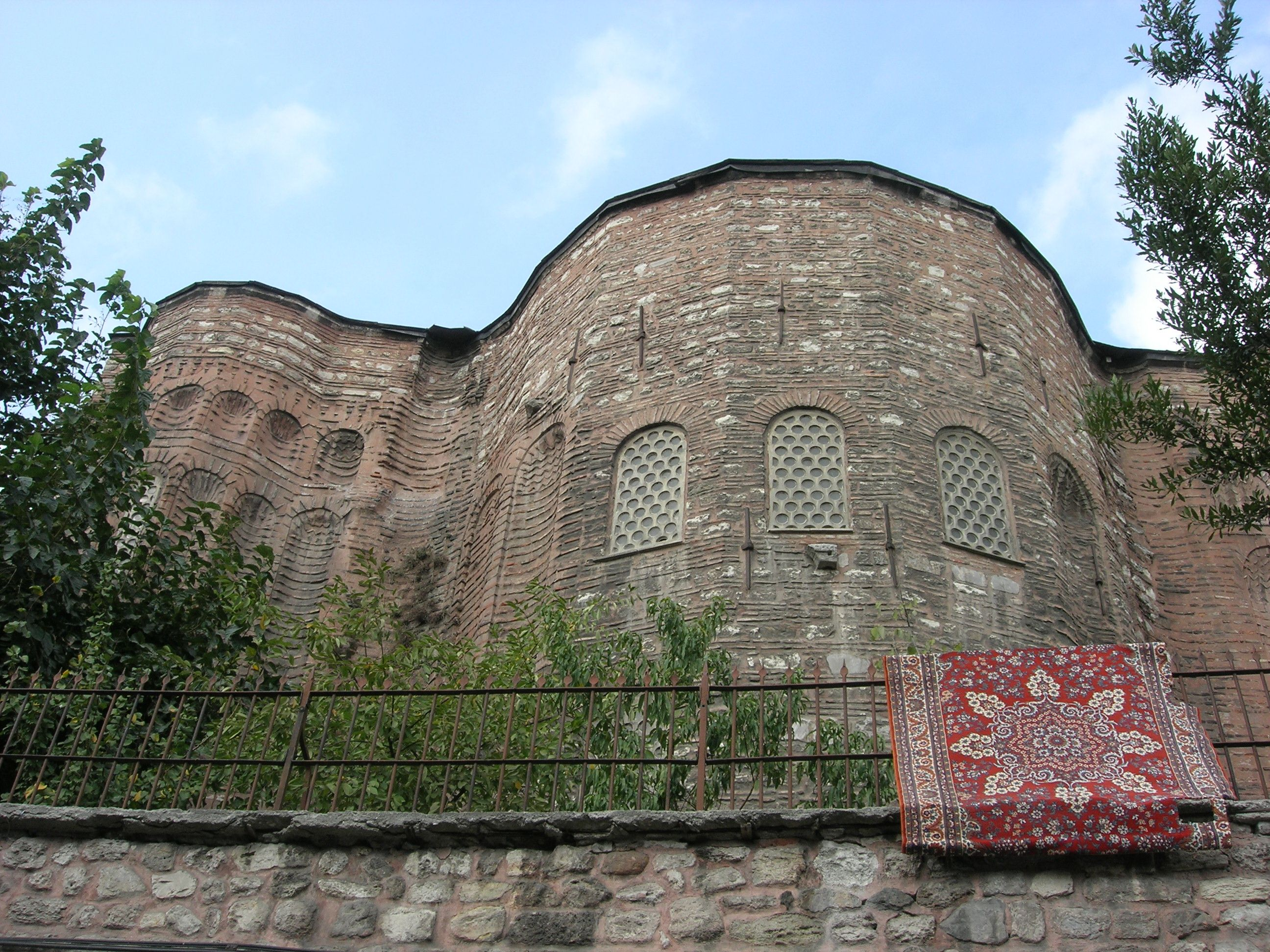
Detail of the apses as viewed from southeast. The difference in masonry between the surviving Byzantine parts (low) and the later Ottoman additions (high) can be easily noticed.

The exterior of the building is quite imposing. It stands on a high vaulted basement, which was used during the Byzantine period for secular purposes. The masonry of the basement has been built using the technique of the "recessed brick", typical of the Byzantine architecture of the middle period. In this technique, alternate courses of bricks are mounted behind the line of the wall, and are plunged in a mortar bed which means that the thickness of the mortar layers is about three times greater than that of the brick layers.

The building has a Greek cross plan, which is oriented northwest-southeast. It is 26 metres (85 feet) long and 20 metres (66 feet) wide, and is surmounted by five domes, one above the central nave and four smaller ones placed at the four corners. The central dome, which has a low external drum and no windows, is Ottoman, as are the broad pointed arches which carry it.

The original dome, like that of the Kalenderhane Mosque, should have been carried by a tall drum pierced by windows. On the southeastern façade, the central apse, with seven sides, and the lateral apses, with three sides, project boldly outwards. The central apse appears to be a later Byzantine reconstruction, since it lacks the four tiers of five niches, which feature ornamental brickwork and adorn the lateral ones. Above the niches runs a cornice.

The side apses resemble those of the Pantokrator Church and support a late dating for the building.

=== Interior ===
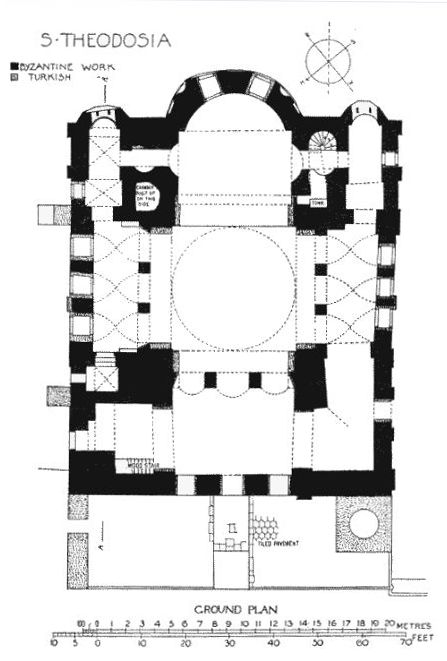
Plan of the ground floor of the mosque, after Van Millingen, Byzantine Churches in Constantinople (1912)

The entrance to the mosque is through a wooden porch, which leads to a low narthex surmounted by a barrel vault. From there a triple arcade leads into the lofty nave, which is flanked by galleries forming the side arms of the cross. They rest on a triple arcade supported by square piers. The nave ends with the main apse, which is flanked by two smaller ones. The south-east orientation of the main apse allowed the erection of the mihrab inside it.

Each gallery ends with a small chapel, which lie above the prothesis and diaconicon respectively. Both chapels are surmounted by hemispherical domes built directly above the pendentives. Light enters the building through five rows of windows, three belonging to the galleries. Some of the windows are Ottoman.

Carved inside each of the two eastern dome piers there is a small chamber. The south east chamber contains the alleged tomb of the Ottoman holy man Gül Baba. Above the entrance an inscription in Ottoman Turkish reads: "Tomb of the Apostle, disciple of Jesus. Peace be with him", which bears witness to the religious syncretism of sixteenth-century Istanbul. The chamber may originally have housed the tomb of St Theodosia. A tradition that one of the piers hides the burial place of the last Byzantine Emperor only dates back to the nineteenth century, and is groundless.

The walls of the building were plastered and decorated in the 18th century.

Together with the Eski Imaret and Vefa Kilise Mosques, the Gül Mosque is one of the most important cross-in-square churches in Istanbul.

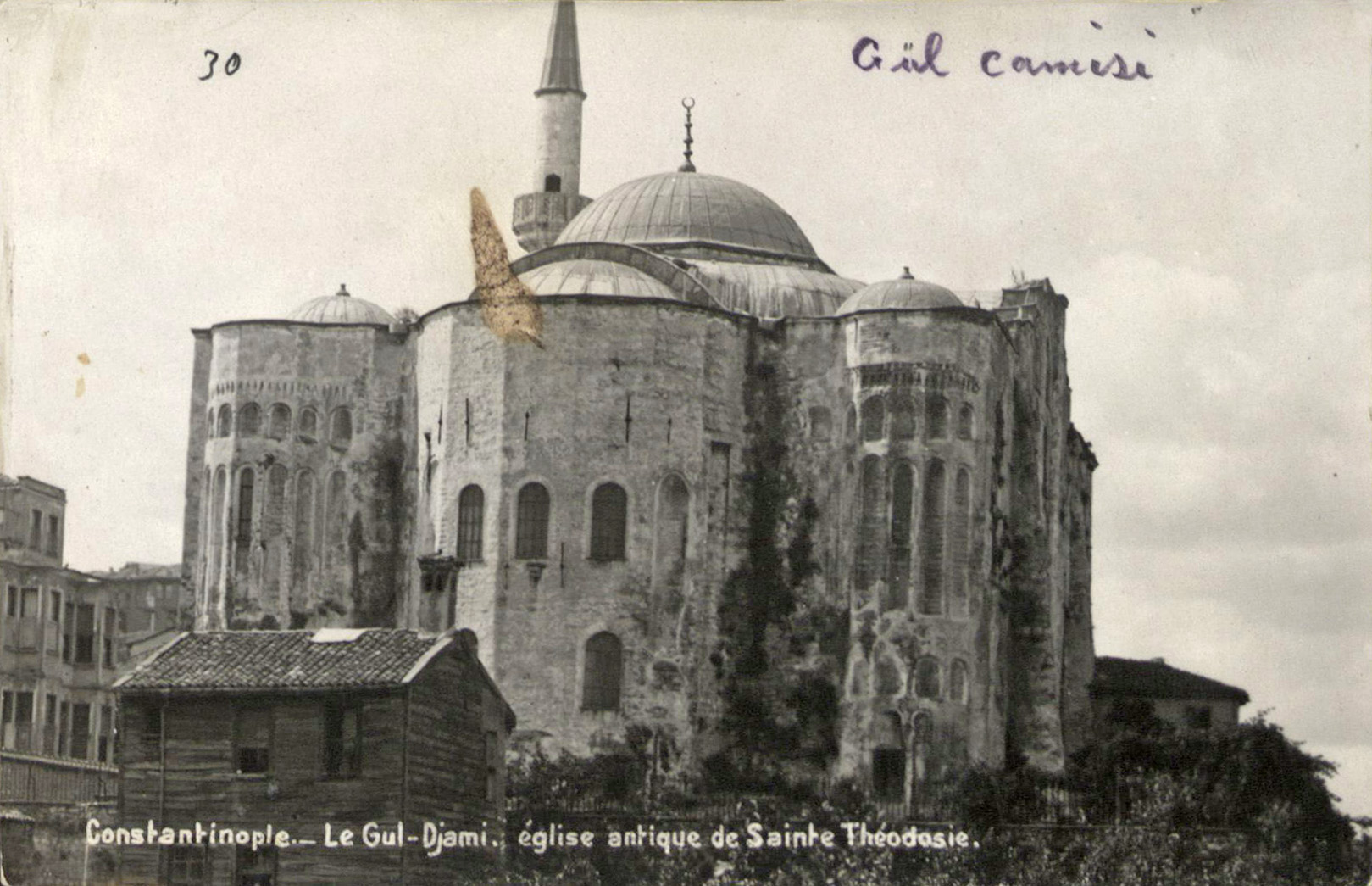
Gül Mosque in the Ottoman period

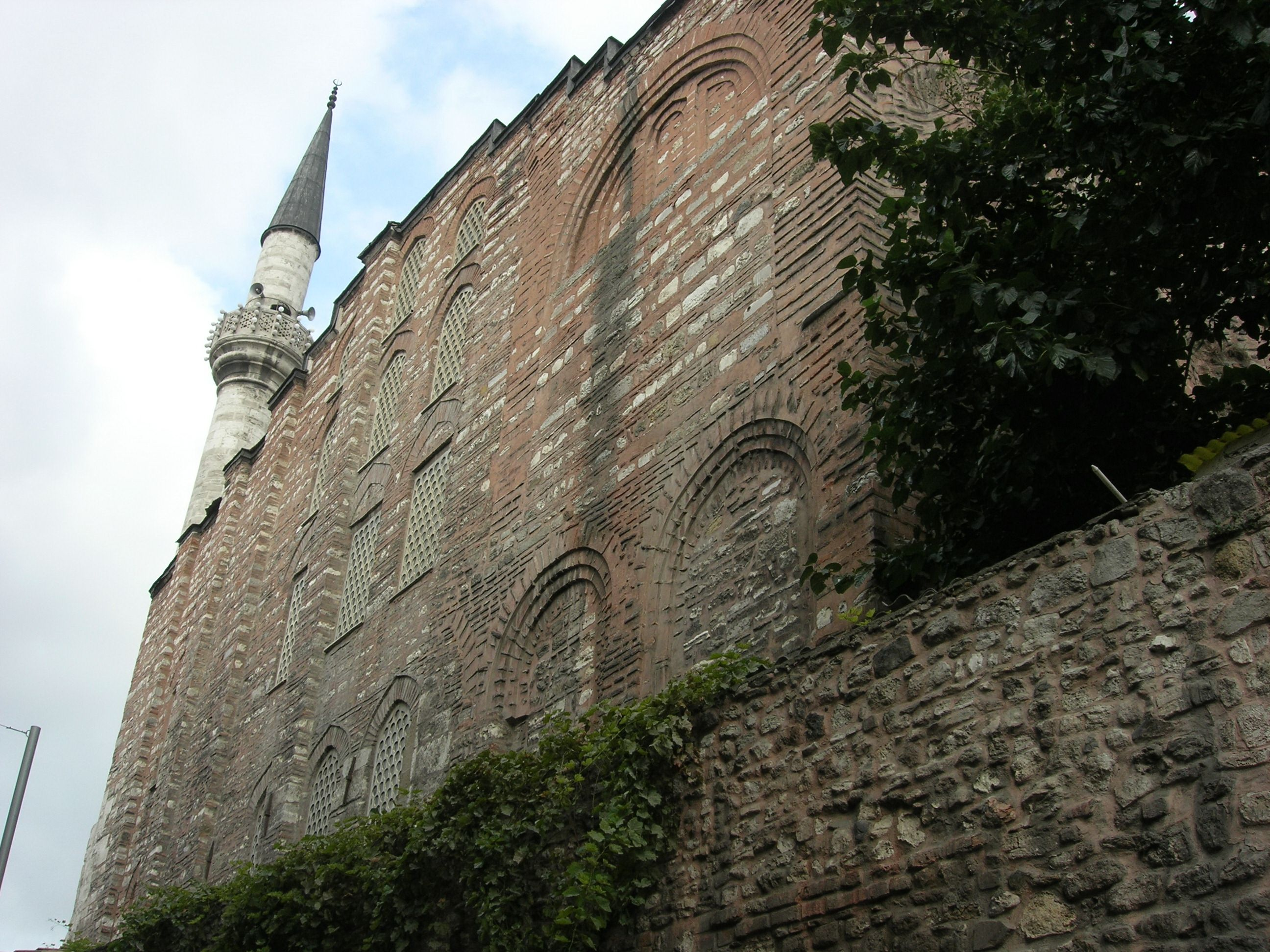
Gül Mosque viewed from the south, with its minaret at left

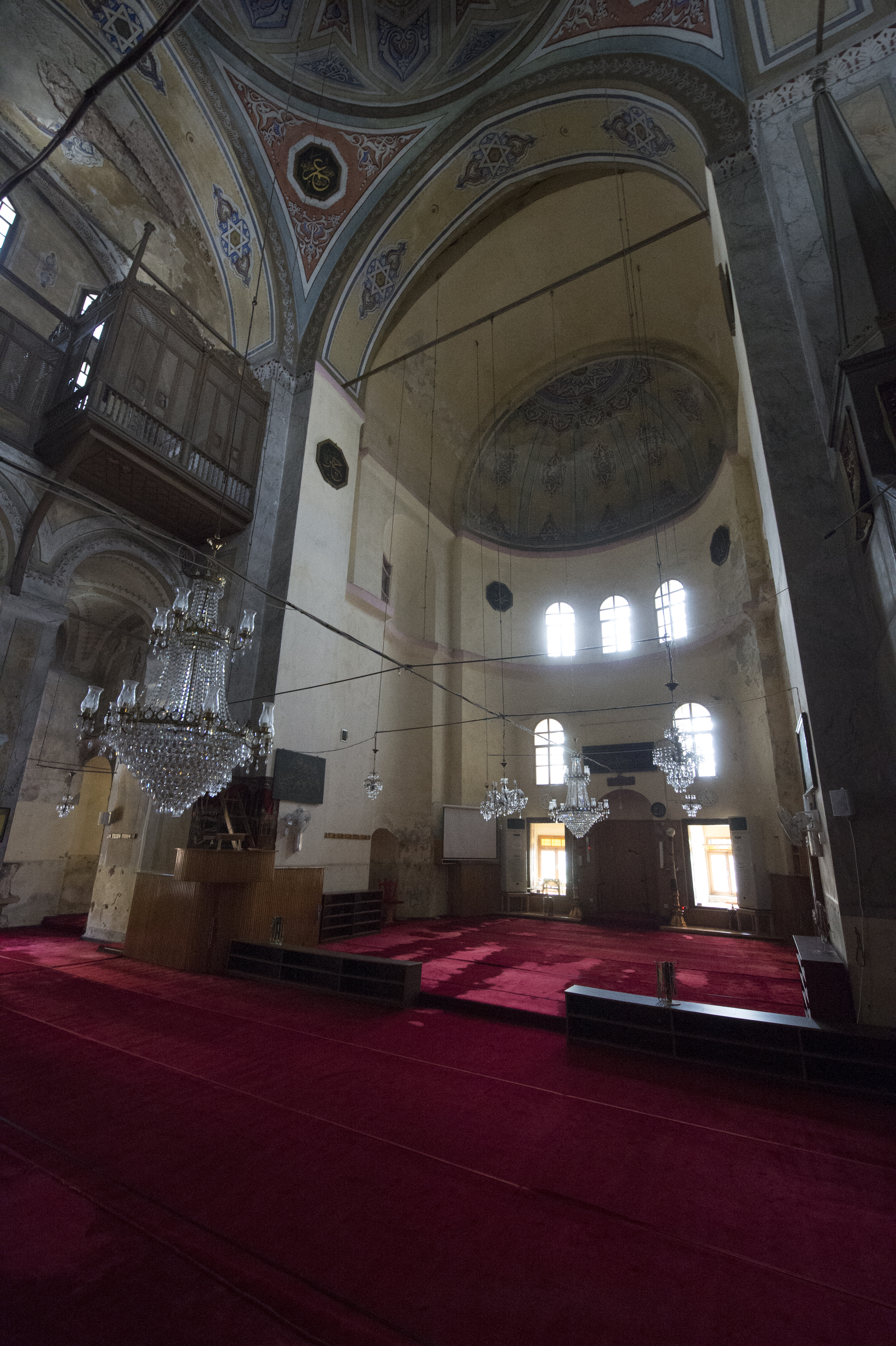
Gül Mosque interior

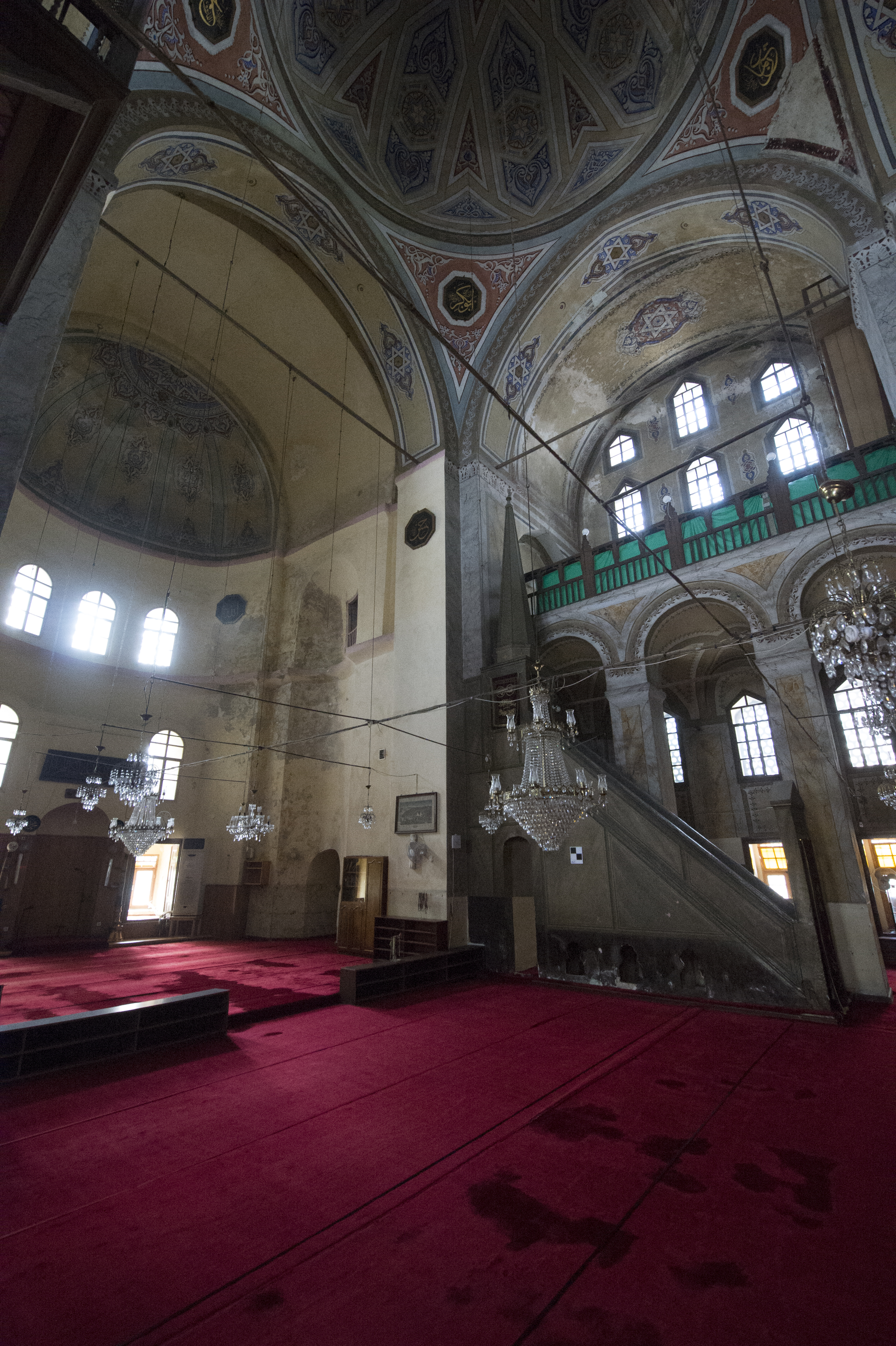
Gül Mosque interior

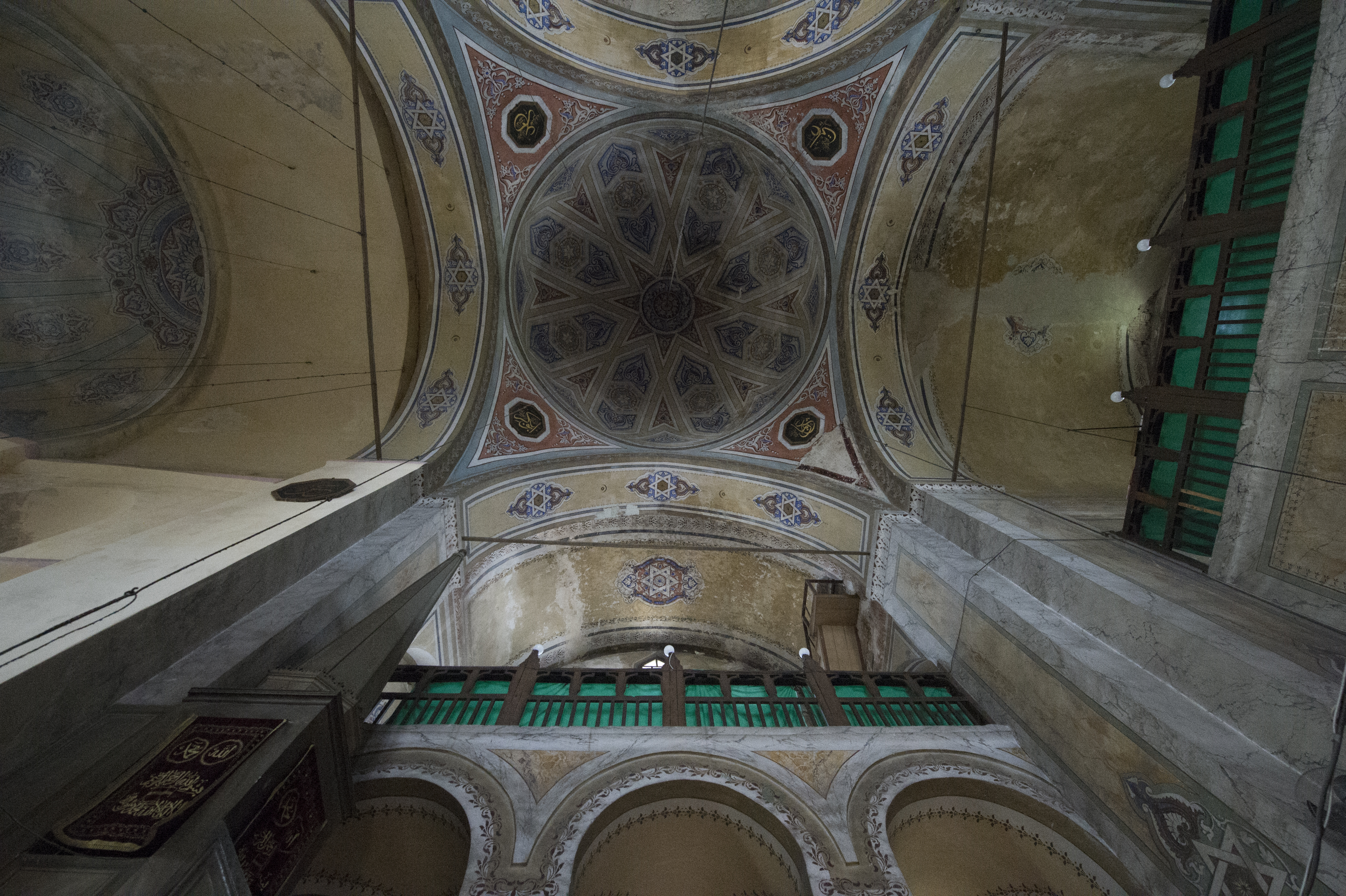
Dome of Gül Mosque

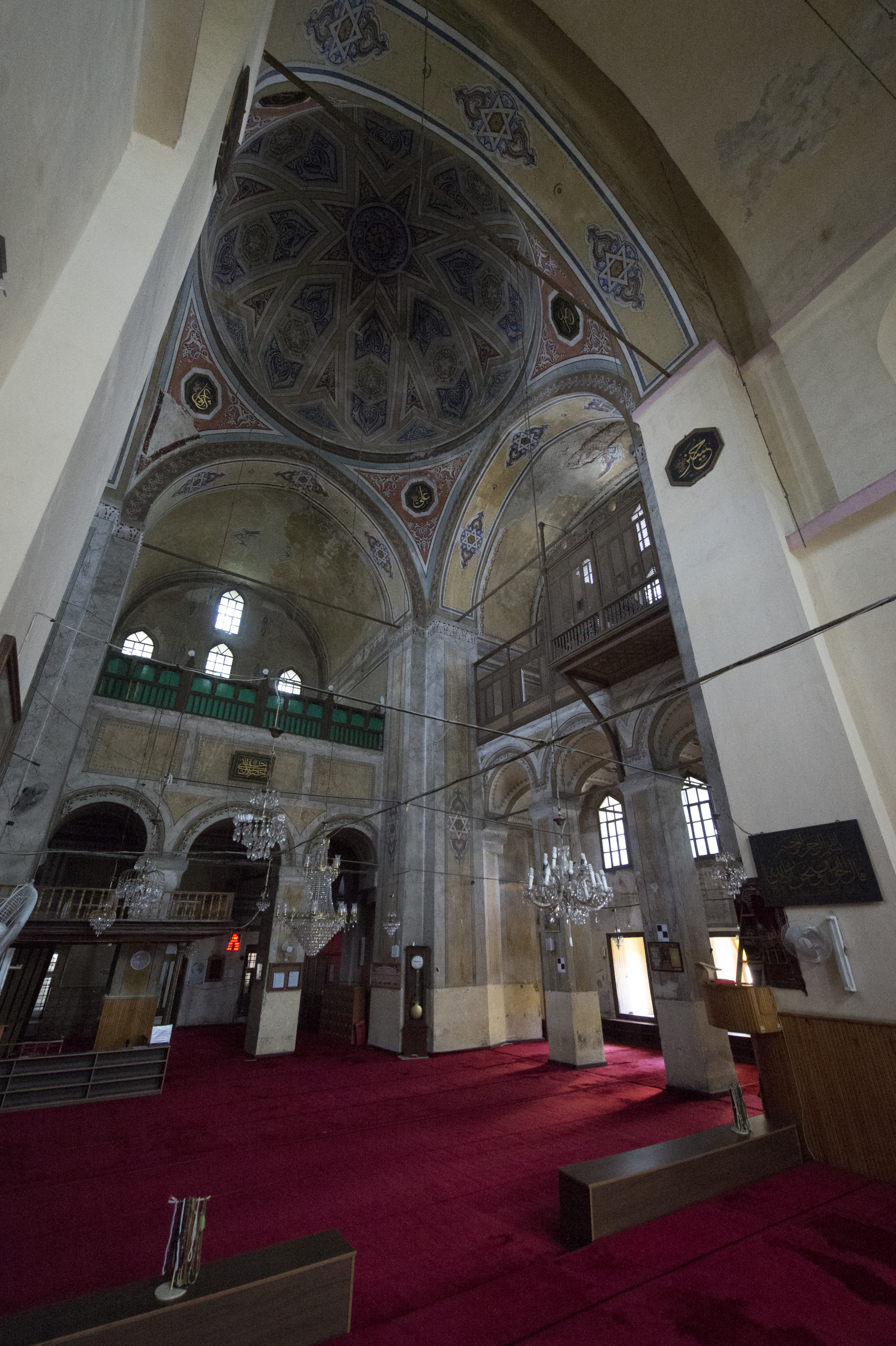
Gül Mosque interior

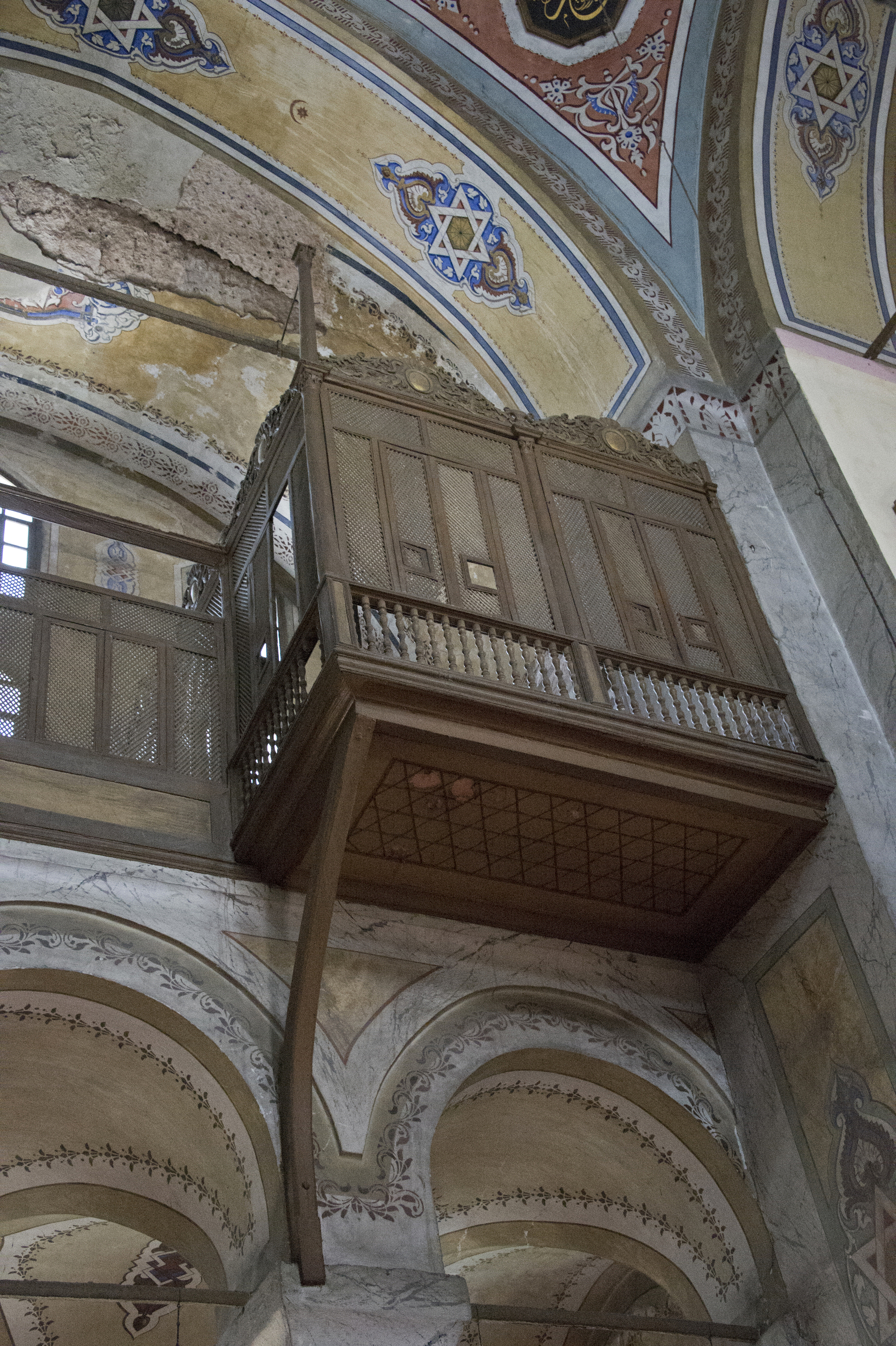
Gül Mosque gallery

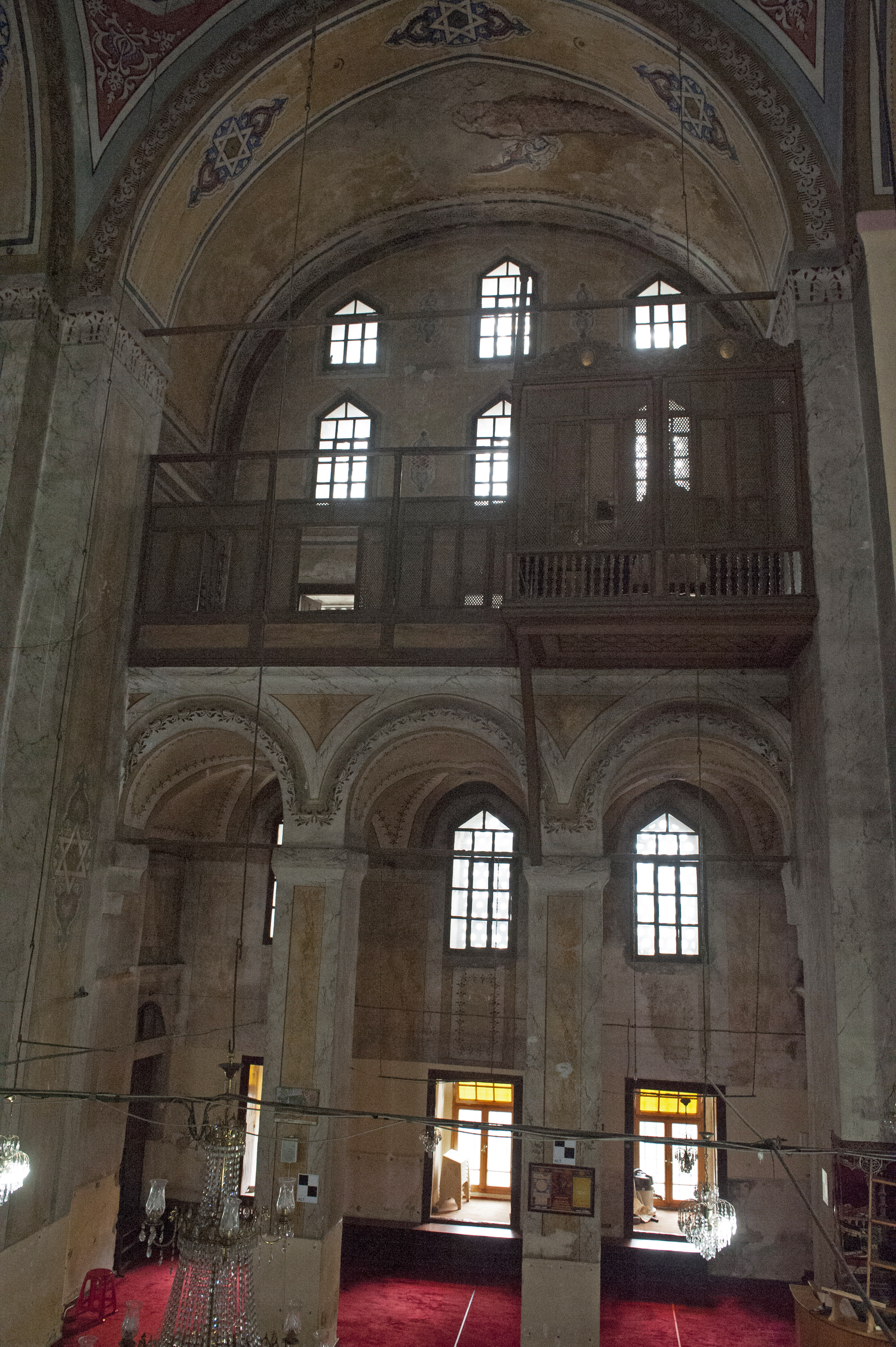
Gül Mosque north wall of interior

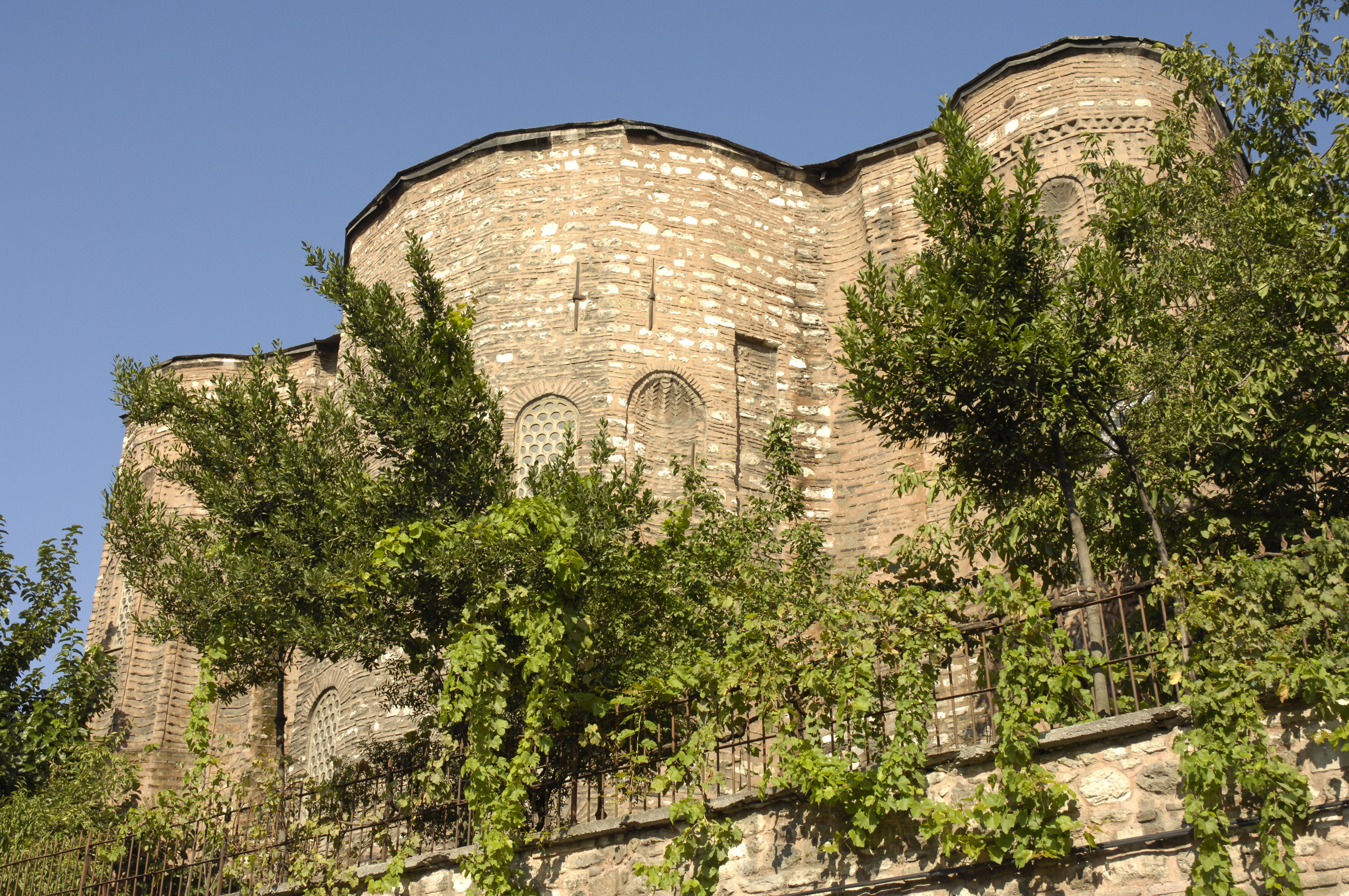
Side view of the Gül Mosque

== See also ==
- Ancient Roman and Byzantine domes

== Sources ==
- Van Millingen, Alexander (1912). Byzantine Churches of Constantinople. London: MacMillan & Co.
- Mamboury, Ernest (1953). The Tourists' Istanbul. Istanbul: Çituri Biraderler Basımevi.
- Janin, Raymond (1953). La Géographie Ecclésiastique de l'Empire Byzantin. 1. Part: Le Siège de Constantinople et le Patriarcat Oecuménique. 3rd Vol. : Les Églises et les Monastères (in French). Paris: Institut Français d'Etudes Byzantines.
- Schäfer, Hartmut (1973). Die Gül Camii in Istanbul (in German). Tübingen: Wasmuth. ISBN 978-3-8030-1706-2.
- Müller-Wiener, Wolfgang (1977). Bildlexikon zur Topographie Istanbuls: Byzantion, Konstantinupolis, Istanbul bis zum Beginn d. 17 Jh (in German). Tübingen: Wasmuth. ISBN 978-3-8030-1022-3.
- Krautheimer, Richard (1986). Architettura paleocristiana e bizantina (in Italian). Turin: Einaudi. ISBN 88-06-59261-0.
- Brubaker, Leslie; Haldon, John (2011). Byzantium in the Iconoclast era (ca 680-850). Cambridge: Cambridge University Press. ISBN 978-0-521-43093-7.
