= Gobrain =

Saint Gobrain
- Born: c. 630s
- Residence: Brittany, France
- Died: November 16, 725
- Venerated in: Roman Catholic Church; Eastern Orthodox Church; Anglican Communion
- Canonized: Pre-Congregation
- Feast: November 16

Saint Gobrain (c. 630s – November 16, 725) was a monk in Brittany. France and Bishop of Vannes. At the age of 87 he retired from his position to be a hermit. Gobrain died of natural causes in 725. His feast day is on November 16.

== See also ==
- Chronological list of saints in the 8th century
