= Reineldis =

Belgian saint

Saint Reineldis
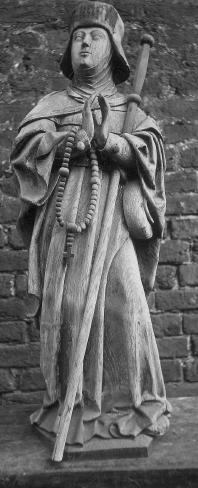
- Saint Reineldis as a pilgrim to the Holy Land, by the Master of Elsloo, circa 1530

Virgin and martyr
- Born: c. 630; Condacum
- Died: c. 680; Saintes, Brabant, Belgium
- Major shrine: Saintes, where her relics are kept
- Feast: 16 July
- Attributes: sword or pilgrim's staff
- Patronage: open wounds, against eye diseases

Reineldis (c. 630 – c. 680) was a saint of the 7th century, martyred by raiding barbarians.

== Life ==
Reineldis was born in a place called Condacum (which is identified with either Condé-sur-l'Escaut or Kontich). She was the daughter of Duke Witger of Lotharingia and Saint Amalberga of Maubeuge. Her brother Emebert was a priest in the diocese of Cambrai. Pharaildis, Gudula and Ermelinde were also her siblings. Her mother entered the religious life at Maubeuge Abbey.

Reineldis made a pilgrimage to the Holy Land. Her vita, written between 1048 and 1051 in Lobbes Abbey, records this fact, stating that she visited Jerusalem.

After returning home from the pilgrimage. Some sources say that she has built herself a cell in Saintes near Hal in Brabant in Belgium (other sources say at Xanten), and there she lived as a recluse. Other sources state that she devoted herself to a life of charitable work at Saintes.

When the Frisians or Huns invaded the country and all the people fled, she was left alone with the deacon Grimoald and her servant Gondulf. The crowd of wild heathens attacked them in the chapel, where the worshipers at the altar awaited death.

Reineldis was decapitated by at Saintes, together with deacon Grimoaldus and Gondulphus. The barbarians broke down the church doors, tore her away from the altar, to which she clung, dragged her through the church by her hair and beheaded her on 16 July, around the year 680.

== Veneration ==
Saint Reineldis is primarily venerated in Saintes as the patron saint of the town. Some sources even indicate that Saintes owes its name to Reineldis' martyrdom. Her reliquary is in Hal.

The parish church of Saintes is dedicated to Sainte-Renelde since the Middle Ages and has preserved the relics of Saint Reineldis. This church has a large bell tower built in the 16th century.

Saint Reineldis' patronage for eye diseases is due to the association with a well in Saintes known as "Sainte Renelde's well", which is believed to cure eye diseases.

== Iconography ==
Reineldis is commonly depicted with a sword or being dragged by her hair, referring to the decapitation. She is also portrayed as a pilgrim, because of her journey to the Holy Land.

== Gallery ==
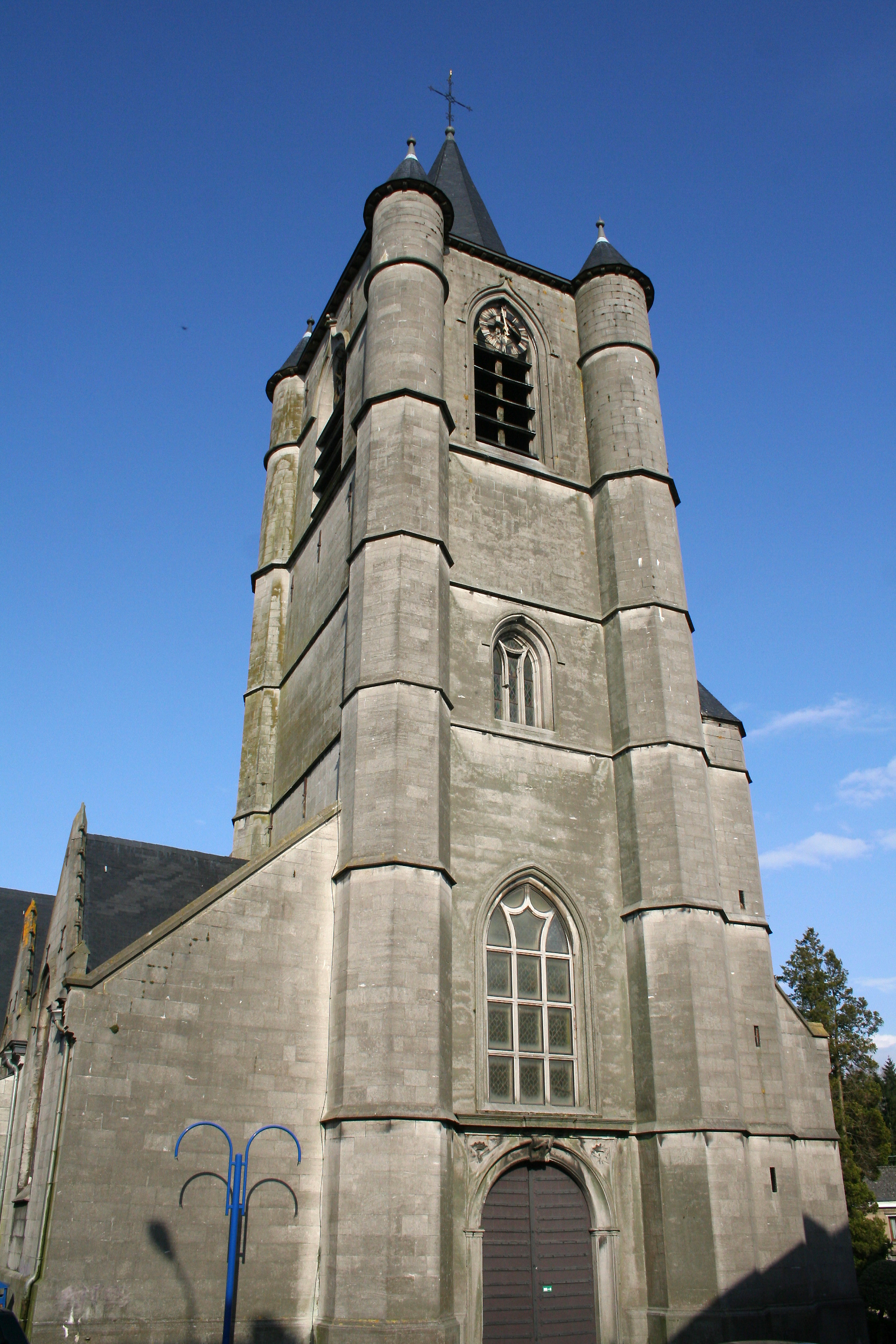
The Saint Reineldis church (1553) in Saintes

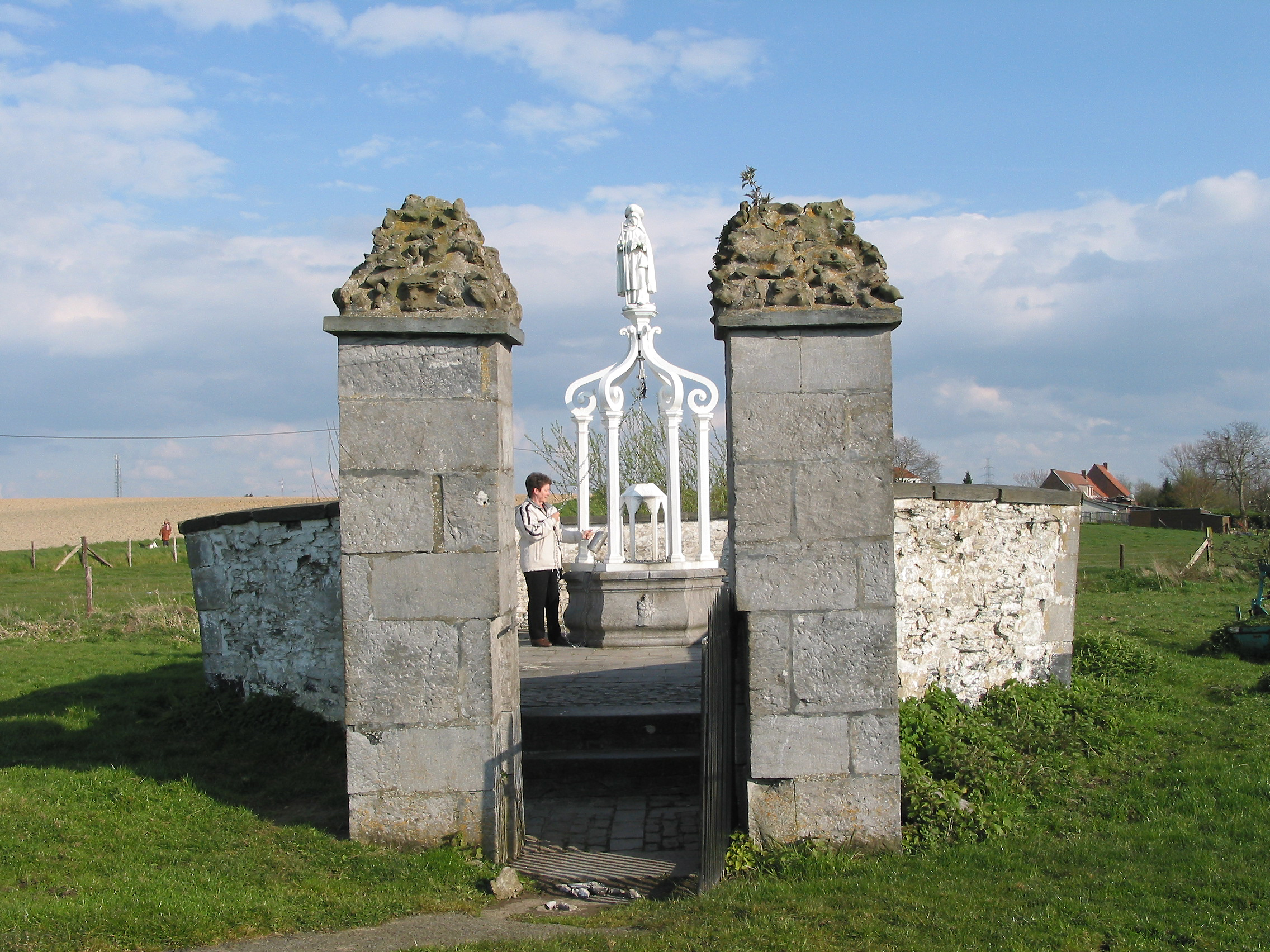
The Saint Reineldis fountain (1861) in Saintes
