= Amalberga of Maubeuge =

Merovingian nun and saint

Saint Amalberga of Maubeuge
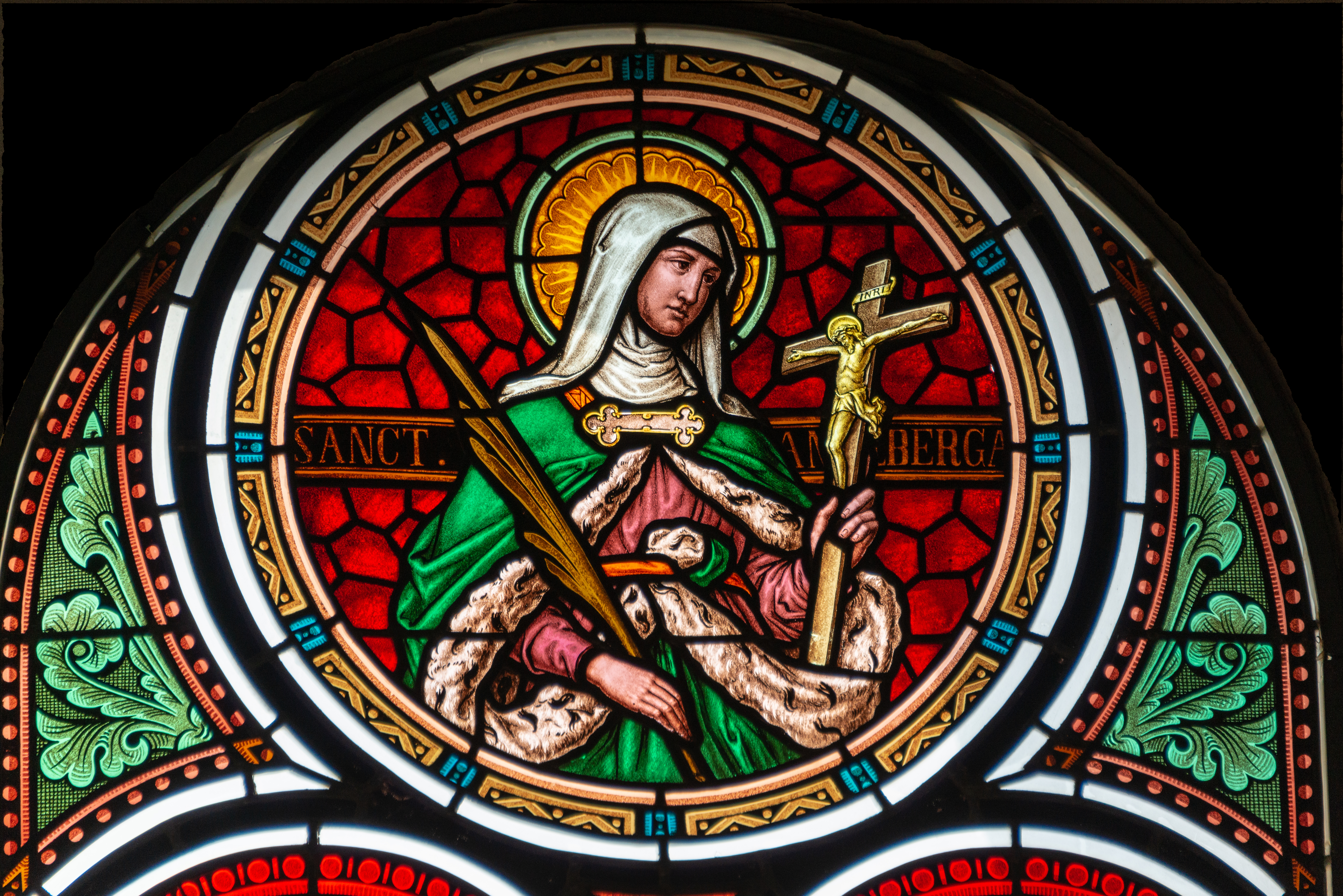
- Born: 7th century Brabant, Belgium
- Died: c. 690
- Venerated in: Roman Catholic Church; Eastern Orthodox Church
- Major shrine: Binche, Belgium
- Feast: 10 July
- Attributes: holding an open book and with a crown on her head
- Patronage: arm pain, bruises, and fever

Saint Amalberga of Maubeuge (also Amalia, or Amelia of Lobbes or Binche) was a Merovingian nun and saint who lived in the 7th century.

== Legend ==
Amalberga's father was Saint Geremarus. She was born in Brabant. She is said to have been the niece of Pepin of Landen who married her against her will to a great lord, named Thierry, by whom she had a daughter, afterwards St. Pharailda.

Upon the death of her first husband, Pepin had her marry Count Witger, Duke of Lorraine. In her biography she is presented as the mother of five saints: Pharaildis, Emebert, Reineldis, Ermelindis and Gudula.

Sometime after the birth of their youngest child, Gudula, Witger decided to become a Benedictine in Lobbes; Amalberga joined the Benedictine nuns of Maubeuge.

Her feast is celebrated on July 10. The translation of her relics from Lobbes to Binche in the 15th century is celebrated on June 10.

Amalberga of Maubeuge is not to be confused with the virgin Amalberga of Temse (venerated in Ghent, Temse and Munsterbilzen) who died in 772, and whose feast day is July 10 or October 27.

== History ==
The biography of Amalberga of Maubeuge (Vita sancti Amalbergae viduae) is probably written by Abbott Hugo of Lobbes (1033–1063) between 1033 and 1048. Apart from a few Merovingian details, her genealogy was copied from another 11th-century hagiography, namely the Passio sancti Katharinae. The biographical profile of her legendary husband, duke Witger of Lotharingia, is based on an historical figure from the 10th century, Wigeric of Lotharingia. It is largely considered legendary and unreliable.

== Feast days ==
- 20 June - translation of relics from Lobbes to Binche
- 2 July - translation of relics from Lobbes to Binche
- 10 July - main commemoration

== See also ==
- Amelberga of Susteren
- Amalberga of Temse

== Literature ==
- Van Droogenbroeck, F. J., 'Hugo van Lobbes (1033-1053), auteur van de Vita Amalbergae viduae, Vita S. Reinildis en Vita S. Berlendis', Eigen Schoon en De Brabander 94 (2011) 367-402.
- Van Droogenbroeck, F. J., 'Kritisch onderzoek naar de interacties tussen de Vita S. Gudilae en de Gesta Episcoporum Cameracensium.', Eigen Schoon en De Brabander 95 (2012) 311-346.
