= Saintes, Belgium =

Section of Tubize, Wallonia

Saintes
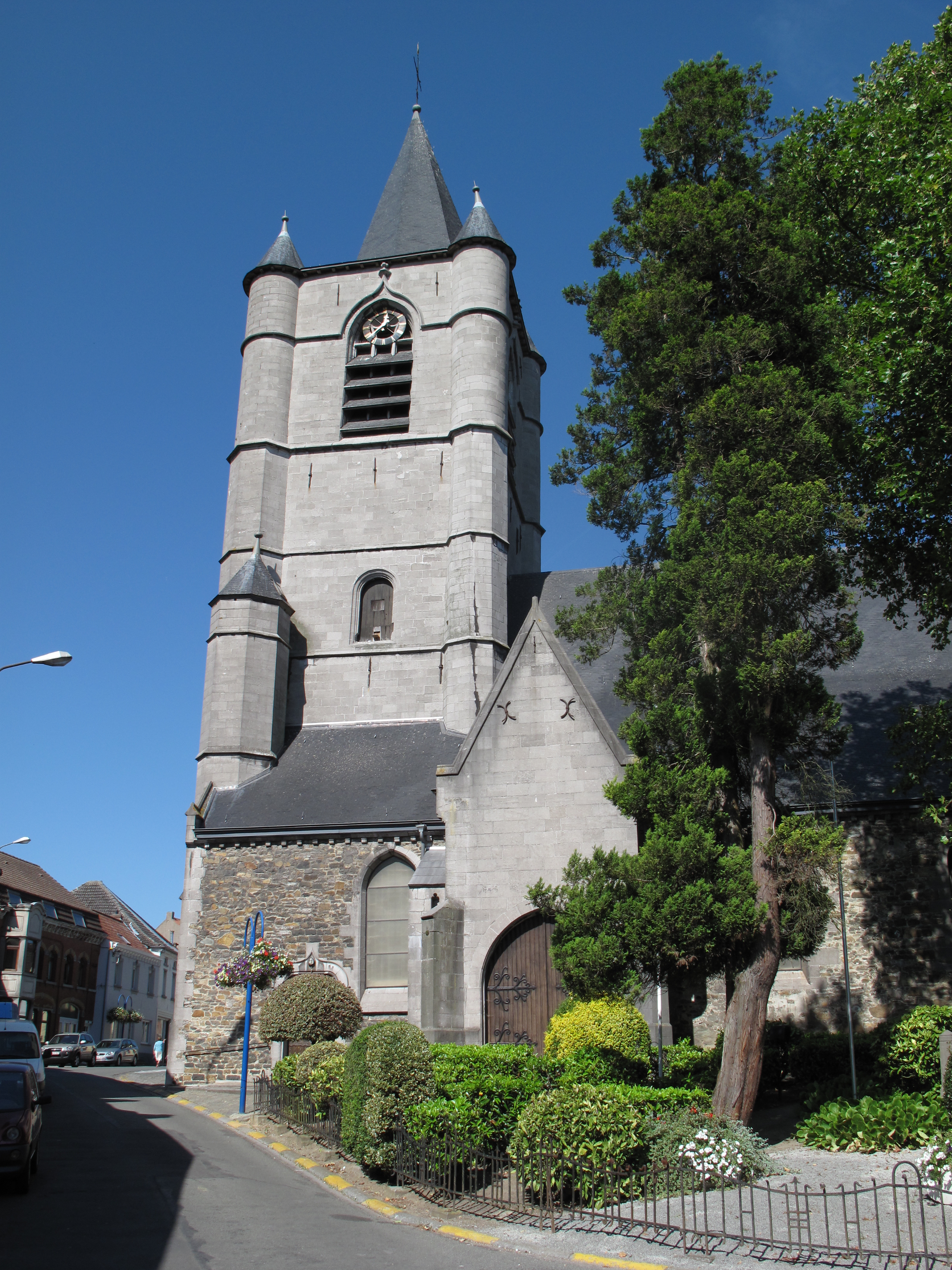
- Church of Saint Reineldis, Saintes (16th century)

- Location within Belgium Location within Europe
- Coordinates: 50°42′14″N 04°09′38″E
- Country: Belgium
- Region: Wallonia
- Province: Walloon Brabant
- Municipality: Tubize

Saintes is a village and a district in the municipality of Tubize, in Walloon Brabant, Wallonia, Belgium.

The history of the village is closely linked to the legend of Saint Reineldis, a locally venerated saint from the 7th century. During the Middle Ages, Lobbes Abbey had large holdings in the area. The village retained its rural character until the end of the 20th century, after which it has developed into a popular residency for commuters working in Brussels.

The village church is a late Gothic edifice, dating from the middle of the 16th century (the tower was erected in 1553), incorporating remains of an earlier, Romanesque church in the chancel walls. It contains several historical furnishings, and a chapel dedicated to Saint Reineldis. In the village there is also a sacred well, dedicated to the saint.
