= Ayakapı =

- Quarter
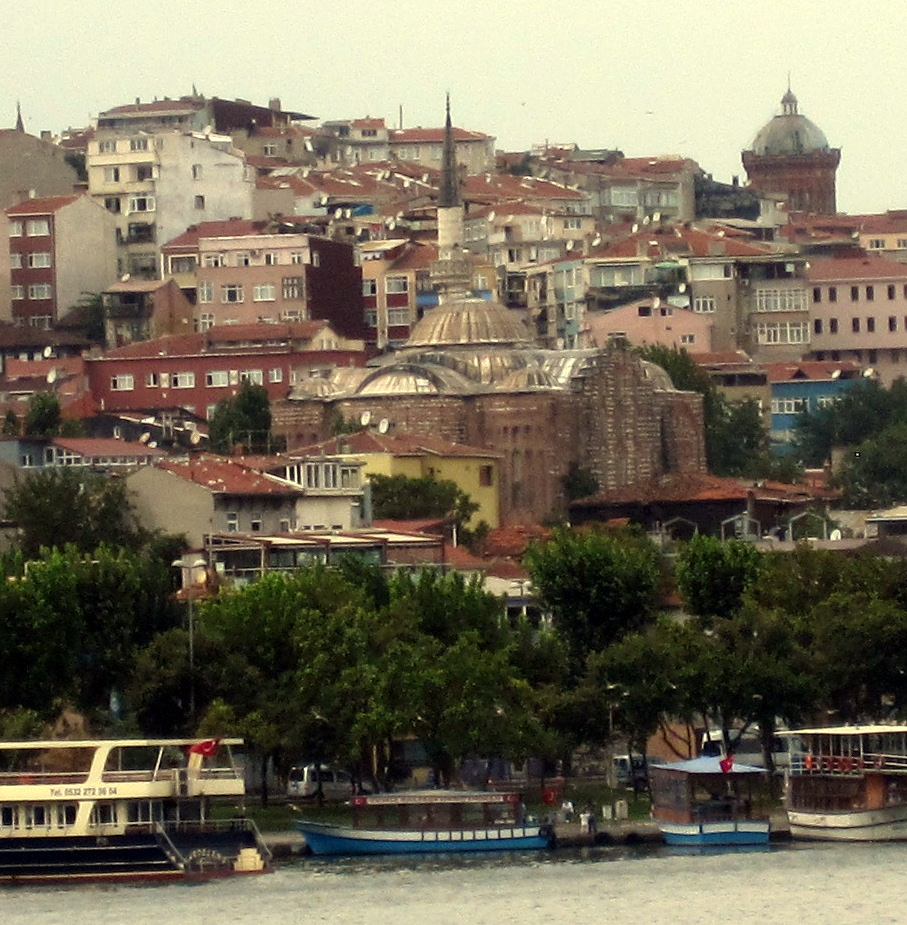
- Ayakapı (with the Gül Mosque in the center) seen from Atatürk Bridge on the Golden Horn.

- Location within Istanbul Fatih
- Coordinates: 41°01′36.00″N 28°57′23.40″E
- Country: Turkey
- Region: Marmara
- Province: Istanbul
- District: Fatih
- Time zone: UTC+3 (TRT)
- Area code: 0212

Ayakapı (Turkish: "The Gate of the Saint", "The holy gate") (the toponym comes from the Turkish word Aya, derived from pronunciation of the Greek word ἁγἰα, meaning "female Saint" and the Turkish word kapı, meaning "gate") is a quarter of Istanbul, Turkey. It is part of the district of Fatih, inside the walled city, and lies on the shore of the Golden Horn. During the Byzantine era, it was named ta Dexiokratiana or ta Dexiokratous in Greek, after the houses owned here by a certain Dexiokrates. Its modern name comes from a church dedicated to Saint Theodosia which, according to Petrus Gillius, stood near the gate. In Ayakapı lies one of the most important surviving Byzantine buildings of the historical peninsula, the Gül Mosque.
Moreover, in 1582 the Ottoman architect Sinan built here the Ayakapı Hamamı (bathhouse). This structure is currently used as a storage for timber.

== Gallery ==
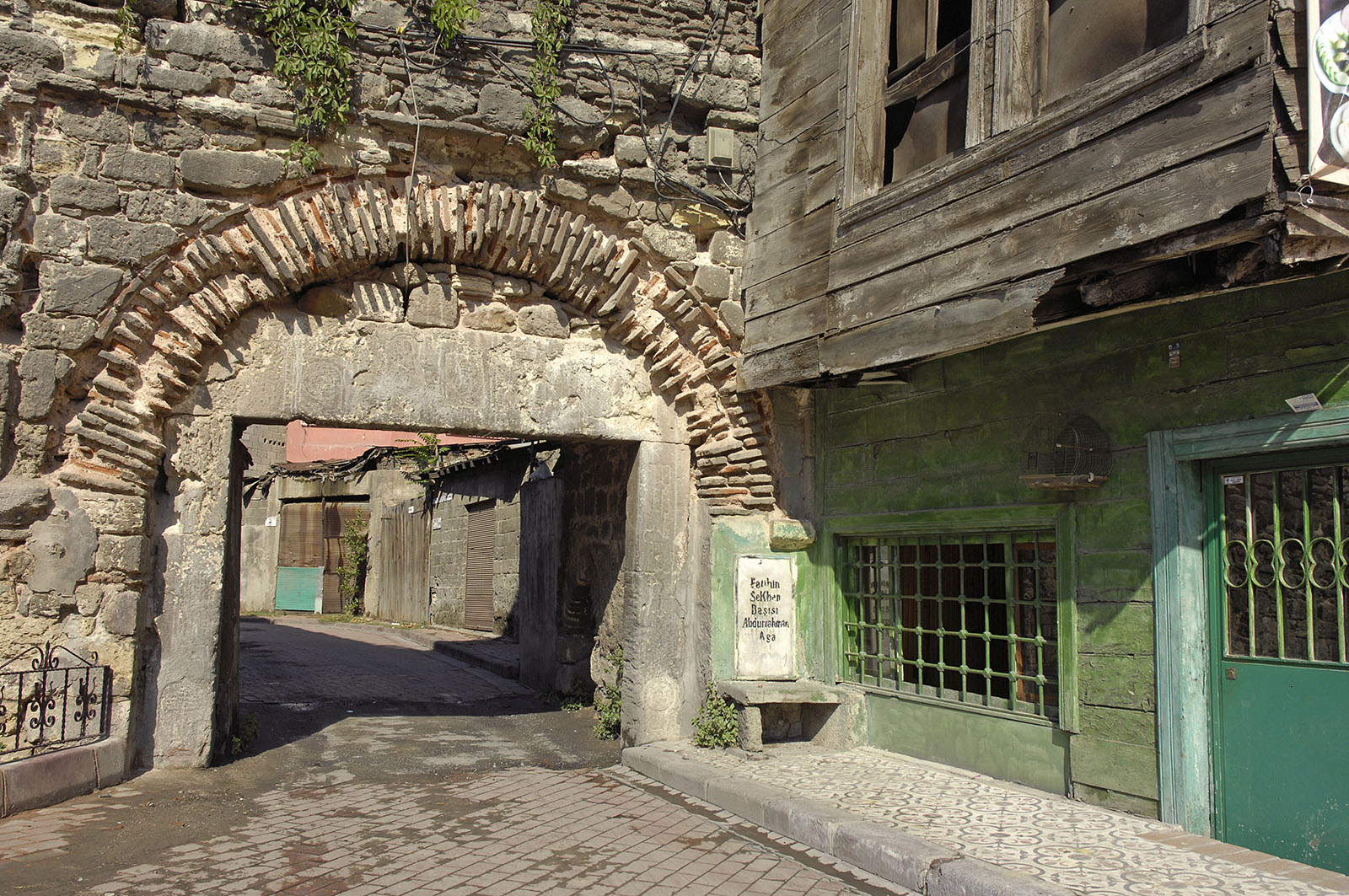
Holy Gate or Ayakapı

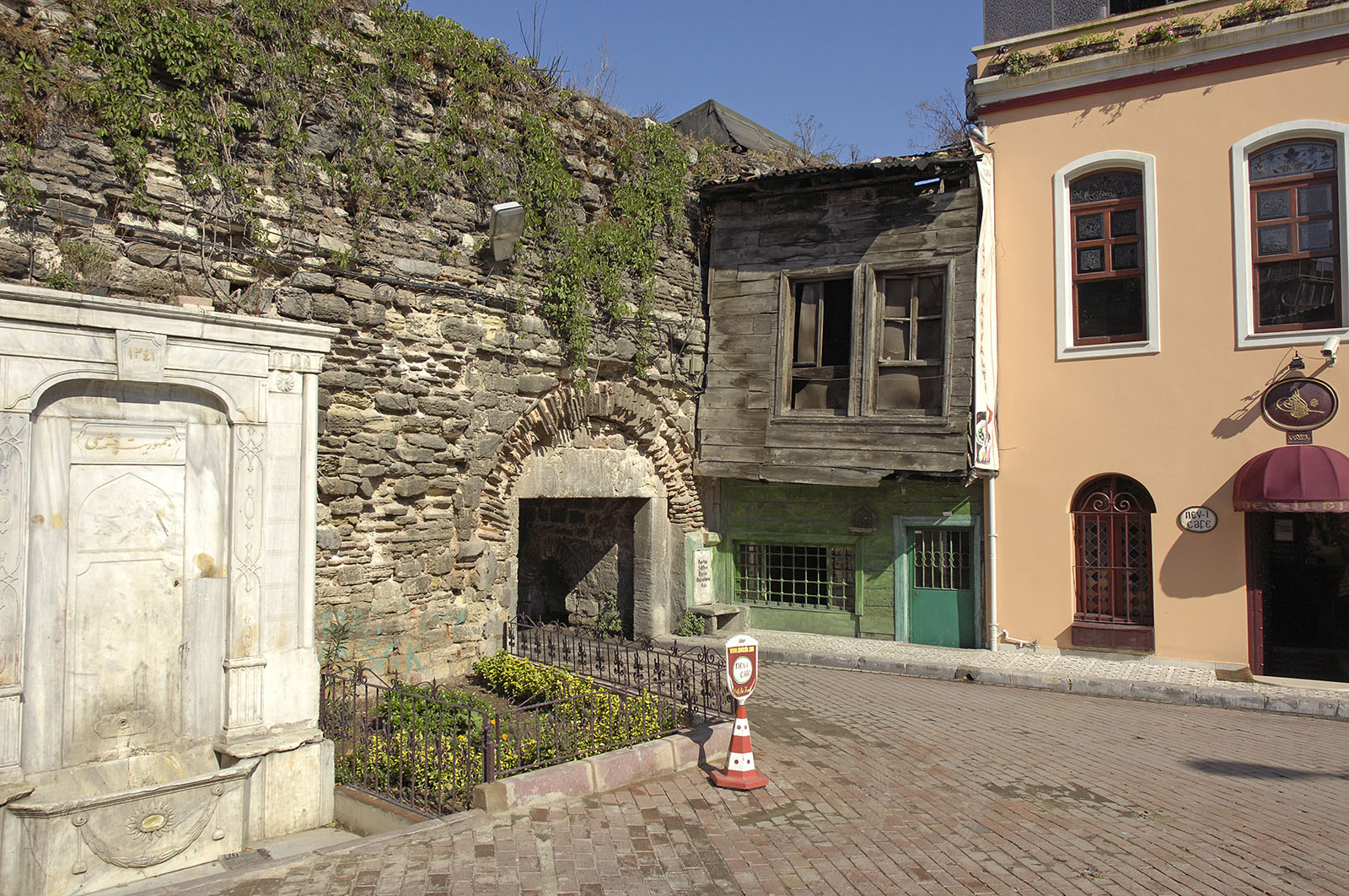
Holy Gate or Ayakapı

== Sources ==
- Janin, Raymond (1964). Constantinople Byzantine (2 ed.). Paris: Institut français 'etudes byzantines.
