= Gudula =

7th and 8th-century medieval saint from Brabant

Saint Gudula of Brabant
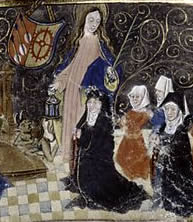
- From New York Public Library, MA 092, fol. 251, Haarlem Gradual of 1494, depiction of Saint Gudula bearing a lantern which the demon endeavors to extinguish
- Born: c. 646; Pagus of Brabant
- Died: 680–714; Hamme, Francia
- Venerated in: Roman Catholic Church; Eastern Orthodox Church
- Major shrine: Eibingen; St. Michael and Gudula Cathedral
- Feast: 8 January, 19 January in the Diocese of Ghent
- Attributes: depicted as a woman with lantern which the devil tries to blow out
- Patronage: Brussels, single, laywomen

Gudula of Brabant, also known as Saint Gudula (ca. 646–712), was a Christian saint who is venerated in Catholic and Orthodox churches. In Brabant, she is usually called Goedele or Goule; (Latin: Gudila, later Gudula; Dutch: Goedele; French: Gudule). Her name is connected to several places: Moorsel (where she lived), Brussels (where a chapter in her honour was founded in 1047) and Eibingen (where the relic of her skull is conserved).

== Life ==
Gudula was born around 646 in the pagus of Brabant (in present-day Belgium). According to her 11th-century biography (Vita Gudilae), written by Onulfus of Hautmont, a monk of Hautmont Abbey between 1048 and 1051, she was the daughter of a duke of Lotharingia called Witger and Saint Amalberga. Her mother embraced the religious life in Maubeuge Abbey. Gudula had three sisters, Saint Pharaildis, Saint Reineldis and Saint Ermelinde, and one brother, Saint Emebertus. She received the veil from the hands of Saint Aubert, Bishop of Cambrai (d. about 668).

Gudula was educated in Nivelles Abbey by her godmother, Gertrude of Nivelles. When Gertrude died, Gudula moved back to her home at Moorsel, spending her time in good works and religious devotion. She was profuse in her alms for the poor, and frequently visited the church of Moorsel, situated about two miles from her parents' house. Nothing particular is recorded of Gudula beyond the singular holiness of her life.

Gudula died between 680 and 714, with the most frequent date mentioned being 712, and was buried at Hamme (East Flanders). Later, her relics were removed to a St. Salvator near Moorsel, where the body was interred behind the altar. During the reign of Charles, Duke of Lower Lorraine (977–992), they were transferred to Saint Gaugericus' chapel in Brussels. Lambert II, Count of Leuven, (d. 1054) founded a chapter in 1047 in honour of Saint Gudula. Bishop Gerardus I of Cambrai (d. 1051) led the translation of her relics to the church of Saint Michael in Brussels. The church later became the famous Cathedral of St. Michael and St. Gudula.

On 6 June 1579, the collegiate church was pillaged and wrecked by Protestant Geuzen ("Beggars"), and Saint Gudula's relics were disinterred and scattered.

== Veneration ==
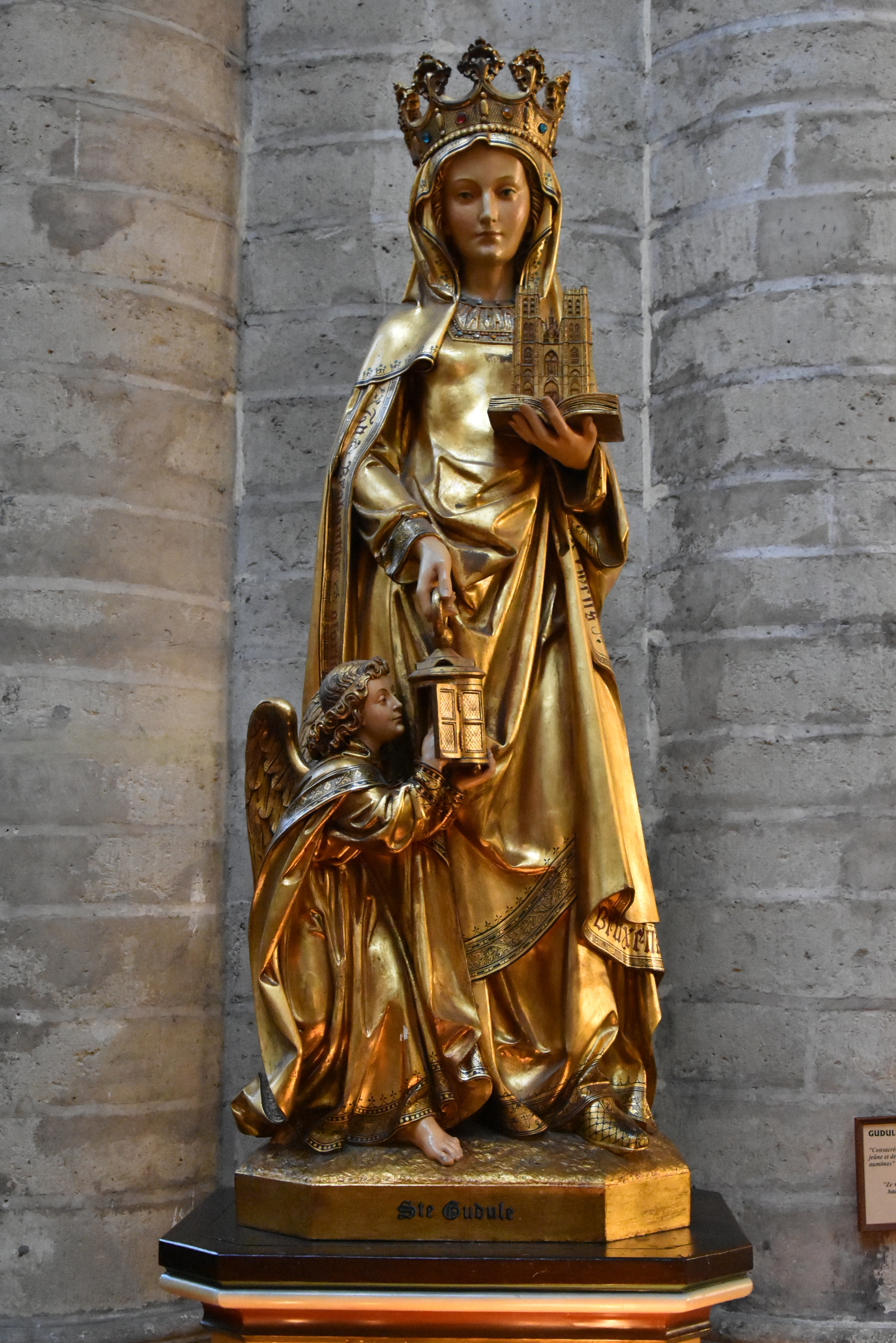
Statue of Saint Gudula in the Cathedral of St. Michael and St. Gudula, Brussels

Along with Saint Michael, Gudula is a patron saint of Brussels. Her feast is generally celebrated on 8 January (the day she died according to her hagiography). However, in the diocese of Ghent (where Moorsel is situated), her feast is held on 19 January. Charlemagne also made donations to the convent of Moorsel in her honour.

Saint Gudula's skull is conserved in the Catholic Church of St. Hildegard in Eibingen, Germany.

== Iconography ==
Saint Gudula is often depicted holding a lantern or taper, but this originates probably out of confusion with the Paris Saint Genevieve tradition. She is depicted on a seal of the Church of St. Gudula of 1446 holding in her right hand a candle, and in her left a lamp, which a demon tries to extinguish. This refers to the legend that the saint went to church before cock-crow. The demon, wishing to stray her off the right way, extinguished the candle, but the saint obtained from God that her lantern should be rekindled.

The flower called tremella deliquescens, which bears fruit in the beginning of January, is known as Sinte Goedele's lampken (St. Gudula's lantern).

== See also ==
- Saint Gudula, patron saint archive

== Sources ==
=== Primary sources ===
- Vita prima sanctae Gudilae auctore anonymo on the Latin Wikisource
- Vita ampliata sanctae Gudilae auctore Huberto on the Latin Wikisource

=== Secondary sources ===
- Bollandus J., Henschenius G., De S. Gudila Virgine Bruxellis in Belgio, Acta Sanctorum Januarii I (1643) 524–530.
- Bonenfant, P., 'La charte de foundation du chapitre de Sainte-Gudule à Bruxelles', Bulletin de la Commission Royale d'Histoire 115 (1950) 17–58.
- Podevijn, R., 'Hubert, l'auteur de la vita Gudulae', Revue Belge de Philologie et d'Histoire 15 (1936) 489–496.
- Podevijn, 'Etude critique sur la Vita Gudulae', Revue Belge de Philologie et d'Histoire 2 (1923) 619–641.
- Lefèvre, P., 'Une conjecture à propos de la date et de l'auteur du "Vita Gudile"', Belgisch Tijdschrift voor Filologie en Geschiedenis 14/1 (Brussel 1935) 98–101.
- van der Essen, L., 'Etude critique et littéraire sur les vitae des saints Mérovingiens', Recueil de travaux publiées par les membres des conférences d'histoire et de philologie 17 (Leuven 1907) 296–311.
- Riethe, P., 'Der Schädel der heiligen Gudula aus der Pfarrkirche von Eibingen. Eine historisch-anthropologische Studie', Nassauische Annalen Jahrbuch des Vereins für nassauische Altertumskunde und Geschichtsforschung Band 67 (1956) 233.
- Van Droogenbroeck, F. J., 'Onulfus van Hautmont (ca. 1048), auteur van de Vita S. Gudilae anonymo', Eigen Schoon en De Brabander 95 (2012) 595–643.
- Van Droogenbroeck, F. J., Nova miracula de exemplis veteribus (2016)
