= Theodosia of Constantinople =

Saint Theodosia of Constantinople
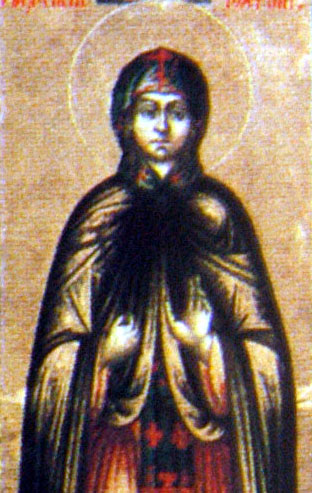
- Icon of Saint Theodosia

Virgin Martyr
- Born: Constantinople, Byzantine Empire (modern-day Istanbul, Turkey)
- Died: 19 January 729; Constantinople, Byzantine Empire
- Venerated in: Eastern Orthodox Church; Eastern Catholic Churches; Roman Catholic Church
- Canonized: Pre-Congregation
- Feast: 29 May (Eastern Orthodox); 18 July (Roman Catholic)
- Attributes: Martyr’s cross, monastic habit, icon of Christ Pantocrator
- Patronage: the infirm

Saint Theodosia of Constantinople (Greek: Ἁγία Θεοδοσία ἡ Κωνσταντινουπολίτισσα, romanized: Hagia Theodosia hē Kōnstantinoupolitissa) was a Christian nun and martyr who lived through and opposed the Byzantine Iconoclasm of the seventh and eight centuries.

== Life ==
According to a biography published by the Orthodox Church in America, Theodosia "was born in answer to the fervent prayers of her parents." When they died, she was sent to be raised at the women's Monastery of Holy Martyr Anastasia in Constantinople. She "distributed to the poor of what remained of her parental inheritance" after which she became a nun.

== Martyrdom ==
On January 19, 729, at the beginning of the iconoclastic persecutions, the Emperor Leo III the Isaurian demanded that an icon of Christ which stood over the grand Chalke Gate of the imperial palace be removed. Anastasius of Constantinople ordered that the church comply.

While an officer was executing the order, a group of women gathered to prevent the operation. Among them was Theodosia, who shook the ladder strongly until the officer fell from it. The man died from his injuries, and Theodosia was arrested and brought to the Forum Bovis. There, she was executed by having a ram's horn hammered through her neck.

== Veneration ==
Following the Triumph of Orthodoxy over iconoclasm, she was recognized as a martyr and saint, and her body was kept and venerated in the church of Hagia Euphemia en to Petrio, in the quarter named Dexiokratianai, named after the houses owned here by one Dexiokrates. After the beginning of the fourteenth century, the church was renamed for her, and may correspond to the mosque of Gül. A gate in the sea walls of Constantinople, the Gate of Hagia Theodosia (Turkish: Ayakapı) was named after her church. It corresponds to the modern neighborhood of Ayakapı, along the Golden Horn.

Theodosia became one among the most venerated saints in Constantinople. She is invoked particularly by the infirm, her fame increased by the miraculous recovery of a deaf-mute in 1306.

The Roman Catholic Church celebrates her memorial on its original date of 18 July, while the Eastern Orthodox Church and Eastern Catholic Churches transferred her commemoration to 29 May.

== Notes ==
- Van Millingen, Alexander (1912). Byzantine Churches of Constantinople. London: MacMillan & Co.
- Mamboury, Ernest (1953). The Tourists' Istanbul. Istanbul: Çituri Biraderler Basımevi.
- Janin, Raymond (1953). La Géographie ecclésiastique de l'Empire byzantin. 1. Part: Le Siège de Constantinople et le patriarcat oecuménique. 3rd Vol. : Les Églises et les monastères. Paris: Institut français d'etudes byzantines.
- Schäfer, Hartmut (1973). Die Gül Camii in Istanbul. Tübingen: Wasmuth.
- Brubaker, Leslie; Haldon, John (2011). Byzantium in the Iconoclast era (ca 680-850). Cambridge: Cambridge University Press. ISBN 978-0-521-43093-7.
