= Libert of Saint-Trond =

Saint Libert of Saint-Trond
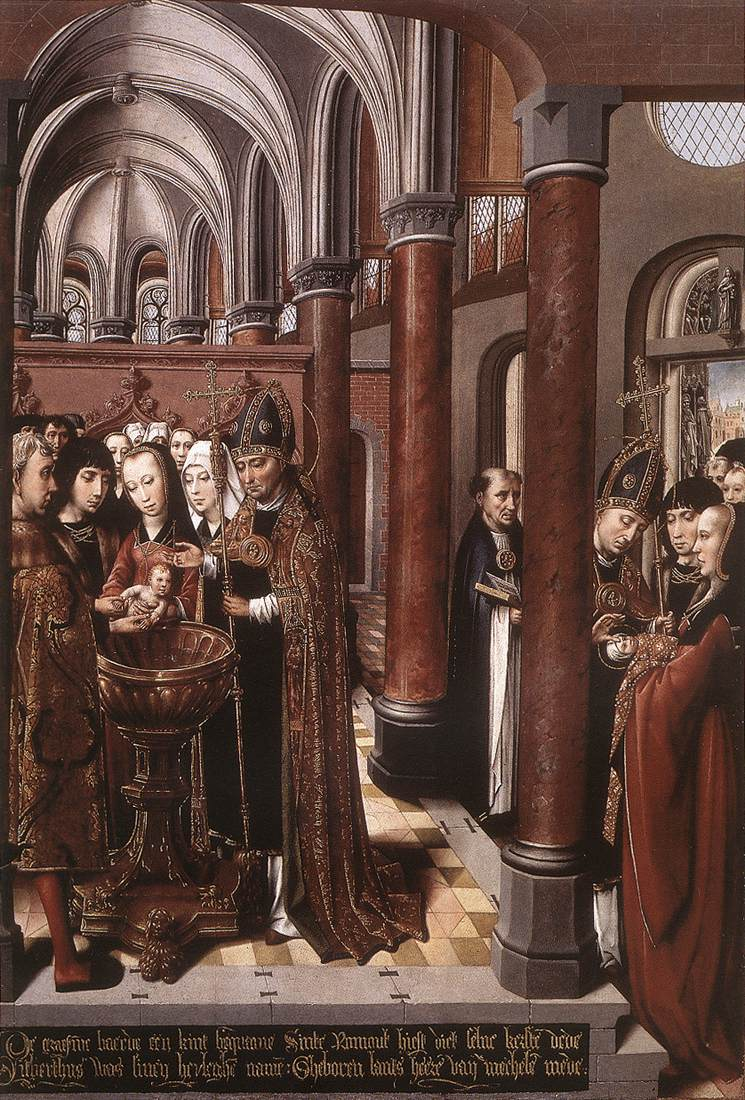
- Baptism of St Libertus (1490)
- Born: Mechelen
- Died: 783
- Venerated in: Russian Orthodox Church
- Feast: 14 July

Libert (Lisbert, Libertus) of Sint-Truiden (died 783) was a Belgian saint. Born as Count Libert of Adone in Mechelen, he was baptized and educated by Saint Rumoldus. Libert became a Benedictine monk.

He became a monk at the abbey of Sint-Truiden. He was killed by barbarians. His feast day is July 14.
