= Epiphania (Bithynia) =

Epiphania or Epiphaneia (Ancient Greek: Ἐπιφανεία) was a city in Bithynia in Anatolia mentioned by Stephanus of Byzantium.

Its site is unlocated.
