= Pharaildis =

Belgian virgin and patron saint of Ghent

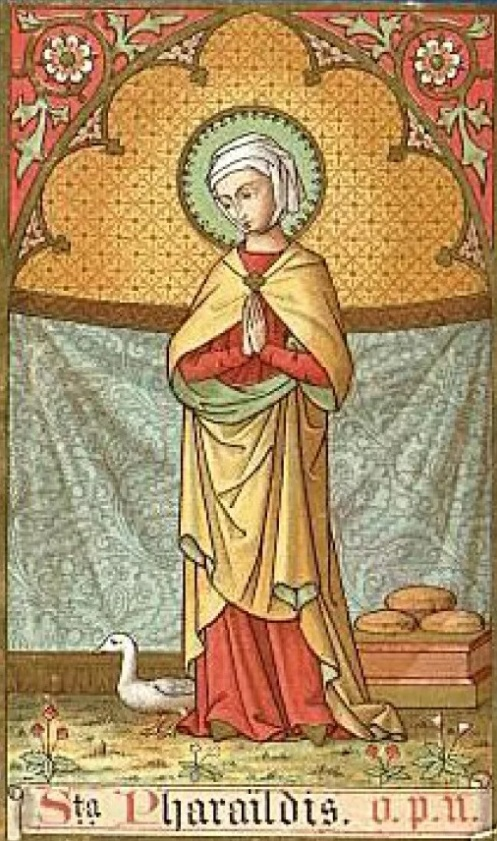

Virgin
- Born: Ghent, Belgium
- Feast: 4 January
- Attributes: shown with a goose at her feet
- Patronage: Bruay, France; childhood diseases; difficult marriages; Ghent, Belgium; victims of abuse; widows

Saint Pharaildis or Pharailde (Dutch: Veerle) is an 8th-century Belgian virgin and patron saint of Ghent. Her dates are imprecise, but she lived to a great age and died on January 5 at ninety.

== Life ==
Pharaildis was born in Ghent, the daughter of Witger, Duke of Lorraine and his wife Amalberga of Maubeuge. Her siblings were: Emebert, Reineldis, Ermelindis and Gudula. Pharaildis was brought up by Gertrude of Nivelles.

Pharaildis was married against her will at a young age with a nobleman, even after having made a private vow of virginity. Her husband insisted that she was married to him, and her sexual fidelity was owed to him, not God. She was therefore physically abused for her refusal to submit to him, and for her late night visits to churches. When widowed, she was still a virgin, and dedicated herself to charity.

== Veneration ==
The cult of Pharaildis has been documented as early as the eighth century. About the year 754, Agilfrid, Abbot of Saint Bavo's Abbey, acquired her relics and brought them to Ghent. Her feast day is January 4, and her feast, Fru Verelde, was a major festival in Ghent in the late 19th century (according to Acte de Pharailde 1882). She carries a goose as her insignia.

Several miracles are attributed to the saint. Legend says that Pharaildis caused a well to spring up whose waters cured sick children, turned some bread hidden by a miserly woman into stone, and there are accounts of a "goose miracle," in which Pharaildis resuscitated a cooked bird working only from its skin and bones.
