= Emebert =

French bishop and saint

Saint Emebert

Bishop of Cambrai
- Born: 7th century Brabant, Frankish Empire
- Died: 710; Cambrai, Frankish Empire
- Venerated in: Eastern Orthodox Church and Catholic Church
- Canonized: pre-congregation
- Major shrine: Maubeuge Abbey
- Feast: 15 January

Emebert was an early Bishop of Cambrai, in northern France; he is often identified with Bishop Ablebert of Cambrai (early 8th century).

According to the unreliable Vita S. Amalbergae viduae, Emebert was the son of Duke Witger of Lotharingia. His mother was Saint Amalberga of Maubeuge. His siblings include four other saints, Gudula, the martyred Reineldis, Pharaildis and Ermelindis.

Emebert was possibly a missionary bishop who evangelized Brabant, his native country. After the death of his sister Gudula in 712, her tomb was desecrated, and Emebert then excommunicated the desecrators.

According to the Gesta Episcoporum Cameracensis (Acts of the Bishops of Cambrai), he was buried in a place called Ham, located in the vicinity of Cambrai. His body was afterwards taken to Maubeuge Abbey, where his mother had become a nun. He is probably identical with Bishop Hildebert of Cambrai-Arras, who died around 700 and is buried at Maubeuge.

His feast day is celebrated on the 15 January. He is particularly venerated at Arras, Cambrai and Ghent. He is also venerated in the Orthodox Church on February 22.

== Sources ==
- Gesta Ableberti: Bollandus J., Henschenius G., 'De S. Ableberto, sive Emeberto, episcopo Cameracensi et Atrebatensi', Acta Sanctorum Januarii Tomus I (1643) 1077–1080.
- Holweck, F. G., A Biographical Dictionary of the Saints. St. Louis, MO: B. Herder Book Co. 1924.
