= Chalke =

Gate to the Byzantine Great Palace of Constantinople

Coordinates: 41°0′21″N 28°58′38″E

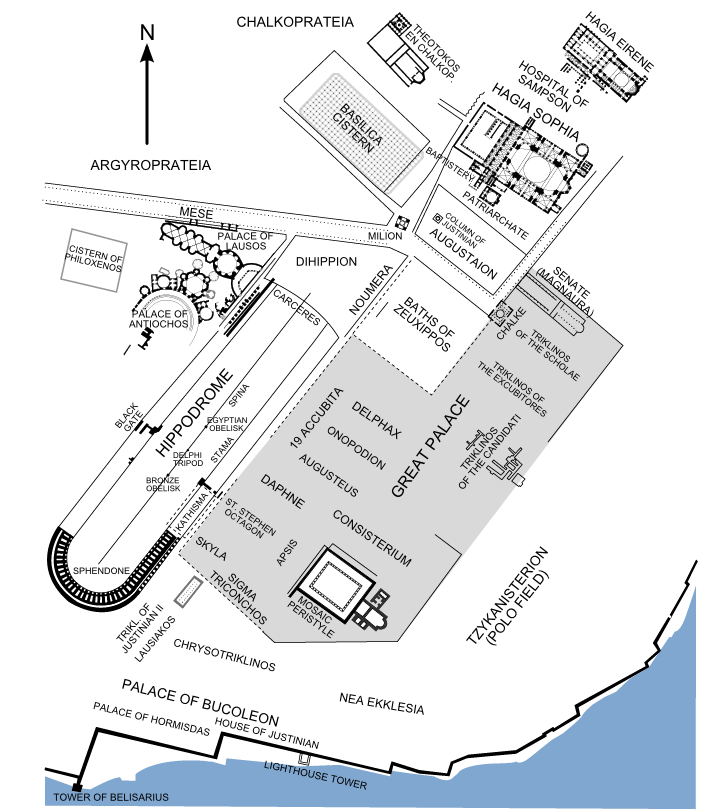
Map of the ceremonial and administrative heart of Constantinople, showing the Chalke Gate in the right centre

The Chalke Gate (Greek: Χαλκῆ Πύλη), was the main ceremonial entrance (vestibule) to the Great Palace of Constantinople in the Byzantine period. The name, which means "the Bronze Gate", was given to it either because of the bronze portals or from the gilded bronze tiles used in its roof. The interior was lavishly decorated with marble and mosaics, and the exterior façade featured a number of statues. Most prominent was an icon of Christ which became a major iconodule symbol during the Byzantine Iconoclasm, and a chapel dedicated to the Christ Chalkites was erected in the 10th century next to the gate. The gate itself seems to have been demolished in the 13th century, but the chapel survived until the early 19th century.

== History ==
The gate lay on the southeastern corner of the Augustaion, the main ceremonial plaza of the city, with the Hagia Sophia cathedral on the northern side and the Baths of Zeuxippos and the Hippodrome of Constantinople on the southern and western sides.

The first structure in that location was erected by the architect Aetherius during the reign of Emperor Anastasius I (r. 491–518) to celebrate the victory in the Isaurian War (492–497). Like much of the city's center, this structure burned down in the Nika riots of 532, and was subsequently rebuilt by the Emperor Justinian I (r. 527–565). This building was extensively described by the historian Procopius in his De Aedificiis. In the 7th and 8th centuries, the Chalke itself or its dependencies became a prison, until Emperor Basil I (r. 867–886) repaired it and converted it into a law court.

Emperor Romanos I Lekapenos (r. 920–944) attached a small chapel dedicated to Christ Chalkites (Χριστός Χαλκίτης), which was later rebuilt on a grander scale by Emperor John I Tzimiskes (r. 969–976), who endowed it with relics and was himself buried there. This rebuilding was facilitated by the fact that his predecessor, Emperor Nikephoros II Phokas (r. 963–969), had enclosed the palace precinct with a new wall of reduced girth, to which the Chalke was no longer attached. The main gatehouse, denuded of its bronze gates by Emperor Isaac II Angelos during his first reign (1185–1195), is not mentioned by Byzantine chroniclers after c. 1200. The chapel however survived long after: it is mentioned as being largely intact by Russian pilgrims in the 14th century, and in Ottoman times, the ruins of the chapel were known as Arslanhane and functioned as a menagerie. The remains of the chapel are depicted in 18th-century drawings, until finally demolished in 1804.

== Description ==
Several literary descriptions of the gate survive. Procopius is the earliest and most prominent source, but accounts of the statues decorating the gatehouse's façade also come from the later Parastaseis syntomoi chronikai.

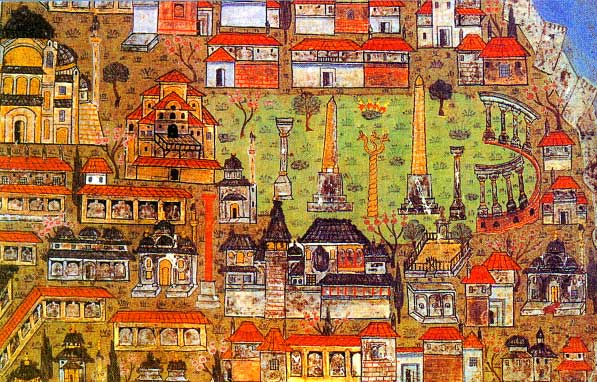
Enlightenment of the Hippodrome of Constantinople made by the Ottoman miniaturist Matrakçı Nasuh of 1536. The Church of Christ Calcita, known in this period as Arslan Hane, is the large red-orange vaulted building with a terrace, to the left of the flourishing meadow (the site of the old Hippodrome) and to the right of St. Sophia

Justinian's Chalke was a rectangular building, with four engaged piers supporting a central dome on pendentives, which in turn rested on four barrel arches in the typical Byzantine fashion. The piers to the south and north were somewhat lower than those to the east and west. The central structure was adjoined by two smaller chambers on either side to the south and north, each again featuring a vaulted roof. The relation of the Church of Christ Chalkites with the gate is unclear; Cyril Mango suggested that it was located to its left, but it has also been proposed that it was actually built atop the gatehouse itself. It is known that the chapel was placed atop an elevated platform, and 18th-century depictions locate it some 100 m southeast of the Hagia Sophia.

The vestibule's interior decoration is also described by Procopius: the walls were decorated with slabs of multi-colored marble, while the ceilings were covered with mosaics, which depicted Justinian and his wife Theodora flanked by the Senate, as well as the victories of Belisarius in the Vandalic and Gothic wars and his triumphal return bearing spoils, defeated kings and kingdoms to his emperor.

The external decoration is comparatively unknown, but the Parastaseis syntomoi record the existence of various statues, probably placed in niches above the central doorway. These included Emperor Maurice (r. 582–602) and his wife and children, a pair of statues of philosophers taken from Athens, stretching their arms towards one another, statues of Emperor Zeno (r. 474–491) and Empress Ariadne, as well as four gorgon heads from the Temple of Artemis at Ephesus that "surround the Chalke with the sign of the cross above them". The same text also records that statues of Emperor Maximian (r. 285–305) and the entire House of Theodosius were located "nearby", while the exact location of a statue of Empress Pulcheria in relation to the building is unclear. Cyril Mango, who studied the problem of the statuary recorded in the Parastaseis, concluded that the references came from a text written in ca. 600 – in great part because the images of Emperor Maurice and his family are unlikely to have survived their overthrow and murder by Phocas in 602.

== Icon of Christ Chalkites ==
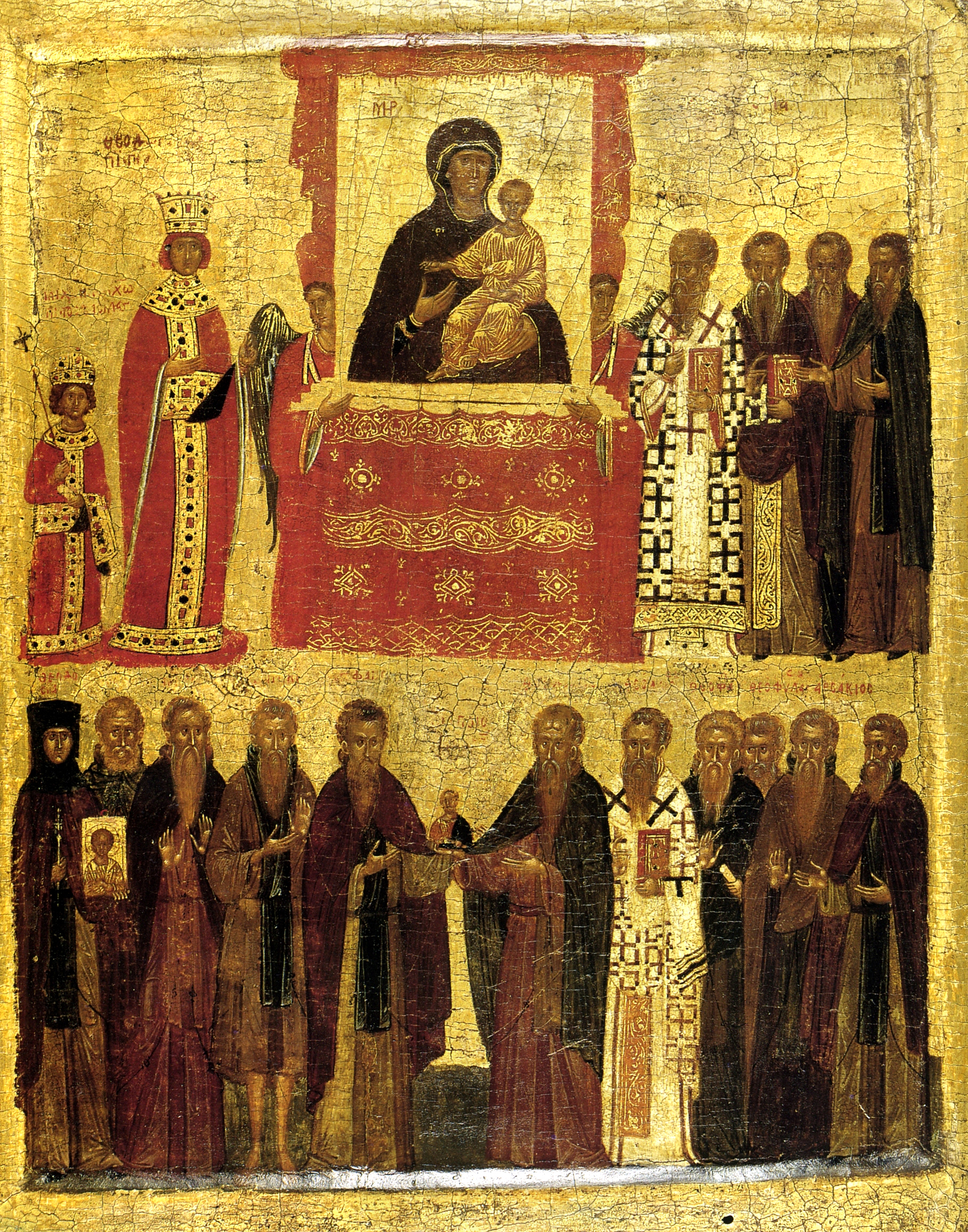
Icon celebrating the "Triumph of Orthodoxy" and the restoration of icon veneration in 843. Saint Theodosia, an iconodule martyr, is depicted first left on the lower row, carrying the icon of Christ Chalkites.

Above the main entrance of the Chalke, there stood an icon of Christ, the so-called Christ Chalkites ("Christ of the Chalke"). The origins of the icon are obscure: based on its mention in the Parastaseis, it may have existed by ca. 600, but it cannot be stated with any certainty. Its prominent display on the very entrance to the imperial palace made it one of the city's major religious symbols. Consequently, its removal, in 726 or 730, by Emperor Leo III the Isaurian (r. 717–741), was both a major political statement and a spark for violent rioting in the city, and marked the beginning of the official prohibition of icons in the Empire. The icon was restored a first time by Empress Eirene in ca. 787, until it was again removed by Leo V the Armenian (r. 813–820) and replaced by a simple cross. After the definitive restoration of the veneration of icons in 843, a mosaic icon by the famed iconodule monk and artist Lazaros replaced it.

The exact appearance of the icon is unclear: although the early image has been interpreted as a bust of the Christ Pantocrator type, late Byzantine references, such as coins by John III Vatatzes (r. 1221–1254) and the Deesis mosaic in the Chora Church, use the term for depictions of a standing Christ on a pedestal.

== Sources ==
- Cameron, Averil; Herrin, Judith (1984). Constantinople in the early eighth century: the Parastaseis syntomoi chronikai (introduction, translation, and commentary). Brill Archive. ISBN 978-90-04-07010-3.
- Cormack, Robin (2000). Byzantine art. Oxford University Press. ISBN 978-0-19-284211-4.
- Janin, Raymond (1964). Constantinople Byzantine. Développement urbaine et répertoire topographique (in French). Paris.
- Kazhdan, Alexander, ed. (1991). Oxford Dictionary of Byzantium. Oxford University Press. ISBN 978-0-19-504652-6.
- Majeska, George P. (1984). Russian Travelers to Constantinople in the Fourteenth and Fifteenth Centuries. Dumbarton Oaks. ISBN 978-0-88402-101-8.
- Mango, Cyril (1959). The Brazen House; a study of the vestibule of the imperial palace of Constantinople. Copenhagen.
