= Epiphania of Pavia =

Saint Epiphania
- Died: 800
- Venerated in: Roman Catholic Church; Eastern Orthodox Church
- Feast: 6 October

Epiphania, Epifania or Pyphania (died 800) is recorded in the late medieval traditions of Pavia as daughter of Ratchis (744/749 – 756/757), King of the Lombards and of Italy.

She was a Benedictine nun and was buried in the monastery of S. Maria Foris Portam, which was founded in Pavia, the Lombard capital, by her father.
