= Bertulf of Renty =

Saint Bertulf, O.S.B. (alternate Bertulph, also known as Bertoul) was born in either Pannonia (Hungary) or Germany; he died in Artois in 705. He became a monk later in his life and founded a Benedictine abbey at Renty.

Bertulf migrated to the County of Artois, where he converted to Christianity. For years, he was steward to Count Lambert, whom he served so faithfully that the Count entrusted the administration of his entire estate to Bertulf and gave him the land of Renty, where Bertulf later built a monastery. Upon his benefactor's death, Bertoul became a monk and retired there as abbot. He died a monk in Artois.

In art, Saint Bertulf is shown sheltered from the rain by an eagle. He may also be portrayed holding a ship or changing water into wine. He is venerated in Germany and the Netherlands and invoked against storms.

His feast day is kept on 5 February.
