= Bercthun =

Anglo-Saxon Catholic saint (died 733)

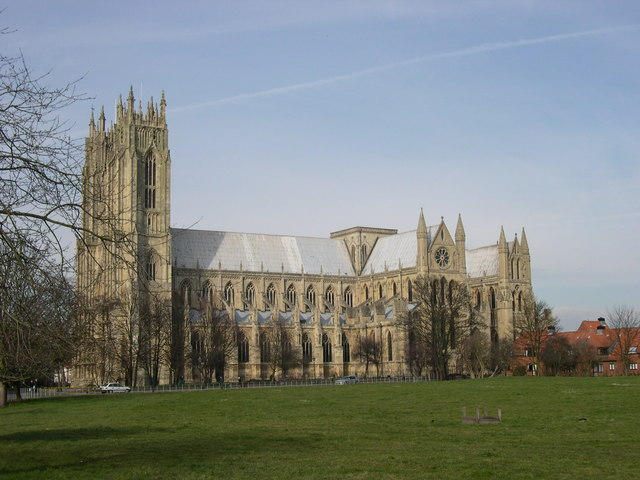
Beverley Minster, where he lived

Bercthun of Beverley (died 15 May 733) also known as Bertin, Britwin, Berhthu and Beorhthun, was an eighth century Anglo-Saxon saint.

He was a Benedictine monk of Beverley, a disciple of John of Beverley and Bede's informant about much of Bede's history regarding Beverley. Latter in life he became the Abbot of Beverley. He was also known from the secgan hagiographies.

A bust of Bercthun is thought to be kept in the British Library.

Be died on the 15 May 733, on which day his feast was locally kept. A feast day was celebrated locally in his honour on the date of his death.
