= List of Frankish queens consort =

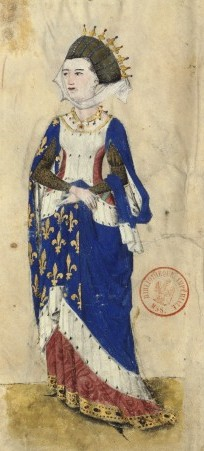
Marguerite of Provence, Queen of Louis IX, was the last French queen to use the title of Queen of the Franks.

This is a list of the women who have been queens consort of the Frankish people. As all kings of the Franks have been male, there has never been a queen regnant of the Franks (although some women have governed as regents).

A timeline of consorts Frankish rulers is difficult since the realm was frequently divided among the sons of a king upon his death and then eventually reunited. Also, polygamy and concubinage complicate matters. Of most Merovingian queens almost nothing but the name is known.

This list starts from the earliest known queens until the three-way split up of the Frankish Empire in the Treaty of Verdun in 843.

== Merovingian dynasty (450–751) ==
Clovis I united all the Frankish petty kingdoms as well as most of Roman Gaul under his rule, conquering the Domain of Soissons of the Roman general Syagrius as well as the Visigothic Kingdom of Toulouse. He took his seat at Paris, which along with Soissons, Reims, Metz, and Orléans became the chief residences. Upon his death, the kingdom was split among his four sons.

Picture	Name	Father	Birth	Marriage	Became Consort	Ceased to be Consort	Death	Spouse
	Basina of Thuringia	Basin, King of the Thuringii	438	?		481 husband's death	491	Childeric I
	Clotilde of Burgundy	Chilperic II of Burgundy	475	493		27 November 511 husband's death	545	Clovis I

=== Queens at Soissons (511–558) ===
Picture	Name	Father	Birth	Marriage	Became Consort	Ceased to be Consort	Death	Spouse
	Guntheuc		around 495	after 523		524/540		Chlothar I
	Radegund of Thuringia	Bertachar of Thuringia	486–516	525/545		after 531 repudiated	13 August 586	Chlothar I
	Ingund	Baderic of Thuringia	490–510	526/550		unknown, maybe 546 or after		Chlothar I
	Waldrada	Wacho, King of the Lombards (Lethings)	521–542	555/559		555/61 given in marriage to Garibald I, Duke of Bavaria under the advice of the bishops	unknown, after 526	Chlothar I

=== Queens at Paris (511–558) ===
Picture	Name	Father	Birth	Marriage	Became Consort	Ceased to be Consort	Death	Spouse
	Ultrogotha	?	497	?	27 November 511 husband's accession	23 December 558 husband's death	566	Childebert I
Kingdom passed to Soissons
Picture	Name	Father	Birth	Marriage	Became Consort	Ceased to be Consort	Death	Spouse

=== Queens at Orléans (511–524) ===
Picture	Name	Father	Birth	Marriage	Became Consort	Ceased to be Consort	Death	Spouse
	Guntheuc		495	514 or 521		21 June 524 husband's death	532	Chlodomer
Kingdom passed to Soissons, Paris, and Rheims
Picture	Name	Father	Birth	Marriage	Became Consort	Ceased to be Consort	Death	Spouse

=== Queens at Reims (511–555) ===
Picture	Name	Father	Birth	Marriage	Became Consort	Ceased to be Consort	Death	Spouse
	Eustere of the Visigoths	Alaric II, King of the Visigoths	488	511		?	521	Theuderic I
	Suavegotha of Burgundy	Sigismund, King of the Burgundians	495/96/504	516/7		534 husband's death	554	Theuderic I
	Wisigard	Wacho, King of the Lombards	?	?	534 husband's ascession	?	?	Theudebert I
	Deuteria	Gallo-Roman descent	?	?	?	548 husband's death	?	Theudebert I
	Waldrada	Wacho, King of the Lombards	531	?	548? husband's ascession	555? husband's death	572	Theodobald
Kingdom passed to Soissons

=== Queen of the Franks (558–561) ===
Picture	Name	Father	Birth	Marriage	Became Consort	Ceased to be Consort	Death	Spouse
	Aregund	Baderic of Thuringia	515	?	558 husband's ascession	561 husband's death	573	Chlothar I
	Chunsina	?	?	?	558? husband's ascession	561? husband's death	?	Chlothar I

==== Queens in Neustria (Soissons, 561–613) ====
Picture	Name	Father	Birth	Marriage	Became Consort	Ceased to be Consort	Death	Spouse
	Audovera	?	525?	549–558	561 husband's ascession	~567 repudiated	October/November 580	Chilperic I
	Galswintha	Athanagild, King of Visigoths	540	567		568		Chilperic I
	Fredegund	539–553	?	568		September 584 husband's death - became queen regent	8 December 597	Chilperic I
	Haldetrude	?	575/594	?	?	?	604/629	Chlothar II
	Bertrude	Wagon II, Count of Vermandois	582	?613?		618/619		Chlothar II
	Sichilde	Count Brunulphe II of the Ardennes	590	?618?		627		

==== Queens at Paris (561–567) ====
Picture	Name	Father	Birth	Marriage	Became Consort	Ceased to be Consort	Death	Spouse
	Ingoberga		519?	?	?	? repudiated	589	Charibert I
	Merofleda	a wool-carder	?	after 561		?	?	Charibert I
	Marcovefa	a wool-carder	?	after 561		?	before 567	Charibert I
	Theudechild	a cowherd	?	after 561		?	567	Charibert I

==== Queens at Orléans/Burgundy (561–613) ====
Picture	Name	Father	Birth	Marriage	Became Consort	Ceased to be Consort	Death	Spouse
	Vénérande	a slave	?	?	?	?	?	Guntram
	Marcatrude	Magnar (Magnacaire d'Outre-Jura)	?	?		565?		Guntram
	Austregilde	?	548	565		580		Guntram
	Faileube	?	?	?	?	?	?	Childebert II
	Ermenberga	Witteric, King of the Visigoths	?	606		607 repudiated	?	Theuderic II

==== Queen at Reims/Metz (Austrasia, 561–613) ====
Picture	Name	Father	Birth	Marriage	Became Consort	Ceased to be Consort	Death	Spouse
	Brunhilda	Athanagild, King of the Visigoths	543?	567		December 575 husband's death	613	Sigebert I
	Faileube	?	?	?	?	?	?	Childebert II
	Bilichild	?	?	608		610		Theudebert II
	Théoudehilde	?	?	?	?	?	?	Theudebert II
Passed to Burgundy in 612.

=== Queen of the Franks (613–629) ===
Picture	Name	Father	Birth	Marriage	Became Consort	Ceased to be Consort	Death	Spouse
	Bertrude	Wagon II, Count of Vermandois	582	?613?		618/619		Chlothar II
	Sichilde	?	c. 590	618		18 October 629 husband's death	ap. 627	Chlothar II

==== Queens of Neustria and Burgundy (629–691) ====
Picture	Name	Father	Birth	Marriage	Became Consort	Ceased to be Consort	Death	Spouse
	Gomentrude	?	598	628		629 répudiée	after 630	Dagobert I
	Nanthild the Saxon	?	c. 610	c. 629		19 January 639 husband's death	642	Dagobert I
	Ragintrudis	?	610?	?	?	?	?	Dagobert I
	Wulfefundis	?	?	?	?	?	?	Dagobert I
	Bertechildis	?	?	?	?	?	?	Dagobert I
	Balthild	Anglo-Saxon aristocrat	626 or 627	649		27 November 655 or 658 husband's death	30 January 680	Clovis II
	Amatilda	?	?	?	?	?	?	Chlothar III
	Bilichild	Sigebert III of Austrasia	654	668	673 invasion of Neustria and Burgundy	675		Childeric II
	Chrothildis	Ansegisel	650	675			3 June 699	Theuderic III
United with Austrasia to form a single Frankish state

==== Queen of Austrasia (623–679) ====
Picture	Name	Father	Birth	Marriage	Became Consort	Ceased to be Consort	Death	Spouse
	Gomentrude	?	598	628		629 répudiée	after 630	Dagobert I
	Nanthild	?	c. 610	c. 629		c. 629 kingdom went to stepson	642	Dagobert I
	Ragintrudis	?	610?	?	?	?	?	Dagobert I
	Wulfefundis	?	?	?	?	?	?	Dagobert I
	Bertechildis	?	?	?	?	?	?	Dagobert I
	Chimnechild of Burgundy	?	?	647		?	?	Sigebert III
	Amatilda	?	?	?	?	?	?	Chlothar III
	Bilichild	_{Sigebert III of Austrasia}	654	668		675		Childeric II
	Chrothildis	Ansegisel	650	675			3 June 699	Theuderic III
United with Neustria and Burgundy

==== Queen of Aquitaine (629–632) ====
Picture	Name	Father	Birth	Marriage	Became Consort	Ceased to be Consort	Death	Spouse
	Gisela of Gascony?	Amand of Gascony	?	?	18 October 629 husband's ascession	8 April 632 husband's death	?	Charibert II
	Fulberte?	?	?	?	?	?	?	Charibert II
Kingdom passed to Neustria and Burgundy in 632; dukes were appointed to Aquitaine

=== Queen of the Franks (629–751) ===
Picture	Name	Father	Birth	Marriage	Became Consort	Ceased to be Consort	Death	Spouse
	Gomentrude	?	598	628		629 répudiée	after 630	Dagobert I
	Nanthild	?	c. 610	c. 629			642	Dagobert I
	Ragintrudis	?	610?	?	?	?	?	Dagobert I
	Wulfefundis	?	?	?	?	?	?	Dagobert I
	Bertechildis	?	?	?	?	?	?	Dagobert I
	Amatilda	?	?	?	661 husband's ascession	662 husband loses Austrasia	?	Chlothar III
	Bilichild	Sigebert III of Austrasia	654	668	673 husband's ascession	675		Childeric II
	Chrothildis	Ansegisel	650	675	679 husband's ascession	690 husband's death	3 June 699	Theuderic III
	Gisela	?	715	?	743 husband's ascession	751 husband deposed	755	Childeric III

== Carolingian dynasty (751–987) ==
=== Queen of the Franks (751–843) ===
Picture	Name	Father	Birth	Marriage	Became Consort	Ceased to be Consort	Death	Spouse
	Bertrada of Laon	Caribert, Count of Laon	710/27	740	November 751 as sole-Queen consort of the Franks	24 September 768 husband's death	12 July 783	Pepin I
	Gerberga	?	?	?	24 September 768 as co-Queen consort of the Franks	4 December 771 husband's death	?	Carloman I
	Desiderata of the Lombards	Desiderius, King of the Lombards	?	770 as co-Queen consort of the Franks		771 repuditated	?	Charles I
	Hildegard	Gerold of Vinzgouw	758	771 as sole-Queen consort of the Franks; 774 as Queen consort the Lombards; 781 as co-Queen consort the Lombards		30 April 783		Charles I
	Fastrada de Franconie	Raoul III de Franconie et d'Aéda de Bavière	765	784 as sole-Queen consort of the Franks and co-Queen consort the Lombards		10 October 794		Charles I
	Luitgard de Sundgau	Luitfrid II, Count of Sundgau	776	794 as sole-Queen consort of the Franks and co-Queen consort the Lombards		4 June 800		Charles I
	Ermengarde of Hesbaye	Ingerman, Count of Hesbaye	778	794/5	813 as Holy Roman Empress and Queen consort of the Franks 817 as senior Holy Roman Empress	3 October 818		Louis I
	Judith of Bavaria	Welf I, Count of Altdorf	805	819 as senior Holy Roman Empress and Queen consort of the Franks		20 June 840 husband's death	19/23 April 843	Louis I
Picture	Name	Father	Birth	Marriage	Became Consort	Ceased to be Consort	Death	Spouse

=== After the Treaty of Verdun ===
The Frankish kingdom was then divided by the Treaty of Verdun in 843. Lothair I was allowed to keep his imperial title and his kingdom of Italy, and granted the newly created Kingdom of Middle Francia, a corridor of land stretching from Italy to the North Sea, and including the Low Countries, the Rhineland (including Aachen), Burgundy, and Provence. Charles the Bald was confirmed in Aquitaine, where Pepin I's son Pepin II was opposing him, and granted West Francia (modern France), the lands west of Lothair's Kingdom. Louis the German was confirmed in Bavaria and granted East Francia (modern Germany), the lands east of Lothair's kingdom. Ermentrude of Orléans (first wife of Charles II) became the Queen of Western Francia (eventually France); Emma of Altdorf (wife of Louis II) became the Queen of Eastern Francia (eventually Germany); and Ermengarde of Tours (wife of Lothair I) became the Queen of Middle Francia (eventually Lotharingia). The title of Queen of the Franks continued on to the 12th and 13th century in France.

==== Queen of the Franks (843–987) ====
West Francia	Middle Francia		East Francia	Spouse
Ermentrude of Orléans; Queen of Aquitaine: 842–855; Queen of the East Franks: 843–869	Ermengarde of Tours; Queen of Italy: 818–844; Queen of the Middle Franks: 843–851; Holy Roman Empress: 821–851		Emma of Altdorf; Queen of Bavaria: 817–843; Queen of the East Franks: 843–876	Charles II; Lothair I Louis II
Ermentrude of Orléans; Queen of Aquitaine: 842–855; Queen of the East Franks: 843–869	Engelberga of Parma; Queen of Italy: 851–875; Holy Roman Empress: 850–875	Teutberga; Queen of Lotharingia: 855–869	Emma of Altdorf; Queen of Bavaria: 817–843; Queen of the East Franks: 843–876	Charles II; Louis II; Lothair II; Louis II
Richilde of Provence; Queen of the West Franks: 870–877; Queen of Italy: 875–877; Holy Roman Empress: 875–877		Emma of Altdorf; Queen of Bavaria: 817–843; Queen of the East Franks: 843–876		Charles II; Louis II
Adelaide of Paris; Queen of the West Franks: 877–879		Liutgard of Saxony; Queen of Saxony: 879–882; Queen of Bavaria: 880–882; Queen of the East Franks: 880–882		Louis II; Louis III
Richardis of Swabia; Holy Roman Empress: 881–888; Queen of the East Franks: 882–887; Queen of the West Franks: 884–888				Charles III
Théodrate of Troyes; Queen of the West Franks: 888–898		Ota; Queen of the East Franks: 888–899; Queen of Italy: 896–899; Holy Roman Empress: 896–899		Odo; Arnulf
Frederuna; Queen of the West Franks: 907–917		Cunigunde of Swabia; Queen of the East Franks: 913–918; Duchess of Franconia: 913–918		Charles III; Conrad I
Eadgifu of England; Queen of the West Franks: 919–922		Matilda; Queen of the East Franks: 919–936; Duchess of Saxony: 912–936		Charles III; Robert I Rudolph; Henry I
Béatrice of Vermandois; Queen of the West Franks: 922–923		Matilda; Queen of the East Franks: 919–936; Duchess of Saxony: 912–936		Charles III; Robert I Rudolph; Henry I
Emma of France; Queen of the West Franks: 923–934		Matilda; Queen of the East Franks: 919–936; Duchess of Saxony: 912–936		Charles III; Robert I Rudolph; Henry I
Gerberga of Saxony; Queen of the (West) Franks: 939–954		After the death of Henry, the last King of the East Franks, the only remaining Frankish kings were in Western Francia, which would become the modern state of France.		Louis IV
Emma of Italy; Queen of the (West) Franks: 965–986		After the death of Henry, the last King of the East Franks, the only remaining Frankish kings were in Western Francia, which would become the modern state of France.		Lothair
Adelaide of Anjou; Queen of Aquitaine: 980–982		After the death of Henry, the last King of the East Franks, the only remaining Frankish kings were in Western Francia, which would become the modern state of France.		Louis V
Queens of West Francia	Queens of Middle Francia		Queens of East Francia	Spouse

After the death of Louis V of France, the last male line Carolingian king of the Franks, in 987, the Capetians succeeded to the Frankish titles and their consorts bore the title Queen consort of the Franks until 1227, although history knows them better as Queen consorts of France.

Although some of these Frankish queens held titles such as Holy Roman Empress, Queen consort of Italy, Aquitaine, Saxony, Burgundy, Orléans, Paris, Bavaria, Provence, Soissons, Lotharingia, Swabia, and Alamannia; this is not a complete list of those consorts.

== See also ==
- Kings of France family tree
- List of French monarchs
- List of French consorts
- List of Frankish kings
- List of Holy Roman Empresses
- List of German queens
