= 675 =

Calendar year

675 in various calendars
Gregorian calendar	675; DCLXXV
Ab urbe condita	1428
Armenian calendar	124; ԹՎ ՃԻԴ
Assyrian calendar	5425
Balinese saka calendar	596–597
Bengali calendar	81–82
Berber calendar	1625
Buddhist calendar	1219
Burmese calendar	37
Byzantine calendar	6183–6184
Chinese calendar	甲戌年 (Wood Dog); 3372 or 3165 — to — 乙亥年 (Wood Pig); 3373 or 3166
Coptic calendar	391–392
Discordian calendar	1841
Ethiopian calendar	667–668
Hebrew calendar	4435–4436
- Hindu calendars
Vikram Samvat	731–732
Shaka Samvat	596–597
Kali Yuga	3775–3776
Holocene calendar	10675
Iranian calendar	53–54
Islamic calendar	55–56
Japanese calendar	Hakuchi 26 (白雉２６年)
Javanese calendar	566–568
Julian calendar	675; DCLXXV
Korean calendar	3008
Minguo calendar	1237 before ROC 民前1237年
Nanakshahi calendar	−793
Seleucid era	986/987 AG
Thai solar calendar	1217–1218
Tibetan calendar	ཤིང་ཕོ་ཁྱི་ལོ་ (male Wood-Dog); 801 or 420 or −352 — to — ཤིང་མོ་ཕག་ལོ་ (female Wood-Boar); 802 or 421 or −351

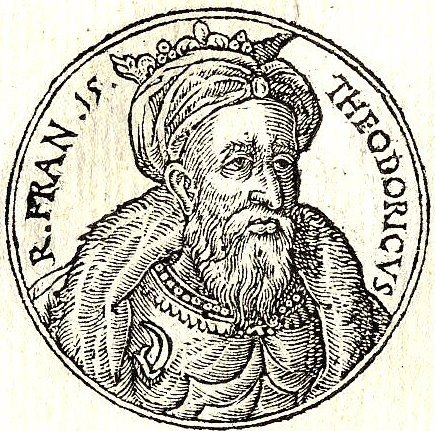
King Theuderic III (654–691)

Year 675 (DCLXXV) was a common year starting on Monday of the Julian calendar. The denomination 675 for this year has been used since the early medieval period, when the Anno Domini calendar era became the prevalent method in Europe for naming years.

== Events ==
=== By place ===
==== Europe ====
- King Childeric II is murdered by a band of dissatisfied Neustrians, along with his wife Bilichild and 5-year-old son Dagobert, while hunting in the forest of Livry (modern-day Lognes) near Chelles.
- Theuderic III retakes the throne of his elder brother Childeric II. He inherits the Frankish kingdoms of Neustria and Burgundy.
- Clovis III, an illegitimate son of Chlothar III, is proclaimed king of Austrasia by the Austrasian nobles.

==== Britain ====
- King Wulfhere of Mercia dies after a 17-year reign, in which he has extended his sway over much of England south of the Humber River, including Essex, Surrey, and part of Wessex north of the Thames. Wulfhere is succeeded by his brother Æthelred.
- April 1 – King Hlothhere of Kent re-establishes Kentish supremacy in London.

==== Asia ====
- 25-year-old poet Wang Bo (王勃) writes Tengwang Ge Xu, to celebrate the Tengwang Pavilion (approximate date).
- January 5 – In Japan, a platform to observe the stars for astrologers is erected for the first time.
- March 14 – Princess Tōchi and Princess Abe of Japan proceed to Ise Jingū.
- March 16 – Emperor Tenmu decrees the end of serfdom. He also orders an end to granting lands to Princes of the Blood, to Princes and to Ministers and Temples.
- May 8 – Tenmu issues a decree to distribute the tax-rice for peasants in poverty, as well as a decree regulating fishing and hunting, and ordering a halt to eating the flesh of cattle, horses, dogs, monkeys and barn-yard fowl, a prohibition which lasts until 1872.
- Some Japanese ministers who oppose Tenmu are banished to an isolated island. A man climbs the hill east of the Palace, curses the emperor and kills himself.
- September 16 – A typhoon strikes Japan.

=== By topic ===
==== Religion ====
- The abbeys of Abingdon and Bath, England are founded (approximate date).
- Aldhelm is made abbot of Malmesbury Abbey in England.

== Births ==
- Boniface, Anglo-Saxon missionary (approximate date)
- Huoching, Alamannic nobleman (approximate date)
- Niu Xianke, chancellor of the Tang dynasty (d. 742)
- Sulayman ibn Abd al-Malik, Muslim caliph (approximate date; d. 717)
- Tervel, ruler (khagan) of the Bulgarian Empire (d. 721)
- Wigbert, Anglo-Saxon monk (approximate date)

== Deaths ==
- February 18 – Colmán, bishop of Lindisfarne
- February 21 – Randoald of Grandval, prior of the Benedictine monastery of Grandval
- May 25 – Li Hong, prince of the Tang dynasty (b. 652)
- Bilichild, Frankish queen
- Childeric II, king of the Franks
- Germanus of Granfelden, Frankish abbot
- Lupus I, duke of Aquitaine (approximate date)
- Máel Dub, Irish monk (approximate date)
- Wulfhere, king of Mercia
