= 656 =

Calendar year

656 in various calendars
- Gregorian calendar: 656; DCLVI
- Ab urbe condita: 1409
- Armenian calendar: 105; ԹՎ ՃԵ
- Assyrian calendar: 5406
- Balinese saka calendar: 577–578
- Bengali calendar: 62–63
- Berber calendar: 1606
- Buddhist calendar: 1200
- Burmese calendar: 18
- Byzantine calendar: 6164–6165
- Chinese calendar: 乙卯年 (Wood Rabbit); 3353 or 3146 — to — 丙辰年 (Fire Dragon); 3354 or 3147
- Coptic calendar: 372–373
- Discordian calendar: 1822
- Ethiopian calendar: 648–649
- Hebrew calendar: 4416–4417
- Hindu calendars
- Vikram Samvat: 712–713
- Shaka Samvat: 577–578
- Kali Yuga: 3756–3757
- Holocene calendar: 10656
- Iranian calendar: 34–35
- Islamic calendar: 35–36
- Japanese calendar: Hakuchi 7 (白雉７年)
- Javanese calendar: 547–548
- Julian calendar: 656; DCLVI
- Korean calendar: 2989
- Minguo calendar: 1256 before ROC 民前1256年
- Nanakshahi calendar: −812
- Seleucid era: 967/968 AG
- Thai solar calendar: 1198–1199
- Tibetan calendar: ཤིང་མོ་ཡོས་ལོ་ (female Wood-Hare); 782 or 401 or −371 — to — མེ་ཕོ་འབྲུག་ལོ་ (male Fire-Dragon); 783 or 402 or −370

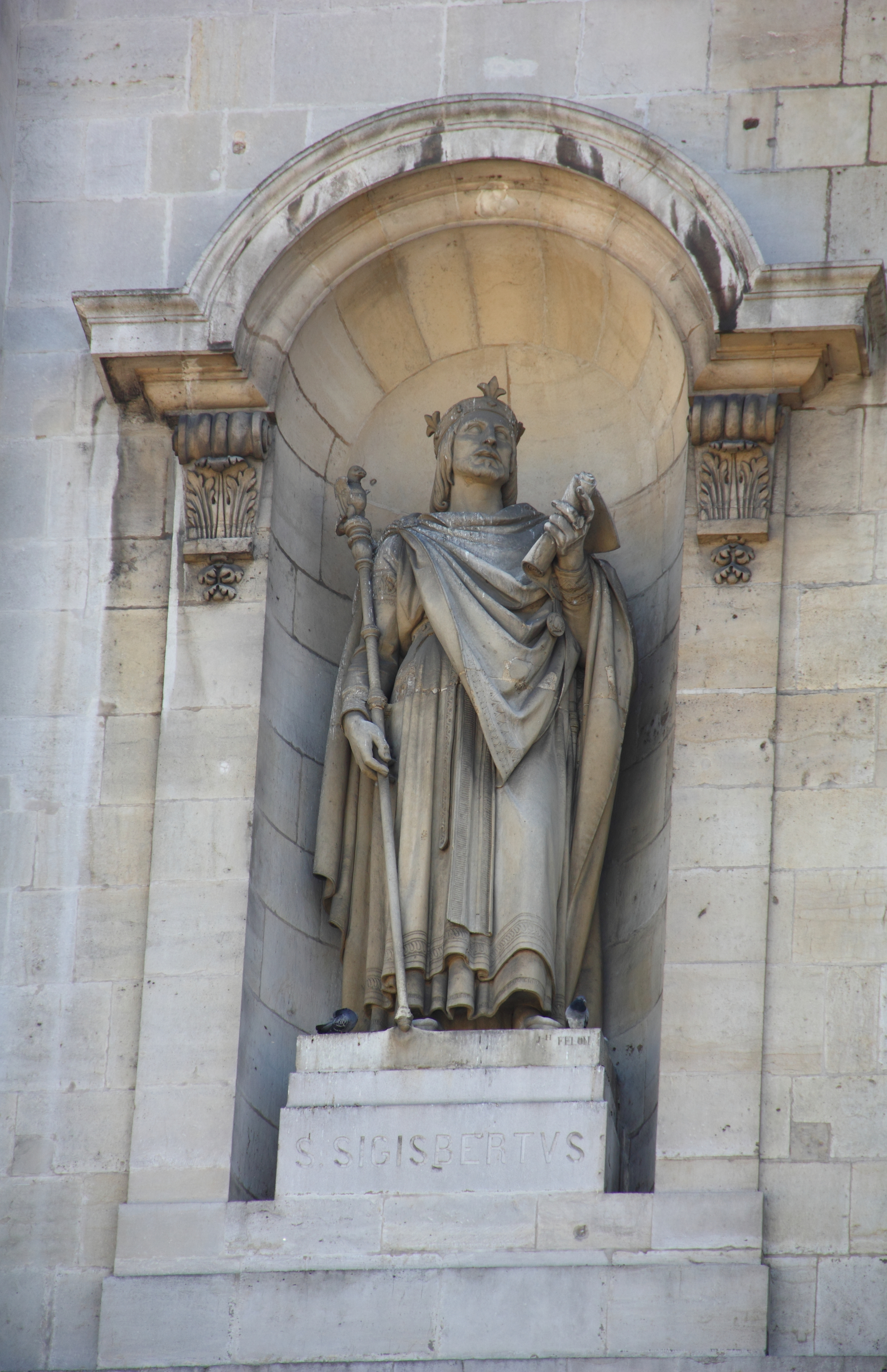
King Sigebert III of Austrasia (c. 630–656)

Year 656 (DCLVI) was a leap year starting on Friday of the Julian calendar. The denomination 656 for this year has been used since the early medieval period, when the Anno Domini calendar era became the prevalent method in Europe for naming years.

== Events ==
=== By place ===
==== Europe ====
- February 1 – King Sigebert III of Austrasia, age 25, dies after a 22-year reign. His 5-year-old son Dagobert II is kidnapped by the court chancellor, Grimoald the Elder, who makes his own son king, and exiles him to an Irish monastery. Dagobert is placed with Bishop Dido of Poitiers, while Grimoald's son Childebert the Adopted assumes the Austrasian throne.

==== Britain ====
- King Oswiu of Northumbria invades Pengwern (modern Wales) and kills King Cynddylan in battle, near the River Trent. Cynddylan's brother Morfael and the rest of the royal family flee to Glastening (Wessex).
- King Œthelwald of Deira is removed from office by his uncle Oswiu, because of his desertion at the Battle of the Winwaed, and replaced by the latter's son Alhfrith, as subject king in a united Northumbria.

==== Arabian Empire ====
- First Islamic Civil War: An armed revolt erupts in Egypt; several Muslim sympathisers travel to Medina to rally support, beginning the fitna (literally meaning the 'trail of faith'). The Muslim expansion comes to a halt as the martial energies of the Islamic forces are directed inwards.
- June 17 – Uthman ibn Affan is murdered at Medina after an 11-year reign. He is succeeded by Muhammad's cousin and son-in-law Ali ibn Abi-Talib, who becomes the fourth caliph of the Rashidun Caliphate. He makes Kufah (Iraq) his capital, but the succession is disputed.
- December 8 – Battle of the Camel: Rebel Arabs under Aisha (widow of Muhammad) begin a revolt against Ali. They are defeated at Basra, and Aisha is exiled to Medina. During the battle 10,000 people lose their lives, with each party bearing equal loss.
- Abdullah ibn Sa'ad, governor of Upper Egypt, dies after a 12-year regime in which he has defeated neighboring Nubia.

==== Asia ====
- Empress Saimei of Japan builds a new palace at Asuka (Nara Prefecture), because her former residence caught fire. This construction is called the "Mad Canal" by the people of that day, wasting the labor of tens of thousand workers and a large amount of money.

==== Polynesia ====
- September 24 – A total solar eclipse is observable from Easter Island. The next at this location would not occur until July 11, 2010.

=== By topic ===
==== Religion ====
- Li Xiăn, seventh son of the Chinese emperor Gao Zong, is made crown prince. His lavish palatial mansion in Chang'an is converted into a Daoist abbey during the Tang dynasty (approximate date).
- The Yasaka Shrine is constructed in the Gion district of Kyoto (Japan).

== Births ==
- Hubertus, bishop of Liège (approximate date)
- Zhong Zong, emperor of the Tang dynasty (d. 710)

== Deaths ==
- June 20 – Uthman ibn Affan, Muslim Caliph (b. 577) (martyred)
- Abdullah ibn Sa'ad, Arab governor
- Crundmáel Erbuilc, king of the Uí Ceinnselaig (Ireland)
- Cui Dunli, general of the Tang dynasty (b. 596)
- Cynddylan, king of Pengwern (Wales)
- Li Daozong, prince of the Tang dynasty
- Peada, king of Mercia (Midlands)
- Sigebert III, king of Austrasia (or 660)
- Zubayr ibn al-Awwam, Arab general (b. 594) (martyred)
