= 657 =

Calendar year

657 in various calendars
- Gregorian calendar: 657; DCLVII
- Ab urbe condita: 1410
- Armenian calendar: 106; ԹՎ ՃԶ
- Assyrian calendar: 5407
- Balinese saka calendar: 578–579
- Bengali calendar: 63–64
- Berber calendar: 1607
- Buddhist calendar: 1201
- Burmese calendar: 19
- Byzantine calendar: 6165–6166
- Chinese calendar: 丙辰年 (Fire Dragon); 3354 or 3147 — to — 丁巳年 (Fire Snake); 3355 or 3148
- Coptic calendar: 373–374
- Discordian calendar: 1823
- Ethiopian calendar: 649–650
- Hebrew calendar: 4417–4418
- Hindu calendars
- Vikram Samvat: 713–714
- Shaka Samvat: 578–579
- Kali Yuga: 3757–3758
- Holocene calendar: 10657
- Iranian calendar: 35–36
- Islamic calendar: 36–37
- Japanese calendar: Hakuchi 8 (白雉８年)
- Javanese calendar: 548–549
- Julian calendar: 657; DCLVII
- Korean calendar: 2990
- Minguo calendar: 1255 before ROC 民前1255年
- Nanakshahi calendar: −811
- Seleucid era: 968/969 AG
- Thai solar calendar: 1199–1200
- Tibetan calendar: མེ་ཕོ་འབྲུག་ལོ་ (male Fire-Dragon); 783 or 402 or −370 — to — མེ་མོ་སྦྲུལ་ལོ་ (female Fire-Snake); 784 or 403 or −369

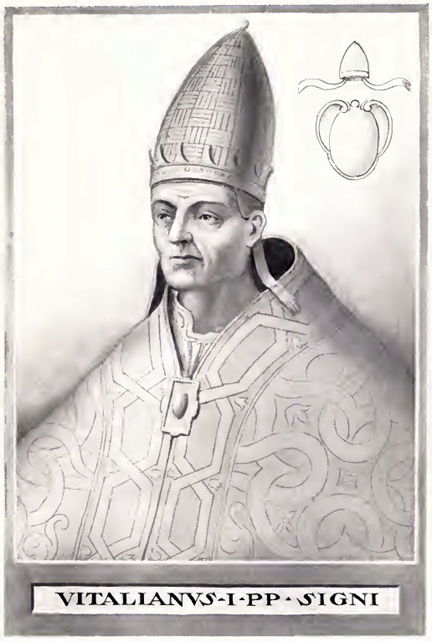
Pope Vitalian (657–672)

Year 657 (DCLVII) was a common year starting on Sunday of the Julian calendar. The denomination 657 for this year has been used since the early medieval period, when the Anno Domini calendar era became the prevalent method in Europe for naming years.

== Events ==
=== By place ===
==== Europe ====
- Grimoald the Elder, mayor of the palace of Austrasia, is deposed by Clovis II, king of Neustria. Clovis also captures Grimoald's son Childebert the Adopted, executing them both.
- Clovis II dies and is succeeded by his eldest son Chlothar III, age 5, who becomes king of Neustria and Burgundy, under the regency of his mother Balthild.

==== Arab Empire ====
- July 26 - July 28 – Battle of Siffin: Muslim forces under Ali ibn Abi-Talib fight an inconclusive battle against Mu'awiya I, on the banks of the Euphrates, near Raqqa (Syria).

==== Asia ====
- Tang campaigns against the Western Turks: Emperor Gao Zong dispatches a military campaign led by Su Dingfang. He annexes the Western Turkic Khaganate.
- Gao Zong commissions the pharmacology publication of an official materia medica, documenting the use of 833 different substances for medicinal purposes.

==== Americas ====
- In the course of the Second Tikal–Calakmul War, the Snake Lord (Yuknoom Ch'een II) makes a direct attack against Tikal itself, driving out its new ruler Nuun Ujol Chaak, and establishing Calakmul as the regional superpower. Bʼalaj Chan Kʼawiil, the one time heir apparent to rule Tikal, swears his allegiance to the new overlord.

=== By topic ===
==== Religion ====
- June 1 – Pope Eugene I dies at Rome after a reign of nearly 2½ years. He is succeeded by Vitalian as the 76th pope.
- Hilda, Anglo-Saxon abbess, founds a monastery at Streaneshalch, on the Yorkshire coast at Whitby (England).

== Births ==
- Ansprand, king of the Lombards (approximate date)

== Deaths ==
- June 2 – Pope Eugene I
- November 12 – Livinus, Irish apostle
- Ammar ibn Yasir, companion of Muhammad and Ali ibn Abi Talib (b. 570)
- Childebert the Adopted, king (usurper) of Austrasia
- Clovis II, king of Neustria and Burgundy (or 658)
- Grimoald the Elder, Mayor of the Palace (b. 616)
- Talorgan I, king of the Picts
