= 676 =

Calendar year

676 in various calendars
- Gregorian calendar: 676; DCLXXVI
- Ab urbe condita: 1429
- Armenian calendar: 125; ԹՎ ՃԻԵ
- Assyrian calendar: 5426
- Balinese saka calendar: 597–598
- Bengali calendar: 82–83
- Berber calendar: 1626
- Buddhist calendar: 1220
- Burmese calendar: 38
- Byzantine calendar: 6184–6185
- Chinese calendar: 乙亥年 (Wood Pig); 3373 or 3166 — to — 丙子年 (Fire Rat); 3374 or 3167
- Coptic calendar: 392–393
- Discordian calendar: 1842
- Ethiopian calendar: 668–669
- Hebrew calendar: 4436–4437
- Hindu calendars
- Vikram Samvat: 732–733
- Shaka Samvat: 597–598
- Kali Yuga: 3776–3777
- Holocene calendar: 10676
- Iranian calendar: 54–55
- Islamic calendar: 56–57
- Japanese calendar: Hakuchi 27 (白雉２７年)
- Javanese calendar: 568–569
- Julian calendar: 676; DCLXXVI
- Korean calendar: 3009
- Minguo calendar: 1236 before ROC 民前1236年
- Nanakshahi calendar: −792
- Seleucid era: 987/988 AG
- Thai solar calendar: 1218–1219
- Tibetan calendar: ཤིང་མོ་ཕག་ལོ་ (female Wood-Boar); 802 or 421 or −351 — to — མེ་ཕོ་བྱི་བ་ལོ་ (male Fire-Rat); 803 or 422 or −350

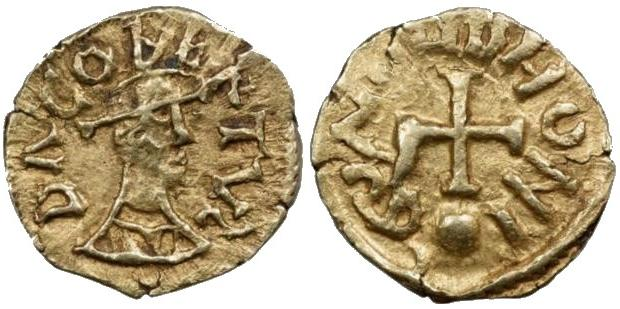
King Dagobert II of Austrasia (c. 650–679)

Year 676 (DCLXXVI) was a leap year starting on Tuesday of the Julian calendar. The denomination 676 for this year has been used since the early medieval period, when the Anno Domini calendar era became the prevalent method in Europe for naming years.

== Events ==
=== By place ===
==== Byzantine Empire ====
- Summer – Siege of Constantinople: Caliph Muawiyah I sends his son Yazid with Muslim reinforcements to Constantinople. At the same time, the Byzantines have to face a Slavic attack on Thessaloniki and Lombard attacks in Italy.

==== Europe ====
- Dagobert II, son of the late king Sigibert III, becomes (partly with the help of Bishop Wilfrid) the new ruler of Austrasia, after his predecessor Clovis III is murdered.

==== Britain ====
- King Æthelred of Mercia invades Kent, in an attempt to enforce overlordship and diminish Kentish influence in Surrey and London. His armies destroy the Diocese of Rochester (seat of the bishops in West Kent), and ravage the surrounding countryside.
- King Æscwine of Wessex dies after a 2-year reign, and is succeeded by Centwine, son of the late king Cynegils. He reasserts the power of his Anglo-Saxon kingdom over the Welsh.

==== Asia ====
- Emperor Tenmu of Japan promulgates a decree about taxes from fiefs, and the employment of persons for the service from the outer provinces. Men of distinguished ability are allowed to enter the service, even though they are of the common people, regardless of their ranks.
- The broad-based peninsular effort under Silla's leadership, to prevent Chinese domination of Korea, succeeds in forcing Chinese troops to withdraw into Manchuria, in northeast China.

=== By topic ===
==== Religion ====
- Aldhelm, Anglo-Saxon scholar-poet, founds Malmesbury Abbey on the site of the hermitage of his old tutor Máel Dub.
- Æthelred of Mercia founds the monastery at Breedon on the Hill on the site of The Bulwarks, an Iron Age hill fort.
- June 17 – Pope Adeodatus II dies at Rome after a reign of 4 years. He is succeeded by Donus as the 78th pope.
- Cuthbert of Lindisfarne retires to a hermitage near Holburn, at a place now known as St. Cuthbert's Cave.

== Births ==
- January 28 – Toneri, Japanese prince (d. 735)
- John of Damascus, Syrian monk and priest (approximate date)
- Muhammad al-Baqir, fifth Shia Imam (approximate date; d. 733)

== Deaths ==
- June 17 – Pope Adeodatus II
- Æscwine, king of Wessex
- Clovis III, king of Austrasia
- Le Yanwei, chancellor of the Tang dynasty
- Mangsong Mangtsen, emperor of Tibet
- Wang Bo, Chinese poet
