= Merovingian dynasty =

Ruling family of the Franks (c. 481–751)

Merovingian Kingdoms
- c. 481–751
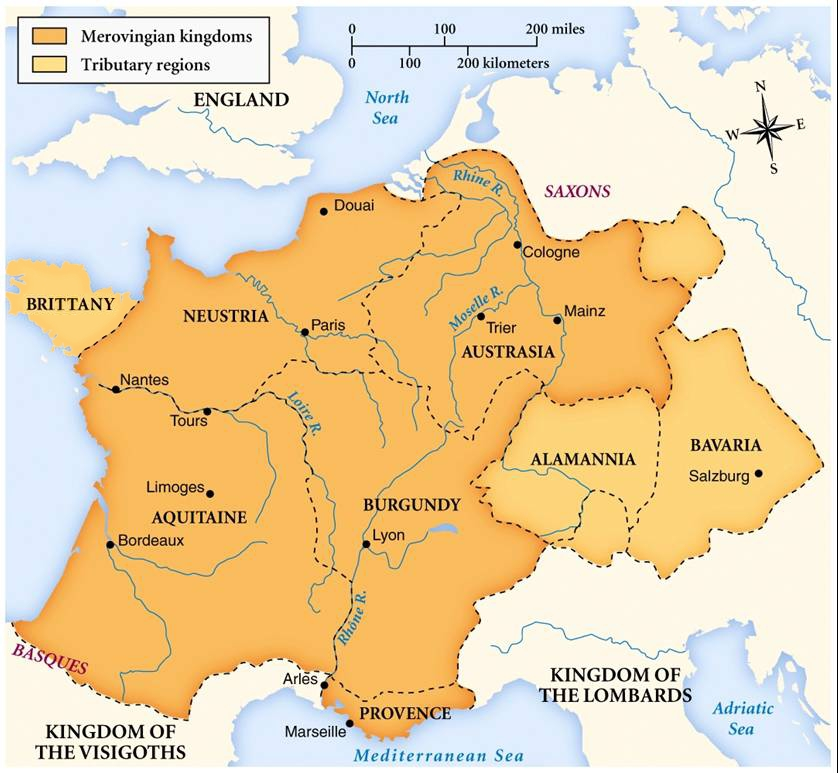
- History
  - Established: c. 481
  - Disestablished: 751

The Merovingian dynasty (/ˌmɛrəˈvɪndʒiən/) was the ruling family of the Franks from around the middle of the 5th century until Pepin the Short in 751. They first appear as "Kings of the Franks" in the Roman army of northern Gaul. By 509 they had united all the Franks and northern Gallo-Romans under their rule. They conquered most of Gaul, defeating the Visigoths (507) and the Burgundians (534), and also extended their rule into Raetia (537). In Germania, the Alemanni, Bavarii and Saxons accepted their lordship. The Merovingian realm was the largest and most powerful of the states of Western Europe following the breakup of the empire of Theodoric the Great.

The dynastic name, medieval Latin Merovingi or Merohingii ("sons of Merovech") derives from Salian King Merovech, the father of Childeric I.

Unlike the Anglo-Saxon royal genealogies, the Merovingians never claimed descent from a god, nor is there evidence that they were regarded as sacred.

The Merovingians' long hair distinguished them from other Franks, who commonly cut their hair short. Later authors referred to the early 5th century Frankish kings as the "long-haired kings" (Latin reges criniti), and the Merovingians continued that tradition. A Merovingian whose hair was cut could not rule, and a rival could be removed from the succession by being tonsured and sent to a monastery. The Merovingians also used a distinct name stock. One of their names, Clovis, evolved into Louis and remained common among French royalty down to the 19th century.

The first well-known Merovingian king was Childeric I (died 481). His son Clovis I (died 511) converted to Nicene Christianity, united the Franks and conquered most of Gaul. The Merovingians treated their kingdom as single yet divisible. Clovis's four sons divided the kingdom among themselves, and it remained divided until 679 with the exception of four short periods (558–561, 613–623, 629–634, 673–675). After that it was divided again only once (717–718). The main divisions of the kingdom were Austrasia, Neustria, Burgundy and Aquitaine.

During the final century of Merovingian rule, the kings were increasingly pushed into a ceremonial role. Actual power was increasingly in the hands of the mayor of the palace, the highest-ranking official under the king. In 656, the mayor Grimoald I tried to place his son Childebert on the throne in Austrasia. Grimoald was arrested and executed; but his son ruled until 661, when the Merovingian dynasty was restored. When King Theuderic IV died in 737, the mayor Charles Martel continued to rule the kingdoms until his death in 741. The dynasty was restored again in 743, but in 751 Charles's son, Pepin the Short, deposed the last king, Childeric III, and had himself crowned, initiating the Carolingian dynasty.

== Name ==
The Latin name of the Merovingians derives from an unattested Frankish form, akin to the attested Old English Merewīowing,

The final -ing is a typical Germanic patronymic suffix. It can be used to mean "people of -, followers of -, family of -, dwellers at -", especially in Old English. For example, Havering, London, is 'people of a man called Hæfer', and Honing, Norfolk is 'dwellers at the rock'.

== Legendary origins ==
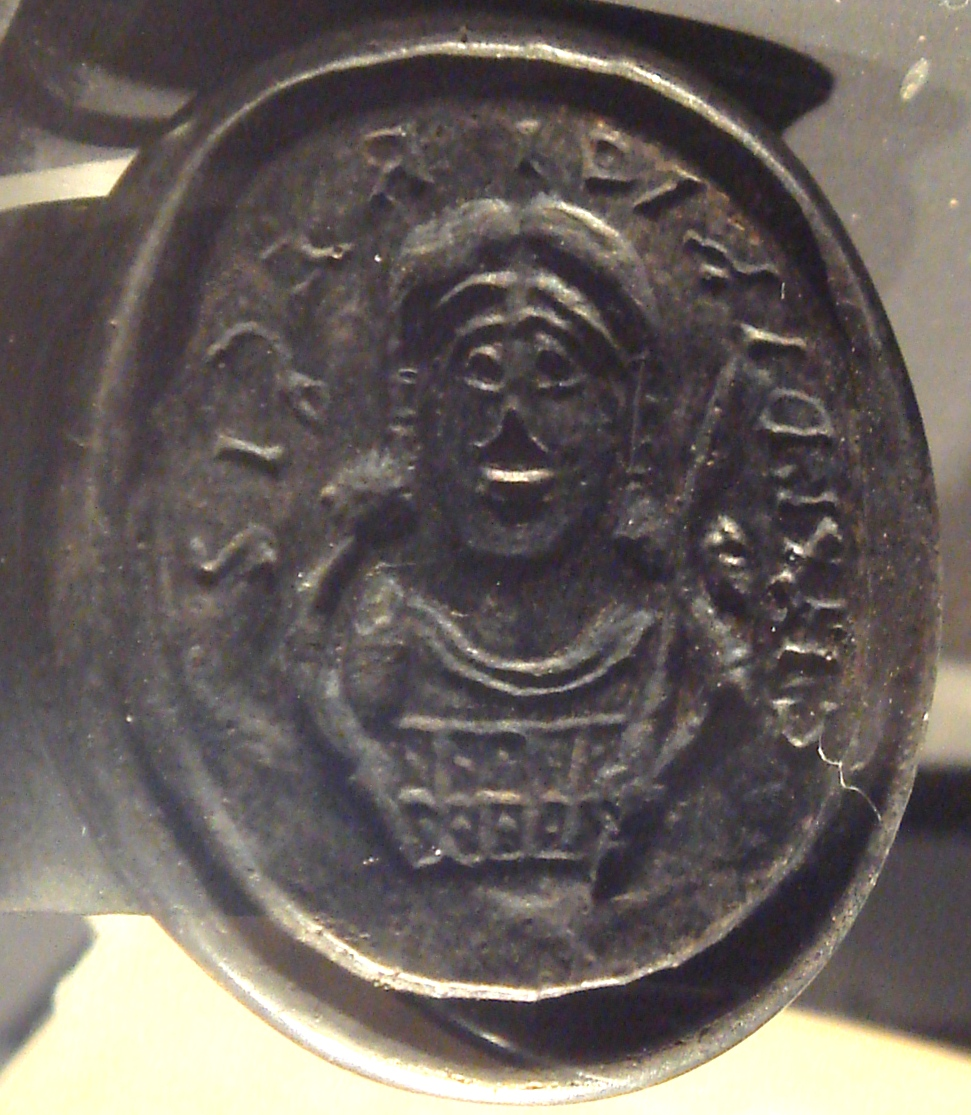
Signet ring of Childeric I. Monnaie de Paris.

The 7th-century Chronicle of Fredegar implies that the Merovingians were descended from a sea-beast called a quinotaur:

It is said that while Chlodio was staying at the seaside with his wife one summer, his wife went into the sea at midday to bathe, and a beast of Neptune rather like a Quinotaur found her. In the event she was made pregnant, either by the beast or by her husband, and she gave birth to a son called Merovech, from whom the kings of the Franks have subsequently been called Merovingians.

In the past, this tale was regarded as an authentic piece of Germanic mythology and was often taken as evidence that the Merovingian kingship was sacral and the royal dynasty of supernatural origin. Today, it is more commonly seen as an attempt to explain the meaning of the name Merovech (sea-bull): "Unlike the Anglo-Saxon rulers the Merovingians—if they ever themselves acknowledged the quinotaur tale, which is by no means certain—made no claim to be descended from a god".

In 1906, the British Egyptologist Flinders Petrie suggested that the Marvingi recorded by Ptolemy as living near the Rhine were the ancestors of the Merovingian dynasty.

== History ==
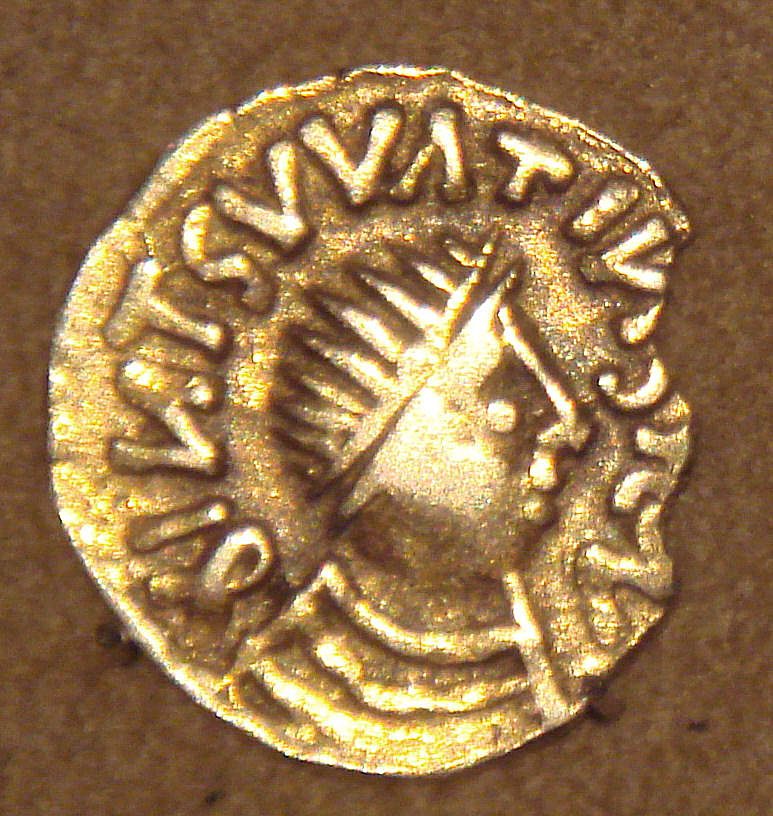
Frankish gold tremissis, imitation of Byzantine tremissis, mid-6th century.

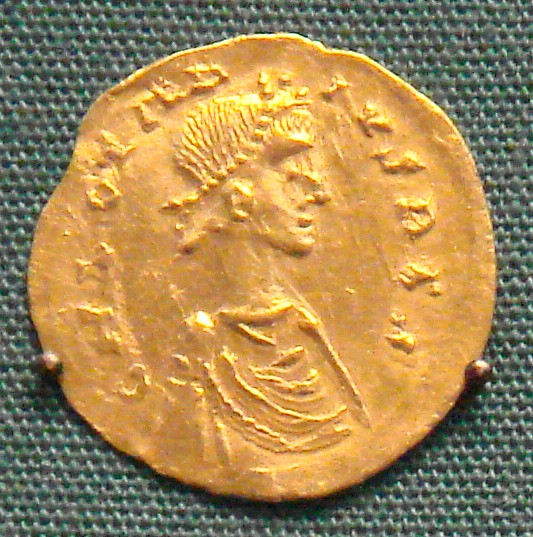
Coin of Clotaire II, 584–628. British Museum.

In 486 Clovis I, the son of Childeric, defeated Syagrius, a Roman military leader who competed with the Merovingians for power in northern France, in the Franco-Roman War of 486. After this war he won the Battle of Tolbiac against the Alemanni in 496, according to Gregory of Tours, Clovis adopted his wife Clotilda's Orthodox—i.e., Nicene—Christian faith at a time when other Germanic tribes were largely Arian. He subsequently went on to decisively defeat the Visigothic kingdom of Toulouse in the Battle of Vouillé in 507. After Clovis's death, his kingdom was partitioned among his four sons. This tradition of partition continued over the next century. Even when several Merovingian kings simultaneously ruled their own realms, the kingdom—not unlike the late Roman Empire—was conceived of as a single entity ruled collectively by these several kings (each ruling one section much as the late Roman Empire had been divided between up to four emperors). The death of one or more of these kings could result in the reunification of the whole kingdom under a single ruler. Even when divided under different kings, the kingdom maintained unity and conquered Burgundy in 534.

Upon Clovis's death in 511, the Merovingian kingdom included all of Gaul except Burgundy and all of Germania magna except Saxony. After the fall of the Ostrogoths, the Franks also conquered Provence. After this their borders with Italy (ruled by the Lombards since 568) and Visigothic Septimania remained fairly stable.

=== Division of the kingdom ===
Internally, the kingdom was divided among Clovis's sons and later among his grandsons and frequently saw war between the different kings, who allied amongst themselves and against one another. The death of one king created conflict between the surviving brothers and the deceased's sons, with differing outcomes. Later, conflicts were intensified by the personal feud around Brunhilda. However, yearly warfare often did not constitute general devastation but took on an almost ritual character, with established 'rules' and norms.

=== Reunification of the kingdom ===
Eventually, Clotaire II in 613 reunited the entire Frankish realm under one ruler.

The frequent wars had weakened royal power, while the aristocracy had made great gains and procured enormous concessions from the kings in return for their support. These concessions saw the very considerable power of the king parcelled out and retained by leading comites and duces (counts and dukes). Very little is in fact known about the course of the 7th century due to a scarcity of sources, but Merovingians remained in power until the 8th century.

=== Weakening of the kingdom ===
Clotaire's son Dagobert I (died 639), who sent troops to Spain and pagan Slavic territories in the east, is commonly seen as the last powerful Merovingian King. Later kings are known as rois fainéants ("do-nothing kings"), despite the fact that only the last two kings did nothing. The kings, even strong-willed men like Dagobert II and Chilperic II, were not the main agents of political conflicts, leaving this role to their mayors of the palace, who increasingly substituted their own interest for their king's. Many kings came to the throne at a young age and died in the prime of life, weakening royal power further.

=== Return to power ===
The conflict between mayors was ended when the Austrasians under Pepin the Middle triumphed in 687 in the Battle of Tertry. After this, Pepin, though not a king, was the political ruler of the Frankish kingdom and left this position as a heritage to his sons. It was now the sons of the mayor that divided the realm among each other under the rule of a single king.

After Pepin's long rule, his son Charles Martel assumed power, fighting against nobles and his own stepmother. His reputation for ruthlessness further undermined the king's position. Under Charles Martel's leadership, the Franks defeated the Moors at the Battle of Tours in 732. After the victory of 718 of the Bulgarian Khan Tervel and the Emperor of Byzantium Leo III the Isaurian over the Arabs led by Maslama ibn Abd al-Malik prevented the attempts of Islam to expand into eastern Europe, the victory of Charles Martel at Tours limited its expansion onto the west of the European continent. During the last years of his life, he even ruled without a king, though he did not assume royal dignity. His sons Carloman and Pepin again appointed a Merovingian figurehead (Childeric III) to stem rebellion on the kingdom's periphery. However, in 751, Pepin finally displaced the last Merovingian and, with the support of the nobility and the blessing of Pope Zachary, became one of the Frankish kings.

== Government ==
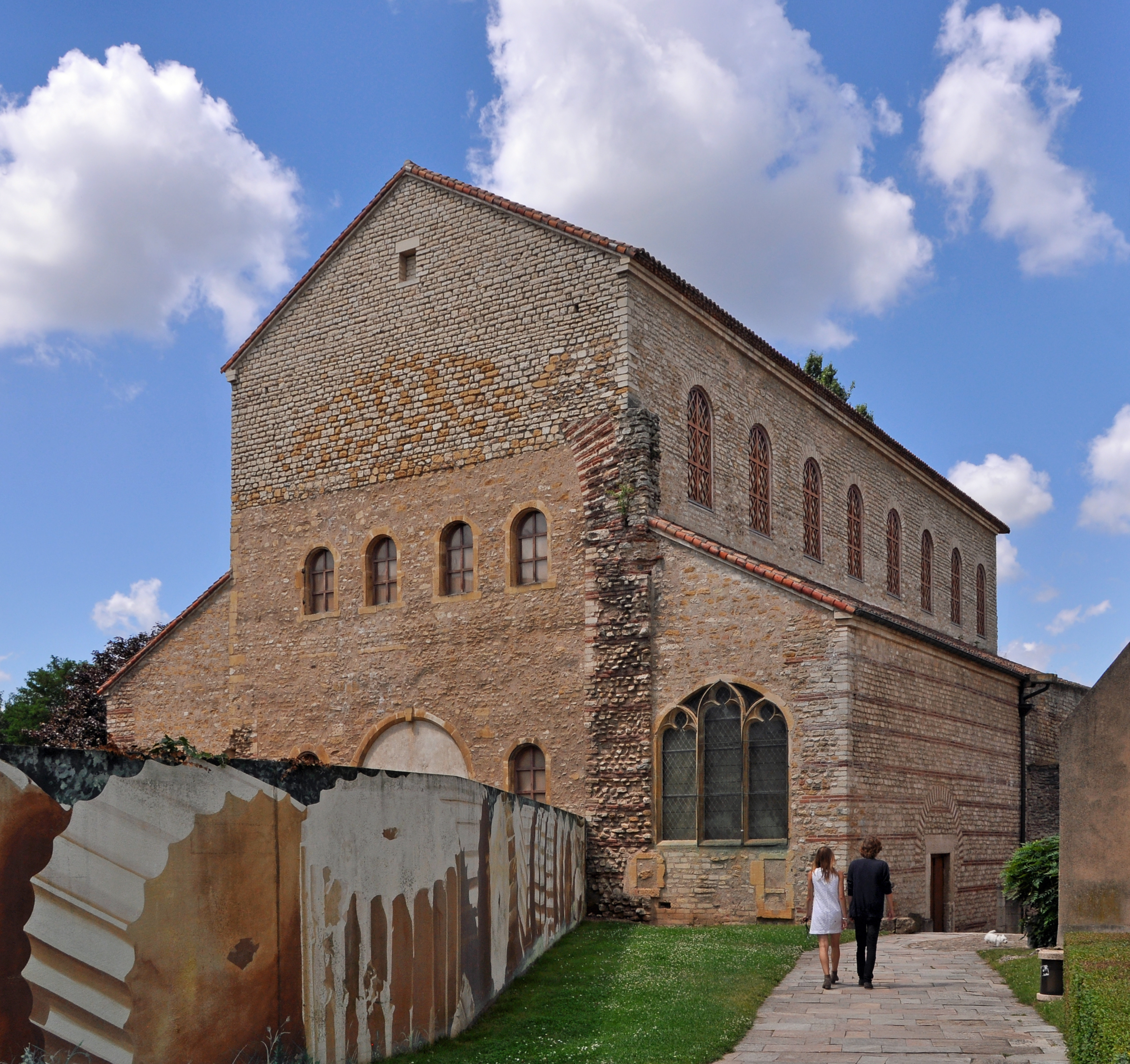
The Merovingian Basilica of Saint-Pierre-aux-Nonnains in Metz, capital of Austrasia

The Merovingian king redistributed conquered wealth among his followers, both material wealth and the land (including its indentured peasantry), though these powers were not absolute. As Rouche points out, "When he died his property was divided equally among his heirs as though it were private property: the kingdom was a form of patrimony." Some scholars have attributed this to the Merovingians' lacking a sense of res publica, but other historians have criticized this view as an oversimplification.

The kings appointed magnates to be comites (counts), charging them with defense, administration, and the judgment of disputes. This happened against the backdrop of a newly isolated Europe without its Roman systems of taxation and bureaucracy, the Franks having taken over administration as they gradually penetrated into the thoroughly Romanised west and south of Gaul. By the time of Dagobert I, governmental documents were recognizably Roman, it is by then written in Latin on imported papyrus similar to Roman bureaucratic norms and where it also made use of the old legal formulae. While laymen made up most of the administrators, there was a gradual shift to a clerical presence from the reign of Clotaire II.

The counts had to provide armies, enlisting their milites and endowing them with land in return. These armies were subject to the king's call for military support. Annual national assemblies of the nobles and their armed retainers decided major policies of war making. The army also acclaimed new kings by raising them on its shields continuing an ancient practice that made the king leader of the warrior-band. Furthermore, the king was expected to support himself with the products of his private domain (royal demesne), which was called the fisc. This system developed in time into feudalism, and expectations of royal self-sufficiency lasted until the Hundred Years' War.

Trade declined with the fall of the Roman Empire, and agricultural estates were mostly self-sufficient. The remaining international trade was dominated by Middle Eastern merchants, often Jewish Radhanites.

=== Law ===
Merovingian law was not universal law equally applicable to all; it was applied to each man according to his origin: Ripuarian Franks were subject to their own Lex Ripuaria, codified at a late date, while the so-called Lex Salica (Salic Law) of the Salian clans, first tentatively codified in 511 was invoked under medieval exigencies as late as the Valois era. In this the Franks lagged behind the Burgundians and the Visigoths, that they had no universal Roman-based law. In Merovingian times, law was handled by officials called rachimburgs, who memorised the set of legal precedents which formed the basis for their society's laws, for Merovingian society did not allow the concept of creating new law, only of maintaining tradition. Nor did its Germanic traditions offer any code of civil law required of urbanised society, such as Justinian I caused to be assembled and promulgated in the Byzantine Empire. The few surviving Merovingian edicts are almost entirely concerned with settling divisions of estates among heirs.

=== Coinage ===
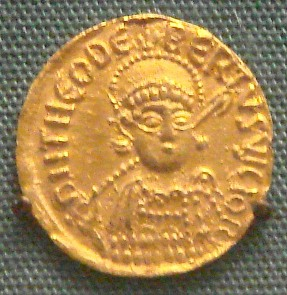
Coin of Theudebert I, 534–548

Byzantine coinage was in use in Francia before Theudebert I began minting his own money at the start of his reign. He was the first to issue distinctly Merovingian coinage. On gold coins struck in his royal workshop, Theudebert is shown in the pearl-studded regalia of the Byzantine emperor; Childebert I is shown in profile in the ancient style, wearing a toga and a diadem. The solidus and triens were minted in Francia between 534 and 679. The denarius (or denier) appeared later, in the name of Childeric II and various non-royals around 673–675. A Carolingian denarius replaced the Merovingian one, and the Frisian penning, in Gaul from 755 to the 11th century.

Merovingian coins are on display at the Monnaie de Paris in Paris; there are Merovingian gold coins at the Bibliothèque Nationale, Cabinet des Médailles.

== Religion ==
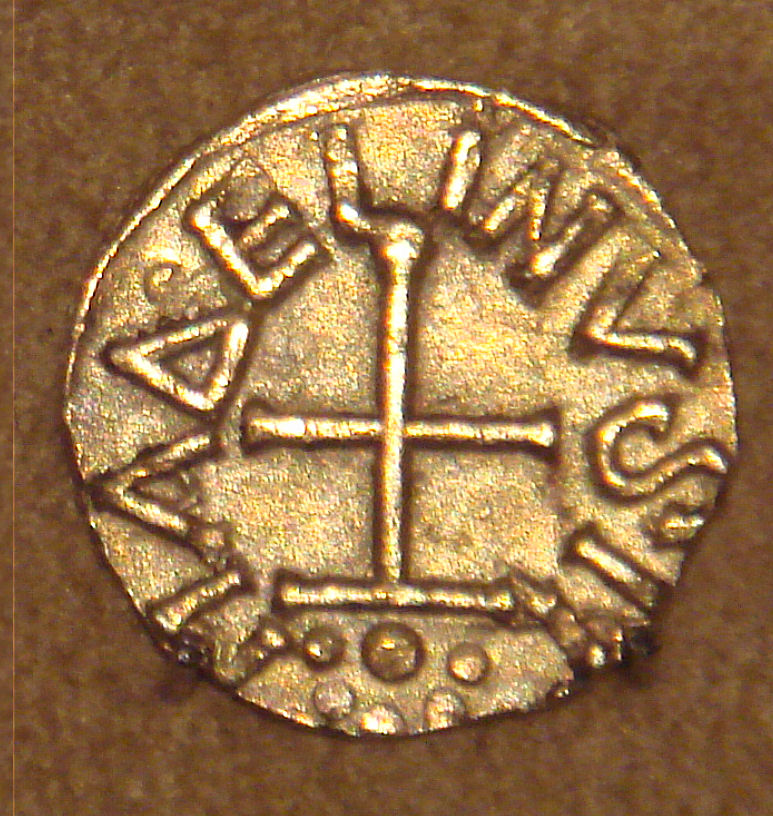
Frankish gold tremissis with Christian cross, issued by minter Madelinus, Dorestad, Netherlands, mid-7th century

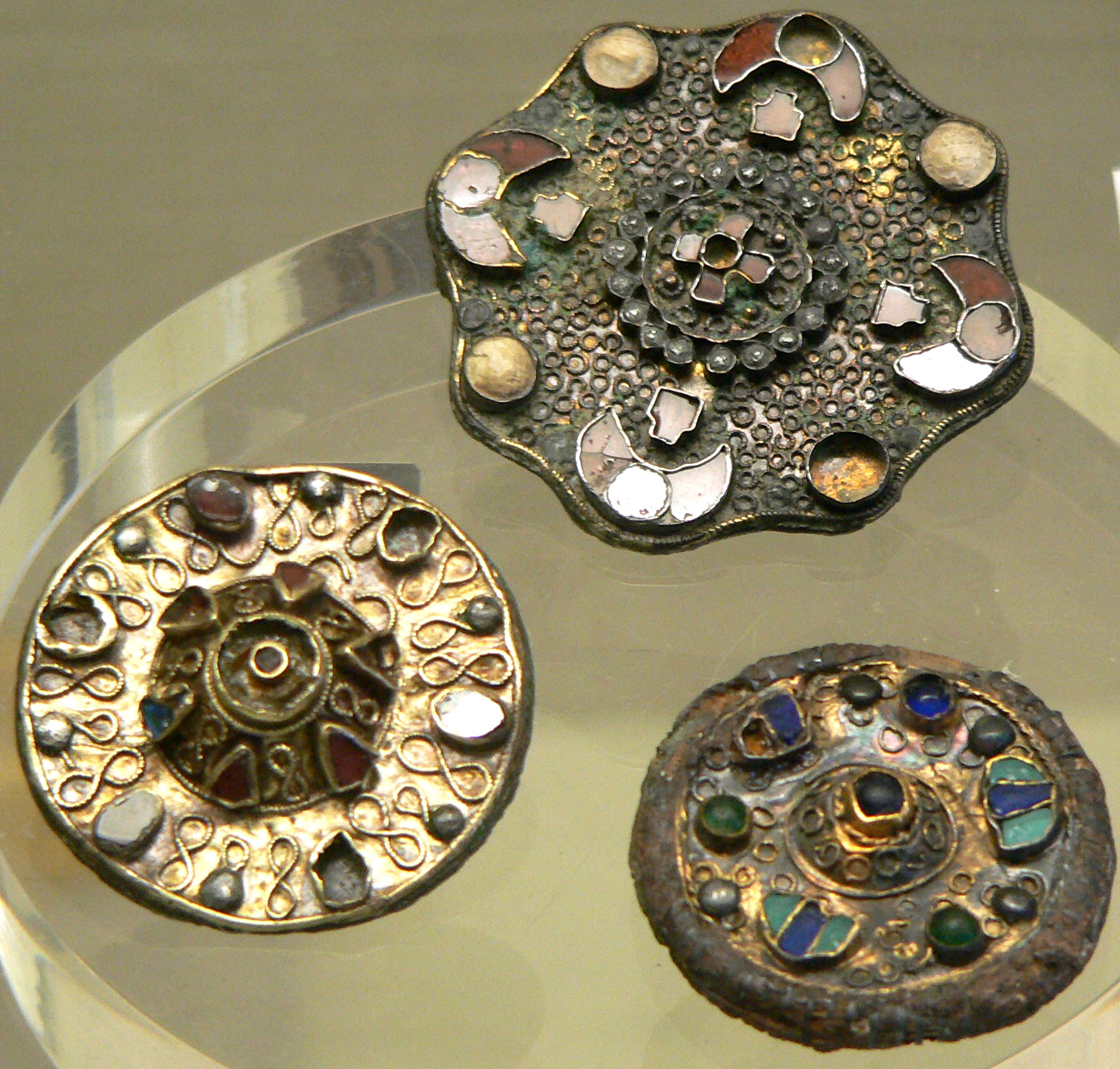
Merovingian fibulae. Cabinet des Médailles

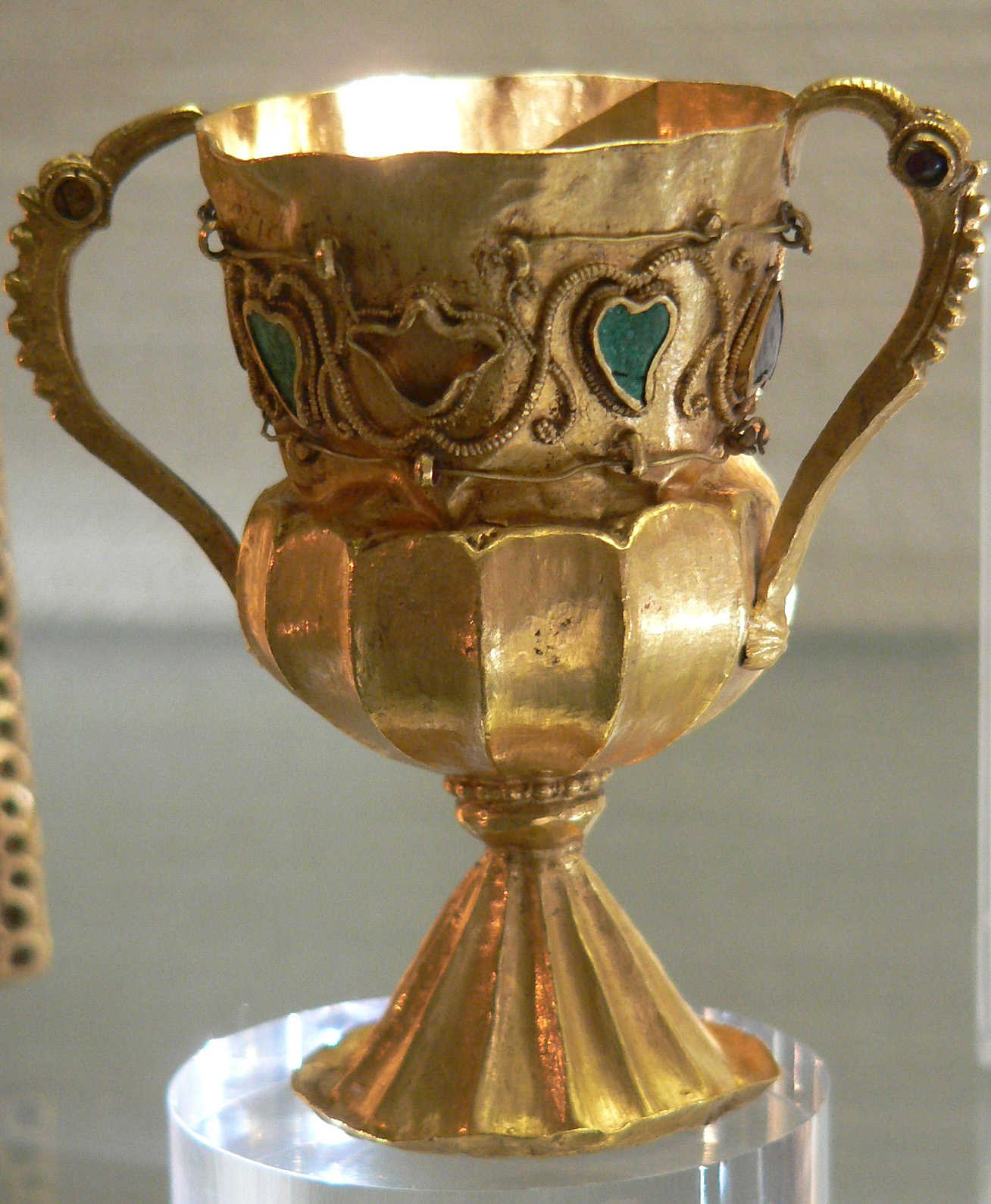
A gold chalice from the Treasure of Gourdon

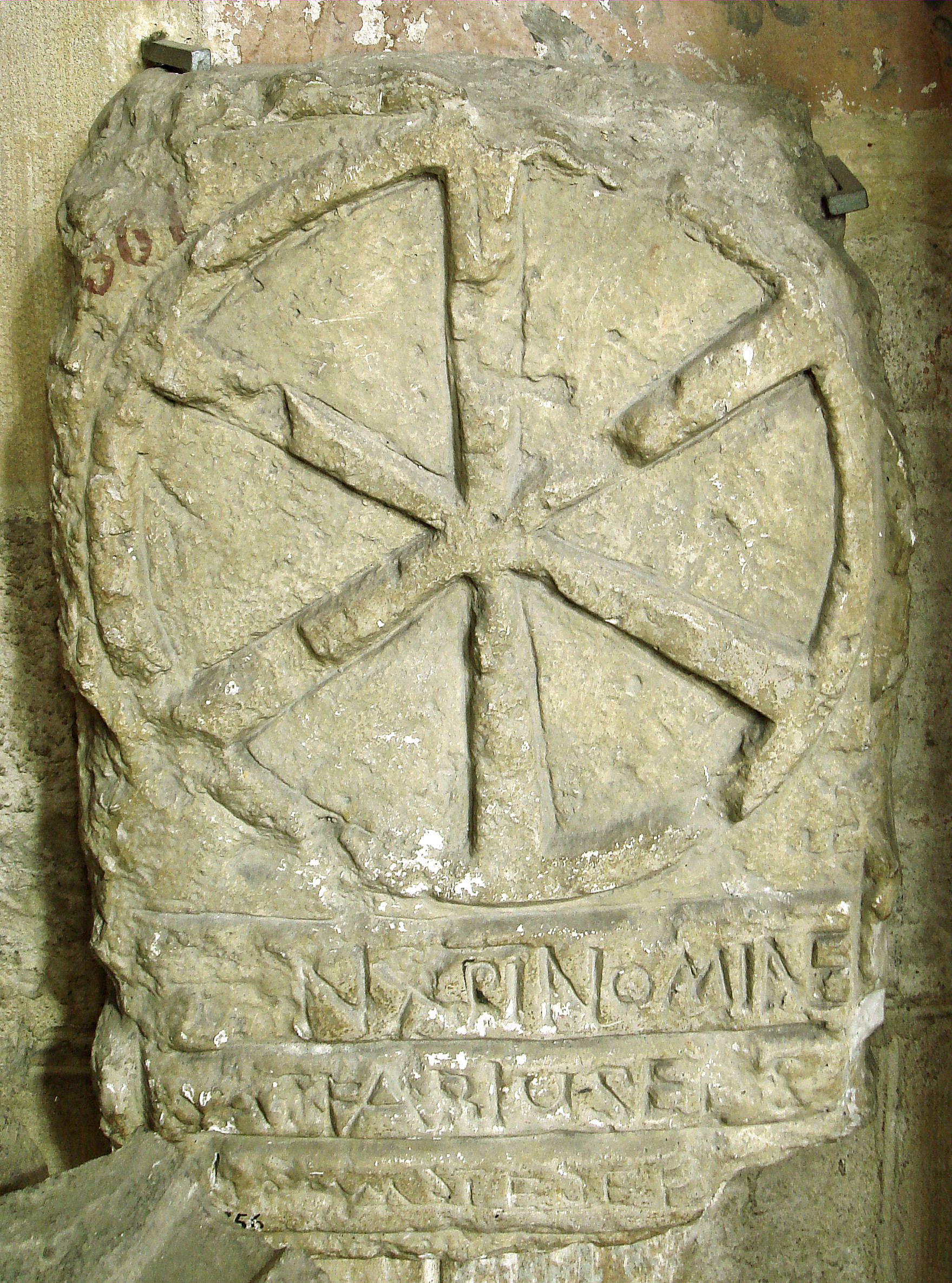
Cover of Merovingian sarcophagus with Christian IX monogram, Musée de Saint-Germain-en-Laye

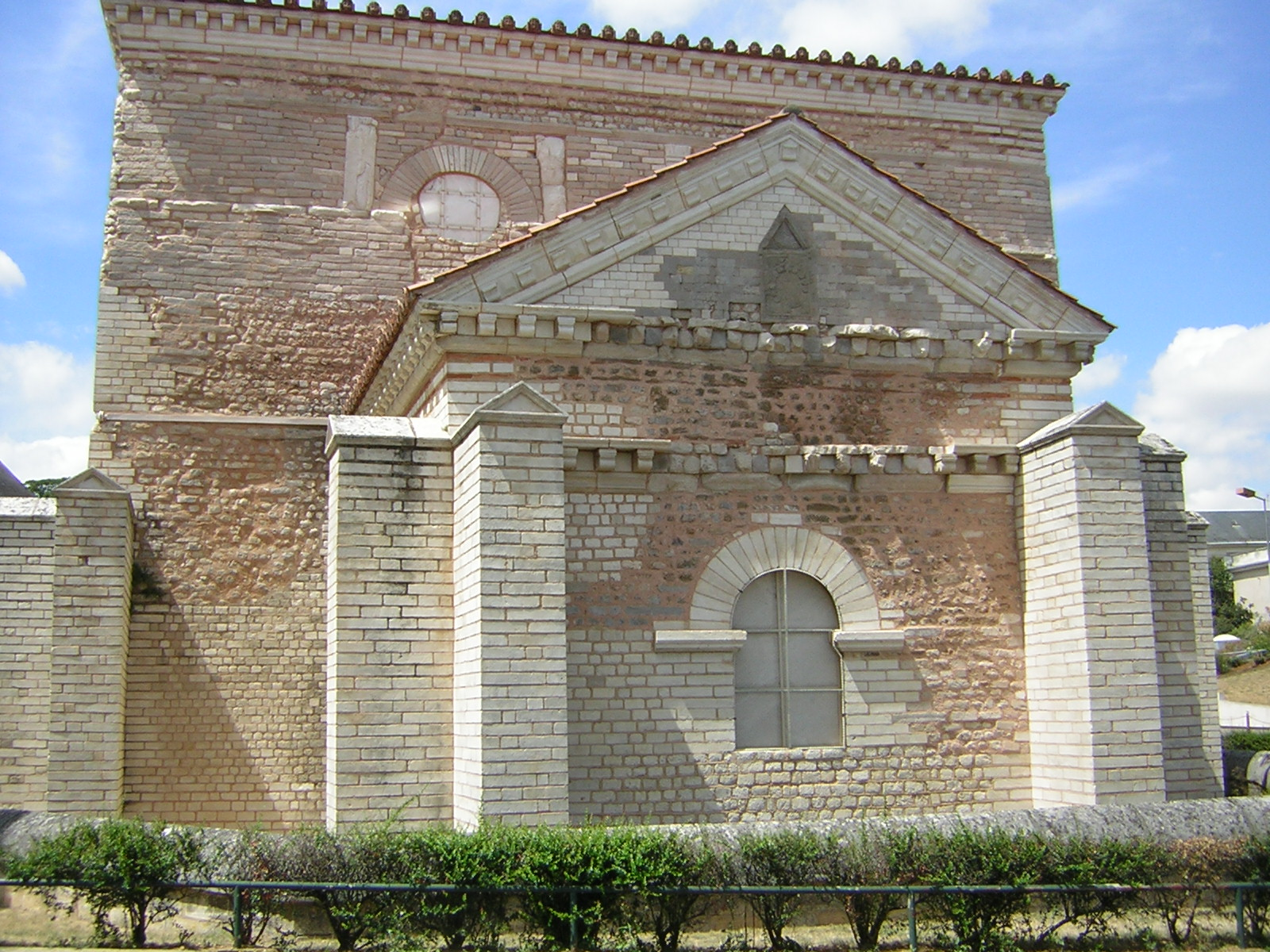
Baptistry of St. Jean, Poitiers

Christianity was introduced to the Franks by their contact with Gallo-Romanic culture and later further spread by monks. The most famous of these missionaries is St. Columbanus (d 615), an Irish monk. Merovingian kings and queens used the newly forming ecclesiastical power structure to their advantage. Monasteries and episcopal seats were shrewdly awarded to elites who supported the dynasty. Extensive parcels of land were donated to monasteries to exempt those lands from royal taxation and to preserve them within the family. The family maintained dominance over the monastery by appointing family members as abbots. Extra sons and daughters who could not be married off were sent to monasteries so that they would not threaten the inheritance of older Merovingian children. This pragmatic use of monasteries ensured close ties between elites and monastic properties.

Numerous Merovingians who served as bishops and abbots, or who generously funded abbeys and monasteries, were rewarded with sainthood. The outstanding handful of Frankish saints who were not of the Merovingian kinship nor the family alliances that provided Merovingian counts and dukes, deserve a closer inspection for that fact alone: like Gregory of Tours, they were almost without exception from the Gallo-Roman aristocracy in regions south and west of Merovingian control. The most characteristic form of Merovingian literature is represented by the Lives of the saints. Merovingian hagiography did not set out to reconstruct a biography in the Roman or the modern sense, but to attract and hold popular devotion by the formulas of elaborate literary exercises, through which the Frankish Church channeled popular piety within orthodox channels, defined the nature of sanctity and retained some control over the posthumous cults that developed spontaneously at burial sites, where the life-force of the saint lingered, to do good for the votary.

The vitae et miracula, for impressive miracles were an essential element of Merovingian hagiography, were read aloud on saints' feast days. Many Merovingian saints, and the majority of female saints, were local ones, venerated only within strictly circumscribed regions; their cults were revived in the High Middle Ages, when the population of women in religious orders increased enormously. Judith Oliver noted five Merovingian female saints in the diocese of Liège who appeared in a long list of saints in the late 13th-century Lardanchet psalter–hours. The vitae of six late Merovingian saints that illustrate the political history of the era have been translated and edited by Paul Fouracre and Richard A. Gerberding, and presented with Liber Historiae Francorum, to provide some historical context.

== Significant individuals ==
=== Queens and abbesses ===
- Genovefa (died 502)
- Clothilde, queen of the Franks (died 545)
- Monegund (died 544)
- Radegund, Thuringian princess who founded a monastery at Poitiers (died 587)
- Rusticula, abbess of Arles (died 632)
- Caesaria II, abbess of St Jean of Arles (died c. 550)
- Brunhilda, queen of Austrasia (died 613)
- Fredegund, queen of Neustria (died 597)
- Glodesind, abbess in Metz (died c. 600)
- Burgundofara, abbess of Moutiers (died 645)
- Sadalberga, abbess of Laon (died 670)
- Rictrude, founding abbess of Marchiennes (died 688)
- Itta, founding abbess of Nivelles (died 652)
- Begga, abbess of Andenne (died 693)
- Gertrude of Nivelles, abbess of Nivelles (died 658) presented in The Life of St. Geretrude (in Fouracre and Gerberding 1996)
- Aldegonde, abbess of Mauberges (died c. 684)
- Waltrude, abbess of Mons (died c. 688)
- Balthild, queen of the Franks (died c. 680), presented in The Life of Lady Bathild, Queen of the Franks (in Fouracre and Gerberding 1996)
- Eustadiola (died 684)
- Bertilla, abbess of Chelles (died c. 700)
- Anstrude, abbess of Laon (died before 709)
- Austreberta, abbess of Pavilly (died 703)

== Language ==
Yitzhak Hen stated that it seems certain that the Gallo-Roman population was far greater than the Frankish population in Merovingian Gaul, especially in regions south of the Seine, with most of the Frankish settlements being located along the Lower and Middle Rhine. The further south in Gaul one traveled, the weaker the Frankish influence became. Hen finds hardly any evidence for Frankish settlements south of the Loire. The absence of Frankish literature sources suggests that the Frankish language was forgotten rather rapidly after the early stage of the dynasty. Hen believes that for Neustria, Burgundy and Aquitaine, Vulgar Latin remained the spoken language in Gaul throughout the Merovingian period and remained so even well in to the Carolingian period. However, Urban T. Holmes estimated that a Germanic language was spoken as a second tongue by public officials in western Austrasia and Neustria as late as the 850s, and that it completely disappeared as a spoken language from these regions only during the 10th century.

== Historiography and sources ==
A limited number of contemporary sources describe the history of the Merovingian Franks, but those that survive cover the entire period from Clovis's succession to Childeric's deposition. First among chroniclers of the age is the canonised bishop of Tours, Gregory of Tours. His Decem Libri Historiarum is a primary source for the reigns of the sons of Clotaire II and their descendants until Gregory's own death in 594, but must be read with account of the pro-church point of view of its author.

The next major source, far less organised than Gregory's work, is the Chronicle of Fredegar, begun by Fredegar but continued by unknown authors. It covers the period from 584 to 641, though its continuators, under Carolingian patronage, extended it to 768, after the close of the Merovingian era. It is the only primary narrative source for much of its period. The only other major contemporary source is the Liber Historiae Francorum, an anonymous adaptation of Gregory's work apparently ignorant of Fredegar's chronicle: its author(s) ends with a reference to Theuderic IV's sixth year, which would be 727. It was widely read; though it was undoubtedly a piece of Arnulfing work, and its biases cause it to mislead (for instance, concerning the two decades between the controversies surrounding mayors Grimoald the Elder and Ebroin: 652–673).

Aside from these chronicles, the only surviving reservoirs of historiography are documentary sources (letters, charters, laws, etc.) and hagiography. Clerical men such as Gregory and Sulpitius the Pious were letter-writers, though relatively few letters survive. Edicts, grants, and judicial decisions survive, as well as the famous Lex Salica, mentioned above. From the reign of Clotaire II and Dagobert I survive many examples of the royal position as the supreme justice and final arbiter. There also survive biographies of saints of the period, for instance Saint Eligius and Leodegar, written soon after their subjects' deaths.

Finally, archaeological evidence cannot be ignored as a source for information, at the very least, on the Frankish mode of life. Among the greatest discoveries of lost objects was the 1653 accidental uncovering of Childeric I's tomb in the church of Saint Brice in Tournai. The grave objects included a golden bull's head and the famous golden insects (perhaps bees, cicadas, aphids, or flies) on which Napoleon modelled his coronation cloak. In 1957, the sepulchre of a Merovingian woman at the time believed to be Clotaire I's second wife, Aregund, was discovered in Saint Denis Basilica in Paris. The funerary clothing and jewellery were reasonably well-preserved, giving us a look into the costume of the time. Beyond these royal individuals, the Merovingian period is associated with the archaeological Reihengräber culture.

== Family tree ==
Merovingian dynasty

Gunther; King of Burgundy r.?–437	Chlodio ≈392/395– 445/448
? ? ?
Chilperic I King of Burgundy r.≈ 473–480	Gondioc; King of Burgundy ?–473 ?437–473	? Merovech ?–453/457
? ? ?
Chilperic II; King of Burgundy ≈450–493 r.473–493	Bisinus; King of Thuringia fl.≈460–506/510	Basina of Thuringia; 438–477	Childeric I King of the Salian Franks; 440–481/482 r.457–481/482	Godegisel ?–500? r.473–500	Godomar ?–? r.473–486	Gundobad; King of the Burgundians ≈452–516 r.473–516
Albofledis; 470–≈500	Lantechild; 468–?	Clotilde; 475–545	Clovis I King of the Franks; 466–511 r.509–511	? Evochildis of Cologne	Alaric II; King of the Visigoths ≈458/466–507 r.484–507	Audofleda	Theoderic; King of the Ostrogoths; 454–526 r.474–526	Sigismund; King of the Burgundians ?–≈524 r.516–523
Bertachar; King of Thuringia ≈485–530? r.≈500–529?	Baderic; King of Thuringia ≈480–529	Ingomer; 494	Clotilde ≈500–531	Amalaric; King of the Visigoths; 502–531 r.511–531	Eustere; 494?–521	Theuderic I King of Metz; 485–533/4 r.511–533/4	Suavegothe of Burgundy; 495/96–?
Radegund ≈520–587	Aregund ≈515/520–580	Chlothar I King of the Franks; 497–561 r.511–561	Ingund b.≈499	Guntheuc; 495–≈532	Chlodomer; King of Orléans ≈495–524	Childebert I King of Paris ≈496–558 r.511–558	Ultragotha; 510; 566/567	Theudebert I King of Rheims ≈500–547/548 r.534–547/548
Fredegund ≈545–597	Chilperic I King of Neustria ≈539–584 r.561–584	Audovera; ~530–580	Charibert I King of Paris ≈517–567 r.561–567	Ingoburga ≈539–589	Guntram; King of Burgundy ≈532–592 r.561–592	Chlothsind	Alboin; King of the Lombards; 530s–572 r.≈560/565–572	Theudebald; King of Rheims ≈535–555 r.548–555
Theudebert I of Soissons	Basina; ~560–620	Bertha of Kent ≈565– ~601	Æthelberht; King of Kent ≈560–616 r.≈590–616	Sigebert I King of Austrasia ≈535–≈575 r.561–≈575	Brunhilda of Austrasia ≈543–613
Rigunth ≈569– _{after}589	Haldetrude ≈575–604	Chlothar II; King of the Franks; 584–629 r.613–629	Sichilde ≈590–627	Ingund; 568/567–585	Hermenegild; 564–585	Childebert II; King of Austrasia; 570–595 r.575–595
Ragnetrude	Dagobert I King of the Franks ≈603–639 r.629–639	Nanthild ≈610–642	Charibert II; King of Aquitaine; 607/617–632 r.629–632	Arnulf; Bishop of Metz ≈582–640	Pepin of Landen; Mayor of Austrasia ≈580–640 r.639–640	Theudebert II; King of Austrasia; 586–612 r.595–612	Theuderic II; King of Burgundy; 587–613 r.595–613
Chimnechild of Burgundy	Sigebert III; King of Austrasia ≈630–656 r.634–656	Clovis II; King of Neustria and Burgundy; 637–657 r.639–657	Balthild of Ascania; ~626/627–680	Chilperic; King of Aquitaine; 630s–632 r.632	Ansegisel ≈602/610– bef.679/662	Begga; 615–693	Grimoald I the Elder; Mayor of Austrasia; 616–657 r.643–656	Sigebert II; King of Austrasia and Burgundy; 602–613 r.613
Dagobert II; King of Austrasia ≈650–679 r.676–679	Bilichild; 654–675	Childeric II; King of the Franks ≈653–675 r.662–675	Chlothar III; King of the Franks; 652–673 r.657–673	Theuderic III; King of the Franks; 654–691 r.673–691	Clotilda	Pepin of Herstal; Mayor of Austrasia ≈635–714 r.680–714	Childebert the Adopted; King of Austrasia r.656–662
? ? ?
Chilperic II; King of the Franks ≈672–721 r.715–721	Clovis III; King of Austrasia r.675–676	Childebert III; King of the Franks; 670/683–711 r.695–711	Clovis IV; King of the Franks; 682–695 r.691–695	Charles; Martel; Mayor of Austrasia ≈686/680–741 r.717–741	Grimoald II the Younger; Mayor of Neustria ≈680–714 r.695–714
? ? ?	Carolingian dynasty
Chlothar IV; King of Austrasia ?–719 r.717–718	Dagobert III; King of the Franks; 699–715 r.711–715	Theudoald; Mayor of Austrasia; 707/708–741 r.714-716
? ? ?
Childeric III; King of the Franks ≈717–754 r.743–751	Theuderic IV; King of the Franks ≈712–737 r.721–737

== In popular culture ==
The Merovingians play a prominent role in French historiography and national identity, although their importance was partly overshadowed by that of the Gauls during the Third Republic. Charles de Gaulle is on record as stating his opinion that "For me, the history of France begins with Clovis, elected as king of France by the tribe of the Franks, who gave their name to France. Before Clovis, we have Gallo-Roman and Gaulish prehistory. The decisive element, for me, is that Clovis was the first king to have been baptized a Christian. My country is a Christian country and I reckon the history of France beginning with the accession of a Christian king who bore the name of the Franks".

The Merovingians feature in the novel In Search of Lost Time by Marcel Proust: "The Merovingians are important to Proust because, as the oldest French dynasty, they are the most romantic and their descendants the most aristocratic." The word "Merovingian" is used as an adjective at least five times in The Way By Swann’s.

Heimito von Doderer describes a fictitious Merowingian noble family in the 20th century in his grotesque 1962 novel The Merowingians or The Total Family.

The Merovingians are featured in the book The Holy Blood and the Holy Grail (1982) where they are depicted as descendants of Jesus, inspired by the "Priory of Sion" story developed by Pierre Plantard in the 1960s. Plantard playfully sold the story as non-fiction, giving rise to a number of works of pseudohistory among which The Holy Blood and the Holy Grail was the most successful. The "Priory of Sion" material has given rise to later works in popular fiction, notably The Da Vinci Code (2003), which mentions the Merovingians in chapter 60.

The title of "Merovingian" (also known as "the Frenchman") is used as the name for a fictional character and a supporting antagonist of the films The Matrix Reloaded, The Matrix Revolutions and The Matrix Resurrections.

== See also ==
- List of Frankish kings
- Merovingian art and architecture
- Merovingian script
- Pillar of Yzeures-sur-Creuse
- Chateau de Reuilly
