= Sigebert III =

King of Austrasia from 633 to 656

- Sigebert III's signet ring

King of Austrasia
- Reign: 633–656
- Predecessor: Dagobert I
- Successor: Childebert the Adopted
- Mayor of the Palace: Grimoald the Elder
- Born: 630
- Died: c. 656 (aged 25–26); Metz
- Burial: Nancy Cathedral
- Spouse: Chimnechild
- Issue: Dagobert II; Bilichild; Childebert (adoptive)
- Dynasty: Merovingian
- Father: Dagobert I
- Mother: Ragnétrude
- Religion: Chalcedonian Christianity (Sanctified)

Saint Sigebert III
- Born: 630
- Died: c. 656
- Venerated in: Roman Catholic Church; Eastern Orthodox Church
- Feast: February 1

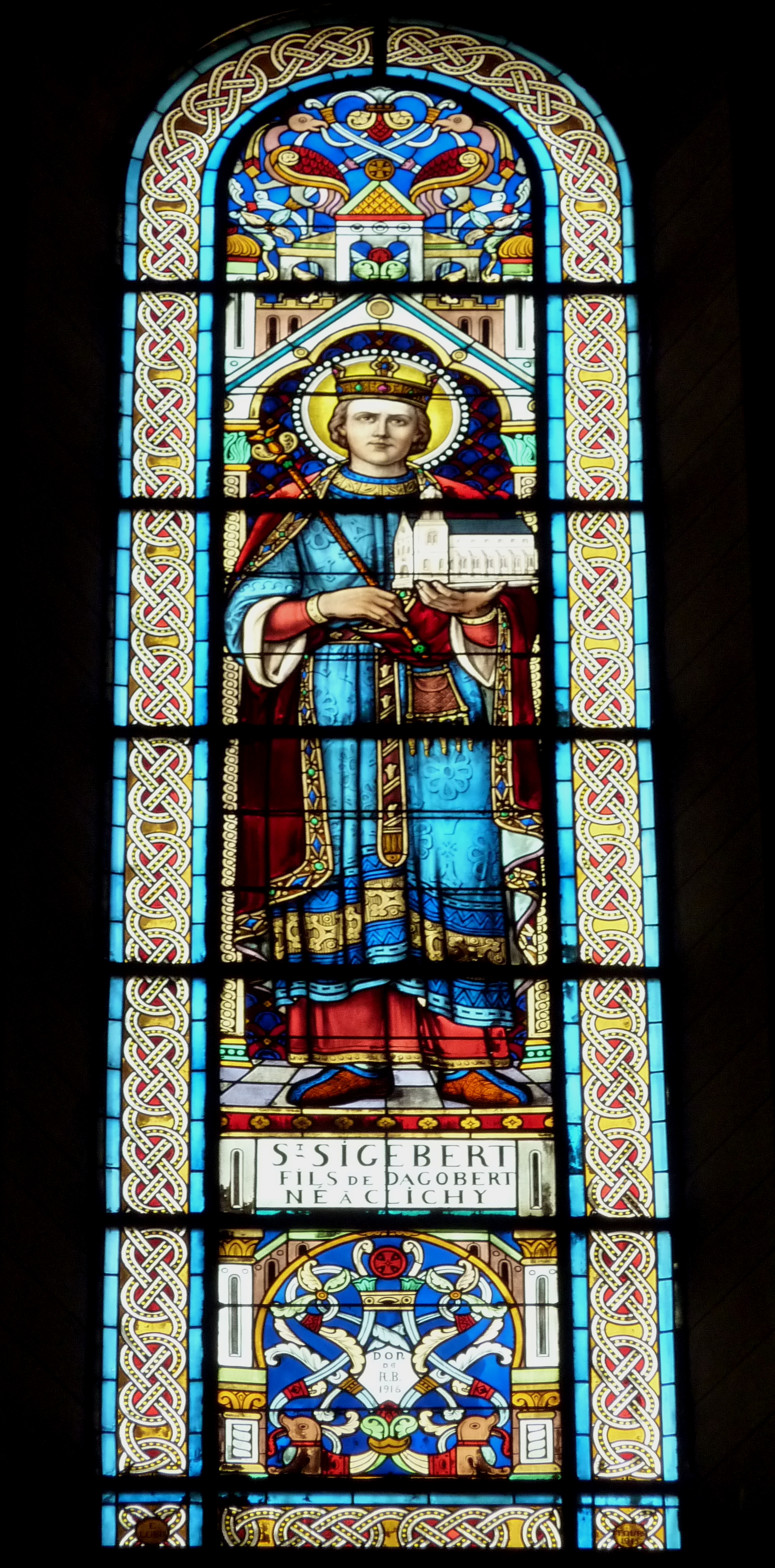
Sigebert depicted on stained glass window

Sigebert III (c. 630–656) was the Merovingian king of Austrasia from 633 to his death around 656. He was described as the first Merovingian roi fainéant, or "do-nothing king", with the mayor of the palace in fact ruling the kingdom throughout his reign. Nevertheless, Sigebert lived a pious Christian life and was later sanctified, being remembered as Saint Sigebert of Austrasia in the Roman Catholic Church and Eastern Orthodox Church.

== Life ==
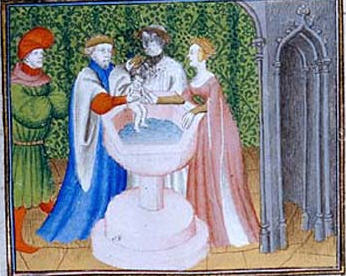
Baptism of Sigebert. His mother is near him.

Sigebert was born in 630 as the eldest son of Dagobert I, King of the Franks, and his concubine Ragnetrude. The king recalled and made peace with Saint Amand, who was previously banished for criticizing the king's vices, and asked him to baptize his new-born son. The ceremony was performed at Orléans and Charibert II, Dagobert's half-brother who was King of Aquitaine at the time, was the god-father. Dagobert assigned the education of Sigebert to Pepin of Landen, who was the mayor of the palace in Austrasia under his father Chlotar II, until 629. Pepin took the young Sigebert and moved with him to his domains in Aquitane, where they stayed the next three years.

In 633, a revolt of the nobles forced Dagobert to make the three-year old Sigebert king of Austrasia, similar to how his father Chlotar II had made him king of Austrasia in 623. However, he refused to give the power to Pepin of Landen by making him mayor of the palace for the child-king. Instead he had put Sigebert under the tutelage of Adalgisel as mayor of the palace and the Bishop of Cologne Saint Cunibert as regent, while keeping Pepin in Neustria as hostage. In 634 Dagobert's second son, Clovis II, was born, and the king forced the nobles to accept him as the next king of Neustria and Burgundy, setting up a new division of the empire.

On the death of Dagobert in 639, the two Frankish kingdoms became independent once again under Sigebert III and Clovis II. Both kingdoms were under child-kings – Sigebert was around eleven years old and Clovis was five – and were ruled by the respective regents. It was under Sigebert's reign that the mayor of the palace began to play the most important role in the political life of Austrasia, and he has been described as the first roi fainéant—do-nothing king—of the Merovingian dynasty. Pepin replaced Adalgisel as mayor of the palace of Austrasia in 639 but died the following year, in 640, and was replaced by his son Grimoald. In 640 the Duchy of Thuringia rebelled against Austrasia in the only war of Sigebert's reign. Grimoald allowed the young king to stand at the head of the army trying to quell the rebellion, but was defeated by Duke Radulph. The Chronicle of Fredegar records that the rout left Sigebert weeping in his saddle.

Though ineffective as a king, Sigebert had become a pious adult under the tutelage of Pepin and later Saint Cunibert and lived a life of Christian virtue. He used his wealth to establish numerous monasteries, hospitals, and churches, including the monastery of Stavelot-Malmedy.

Sigebert III died of natural causes on 1 February 656 at age 25. He was buried in the Abbey of Saint Martin near Metz which he had founded. In 1063 his body, found incorrupt, was taken out of the tomb and moved to the side of the altar. The abbey was demolished in 1552 and the relics were moved to the Nancy Cathedral. Sigebert III is revered as a saint by the Catholic Church with his feast day on 1 February. He is the patron saint of Nancy.

== Marriage and succession ==
The Mayor of the Palace Grimoald managed to convince the young Sigebert, who was childless at the time, to adopt as his heir Grimoald's son Childebert the Adopted. However, the king married Chimnechild of Burgundy and had a son of his own, the future king Dagobert II. He also had a daughter, Bilichild, the future Queen of Neustria and Burgundy.

In 656, after the death of Sigebert, Grimoald attempted to usurp the throne of Austrasia and had the young Dagobert (who was seven years old at the time) tonsured and sent to a monastery in Ireland. Grimoald's son Childebert was proclaimed King of Austrasia in 656, but the reign was short-lived as he was deposed after seven months in 657 and both he and his father were killed in a revolt.

Austrasia next passed under the rule of the children of Sigebert's brother Clovis II for a period. Chlothar III, the elder son of Clovis II, became the king of Austrasia in 657. The next year, in 658, he also became King of Neustria and Burgundy upon the death of his father, thus temporarily reuniting the Frankish kingdoms under one rule. A few years later however, the Austrasian nobility again pressed successfully for the kingdoms to be separated. As a result, Childeric II, the younger brother of Chlotar III, became king of Austrasia from 662 to his death in 675. The nobles had put on the throne Clovis III, about whom not much is known, but his reign was short. One year later, in 676, Dagobert II, Siegbert's son, was recalled from Ireland and took his father's throne after approximately 20 years in exile.

== Sources ==
- R. P. Vincent, Histoire fidelle de st Sigisbert: XII roy d'Austrasie et III du nom; avec un abrégé de la vie du roy Dagobert, son fils: le tout tiré des antiquités austrasiennes

Sigebert III Merovingian dynasty Born: 630 Died: 7th century
Preceded by Dagobert I	King of Austrasia; 634–656/660	Succeeded by Childebert the Adopted
