= Dagobert II =

Frankish king in Austrasia from 675/6 to 679

- King of the Franks
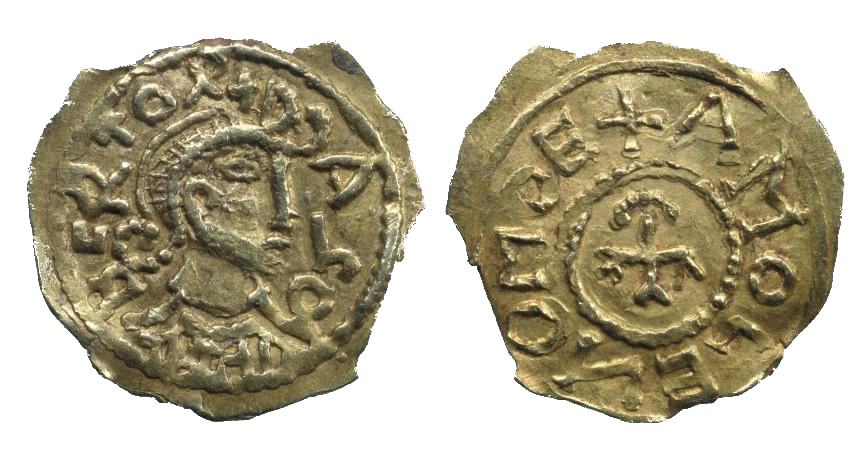
- A gold tremissis of Dagobert II

King in Austrasia
- Reign: 675/6–679
- Predecessor: Clovis III
- Successor: Theuderic III
- Died: 679; Mouzay
- Issue: Adela; Irmina (uncertain)
- Father: Sigebert III
- Mother: Chimnechild

Saint Dagobert II
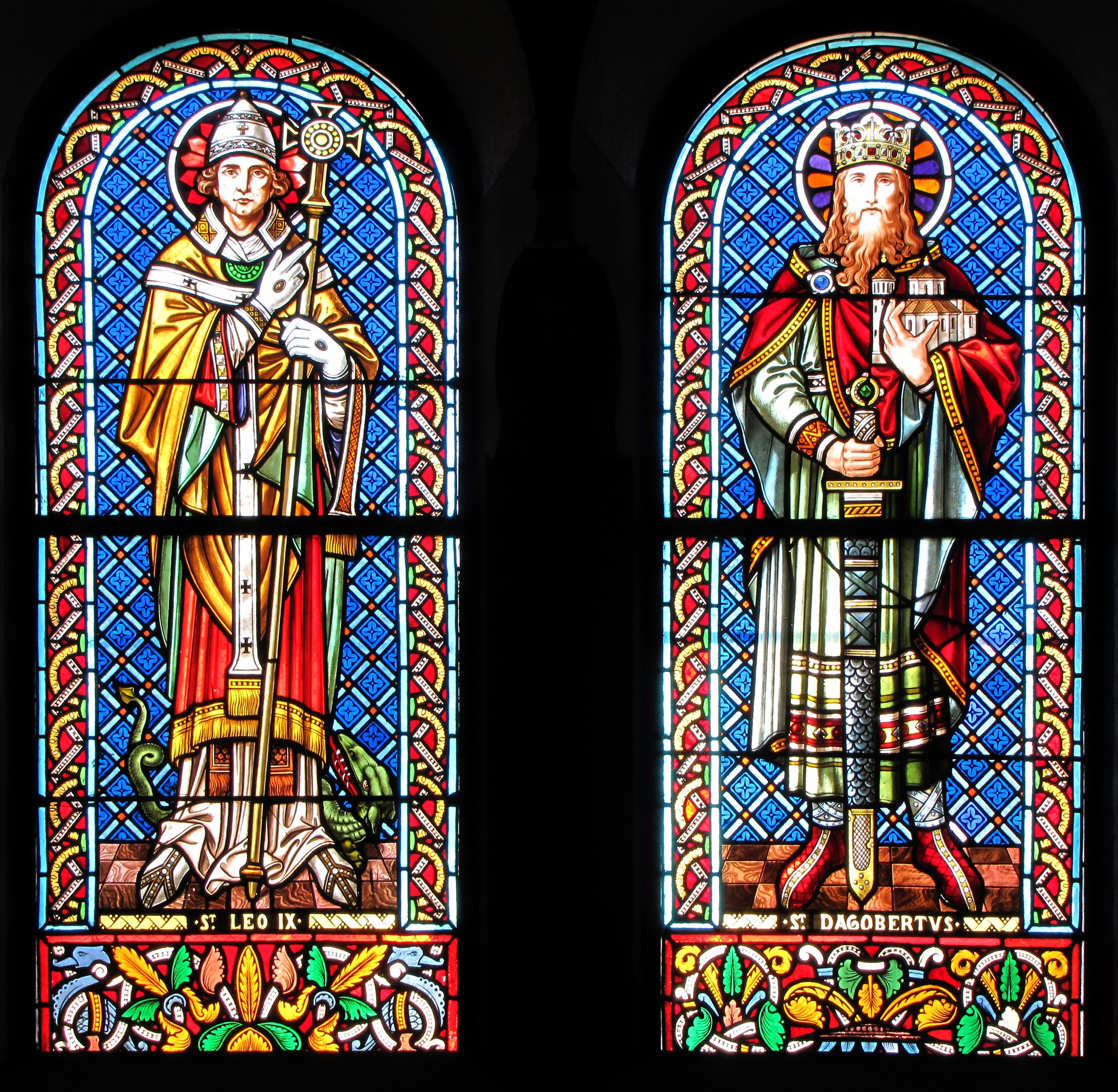
- Neo-Romanesque stained-glass windows in the Saint-Léon Chapel in Eguisheim, depicting Saint Leo IX and Saint Dagobert II.
- Venerated in: Catholic Church
- Canonized: Pre-congregation
- Feast: December 23

Dagobert II (Latin: Dagober(c)tus; Old English: Dægberht; died 679) was a Merovingian king of the Franks, ruling in Austrasia from 675 or 676 until his death. He is one of the more obscure Merovingians. He has been considered a martyr since at least the ninth century.

None of the narrative histories of the Merovingian period give an account of Dagobert's reign, which has been reconstructed from several different sources. Upon the death of his father in 656, he was deprived of the succession and exiled to Ireland to live as a monk. His return to Austrasia was arranged by Wilfrid, bishop of York.

He ascended the throne during the civil war caused by the assassination of Childeric II in 675. During his brief reign, he was at war with Neustria, signed a peace treaty with the Lombard Kingdom in Italy and reintroduced gold coinage.

The near-contemporary Life of Wilfrid (Note: Absent the Life, "it is scarcely possible to know that Dagobert II ruled".) portrays Dagobert as a tyrant who antagonized the bishops and imposed new taxes. He was assassinated by a conspiracy of the highest nobility and was succeeded by his cousin, Theuderic III, king of Neustria, against whom he had previously warred.

== Exile ==
Dagobert was the son of Sigebert III (ruled 632–51/6) and an unknown woman. It is unlikely that he was a son of Sigebert's only known wife, Chimnechild, who survived him. He was thus the half-brother of Bilichild, Chimnechild's daughter by Sigebert. He was named for his grandfather, Dagobert I (623–639).

According to the Book of the History of the Franks, which dates to 727, after Sigebert's death, Grimoald, the mayor of the palace and the most powerful official under the king, arranged for Dagobert to be tonsured and placed in the custody of Dido, bishop of Poitiers. Tonsuring rendered Dagobert unfit for the throne since Merovingian kings always wore their hair long. Dido then sent Dagobert to Ireland. The dating of these events is uncertain. They are usually placed in 656, but a date as early as 651 has also been proposed.

No contemporary source describes Dagobert's time in Ireland. The eighteenth-century antiquary Mervyn Archdall was the first to record the association of Dagobert with a specific place in Ireland. He wrote that a local oral tradition current at that time put Dagobert in the monastery of Slane, a conclusion accepted by some modern scholars.

Grimoald placed his son, Childebert, on the Austrasian throne, but the Neustrians under Clovis II (639–657) had Grimoald arrested and brought to Paris, where he was executed "because he had acted against his lord", that is, the rightful Merovingian claimant. Clovis's second son, Childeric II, who was still a minor, was placed on the Austrasian throne in 662. He was married to Bilichild, Dagobert's half-sister, and placed under the regency of Chimnechild. He was assassinated, along with his queen and his son, in 675.

The murder of Childeric provided the occasion for Dagobert's return, but its immediate result was a civil war. The former mayor of the palace, Ebroin, declared a certain Clovis III, son of the Neustrian king Chlothar III (658–673), as king in Austrasia, while Clovis II's third son, Theuderic III, was placed on the Neustrian throne by Leodegar. After Leodegar's capture, Ebroin abandoned Clovis for Theuderic, and in so doing lost his Austrasian allies. In this situation, Dagobert was recalled from his Irish exile.

== Return from exile ==
While the Book of the History of the Franks is the only source to describe the circumstances of Dagobert's exile, the Life of Wilfrid is the only one to describe his return. This biography of the English bishop Wilfrid was composed in the first decades of the eighth century by Stephen of Ripon. (Note: The Life of Wilfrid uses the Anglo-Saxon spelling Dægberht for the king.) According to Stephen, Dagobert was exiled to Ireland "in his youth" and when his friends and relatives later learned that he was still living they asked Wilfrid to bring him to England and from there send him on to Austrasia.

The Life of Wilfrid does not specify who was responsible for recalling Dagobert, only that it was "friends" (amici) and "relatives" (proximi). The relatives may have been on his mother's side. There is little consensus on who the friends could have been, possibly Wulfoald, the mayor of the palace under Childeric II, or Pippin of Herstal and Martin, who came to power, according to the Book of the History of the Franks, after "the deaths of kings", perhaps in 675; or even Ultan, abbot of Saint-Maur-des-Fossés, who was Irish himself and had connections in Ireland.

The exact date of Dagobert's accession is not known. Childeric II was killed in 675 and Dagobert was on the throne by July 676.

== Reign ==
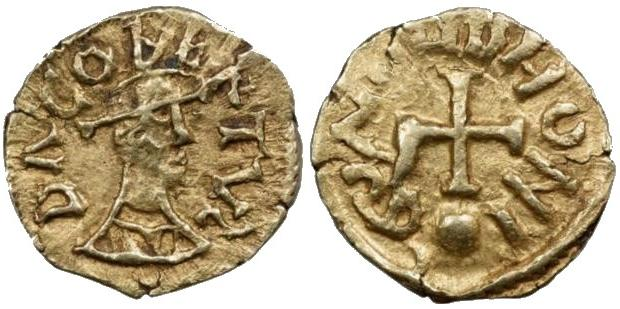
A gold tremissis of Dagobert II, showing a diademed bust of the king on the obverse and a cross surmounting a globe on the reverse.

Dagobert's reign is sparsely recorded. The Book of the History of the Franks, which has a Neustrian perspective, does not mention him again after describing his exile. The historian Richard Gerberding says of the History's author, "Either he did not believe that Dagobert had returned to become king or he did not want us to know of it". Paul Fouracre suggests that he did not regard Dagobert as a legitimate king, either because he had not been chosen with the support of the Neustrians; because he was considered a foreigner after his long exile; or because he was not considered throneworthy on account of the circumstances of his birth, his mother having been a concubine.

Only one seventh-century work from within the Merovingian kingdoms, the Life of Abbess Sadalberga of Laon, mentions the reign of Dagobert, and then only in passing. It records that Sadalberga moved her convent from the suburbs of Langres in northern Burgundy to the city of Laon because of forebodings, later proven true by "recent fighting between Kings Dagobert and Theuderic". This is the only mention of a war between Dagobert and his first cousin, Theuderic III of Neustria. It is an indication of the continuing animosity between Ebroin and the Austrasians, although it may have begun as a border dispute in the Champagne.

That the war was waged deep in Burgundy, which was under Neustrian rule, suggests that Dagobert for a time had the initiative. It may be during this war that Pippin and Martin launched the attack on Theuderic III that was defeated by Ebroin at the famous Battle of Lucofao, resulting in Martin's death. While this battle may have taken place after Dagobert's death, a more likely date is September 679, when Dagobert was still alive and able to issue orders for the raising of levies. The war mentioned in the Life of Sadalberga, however, cannot be dated precisely. It may have ended as early as September 677.

In 676, Dagobert signed a "most firm pact of peace" (Note: foedus ... pacis firmissimae) with the Lombards. This event can be dated precisely because the only source for it, the History of the Lombards written by Paul the Deacon towards the end of the eighth century, reports the appearance of a comet in August the same year. This comet was widely reported across the world from Ireland to Japan. Paul, however, mistakenly places the pact in the reign of the Lombard king Grimoald, who died in 671, before Dagobert had even returned from Ireland. The Lombard king at the time of the comet was actually Perctarit.

The only surviving authentic charter issued by Dagobert confirms the possessions of the monastery of Stavelot-Malmedy. In the charter, Dagobert refers to the donations made by his father, but does not mention that the monastery was founded by Grimoald, the man who had exiled him.

Dagobert reintroduced the minting of gold, which had apparently been suspended by Childeric II around 670. His gold tremissis broke with the old Frankish style and copied the cross potent on three steps of contemporary Byzantine solidi. Dagobert was also the last king in whose name coins were struck in Marseille. The important royal coinage of Marseille, lasting from 613 until 679, was always struck with the name of a king, which was unusual since Frankish coins typically contain only the names of the moneyer and the mint.

In 679, while on his way to Rome to attend a church council, Wilfrid stayed at the court of Dagobert, who was grateful to the bishop for having facilitated his return from Ireland. Dagobert offered to appoint Wilfrid to the diocese of Strasbourg, which the Life of Wilfrid calls the "chief bishopric of his realm", but Wilfrid declined. Dagobert provided him with arms and companions for the rest of his journey to Rome. In Italy, Wilfrid stayed for a time at the court of Dagobert's new ally, Perctarit.

In late 679, shortly after Wilfrid's visit, Dagobert was assassinated. The Life of Wilfrid claims that this was engineered by "treacherous dukes" with the consent of the bishops. According to a late tradition, he was killed by his own godson, John, while hunting in the Woëvre. (Note: From Ado's martyrology: Eodem die passio sancti Dagoberti regis Francorum, qui quadam die pergens venatum in saltu Wavrensi plenus Spiritu sancto in loco qui dicitur Scortias, tribus millibus distante a fisco Sataniaco, in quo ipse morabatur, a filiolo suo nomine Ioanne 10. Kal. Ianuar. martyrizatus est et ab angelis deporatus est ad societatem sanctorum martyrum.) The traditional date of his death, 23 December, is likewise based on late sources but widely accepted.

Following Dagobert's death, Ebroin managed to extend Theuderic III's authority over Austrasia. On Wilfrid's return trip through Austrasia in 680, he was arrested by Ebroin's men, who blamed him for having arranged Dagobert's return. According to the report in the Life of Wilfrid, Dagobert was a "destroyer of cities, despising the counsels of the magnates, reducing the people with taxation ... being contemptuous of God's churches and their bishops." It is possible that the reference to the destruction of cities refers to Dagobert's failure to protect them when Ebroin devastated the land after his victory at Lucofao.

== Martyr cult ==
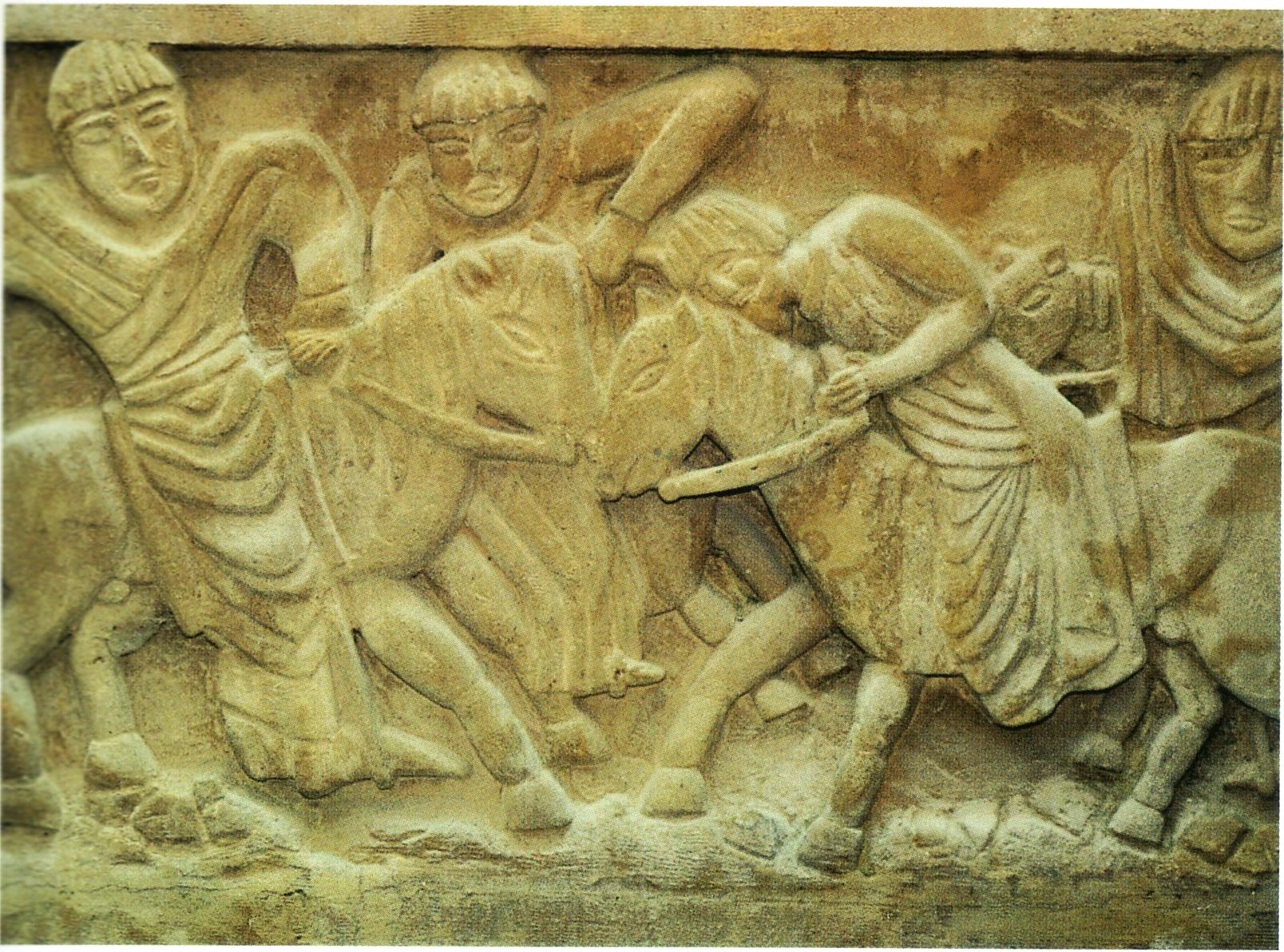
Carving depicting the murder of Dagobert from the crypt of the Basilica of Saint Dagobert in Stenay

The Life of Wilfrid is the only source to record Dagobert's assassination, but some corroboration comes from the fact that he was revered as a martyr in the Ardennes region before the end of the ninth century.

There are conflicting claims about where Dagobert was buried. According to the Life of Bishop Audoin of Rouen, written in the early eighth century, Dagobert was buried in the church of Saint Peter in Rouen alongside his predecessor, Childeric II, and Childeric's queen, Bilichild, and infant son, also named Dagobert. This source refers to the "Dagobert whom Grimoald tonsured" without mentioning his exile, return or reign.

The Life of Dagobert, on the other hand, says that Dagobert was buried at Stenay in the church dedicated to Saint Remigius. This is not implausible, since Stenay was in the centre of Austrasia. The source, however, dates to the 890s and confuses Dagobert II and Dagobert III (711–715), who died of illness.

On 10 September 872, the cult of Dagobert was brought to life (or revived) by Charles the Bald, king of West Francia (840–877), who had his relics translated to a specially built basilica in Stenay staffed with its own canons. The timing seems to indicate that Charles was trying to establish himself in that part of Lotharingia that he had only acquired in 870 by the Treaty of Meerssen. The translation of the relics is mentioned in the Life of Dagobert and in a charter preserved in the cartulary of the Abbey of Gorze, which provides the date.

The endowment of the Basilica of Saint Dagobert is known from a charter of 1124, also in the cartulary of Gorze. The endowment had passed at some point to Beatrice, wife of Godfrey III, Duke of Lower Lorraine, who in 1069 left it to the abbey of Gorze. The canons having grown lax, the monks turned it into a Benedictine priory.

Dagobert's feast day was 23 December. This day is given in the Life of Dagobert; in the now lost calendar of saints made for Emma, wife of King Lothair of France (954–986); and in the auctaria (local additions) to the Martyrology of Usuard from the area of modern Belgium. One auctarium, however, places his feast on 11 September. A Liège manuscript of the martyrology of Ado of Vienne also places Dagobert's death on 23 December.

Dagobert's festival was never widespread outside of Stenay. Generally, it became associated with places associated with Dagobert I. It was still being celebrated at Verdun as late as the sixteenth century. The prior of Stenay was suppressed in 1580 and in 1591 the buildings were sacked by Protestants.

An early reference to Dagobet's relics can be found in the charter granting the church at Stenay to Gorze in 1069. A charter of Bishop Lietbert from 1070 shows some of his relics deposited in the church of Saint-Ghislain. In 1570, there was an altar dedicated to Dagobert at Stenay, indicating that some relics were still there. These were dispersed after the Protestant sack. In 1609, the Abbey of Juvigny possessed a cervical vertebra and a femur supposedly of Dagobert. In 1608, the cult of Dagobert was restored at Stenay. In 1645, his humerus, sacrum and tibia were carried in procession in the town. The skull of Dagobert has been claimed by Saint Waltrude Collegiate Church since at least 1658. It was recently examined and, while the wound in the cranium is consistent with a medieval axe blow, the skull was carbon dated to the 13th century.

== Bibliography ==
- Beauthier, Jean-Pol; Dierkens, Alain; Polet, Caroline; Beauthier, François; Lefèvre, Philippe (2025). "Le crâne attribué au saint roi mérovingien Dagobert II: Étude historique et anthropologique". Archives of Legal Medicine. 16 (1).
- Carozzi, Claude (1984). "La vie de saint Dagobert de Stenay: histoire et hagiographie". Revue belge de Philologie et d'Histoire. 62 (2): 225–258. doi:10.3406/rbph.1984.3460.
- Dierkens, Alain (1984). "Note sur un passage de la Vita Dagoberti: Dagobert II et le domaine de Biesme" (PDF). Revue belge de Philologie et d'Histoire. 62 (2): 259–270. doi:10.3406/rbph.1984.3461.
- Folz, Robert (1963). "Tradition hagiographique et culte de saint Dagobert, roi des Francs". Le Moyen Âge. 4: 17–35.
- Fouracre, Paul J. (1981). The Career of Ebroin, Mayor of the Palace, c.657–680 (PhD diss.). University of London, King's College.
- Fouracre, Paul J. (2008). "Forgetting and Remembering Dagobert II: The English Connection". Frankland: The Franks and the World of the Early Middle Ages. Manchester: Manchester University Press. pp. 70–89.
- Fouracre, Paul J. (2018). Nicholson, Oliver (ed.). The Oxford Dictionary of Late Antiquity, Volume 1: A–I. Oxford: Oxford University Press. p. 450. ISBN 978-0-19-881624-9.
- Fouracre, Paul J.; Gerberding, Richard A., eds. (1996). Late Merovingian France: History and Hagiography, 640–720. Manchester: Manchester University Press.
- Geary, Patrick J. (1988). Before France and Germany: The Creation and Transformation of the Merovingian World. Oxford: Oxford University Press.
- Gerberding, Richard A. (1983). A Critical Study of the Liber historiae Francorum (Ph.D. dissertation). Oxford University.
- Gerberding, Richard A. (1987). The Rise of the Carolingians and the Liber Historiae Francorum. Oxford: Oxford University Press.
- Grierson, Philip; Blackburn, Mark (2007). Medieval European Coinage, Volume 1: The Early Middle Ages (5th–10th Centuries). Cambridge: Cambridge University Press.
- Hammer, Carl I. (2011). "'Holy Entrepreneur': Agilbert, a Merovingian Bishop between Ireland, England and Francia". Peritia. 22–23: 53–82. doi:10.1484/J.PERIT.1.103280.
- Hofman, Julia (2003). "The Marriage of Childeric II and Bilichild in the Context of the Grimoald Coup". Peritia. 17–18: 382–393. doi:10.1484/J.Peri.3.541.
- Kronk, Gary W. (1999). Cometography: A Catalog of Comets. Vol. 1: Ancient–1799. Cambridge: Cambridge University Press.
- Krusch, Bruno, ed. (1888). Vita Dagoberti III regis Francorum. MGH. Vol. Scriptores rerum Merovingicarum 2. Hanover.
- McNamara, Jo Ann; Halborg, John E.; Whatley, E. Gordon, eds. (1992). Sainted women of the Dark Ages. Durham, NC: Duke University Press.
- Pertz, Georg, ed. (1872). Diplomata regum Francorum e stirpe Merowingica. MGH. Vol. Diplomatum Imperii 1. Hanover.
- Peters, Ralf (1991). Die Entwicklung des Besitztums der Abtei Saint-Denis in merowingischer und karolingischer Zeit (Ph.D. dissertation) (in German). Heinrich-Heine-Universität Düsseldorf. ISBN 9783838685359.
- Picard, Jean-Michel (1991). "Church and Politics in the Seventh Century: The Irish Exile of King Dagobert II". In Jean-Michel Picard (ed.). Ireland and Northern France, AD 600–850. Dublin: Four Courts. pp. 27–52.
- Semmler, J. (1990). "Spätmerowingischer Herrscher: Theuderich III und Dagobert II". Deutsches Archiv für Erforschung des Mittelalters. 55: 1–28.
- Shippey, Tom (2005). "The Merov(ich)ingian Again: damnatio memoriae and the usus scholarum". In K. O'Brien O'Keeffe; Andy Orchard (eds.). Latin Learning and English Lore: Studies in Anglo-Saxon Literature for Michael Lapidge. Vol. 1. Toronto: University of Toronto Press. pp. 389–406.
- Tardif, Ernest Joseph (1899). Les chartes mérovingiennes de l'Abbaye de Noirmoutier avec une étude sur la chronologie du règne de Dagobert II. Paris: Larose.
- Wood, Ian N. (1994). The Merovingian Kingdoms, 450–751. Harlow: Longman.
- Wood, Ian N. (2003). "Deconstructing the Merovingian Family". In Richard Corradini; Maximilian Diesenberger; Helmut Reimitz (eds.). The Construction of Communities in the Early Middle Ages: Texts, Resources and Artefacts. Leiden: Brill. pp. 149–171. ISBN 9789004118621.

Dagobert II Merovingian dynasty
Preceded by Clovis III	King of the Franks in Austrasia; 675/6–679	Succeeded by Theuderic III
