= Chimnechild of Burgundy =

Queen of Austrasia

Queen of Austrasia
- Tenure: 647 - 656
- Died: af. 676
- Spouse: Sigebert III
- Issue: Bilichild; Dagobert II

Chimnechild of Burgundy (also Himnechildis lat. Chimnechildis) (7th-century – fl. 676) was a Frankish queen consort by marriage to king Sigebert III the King of Austrasia. She served as regent during the reign of Childeric II in 662-675.

== Early life ==
No contemporary documents mention her family origin, however, The Ebersheim Chronicle, written in the 12th century, states that the wife of Duke Adalric Ethic of Alsace, Bereswinde, was the niece of Saint Léger, Bishop of Autun, through her mother, herself the sister of a queen of the Franks. Since the marriage between Adalric and Bereswinde took place at the end of the first half of the 7th century, the queen of the Franks in question can only be Chimnechilde or Bathilde. As the latter is of Servian origin, it follows that Chimnechilde is the sister of Bereswinde and the niece of Saint Léger. This chronicle was, however, written five centuries after her lifetime, and is not always taken into account by historians.

Onomastic overlaps between the Etichonides, descended from Adalric Ethic and Bereswinde, and the Hugobertides, descended from the seneschal Hugobert, led Christian Settipani to think that Bereswinde and Hugobert may have been brothers. Their father would then be the son of a mayor of the palace of Austrasia named Hugh and documented contemporaneously in 616. While Settipani later revised his opinion to a further consanguinity, it remains possible that the mayor of the palace, Hugh, could be an ancestor of Chimnechilde.

== Queenship ==
She married Sigebert III, and initially, their marriage was childless. The mayor of their palace, Grimoald, convinced them to adopt his son, Childebert. Eventually, Chimnechild and Sigebert III had two children: a daughter, Bilichild (wife of Childeric II), and the future King Dagobert II (though some scholars, such as Wood, question whether Dagobert was Chimnechild's biological child).

In 656 CE, Sigebert III died, and the small child Dagobert II was placed on the throne, with Chimnechild and Grimoald apparently in power behind the scenes. A few years later, c. 660, Grimoald executed a coup to seize power and place his son, Childebert the Adopted, on the throne. They had Dagobert II tonsured and forced to go on pilgrimage to Ireland, while Chimnechild and her daughter Bilichild fled.

== Regency ==
Following Childebert's death in 657, a mere year into his reign, she began manoeuvring. She opposed the succession of Theuderic III and of Dagobert II, and instead arranged a marriage between her daughter Bilichild and Childeric II, whose succession she supported. Apparently as part of the agreement for Childeric to take the throne, she was appointed to act as regent when he became king in 662; she remained regent until 675 CE.
