= Bertrude =

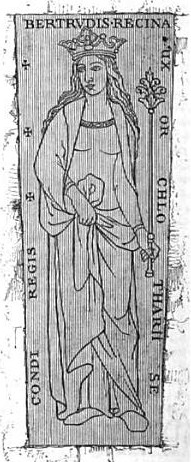

Queen consort of the Franks
- Tenure: 613–618
- Born: c. 582
- Died: 618 or 619
- Burial: Abbey of Saint-Germain-des-Prés
- Spouse: Chlothar II
- Issue: Bertha

Bertrude (c. 582–618 or 619) was a Frankish queen consort from 613 to 618. She was married to Chlothar II.

Her origins are uncertain and unconfirmed; however, it is known that the Mayor of the Palace Erchinoald was King Dagobert I’s cousin through his mother, making her the sister of Saint Gerberge and, therefore, a daughter of Richomer and Saint Gertrude of Hamage. Because Chlothar had three wives (Haldetrude, Bertrude, and Sichilde) and it is not known which was mother of his sons Dagobert I and Charibert II, it is not clear this daughter of Richomer was Bertrude. It is also possible Bertrude was a daughter of Wagon II.

According to the Chronicle of Fredegar, Bertrude loved Chlothar sincerely. She was also described as a popular queen. She is reported to have exposed and prevented an attempted plot by the Burgundian Aletheus, who planned to kill Chlothar and force Bertrude to marry him.

Bertrude died during the 35th year of Chlothar II’s reign, in either 618 or 619. Their daughter was called Bertha.
