= Bilichild (wife of Childeric II) =

7th c Queen Consort of the Franks

Queen consort of Neustria and Burgundy
- Tenure: 673 – 675
- Died: 675; Chelles
- Burial: Abbey of Saint-Germain-des-Prés
- Spouse: Childeric II
- Issue: Prince Dagobert; King Chilperic II
- Father: King Sigebert III
- Mother: Queen Chimnechild

Bilichild (also Bilichildis, Bilichilde, or Blithilde) was the wife of the Frankish king of Neustria and Burgundy Childeric II. The two were married in 668 despite the opposition of the Bishop Leodegar.

== Family ==
Bilichild was a daughter of King Sigebert III and Queen Chimnechild of Burgundy and granddaughter of King Dagobert I and his concubine Ragnétrude.

Her siblings were Dagobert II and Childebert the Adopted.

Children of Bilichild and her husband were Prince Dagobert and King Chilperic II.

== Biography ==
Childeric became sole king of the Franks in 673. While on a hunting trip in the Forest of Lognes, near Livry, in Picardy, Bilichild, along with her husband and her eldest son, the five-year-old Dagobert, was assassinated by a band of dissatisfied Neustrians—Bodilo, Amalbert and Ingobert. The royal trio was buried in Saint-Germain-des-Prés at Paris, where her tomb and that of Dagobert were discovered in 1645 and pilfered.

Her younger son Daniel was whisked off to a monastery and from there returned forty years thence to lead the Franks as king under the name Chilperic II.

== See also ==
- List of Burgundian consorts

== Sources ==
- Lexikon des Mittelalters
