= Clovis III =

- King of the Franks (disputed)
- A gold tremissis of Clovis

King in Austrasia
- Reign: 675(–676?)
- Predecessor: Childeric II
- Successor: Dagobert II
- Born: 670s?
- Dynasty: Merovingian (claimed)
- Father: Chlothar III (claimed)

Clovis III was the Frankish king of Austrasia in 675 and possibly into 676. A member of the Merovingian dynasty, he was a child and his reign so brief and contested that he may be considered only a pretender. He is sometimes even left unnumbered and Clovis IV is instead called Clovis III. The only source for his reign is the contemporary Suffering of Leudegar.

Following the assassination of Childeric II in 675, the kingdoms of Austrasia and Neustria accepted different claimants. In Neustria, under the influence of Leudegar, bishop of Autun, Childeric's younger brother Theuderic III was installed as king. In Austrasia, Ebroin, the former mayor of the palace, installed Clovis III with support of a faction of the magnates opposed to the mayoralty of Wulfoald.

Ebroin and his allies claimed that Clovis was a son of Chlothar III, Childeric's older brother. The Suffering of Leudegar claims that this was a lie, although there is nothing implausible in it, since Chlothar was about twenty-three years old when he died. Nor is the naming of Clovis unusual, since firstborn sons in the Merovingian dynasty were often named after their grandfathers, and Chlothar's father was Clovis II. When Theuderic III had a son in 677, however, he named him Clovis (the future Clovis IV) and this may be taken as evidence that the Suffering is correct and his brother never had a son of that name.

At last they took a certain lad, pretended that he had been a son of Clothar, and this boy they raised to the throne in the regions of Austrasia. This allowed them to gather together many people to form an army because it seemed to everyone that they were telling the truth. So when by their ravaging they had put the fatherland under their yoke, they gave orders to the judges in the name of their king, the pretender they had put up. They commanded that whoever wished to refuse obedience to them should give up his right to hold power or, if he did not take flight and go into hiding, he would be put to the sword. Oh, just how many people did this scorching lie lead to believe that at that time Theuderic was dead and this Clovis was the son of Clothar? ...
Now, since, as has been said, Ebroin could not hide his villainy any longer, he turned his scheming from the false king he had put up, in order that he might go back to the palace of Theuderic.

— Passio Leudegarii I, ch. 19, 28

Ebroin needed a legitimate Merovingian in order to raise an army and to issue legally binding orders (praecepta). (A generation later, the same requirement forced Charles Martel to find a Merovingian pretender, Chlothar IV, in 717.) Once raised, Ebroin marched the army into the northwest of the kingdom and seized the royal treasury in the fall of 675. Once he had secured control of the treasury, he no longer needed Clovis and he abandoned him, declaring himself for Theuderic III. Those Austrasians opposed to Ebroin and to union with Neustria, however, did not recognise Theuderic, and instead enthroned Dagobert II sometime between 2 April and 30 June 676.

There are some coins that have been attributed to the short reign of Clovis III. This attribution, first suggested by Jean Lafaurie in 1956, has been accepted by Egon Felder and Philip Grierson. A gold tremissis bearing the name CHLODOVIO RIX and the name of the moneyer, Eborino, probably belongs to him. Although it was possibly minted under Clovis IV, there is no evidence for the continuation of gold coinage in the Frankish kingdoms past the 670s. Likewise, late gold tremisses of Marseille bearing the name of Clovis probably belong to Clovis III. Stylistically, these have much in common with the coinage of Dagobert II, bearing the cross-on-steps motif on the reverse in imitation of Byzantine coinage.

Nothing is known of the ultimate fate of Clovis III.

== Bibliography ==
- Blet-Lemarquand, Maryse; Bompaire, Marc; Morrisson, Cécile (2010). "Platine et plomb dans les monnaies d'or mérovingiennes: nouvelles perspectives analytiques". Revue Numismatique. 6 (166): 175–198. doi:10.3406/numi.2010.2934.
- Fouracre, Paul J.; Gerberding, Richard A., eds. (1996). Late Merovingian France: History and Hagiography, 640–720. Manchester University Press.
- Gerberding, Richard A. (1987). The Rise of the Carolingians and the Liber Historiae Francorum. Oxford: Oxford University Press.
- Grierson, Philip; Blackburn, Mark (2007). Medieval European Coinage, Volume 1: The Early Middle Ages (5th–10th Centuries). Cambridge: Cambridge University Press.
- Wood, Ian N. (1994). The Merovingian Kingdoms, 450–751. Harlow: Longman.

Clovis III Merovingian Dynasty Died: 676
Preceded by Childeric II	King of Austrasia; 675–676	Succeeded by Dagobert II
