= Grimoald the Elder =

Frankish official (616–657)

Grimoald
- Mayor of the palace
- Born: 616
- Died: 657
- Noble family: Pippinids
- Issue: Childebert the Adopted; Vulfetrude
- Father: Pepin of Landen
- Mother: Itta of Metz

Grimoald I (616–657), called the Elder (in French, Grimaud l'Ainé), was the mayor of the palace of Austrasia from 643 to his death. He was the son of Pepin of Landen and Itta.

With the death of Pepin in 640, Grimoald became the head of his household, the most powerful in Austrasia. At this time, Radulf, Duke of Thuringia, rebelled against Sigebert III, king of Austrasia. Grimoald participated in the ensuing expedition against the insurrection, but it was a failure. Nevertheless, Grimoald succeeded in saving the life of the king and became his close friend. Then, by removing his rival, Otto, he took over the position which his father once held.

Grimoald convinced the childless Sigebert III to adopt his son, named Childebert at his baptism. Sigebert eventually had an heir, Dagobert II, but upon Sigebert's death in 656, Grimoald had the young Dagobert exiled to Ireland and put his son on the throne.

Grimoald was eventually captured and executed by the king of Neustria—either Clovis II or his son and successor, Chlothar III.

Preceded by Otto	Mayor of the Palace; 643–657	Succeeded by Wulfoald
