= Bilichild =

Bilichild or Bilhild (Latin Bilichildis or Bilihildis, French Bilichilde or Bilchilde) may refer to:

- Bilichild (wife of Theudebert II) (died 610), queen of Austrasia
- Bilichild (wife of Childeric II) (died 675), queen of Neustria
- Bilihildis of Altmünster (died 734), Frankish noblewoman, abbess and saint
- Bilichild, wife of Rorgon I, Count of Maine (r. 832–839)
- Bilichild (daughter of Rorgon I of Maine) (born 819)
