= Childebert the Adopted =

Frankish king

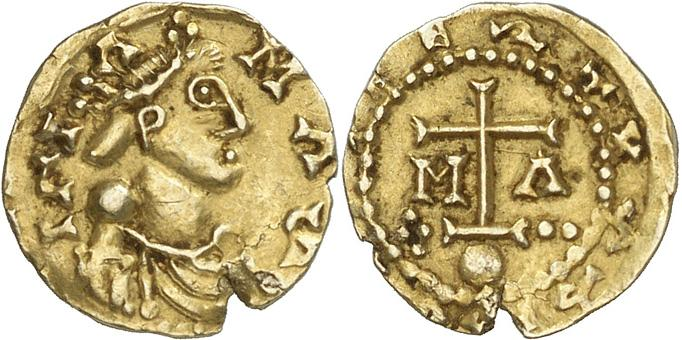
- Coin of Childebert

King of Austrasia
- Reign: 656-657
- Predecessor: Sigebert III
- Successor: Chlothar III
- Died: 657 or 662
- House: Pippinids
- Father: Grimoald the Elder; Sigebert III (adoptive)

Childebert III the Adopted (Childebertus Adoptivus) was a Frankish king.

Childebert was a son of the Mayor of the Palace Grimoald the Elder. He was thus a grandson of Pepin of Landen.

He was adopted by King Sigebert III and Queen Chimnechild.

When Sigebert III died in 656, Grimoald had Sigebert’s biological son Dagobert II tonsured and sent him to an Irish monastery and then proclaimed Childebert king of Austrasia.

Grimoald, Childebert and Ansegisel (who had married the daughter of Pepin of Landen) were finally seized and turned over to the king of Neustria, Clovis II, who had them killed. There are two differing accounts of his death, however. Either Clovis and his mayor of the palace, Erchinoald, captured and executed him in 657 or Chlothar III annexed Austrasia in 661, deposing the young usurper and executing them both the next year.

The family reappeared in politics with the rise of Ansegisel’s son, Pepin of Herstal.

Preceded by Sigebert III	King of Austrasia; 656–661	Succeeded by Chlothar III
