= Clovis II =

King of the Franks from 639 to 657

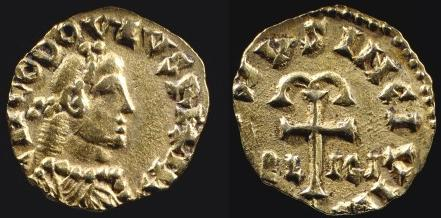
- A sou of Clovis II

King of the Franks in Neustria and Burgundy
- Reign: 639–657
- Predecessor: Dagobert I
- Successor: Chlothar III
- Born: 633
- Died: 657 (aged 23–24)
- Burial: Saint Denis Basilica, Paris
- Spouse: Balthild
- Issue: Chlothar III; Childeric II; Theuderic III
- Dynasty: Merovingian
- Father: Dagobert I
- Mother: Nanthild

Clovis II (633 – 657) was King of the Franks in Neustria and Burgundy, having succeeded his father Dagobert I in 639. His brother Sigebert III had been King of Austrasia since 634. He was initially under the regency of his mother Nanthild until her death in her early thirties in 642. Nanthild's death allowed Clovis to fall under the influence of the secular magnates, who reduced the royal power in their own favour; first Aega and then Erchinoald. The Burgundian mayor of the palace Flaochad used him to lure his rival, Willebad, to a battle in Autun, in which Willebad was killed.

== Background ==
Clovis married Balthild, an Anglo-Saxon sold into slavery in Gaul. She had been owned by the Neustrian mayor of the palace, Erchinoald, but then attracted the interest of the king. They had three sons, who all became kings after his death. The eldest, Chlothar, succeeded him and his second eldest, Childeric, was placed on the Austrasian throne and eventually also succeeded in Neustria. The youngest, Theuderic, succeeded Childeric in Neustria and eventually became the sole king of the Franks.

Clovis was a minor for almost the whole of his reign. He is sometimes regarded as king of Austrasia during the interval 656–57 when Childebert the Adopted usurped the throne. Grimoald the Elder, mayor of the palace of Austrasia, was captured and later executed in Paris by Clovis II, the king of Neustria, in 657. He is often regarded as an early roi fainéant. Belgian historian Henri Pirenne stated that Clovis "died insane."

Clovis II was buried in Saint Denis Basilica, Paris.

Clovis II Merovingian Dynasty Born: 633 Died: 657
Preceded by Dagobert I	King of the Franks in Neustria and Burgundy; 639–657	Succeeded by Chlothar III
