= Childeric II =

7th-century Frankish king

- King of the Franks
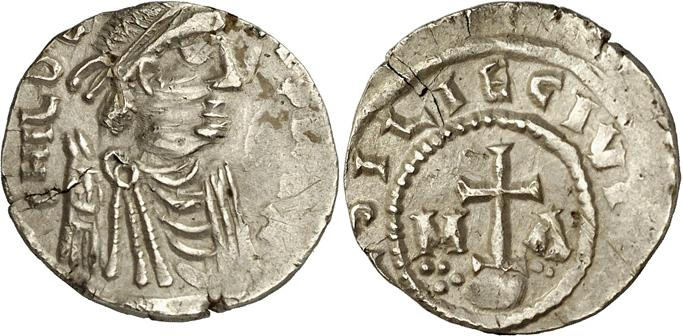
- Childericʻs solidus of pale gold

King in Austrasia
- Reign: 662–675
- Predecessor: Chlothar III
- Successor: Clovis III

King in Neustria and Burgundy
- Reign: 673–675
- Predecessor: Theuderic III
- Successor: Theuderic III

King of the Franks
- Reign: 673–675
- Predecessor: Vacant (last held by Dagobert I)
- Successor: Vacant (next held by Theuderic III in 679)
- Born: c. 653
- Died: c. 675 (aged 21–22)
- Burial: Saint-Germain-des-Prés
- Spouse: Bilichild
- Issue: Dagobert; Chilperic II
- Dynasty: Merovingian
- Father: Clovis II
- Mother: Balthild

Childeric II (c. 653 – 675) was King of the Franks in the 7th century. He ruled Austrasia from 662 and Neustria and Burgundy from 673 until his death, making him sole king for the final two years of his life.

Childeric was the second eldest son of King Clovis II and grandson of King Dagobert I and Queen Nanthild. His mother was Saint Balthild and his elder brother was Chlothar III, who was briefly sole king from 661 but gave Austrasia to Childeric the next year. Childeric was still a mere child when he was raised on the shields of his warriors and proclaimed king in Austrasia.

Childeric married his cousin Bilichild, who gave birth to two sons: Dagobert and the future king Chilperic II.

After the death of Chlothar in 673, Theuderic III, his youngest brother, inherited his kingdoms, but a faction of prominent Burgundian nobles led by Saint Leodegar and Adalrich rebelled against Theuderic and Ebroin, Mayor of the Palace, inviting Childeric to become king in Neustria and Burgundy. He soon invaded his brother's kingdom and displaced him, becoming sole king. He made his Austrasian Mayor of the Palace, Wulfoald, mayor in Neustria and Burgundy as well, upsetting his supporters in Burgundy who did not wish to see functionaries active in a kingdom other than their native one. In March 675, Childeric granted honores in Alsace to Adalrich with the title of dux. This grant was most probably the result of Adalrich's continued support for Childeric in Burgundy, which had often disputed possession of Alsace with Austrasia.

The final straw for the magnates of Neustria was Childeric's illegal corporal punishment of a nobleman named Bodilo. In 675, Bodilo and his friends Amalbert and Ingobert conspired to assassinate the king, who was killed, along with his wife Bilichild and his five-year-old son Dagobert, while hunting in the forest of Livry (present-day Lognes). Childeric's younger son, Chilperic, was absent and thus survived. He grew up in a monastery.

Childeric, his wife, and their son Dagobert were buried in Saint-Germain-des-Prés, near Paris, where their tombs were discovered in 1645 and the contents pilfered.

== Sources ==
- Bachrach, Bernard S.; Bachrach, David S.; Leese, Michael (2018). Deeds of the Bishops of Cambrai, Translation and Commentary. Routledge. ISBN 9781317036210.

Childeric II Merovingian dynasty Born: 653 Died: 675
Preceded by Chlothar III	King of the Franks in Austrasia; 662–675	Succeeded by Clovis III
Preceded by Theuderic III	King of the Franks in Neustria and Burgundy; 673–675	Succeeded by Theuderic III
