= Chlothar III =

- King of the Franks
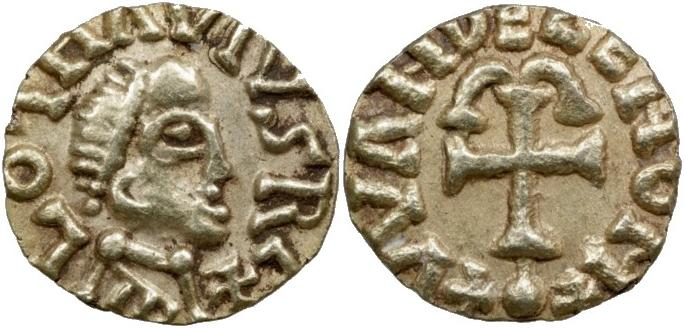
- A tremissis of Chlothar III minted at Paris

King of the Franks in Neustria and Burgundy
- Reign: 657–673
- Predecessor: Clovis II
- Successor: Theuderic III

King of the Franks in Austrasia
- Reign: 661–662
- Predecessor: Childebert the Adopted
- Successor: Childeric II
- Born: 652
- Died: 673 (aged 20–21)
- Burial: Saint Denis Basilica, Paris
- Issue: Clovis III?
- Dynasty: Merovingian
- Father: Clovis II
- Mother: Balthild

Chlothar III (also spelled Chlotar, Clothar, Clotaire, Chlotochar, or Hlothar; 652–673) was King of the Franks, ruling in Neustria and Burgundy from 657 to his death. He also briefly ruled Austrasia.

He was the eldest son of King Clovis II, and his queen Balthild and succeeded his father under the regency of his mother. Only a month beforehand, according to the near-contemporary Life of Eligius by the courtier Audoin (bishop) of Rouen, Saint Eligius had prophesied the death of Clovis, Balthild's downfall, and Chlothar's short reign.

Few things are known about the time of Chlothar's reign. The Historia Langobardorum reports that in the early 660s a Frankish army invaded Provence and then Italy. This force came upon the camp of the Lombard king Grimoald I of Benevento, at Rivoli near Asta. Grimuald pretended to flee. The Franks looted the camp and celebrated. Then, after midnight, Grimuald attacked and drove them back to Neustria.

After the death of Saint Eligius in 661, the Life of Eligius records that a plague reduced the population of France's cities. A plague in the British Isles, according to Bede, did the same there in 664.

During the regency, Austrasians requested a king of their own and, in 662, Chlothar's court sent another son of Clovis II, Childeric II, to be king there.

Also during his reign, the mayor of the palace Erchinoald died and a council of Franks elected Ebroin to replace him. Ebroin's early administrative authority was significant: Bede tells the story of how, in 668, the newly appointed Theodore of Canterbury could only travel through the Frankish kingdoms from Rome with the mayor's permission. Chlothar may have been more politically active after this time, as he reached the age of majority in 669. The nearest contemporary chronicle, the Liber Historiae Francorum of 727, relates only that he ruled for four years (presumably a reference to his active years 669–673) and then died. He is confirmed as still being in the sixteenth year of his reign in a chronological note in a Victorian Easter table of 673. His brother Theuderic III succeeded him as king later that same year.

== Sources ==
- Bachrach, Bernard S.; Bachrach, David S.; Leese, Michael (2018). Deeds of the Bishops of Cambrai, Translation and Commentary. Routledge. ISBN 9781317036210.

Chlothar III Merovingian Dynasty Born: 652 Died: 673
Preceded by Clovis II	King of Neustria and Burgundy; 657–673	Succeeded by Theuderic III
Preceded by Childebert the Adopted	King of the Franks in Austrasia; 661–662	Succeeded by Childeric II
