= End of slavery in France =

National discontinuation of slavery

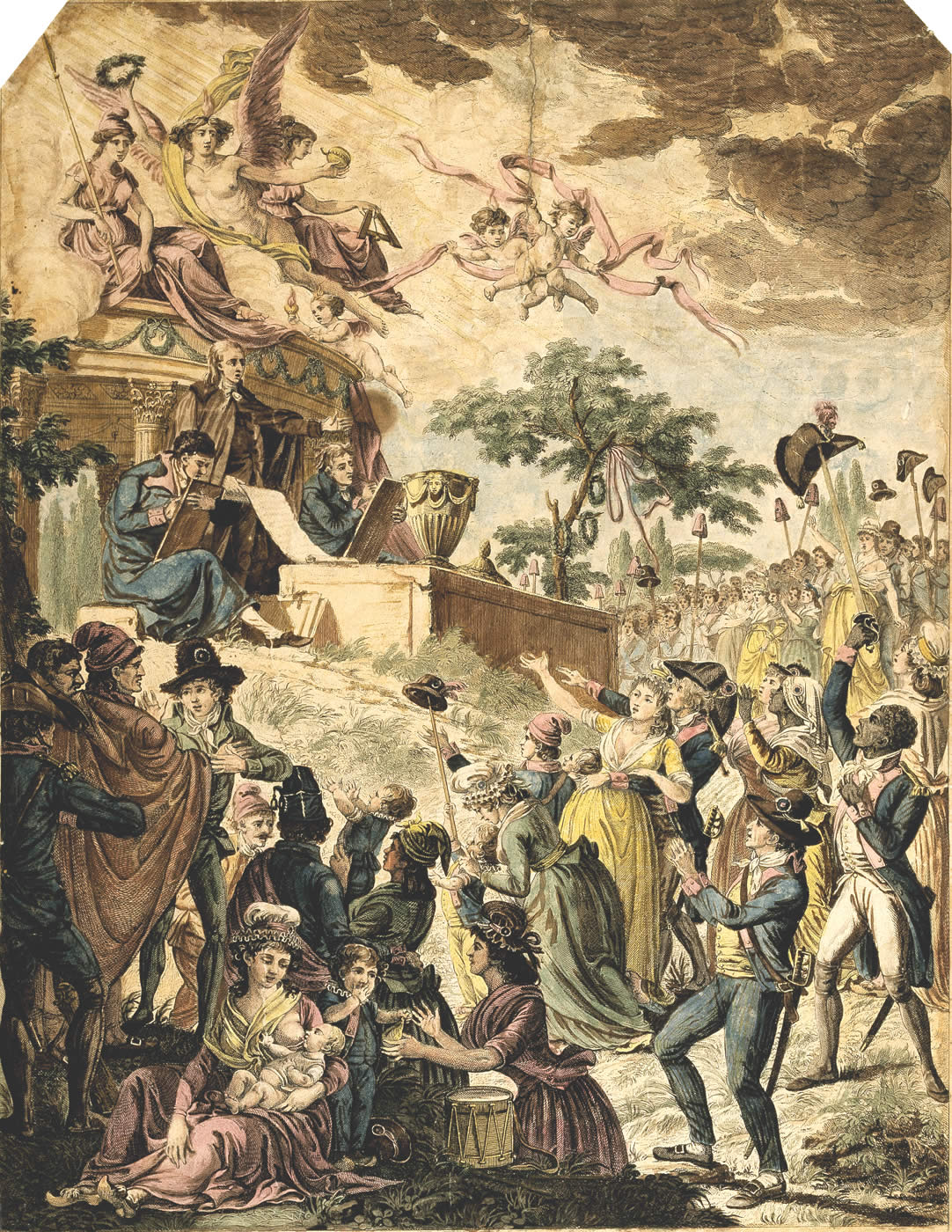
Réjouissances à l'annonce de l'abolition de l'esclavage, 30 pluviôse an II

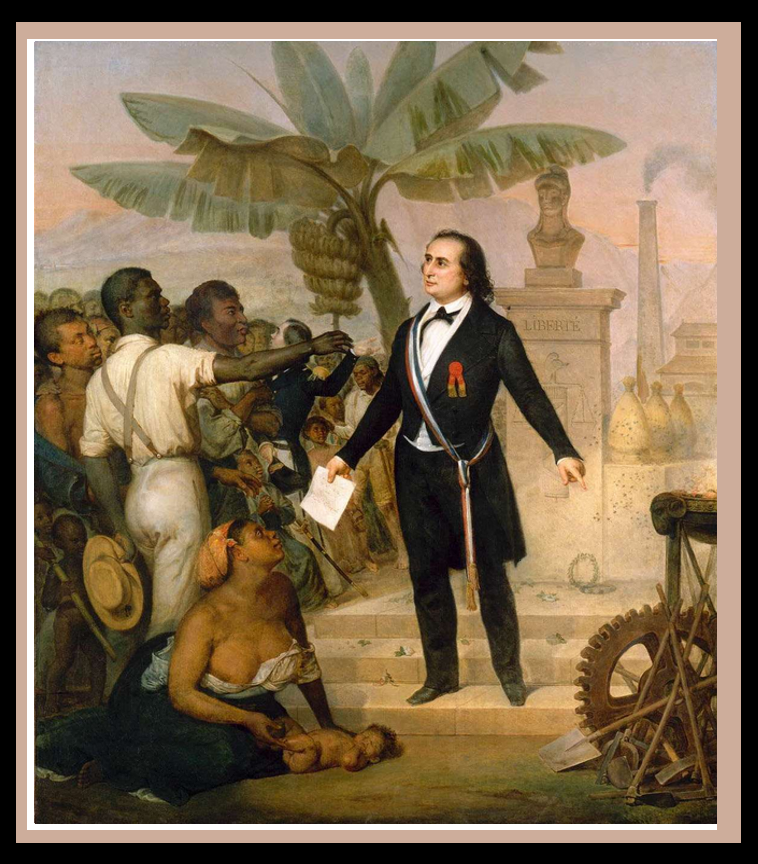
Alphonse Garreau.- L’Emancipation à la Réunion le 20 octobre 1848

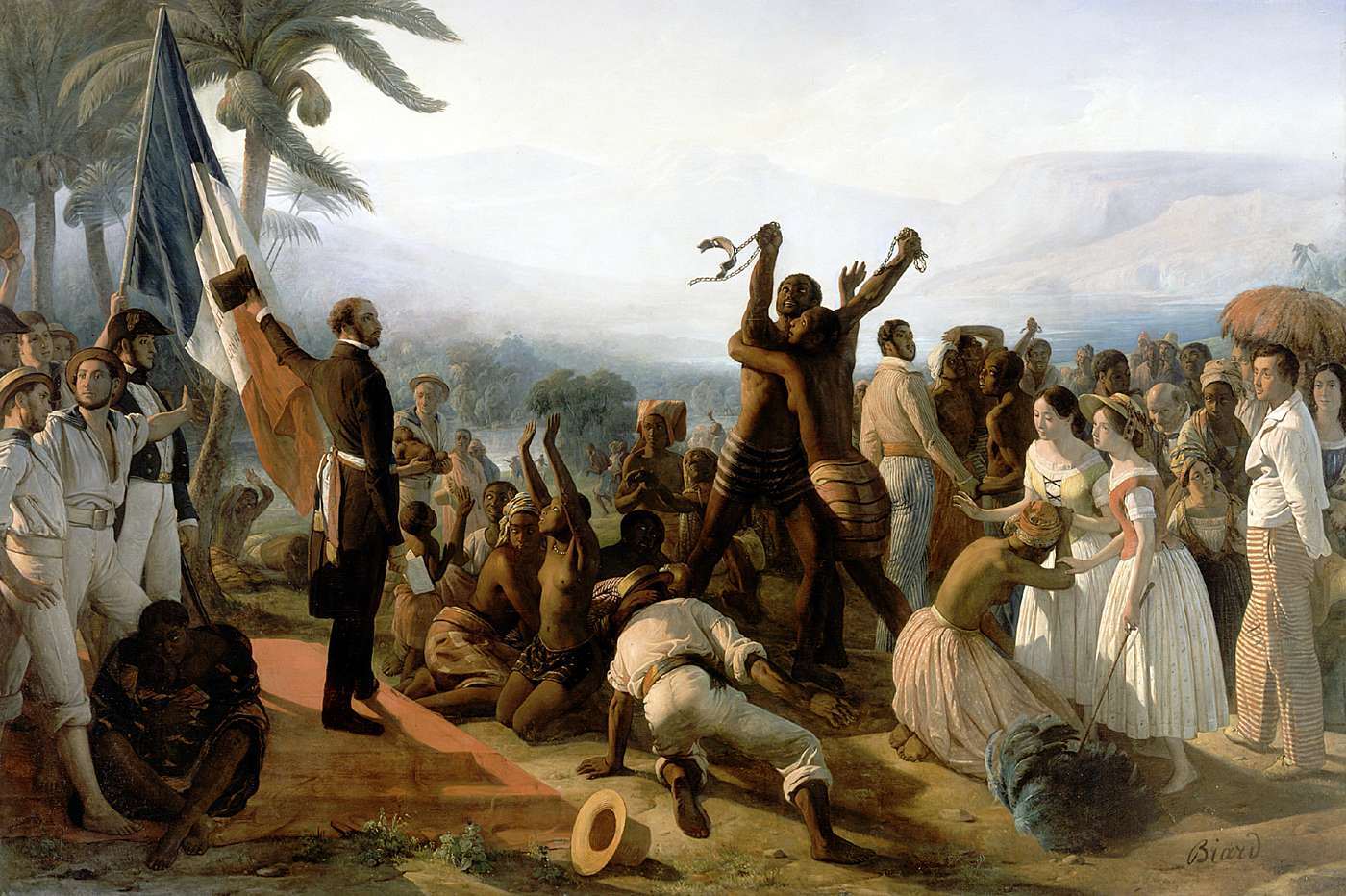
Proclamation of the Abolition of Slavery in the French Colonies, 27 April 1848, 1849, by François Auguste Biard, Palace of Versailles

The origins of slavery in France can be traced back to the Merovingian dynasty in the 4th century. At least five Frankish queens during that period were former slaves: Ingund, Fredegund, Bilichild, Nanthild, and Balthild. Slavery continued under the Carolingian Empire and was successively abolished by the French Republic amid the French Revolution.

== Background ==
In 1198, the Trinitarians were founded, with the purpose of redeeming war captives. This was one of the earliest steps towards eliminating slavery in France.

In 1315, Louis X published a decree, known as the Ordonnance royale du juillet, 1315 abolishing slavery and proclaiming that "France signifies freedom", with the effect that any slave setting foot on French soil should be freed. However, slavery continued until the 17th century in some of France's Mediterranean harbours in Provence, as well as until the 18th century in some of France's overseas territories. Most aspects of serfdom were also de facto abolished between 1315 and 1318. Louis X died two years after this event. In 1318, King Philip V abolished serfdom on his domain.

=== Society of the Friends of the Blacks ===
The Society of the Friends of the Blacks was founded in Paris in 1788, and remained active until 1793, during the midst of the French Revolution. It was led by Jacques Pierre Brissot, who frequently received advice from British abolitionist Thomas Clarkson, who led the abolitionist movement in Great Britain. At the beginning of 1789, the Society had 141 members.

== Period from 1794 to 1845 ==
A series of events took place from 1791 which led to the abolition of institutionalized slavery in France, including the establishment of the national convention and the election of the first Assembly of the First Republic (1792–1804), on 4 February 1794, under the leadership of Maximilien Robespierre, culminating in the passing of the Law of 4 February 1794, which abolished slavery in all French colonies.

The Abbé Grégoire and the Society of the Friends of the Blacks were part of the abolitionist movement, which had laid important groundwork in building anti-slavery sentiment in Metropolitan France. The first article of the law stated that "slavery was abolished" in the French colonies, while the second article stated that "slave-owners would be indemnified" with financial compensation for the value of their slaves. The French constitution promulgated in 1795 declared in its Declaration of the Rights of Man that slavery was abolished.

- In 1802, Napoleon re-introduced slavery in sugarcane-growing colonies. In 1815, Napoleon abolished the slave trade.
- In 1815, the Congress of Vienna declared its opposition to the slave trade.
- In 1818, three years after the fall of Napoleon, Louis XVIII abolished the slave trade once again.
- On 18 and 19 July 1845, a set of laws known as the Mackau Law was passed, which paved the way towards the abolition of slavery in France.

== Proclamation of the Abolition of Slavery in the French Colonies ==
The abolition of slavery in France was enacted with the Decree of the Abolition of Slavery of April 27, 1848.

In particular Martinique was the first French overseas territory in which the decree for the abolition of slavery actually came into force, on 23 May 1848.

Gabon was founded as a settlement for emancipated slaves.

== Final abolition (1903) and subsequent events ==
At about the same time, France started colonizing Africa and gained possession of much of West Africa by 1900. In 1905, the French abolished slavery in most of French West Africa. The French also attempted to abolish Tuareg slavery following the Kaocen Revolt. In the region of the Sahel, slavery has long persisted.

The abolition wasn't strictly enforced. Several French territories kept practicing slavery until 1904 as was the case in Senegal or 1894 in French Sudan.

Passed on 10 May 2001, the Taubira law officially acknowledges slavery and the Atlantic slave trade as a crime against humanity. 10 May was chosen as the day dedicated to recognition of the crime of slavery.

== Slavery in France in the 21st century ==
Since the abolition of slavery proclamation in 1848, additional efforts were made to eliminate other forms of slavery. In 1890, the Brussels Conference Act (a collection of anti-slavery measures aimed at ending the slave trade on land and sea, especially in the Congo Basin, the Ottoman Empire, and the East African coast) was signed, followed in 1904 by the International Agreement for the suppression of the White Slave Traffic. Only France, the Netherlands and Russia applied the treaty to the entirety of their colonial empires with immediate effect. In 1926, the Slavery Convention was ratified by France and other nations.

Although slavery has been outlawed for over a century, many criminal organizations still practice human trafficking. For this reason, on July 25, 2013, France recognized modern-day slavery as a crime punishable by up to 30 years in jail.

== See also ==
- Slavery in France
- Slavery in the British and French Caribbean
- Slavery in medieval Europe
- Slavery in the United States
- Slavery in Haiti
- Affranchi
- Race in France
- Slavery museum (France)
