= Slavery in France =

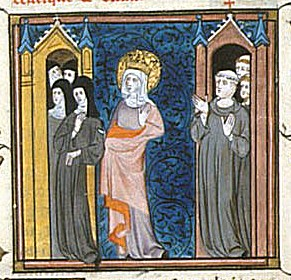
Saint Bathild

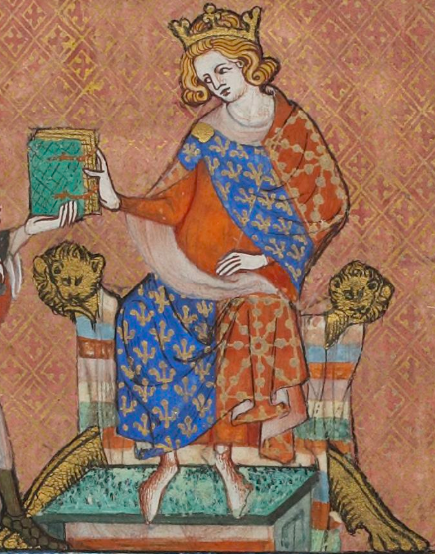
Miniature depiction of Louis X from the Life of Saint Louis, c. 1330–1340

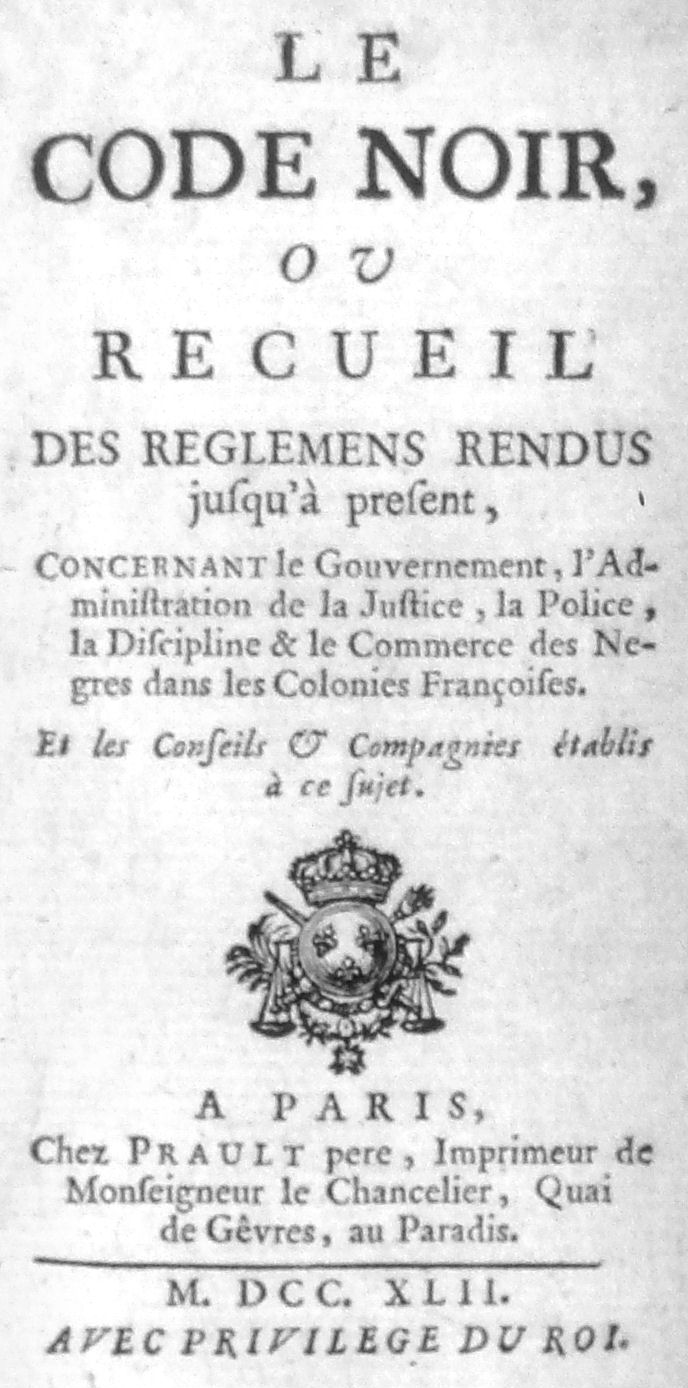
A frontispiece of the Code Noir, from the 1742 edition.

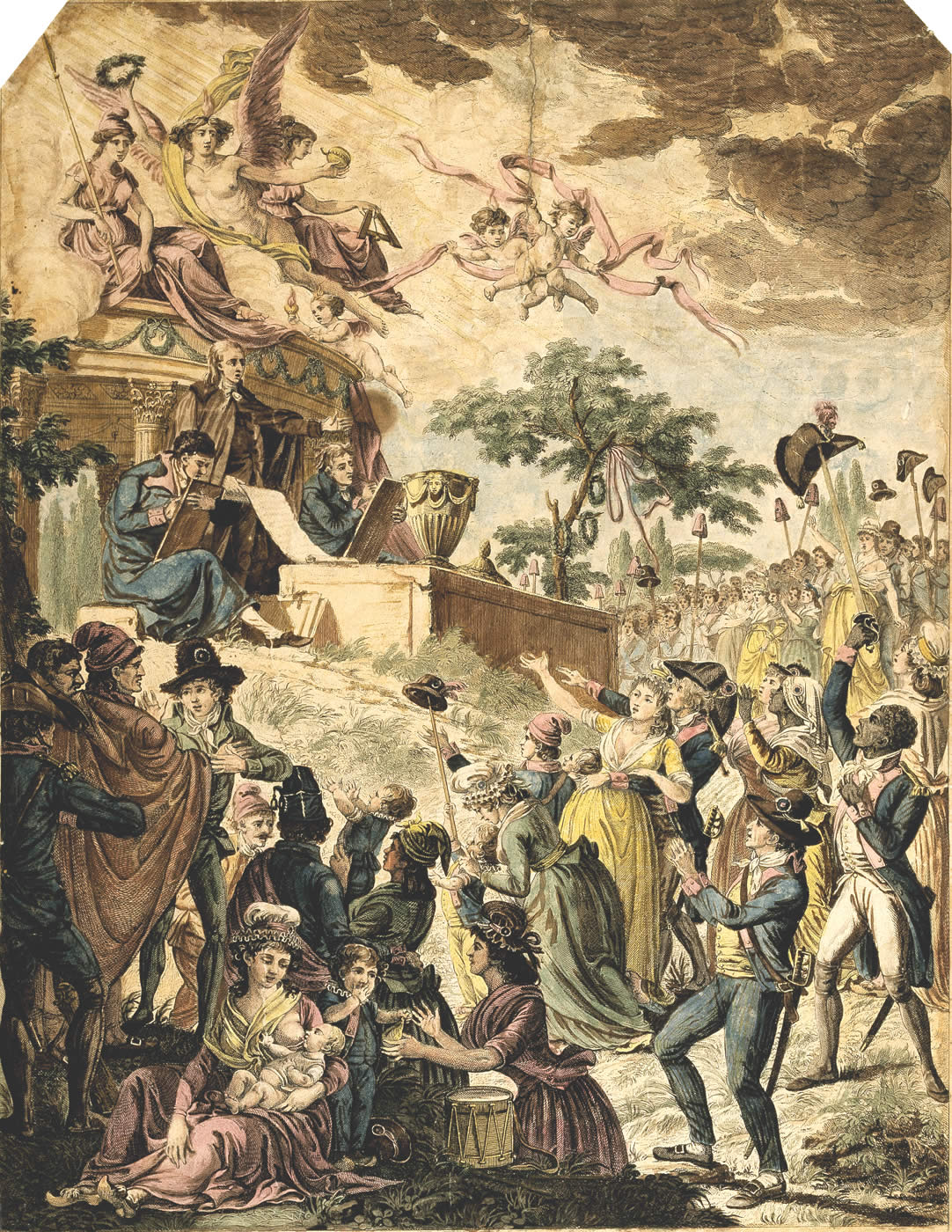
A contemporary French illustration commemorating the Law of 4 February 1794

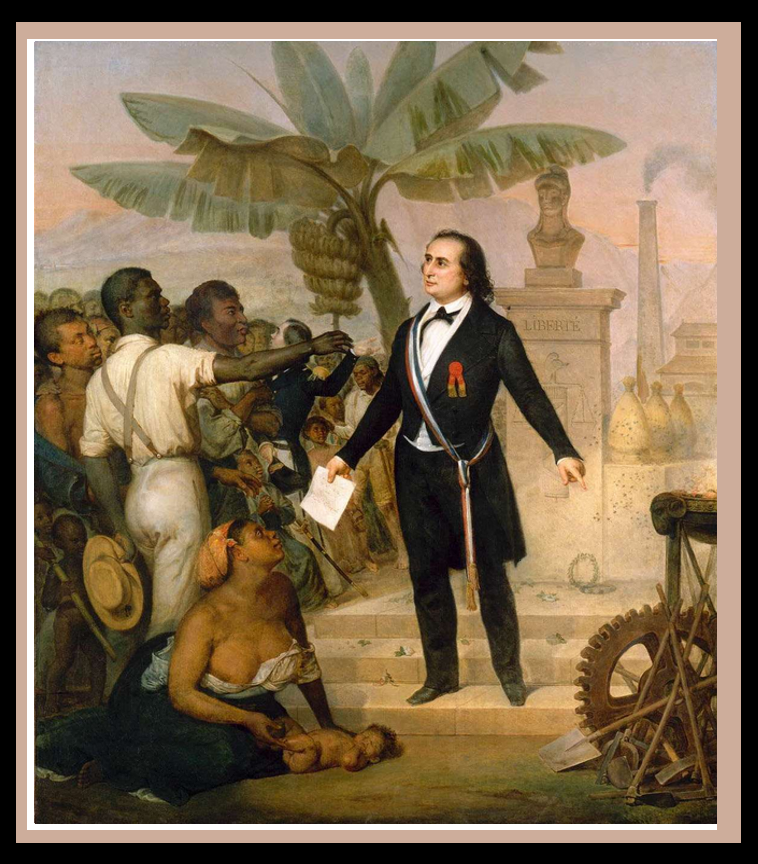
Alphonse Garreau.- L’Emancipation à la Réunion le 20 octobre 1848

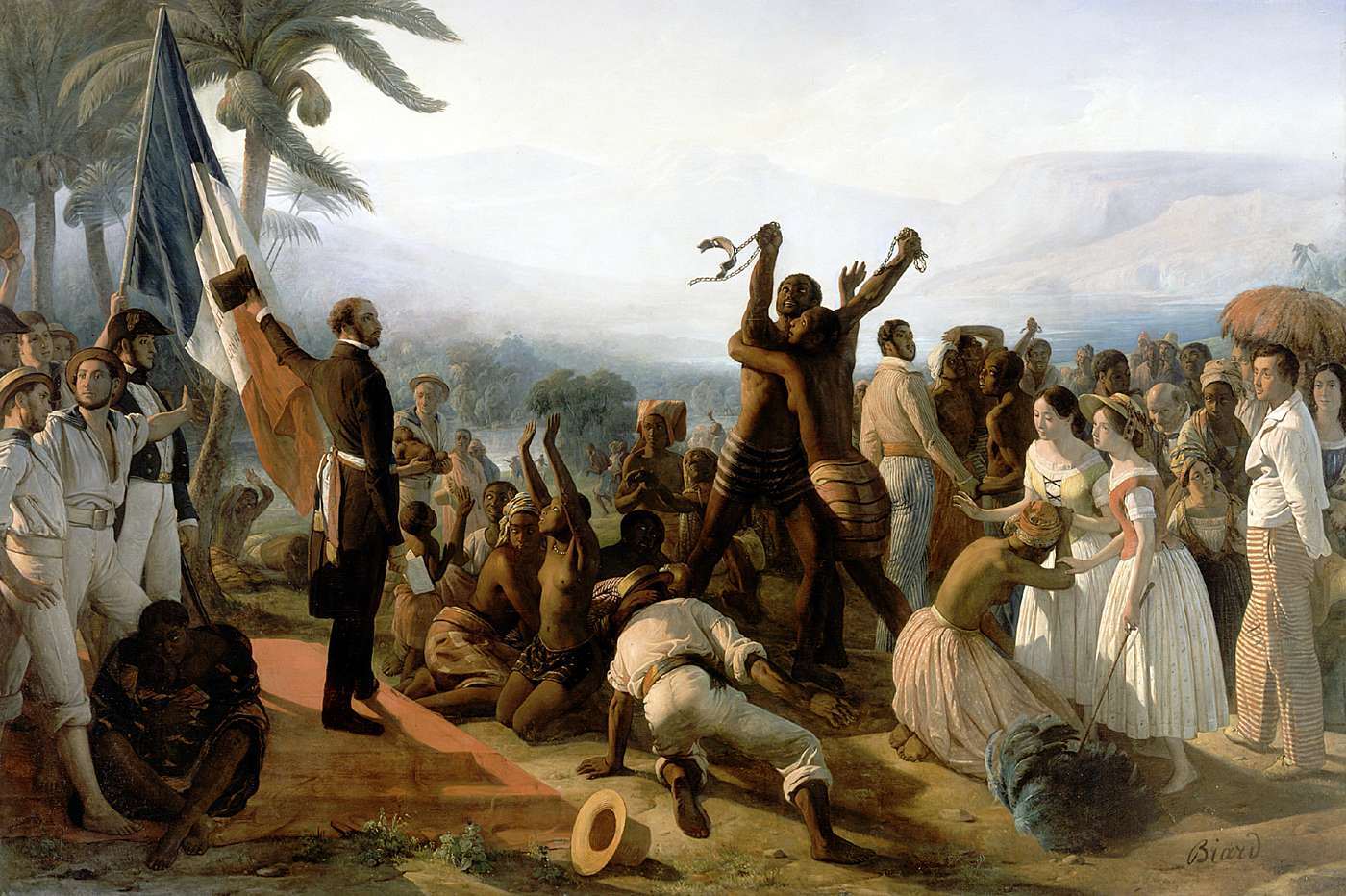
Proclamation of the Abolition of Slavery in the French Colonies, 27 April 1848, 1849, by François Auguste Biard, Palace of Versailles.

Slavery in France, and by extension, the French Empire, covers a wide range of disparate topics.

During the Middle Ages, chattel slavery was legal in France itself. In the early Merovingian Middle Ages, there was a trade in slaves from the British Isles to France. In the Frankish Middle Ages, France served as a middle station in the saqaliba slave trade of Pagan slaves from Northeastern Europe to al-Andalus in the Southwest, which were transported from Prague to the Caliphate of Cordoba via France.

Chattel slavery in France gradually transitioned to serfdom and was finally abolished in the 1310s, specifically with a decree in 1315. While chattel slavery was never again made legal in France itself, it was later allowed in the French colonies from the 17th century. During the French colonial empire, slavery was legal in the colonies while remaining banned in France itself. Despite being illegal, some Africans remained enslaved within France in practice. This was a common parallel system used in many European countries at the time. In 1794, slavery was abolished in the French colonies of America and the Caribbean. Slavery was reintroduced in the colonies in 1802 and finally abolished in 1848 - with the exception of West African domestic slavery which persisted until the 20th century.

== Slavery in France ==
=== Slavery in Merovingian France ===
In 486, Clovis I, the son of Childeric, defeated Syagrius, a Roman military leader who competed with the Merovingians for power in northern France. Like the Roman empire before them, the Merovingians used slavery.

Slavery in Merovingian France included several Frankish queens in the Merovingian dynasty who had formerly been slaves. Only five slave queens have been identified in Merovingian France, though there may have been more: Ingund, Fredegund, Bilichild, Nanthild, and Balthild. Slavery continued during the Carolingian Empire.

=== Slavery transforms to serfdom ===
Slavery was gradually phased out and replaced by serfdom in Francia in parallel with the establishment of feudalism in Western Europe (later France and Germany), a system which did not include slavery. This was a system that was completed by Charlemagne (r. 768–814), but the process of phasing out slavery had been set long before the reign of Charlemagne.

In Roman Gaul, the land estates of the Roman country villas in Gaul had been worked by slave laborers called ancillae (sing. ancilla) or servi (sing. servus), who worked the land of the landowner, the dominus. When Roman rule in Gaul was replaced by the migrating Germanic tribes in settling in Gaul in the 5th century, the Roman villa estates started to transition to become feudal estates, and the transition of slavery to serfdom was a part of this. The slavery system was dependent upon a strong central power and legal enforcement, which was no longer possible in the Post Roman world, where an estate was now forced to be self-sufficient, and rely on cooperation. In order to keep their labor force and ensure their cooperation, the landowners started to manumit their slaves and give their former slaves, called coloni or servi casati, their own land, known as mansi, in exchange for working also on the landowner's own land, demesne.

When the former slaves were given their own land, they could no longer be sold or bought as property, but was liberated and referred to as franci or coloni. As free peasants with their own land the former slave laborers were motivated to work better for the landowner; and when they were free to marry and leave their land as inheritance to their children, the labor force of the landowner started to reproduce itself instead of the landowner being responsible for supplying new laborers (via slave purchases). The method of freeing the slaves and giving them land in exchange for working duty on the landowners land, was seen as more efficient by the landowners, since the free laborers were motivated to work and did not have to be supervised; and while slavery was not abolished, the new labor method became so popular among the landowners that by the 7th century, the rural slave laborers had been almost completely replaced by free serf peasant laborers, and slavery reduced to urban house slaves. The former rural slaves mixed via intermarriage with the originally free rural population, and the peasantry merged to become a single class.

This development was completed during the reign of Charlemagne (r. 768–814), who wanted to unite Western Europe under an efficient central state control by establishing the feudal system, a system were serfs were included rather than slaves. By the 11th century, the feudal system had become more clearly defined in reference to serfdom: the manses igenuiles were the originally free peasants; the manses seviles were the descendants of the manumitted rural slaves; and the manses lidile were likely the descendants of the former Germanic settlers.

However, the transformation from rural slavery to serfdom did not eradicate slavery, only marginalized it. Urban house slaves continued to be popular for centuries after the eradication of rural slavery, and were phased out in favor of free workers much slower, disappearing earlier in the North and slower in the South. By the 12th and the 13th century, almost all rural slaves in Western Europe had been replaced by serfs; the urban house slaves had been replaced by free servants; and the rural peasantry had come to be collectively defined as serfs.

=== Slave trade ===
There is little information about the slave trade in Francia between the Roman era and the 8th century. However, it is believed to have continued along the old Roman slave route from the British Isles in the Northwest to Marseilles in the Southeast. This was the old slave route during Roman times, when slaves were the only type of goods desired from Northern Europe in exchange for luxury goods from the East.

This appear to have continued during the 6th and 7th century; Anglo-Saxon slaves are known to have been imported to Italy in this time period. One of the earliest accounts of slaves from early medieval Britain come from the description of fair-haired boys from York seen in Rome by Pope Gregory the Great, in a biography written by an anonymous monk. Pagan Angels and Saxons were known to be exported from the British Isles over the English channel to Arras and Tournai and then across France to the Mediterranian via the great slave port of Marseilles. It is known that the Frisian slave dealers visited Ango-Saxon London during the 7th and 8th centuries to purchase slaves, which they then sold along the river ways to the German cities and Southward to Paris.

However, from the 8th century onward, the slave trade in Francia became an important industry, when France became a slave trade transit area for European slaves to the Muslim world. While slavery was slowly phased out in France itself during the Middle Ages, the slave trade was nevertheless profitable in France, because it targeted European slaves for destinations in the big and profitable slave market of the Muslim world. This made France an important transit area for slaves trafficked from Europe North of France to the Muslim world in the South. This slave trade was profitable for France for centuries, despite slavery dying out in France itself.

In the Germanic Kingdoms, Christians were banned from selling Christians as slaves to the non-Christians in the Church council of Orleans (627–630) and the Council of Chalon (639–654). The prohibition in selling Christians made the trade in non-Christian specifically targeted for the slave trade. The slaves trafficked in the slave trade via France were therefore mainly Pagans.

There were two big slave routes in the Carolingian Empire in the 8th century: the South route trafficked Pagan Slavs via Bavaria over the Alps to Venice and from there via the Venetian slave trade to the Middle East; and the Western route from Germany to France via the Moselle, Meuse and Rhone to Arles and Marseilles, from where they were trafficked to their destination for slavery in al-Andalus, Maghreb and Egypt; the victims were mainly Pagan Slavs, but also Pagan Saxons and British peoples. Marseilles was one of the biggest slave markets in France, primarily dealing in non-Christian slaves, Moors, Pagans and Anglo-Saxon slaves.

During the 9th century, the slave trade in the Carolingian Empire was mainly a transit trade, in which Pagan slaves were trafficked via France to their destination in the Muslim world, were the slave market were. The Church repeatedly opposed the slave trade, but their prohibitions had limited effect, since the Franks wanted gold and Eastern luxury goods, and slaves were the only goods the Middle East wanted from Europe in exchange.

The Church Council of Estinnes (743) banned Christians to sell Christian slaves to non-Christians, and the Council of Meux (845) condemned both Christian and Jewish slave traders from selling slaves to the Muslims, and suggested that Christians buy the slaves being trafficked through France, in order to save them from being sold to the Islamic world.

The slave market in Rouen were still in operation in the early 11th century, but after this the slave trade in Western Europe started to rapidly die out, since the Eastern European Slavs had converted to Christianity (and it was no longer possible to acquire Pagan slaves).

==== Saqaliba slave trade ====
Between the 8th and the 11th-century, France played an important role as the middleman in the Prague slave trade with saqaliba slaves (Pagan Slavs) from North East Europe to slavery in al-Andalus in the Southwest.

In Western Europe, a major slave trade route went from Prague in Central Europe via France to Moorish al-Andalus, which was both a destination for the slaves as well as center of slave trade to the rest of the Muslim world in the Middle East. Prague in the Duchy of Bohemia, which was a recently Christianized state in the early 10th century, became a major center of the European slave trade in between the 9th and the 11th century. The revenue from the Prague slave trade has been named as one of the economic foundations of the Bohemian state, financing the armies necessary to form a centralized state, which was not uncommon for the new Christian state in Eastern Europe.

The Duchy of Bohemia was a state in a religious border zone, bordering Pagan Slavic lands to the north, east and southeast. In the Middle Ages, religion was the determining factor in who was considered a legitimate target for enslavement. Christians prohibited Christians from enslaving other Christians, and Muslims prohibited Muslims from enslaving other Muslims; however, both approved of the enslavement of Pagans, who thereby became a lucrative target for slave traders.

The Pagan Slavic tribes of Central and Eastern Europe were targeted for slavery by several actors in the frequent military expeditions and raids alongside their lands. During the military campaigns of Charlemagne and his successor in the 9th century, Pagan Slavs were captured and sold by the Christian Franks along the Danube-Elbe rivers. By the mid-10th century, Prague had become a big center of the slave trade in Slavic Pagans to al-Andalus via France.

The slaves sold by the Vikings via the Eastern route could be Christian Western Europeans, but the slaves provided by the Vikings to the slave route of Prague-Magdeburg-Verdun were Pagan Slavs, who in contrast to Christians were legitimate for other Christians to enslave and sell as slaves to Muslims; according to Liutprand of Cremona, these slaves were trafficked to slavery in al-Andalus via Verdun, where some of them were selected to undergo castration to become eunuchs for the Muslim slave market in al-Andalus.

The slaves were transported from Prague to Al-Andalus via France. While the church discouraged the sale of Christian slaves to Muslims, the sale of Pagans to Muslims was not met with such opposition. Louis the Fair granted his permission to Jewish merchants to traffick slaves through his Kingdom provided they were non-baptized Pagans.

The saqaliba slave trade from Prague to al-Andalus via France lost its religious legitimacy and ended when the pagan Slavs of the north started to gradually adopt Christianity from the late 10th century, which made them out of bounds for Christian Bohemia to enslave and sell to Muslim al-Andalus. The Prague slave trade was not able to legitimately supply their slave pool after the Slavs gradually adopted Christianity from the late 10th century onward.

=== Abolition of slavery and serfdom in France ===
In 1198, the Trinitarians were founded by John of Matha with the purpose of ransoming war captive Christians by Muslims during the Crusades. King Louis IX installed a house of their order at his château of Fontainebleau. He chose Trinitarians as his chaplains, and was accompanied by them on his crusades. The Master of the Trinity was taken captive together with Saint Louis after the Battle of Mansurah.

In 1315, King Louis X passed a decree that abolished slavery and proclaimed that "France signifies freedom". The decree entailed that any slave setting foot on French ground should be freed. However some limited cases of slavery continued until the 17th century in some of France's Mediterranean harbors in Provence, and slavery was common in many of France's overseas territories until the 18th century and again for the first half of the 19th century.

Most aspects of serfdom were also de facto eliminated between 1315 and 1318. Louis X died two years after these events.

In 1318, King Philip V abolished serfdom in his domain.

However, according to the historian Sue Peabody, slavery continued in France in practice despite being formally banned under law. Peabody's study ‘There Are No Slaves in France’ concluded that Europeans have had a belief, dating to the 16th century, that slaves were automatically free upon reaching European soil, but that French sources often avoided using the term "slave" to refer to Black servants even when they lived under conditions of slavery. According to Peabody, French and other European slave owners benefited from legal grey areas relating to slaves on European soil.

=== Barbary slave trade ===
During the early modern age, France fell victim to the slave raids of the Barbary slave trade.

The Franco-Ottoman alliance, which lasted between 1536 and 1798, placed France in a different position than other European nations in the context. The Franco-Ottoman alliance formally protected France more than other nations from attacks of the corsairs, who formally were Ottoman subjects. In contrast to other European nations, France could complain over the corsairs to the Ottoman sultan, who would be obligated to take action because of the Franco-Ottoman alliance. The Ottoman sultan did not support Ottoman attacks on French ships or raids of French coasts, and in contrast to the attacks on many other nations, the attacks on French ships and coasts were formally considered illegal also by the Ottomans.

In practice however, the corsair states of North Africa were Ottoman in name only and did not necessarily respect the obligations of the Ottoman sultan, who had weak control over the provinces, and France was subjected to their attacks despite the Franco-Ottoman alliance.

During the 1550s, the French provinces of Provence and Languedoc were devastated by slave razzias by the corsairs, which resulted in French complaints to the Ottoman sultan, and the city of Marseille petitioned regent Catherine de' Medici as well as taking separate measures to liberate enslaved natives and protect their commerce vessels, and reported to have lost twelve galleons aside from a large number of smaller boats.

Sultan Suleiman I ordered the corsairs to leave French vessels alone in 1565, out of respect for the alliance. However, such orders from the Ottoman sultans only placed a slight inhibition on the corsairs in regard to France, rather than to protect them fully. There were several slave raids toward France, such as for example in Northern France close to Calais in 1620.

Among the French victims of the Barbary slave trade was Antoine Quartier.

=== The status of slaves from the colonies in Paris (18th-19th centuries) ===
Since the abolition of slavery in 1315, France was regarded as a "free territory" meaning that any enslaved person arriving in France could claim their freedom. Indeed, there is some evidence of enslaved people fleeing and being declared free by French tribunals. Such right to freedom was contested by slave-owners from the French colonies, who were keen to take their slaves along when traveling to the mainland. In an attempt to reduce the legal grey area and support colonial forces, from 1716 to 1762, the Admiralty published multiple edicts allowing slave-owners to legally keep control over their slaves by declaring them to the authorities. The royal police was then tasked with enforcing those edicts by tracking and arresting fugitive slaves in Paris. In 1777, Louis XVI published a new edict formally banning Blacks from entering the French territory. From then on, slave-owners traveling from the colonies had to entrust their slaves to a "depot of blacks" upon arrival, while blacks previously present on the French territory had to be registered with the admiralty and to carry with them the proof of such registration, called "cartouche". A specific police taskforce for Blacks was created to verify the legality of black people in France. The enforcement of this new regime however remained imperfect.

After the French revolution, the Republic enshrined the principle of "free territory" in its laws in 1791, 3 years before abolishing slavery in its colonies, thereby allowing all enslaved entering the French territory to obtain their freedom. However, when Napoleon reintroduced slavery in 1802, he also repelled the "free territory" principle and reinstated the specialised police force from 1777, this time with stricter enforcement measures.

== Slavery in the French colonies ==
The French colonial empire practiced slavery in its colonies. Slavery was essential to cheaply extract raw materials and scale large agricultural cultivation. In the mid-16th century, enslaved people were trafficked from Africa to the Caribbean by European mercantilists. Nor were New France, Louisiana, or French African colonies immune.

The French West India Company developed tobacco plantations in French colonies. The company had a monopoly on the slave trade from Senegal, which since 1658, belonged to the Company of Cape Verde and Senegal. The slave trade continued under the operation of the Compagnie du Sénégal from 1658 to 1709. The company traded slaves with the Hausa Kingdoms, Mali, and the Moors in Mauritania.

As of 1778, the French were trafficking approximately 13,000 African people as slaves to the French West Indies each year. Slavery was abolished by the revolutionary convention of 1794.

=== Slavery in New France ===
Slavery was practiced by the French North American colony of New France (covering part of modern Canada). By 1750, two thirds of the enslaved peoples in New France were Indigenous, but by 1834, most enslaved people were black.

=== Slave trade ===
The city of Nantes played a main role in the slave trade, i.e. the highest number of expeditions started from this harbor: 1744 expeditions between the 17th and the 19th century out of a total of 4220 expeditions from France. Also Bordeaux (419 expeditions), La Rochelle (448 expeditions) and Le Havre (451 expeditions) outfitted large numbers of slave voyages.

=== Code Noir ===
In 1685, King Louis XIV passed the decree known as Code Noir (French pronunciation: [kɔd nwaʁ], Black Code). The code defined the conditions of slavery in the French colonial empire.

=== First abolition of slavery in the French colonies ===
The Society of the Friends of the Blacks was founded in Paris in 1788, and remained active until 1793, during the midst of the French Revolution. It was led by Jacques Pierre Brissot, who frequently received advice from British abolitionist Thomas Clarkson, who led the abolitionist movement in Great Britain. At the beginning of 1789, the Society had 141 members.

The second general abolition of slavery took place on 4 February 1794, during the convention, the first elected Assembly of the First Republic (1792–1804), under the leadership of Maximilien Robespierre. Abbé Grégoire and the Society of the Friends of the Blacks were part of the abolitionist movement, which had laid important groundwork in building anti-slavery sentiment in the metropole. Another decisive reason for the sudden abolition of slavery was the success of the Slave Revolt in Saint-Domingue (Haitian Revolution).

The Law of 4 February 1794 abolished slavery in all French territories and possessions in the Americas and Caribbean, although slavery was maintained in the Mascarene Islands. The first article of the law stated that "Slavery was abolished" in the French colonies, while the second article stated that "slave-owners would be indemnified" with financial compensation for the value of their slaves. The French constitution passed in 1795 included a declaration of the rights of man, which abolishes slavery.

=== Re-introduction of slavery in the French colonies in 1802 ===
Napoleon re-introduced slavery in sugarcane-growing colonies through the Law of 20 May 1802. Slavery would be legal in French colonies until 1847.

=== Second end of slavery in the French colonies ===
In 1815, the Congress of Vienna declared its opposition to the slave trade. In 1818, the slave trade was banned in France. On July 18–19, 1845, the Mackau Laws were passed, which paved the way towards the abolition of slavery in France.

On April 27, 1848, the Proclamation of the Abolition of Slavery in the French Colonies was made. The effective abolition was enacted with the Decree abolishing Slavery of 27 April 1848.

The island of Martinique was the first French overseas colony where the decree actually came into force, on 23 May 1848.

Gabon was founded as a settlement for emancipated slaves.

The abolition didn't extend to all colonies, though. Several French colonies, especially in West Africa, had a practice of domestic slavery ("esclavage de case"), which was maintained in some cases until the 20th century. This includes Soudan (until 1894) or Senegal until 1904.

== Modern day ==
- In 1890, took place the Brussels Conference Act – a collection of anti-slavery measures to put an end to the slave trade on land and sea, especially in the Congo Basin, the Ottoman Empire, and the East African coast.
- In 1904, the International Agreement for the suppression of the White Slave Traffic was signed in Paris. Only France, the Netherlands and Russia extend the treaty to the whole extent of their colonial empires with immediate effect.
- In 1926, the Slavery Convention is ratified by France and other nations.

Even though slavery has been prohibited for more than one century, many criminal organizations continue to practice human trafficking and the slave trade. For this reason, on 25 July 2013, France recognized modern-day slavery as a crime punishable by up to 30 years in jail.

== Memorial Associations ==
See French public institution Fondation pour la mémoire de l'esclavage in French (originally founded on 5 janvier 2004 under the name Comité national pour la mémoire et l'histoire de l'esclavage i.e National Committee for the Memory and the History of slavery).

A permanent structure in June 1999, known as “Le Comité marche ‘98” (The March ’98 Committee) has been created with the objectives to promote processes of recognition and reparation about the past actions of the French government on the issue of slavery in its former colonies. The second aim of the organization is also to preserve the memory of the abolition .

This association was initially chaired by Serge Romana, a geneticist and leading activist for the recognition of the history of Guadeloupean slavery. A first step in the achievement of the committee’s objectives came with the Taubira Law of 10 May 2001. This law recognizes slavery as a crime against humanity. A second crucial step was taken with the adoption of the Overseas Real Equality Act of 14 February 2017, which established 23 May as the commemorative date for the victims of colonial slavery. The association continues to promote annual commemorations known as “Feasts of Brotherhood and Reconciliation” or “Limié Ba Yo” (which translates as “Let’s put them in the spotlight”) every year on 23 May.

== See also ==
- Slavery in the British and French Caribbean
- Slavery in the United States
- Slavery in Haiti
- Affranchi
- Race in France
- Slavery museum (France)
