= Fabrice Hybert =

French visual artist (born 1961)

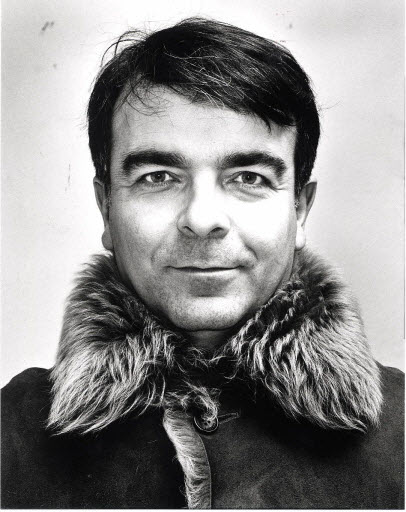
- Self portrait of Hyber, 2005
- Born: 12 July 1961 (age 65); Luçon, Vendée, France
- Education: Nantes School of Art
- Style: Visual artist; assembly; video; painting; drawing
- Awards: Golden Lion (1997), Officier des Arts et des Lettres (2012), member of the Académie des Beaux-Arts (2018)

Fabrice Hybert (born 12 July 1961), also known as Fabrice Hyber, is a French visual artist. His work engages with themes from nature, economics, commerce, and science in drawing, sculpture, installations, and video.

Hyber was elected to the Académie des Beaux-Arts in 2018. In March 2022, he was appointed chairman of the Centre national des arts plastiques (France) by order of the Minister of Culture.

Hybert has stated that his work explores “the enormous reservoir of the possible”. In 2004, he began to refer to himself as Fabrice Hyber.

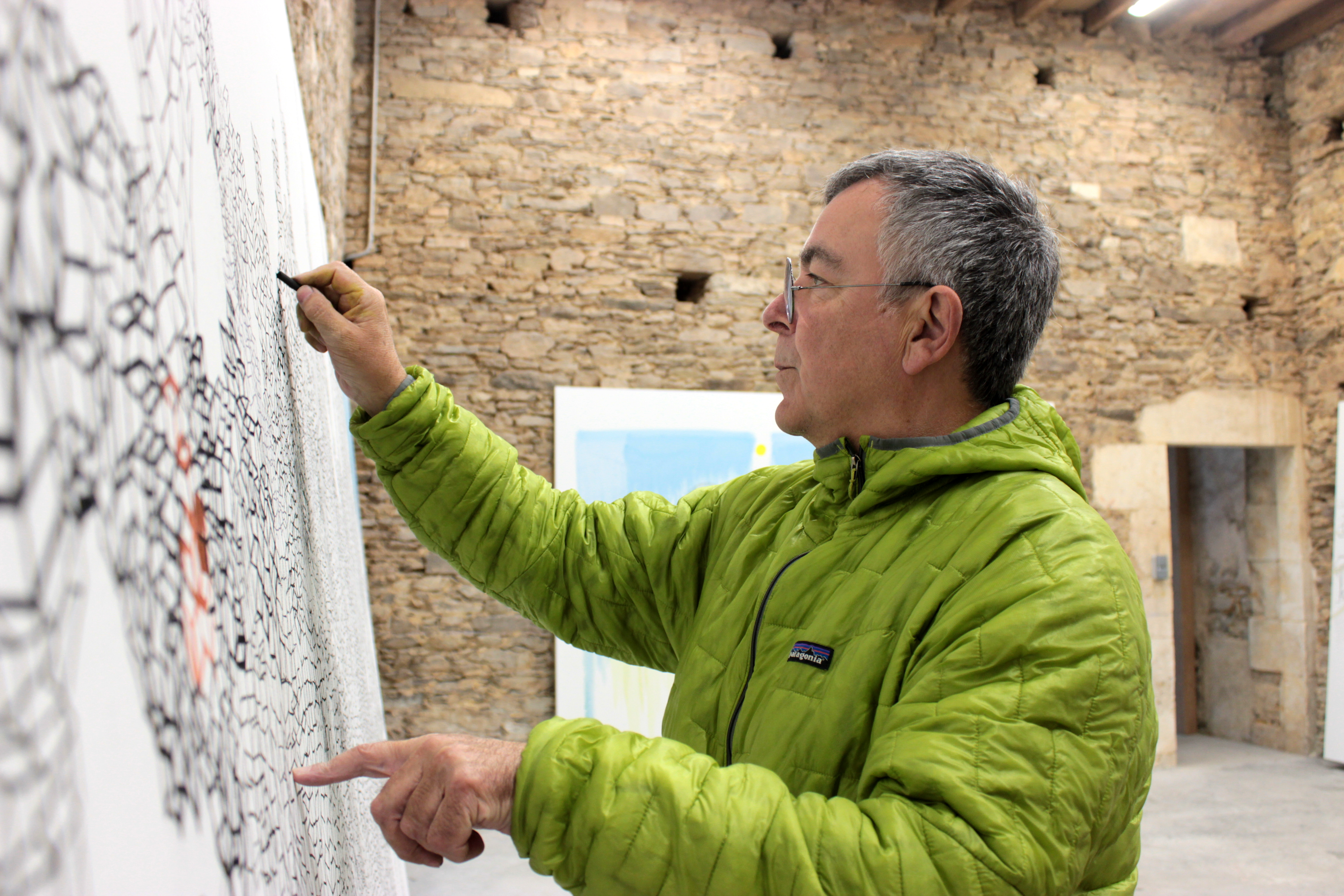
Fabrice Hyber drawing in his workshop (2022)

== Early life and education ==
Hybert was born in Luçon, Vendée on 12 July 1961. After spending his childhood in Vendée, Hybert studied mathematics and physics before enrolling in art studies. From 1979 to 1985, he studied at the Nantes School of Fine Arts.

== Career ==
In 1981, Hybert produced his first painting, Square meter of lipstick. In 1984, it was shown at the International Drawing Biennial of Saint-Étienne. That same year he presented his first solo exhibition, Mutation, in Nantes.

Environmental themes are frequently present in his work. In 2000, he was commissioned to create a project for the Arc de Triomphe. In 2001, Sidaction commissioned him to create L'Artère, installed in the Parc de la Villette, which was developed between 2002 and 2006.

In 2007, he installed Le Cri, l'Écrit in the Jardin du Luxembourg, a public commission commemorating the end of slavery in France.

Hyber designed sculpture gardens in Japan and Texas. He collaborated with the architectural firm Jakob + MacFarlane on the Euronews headquarters in Lyon (2015). In 2018, he produced painted decorations for the glass roof of the Parisian palace Lutetia. He also produced "Les Deux Chênes" for Beaupassage from the double molding of a three-hundred-year-old tree from the Vendée valley.

In 2021, Hyber became ambassador of the “ONF-Agir pour la forêt” fund.

Hyber frequently incorporates scientific themes into his work. He has worked on projects connected with the Institut Pasteur. In 2007, he collaborated with the American biotechnologist Robert S. Langer on the theme of stem cells, as well as with the Institut Pasteur and Professor Olivier Schwartz. With the COVID-19 pandemic, he explored themes related to viruses.

Hyber established partnerships with companies early in his career. He founded the SARL UR: Unlimited Responsibility in 1994, open to other creators. One of UR's objectives is to fund artistic projects.

In 1995, the Musée d'Art moderne de Paris presented the “Hybertmarché” exhibition in collaboration with the University of Lünebourg, involving Hyber and UR company.

Hyber collaborated with a spirits company in 2021 and with a luxury leather goods designer in 2022.

== Selected projects ==
=== The POFs ===
Beginning in 1991, Hyber developed what he calls POFs (Prototypes of in-operation objects) inspired by everyday life. Examples include Endless Staircase, the Swing or the Square Balloon.

In 2018, the Maison des POF was created as part of the percent for art for the new building of the Nantes Art School.

=== L’Homme de Bessines ===
As a commission for the town of Bessines (Deux-Sèvres) in 1991, Hyber dispersed six bronze figures painted green in the village. At a height of 87 centimetres (34 in), each sculpture is pierced by eleven holes from which jets of water shoot out. The sculpture has been reproduced in several hundred copies, of varying sizes and appearances.

=== Eau d’or, eau dort, Odor and Spiral TV ===
Invited to use the French pavilion at the 47th Venice Biennale in 1997, Hyber created Eau d'Or, Eau Dort, Odor, an experimental filming studio with the participation of Jean Rouch and the public. The project received a Golden Lion award.

The Spiral TV project produced for the Wacoal Art Center in Tokyo in 1999 explored similar themes.

=== Inconnu.net ===
From September to November 2000, Hyber deployed a belt of a hundred birch trees around the Arc de Triomphe, supported by the inconnu.net website.

=== L'Artère, le jardin des dessins ===
In 2001, to mark the 20th anniversary of the appearance of AIDS, the Sidaction association launched a call for projects for the creation of a commemorative monument. Hyber's project was an ensemble made up of ceramics designed by the artist and produced in Monterrey, Mexico. Produced from 2002 to 2006, the work installed in the Parc de la Villette is described as a rhizomatic storyboard.

=== Le Cri, L'Écrit ===
Announced in 2006 by President Chirac, this public work was dedicated to the end of slavery in France. The 3.7m high polychrome bronze sculpture was completed in 2007.

=== C’Hyber(t) Rallies ===
Hybert developed the first “Hyber(t) Rally” in Tokyo in 2001. The project invites spectators to take part in a treasure hunt to find objects hidden in everyday spaces. It has been duplicated in other locales.

== Collections ==
=== Public collections (selection) ===
- Museum of Contemporary Art, Los Angeles
- Centre Pompidou
- MUDAM
- Museum of Contemporary Art, Antwerp
- Herzliya Museum of Contemporary Art
- Frac des Pays de la Loire
- CAPC musée d'art contemporain de Bordeaux

== Exhibitions ==
=== Solo exhibitions (selection) ===
2016

- « L’entier » par Fabrice Hyber, Cyrille Putman et galerie quatre, Arles, France

2020

- Habiter la forêt, Nathalie Obadia Gallery, Paris, France

2021

- Frisson d'Hyber, Gilles Drouault, galerie/multiples, Paris, France
- Fresh Air, RX gallery, New York, United States
- L'Artère 2021, La Villette, Paris, France

2022

- Limited Edition hyberFournet, Camille Fournet’s shop, Paris, France
- L'Homme de Bessines, Palais Royal, Paris, France
- POF, Lasécu, Lille, France

2024

- La forêt et L’amitié, installation métro Shanghai, China
- Humeurs, Villa Cavrois, Croix, Lille, France

=== Collective exhibitions (selection) ===
2004

- F2004@Shanghai, Année de la France en China, La Fabrique, Shanghai

2019

- Coup de foudre, with Nathalie Talec, Foundation EDF, Paris
- Nous les arbres, Fondation Cartier

2020

- Habiter la forêt, Obadia Gallery Paris, France

2021

- Napoléon ? Encore !, Army Museum (Paris), Paris, France
- Trees, Power Station of Art, Shanghai, China

2022

- Vous êtes un arbre, Les Franciscaines, Deauville, France
- Petit précipité subjectif d’une histoire des graines, Le 104, Paris, France

2023

- Au temps du sida, œuvres, récits et entrelacs, Museum of modern and contemporary art of Strasbourg, MAMCS, Strasbourg, France

2024

- L’Homme de bois, Travel in Nantes, 13e edition, Nantes, France

== Appendices ==
=== Bibliography ===
==== Monographs ====
- Frederic Bougle, 1-1 = 2 Entretiens avec Fabrice Hybert, Nantes, Éditions Joca Seria, 1992-1994
- Pascal Rousseau, Fabrice Hybert, Paris, Hazan, 1999
- Guy Tortosa, POF HYBERT, Paris, UR éditions, 1999
- Thierry Laurent, Il est interdit de mourir, Paris, Au même titre éditions, 2003
- Fabrice Hyber, Richesses, Paris, Éditions Jannink, 2004
- Bernard Marcadé, Baert de Baere, Pierre Giquel, Hyber, Paris, Flammarion, 2009.
- Philippe Forest, Bernard Marcadé, Olivier Schwartz, Yves Jammet, L'Artère - Le Jardin des dessins, Nantes, Éditions Cécile Defaut, 2009.
- Gilles Coudert, Alice Dautry, Pascal Rousseau, Olivier Schwartz, Fabrice Hyber Sans gêne livre DVD, Paris, Après éditions, 2012.
- Donatien Grau, Hans Ulrich Obrist, Hyber… Hyber, Paris, Bernard Chauveau éditeur, 2014.

==== Catalogs of personal exhibitions ====
- Pierre Giquel, Fabrice Hybert Mutation, Nantes, La Maison de l'avocat, 1986.
- Guy Tortosa, Pierre Giquel, Fabrice Hybert, Direction régionale des affaires culturelles du Limousin, 1987.
- Jean-Louis Froment, Pierre Giquel, Catherine Strasser, Fabrice Hybert, œuvres de 1981 à 1993, CapcMusée d'Art contemporain de Bordeaux, 1993.
- Bernard Ceysson, Friedemann Malsch, Plus lourd à l'intérieur, Éditions du musée d'Art moderne de Saint-Étienne, 1995.
- Jean-Pierre Changeur, Alice Dautry, Annick Perrot, Olivier Schwartz, Fabrice Hyber à l'Institut Pasteur, Paris, Institut Pasteur, 2010.
- Jacqueline Frydman, Pascal Rousseau, Fabrice Hyber, Moscow, Maison de la photographie de Moscou, 2010.
- Nicolas Setari, POF Prototypes d'objets en fonctionnement 1991-2012, Vitry-sur-Seine, MAC VAL, 2012.
- Olivier Kaeppelin, Bernard Marcadé, Pascal Rousseau, Essentiel peintures homéopathiques, Saint-Paul de Vence, Fondatien Maeght, 2012.

==== Others ====
- Bourriaud, Nicolas. 2002. Relational aesthetics, Documents sur l'art. Dijon: Les presses du réel.
