= Léonie d'Aunet =

French writer, playwright and explorer (1820–1879)

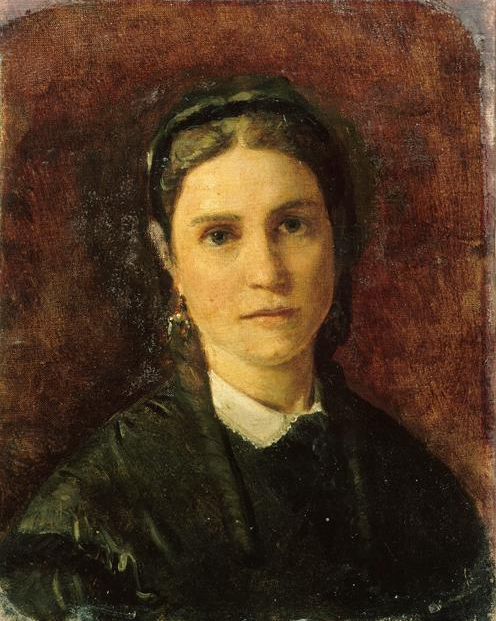
- Born: 2 July 1820; Paris
- Died: 3 March 1879 (aged 58); Paris
- Other name: Léonie d'Aunet Biard
- Occupations: Author, playwright
- Years active: 1839–1879
- Known for: travelogue, novels, plays

Léonie Thévenot d'Aunet (French: [leɔni tevəno donɛ]; 2 July 1820 – 3 March 1879) was a French author, novelist, playwright and Arctic explorer.

== Biography ==
D'Aunet was born to Auguste-François-Michel Thévenot d'Aunet, an officer of a military squadron from Québec, and d'Henriette-Joséphine d'Orémieulx. She was educated at the Institute Fauvel. She married the painter François-Auguste Biard (1798–1882) on 23 July 1840 in Paris.

In 1838 the corvette La Recherche (1838–1839), under the command of Joseph Paul Gaimard, undertook the La Recherche Expedition to Spitzbergen, to explore the Arctic. D'Aunet was by this time already living with Biard, and agreed to persuade her future husband to accept the position of official painter for the expedition, on condition that she be allowed to accompany him. She traveled with Biard across Belgium, Holland and Norway, before leaving Hammerfest, the northernmost city in Scandinavia, and returned after spending several weeks at Spitzbergen. She was the first woman to participate in a scientific expedition to the northern regions, On return, her letters were published, in serial form, in Revue de Paris.

In autumn 1843 she became acquainted with Victor Hugo, whom she most likely met at the salon of the Caribbean-born celebrity Fortunée Hamelin. Their relationship eased Hugo's life, inspiring him to the numerous poems of which one finds trace in Les Contemplations. Her seven-year liaison was interrupted by Victor Hugo's exile after the coup d'état by Napoleon III on December 2, 1851.

On Monday April 1844, their relations became public knowledge, when on July 5, 1845, she was surprised with the writer in bed in a hotel on the Passage Saint-Roch. Léonie was arrested and taken to the prison at Saint-Lazare. The King, Louis-Philippe I, interceded in the case of Hugo, and bought off the husband with a career-changing commission for wall paintings for Versailles. Hugo was let know he should make himself scarce, and left the city.

After two months, Léonie was transferred to the Convent of the Ladies of Saint Michael, where Adèle Foucher (wife of Victor Hugo), who was glad to see a competitor to Juliette Drouet, visited her.

== Literary career ==
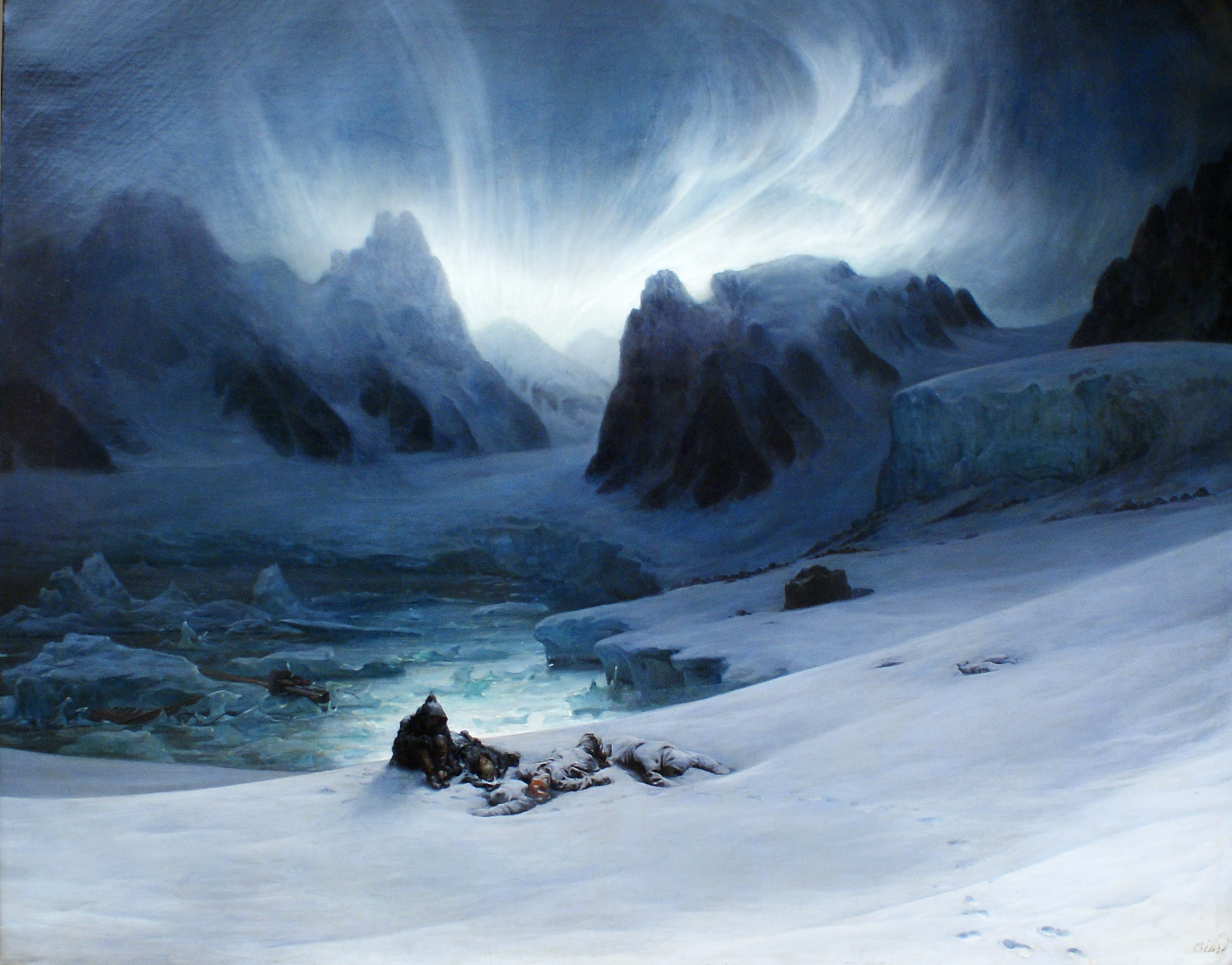
Painting by Biard painted after the Spitzbergen expedition

On September 10, 1845, she entered the convent of the Augustines, where she remained for about six months. Once released, she made frequent visits to Hugo's home. Adèle Hugo helped her, in exchange for clothing advice and interior decoration, to launch her literary career. Some even affirmed that most of her books were due to Victor Hugo When Hugo left for exile, Adèle dissuaded her from joining him, but their correspondence did not cease. He, feeling responsible for the children of Léonie, upon his return from exile, regularly sent her money until his death.

She entered into the literary career under her maiden name, after her legal separation from her husband in 1855. She began by publishing, as a book with Hachette, the account of her journey to Spitzbergen under the title of Voyage d'une femme au Spitzberg. This work was followed by the Un Mariage en province (1856), published in La Presse; The Vengeance (1857), Étiennette, Silvère, The Secret (1859), The Heritage of the Marquis d'Elsigny for the Library of the Railways from Hachette Publishers, and which earned her a distinguished place in the world of letters.

== Playwright ==
D'Aunet's drama Jane Osborn was performed by Lucie Mabire, on 30 January 1856 at the Porte de Saint-Martin theatre. She published serials in Le Siècle, Le Courrier de Paris, Le Journal pour tous and L'Événement, and wrote the fashion column at the magazine Les Modes parisiennes under the pseudonym "Thérèse de Blaru".

== Family ==
Her son, Biard d'Aunet, married a daughter of the Lestang-Parade family. Her daughter, Marie Biard, wrote under the pseudonym Étincelle ("Sparkle") and successively married Viscount Peyronny and Baron Double de Saint-Lambert.

== Works ==
- Works on WorldCat
- Une place à la cour, comédie en 1 acte, Poissy, Arbieu, 1854.
- Voyage d'une femme au Spitzberg, Paris, Hachette, 1854.
- Jane Osborn, drame en quatre actes, Paris, A. Taride, 1855.
- Un mariage en province, Paris, W. Gerhard, 1856.
- Étiennette; Silvère; Le Secret, nouvelles, Paris, L. Hachette, 1859.
- L'Héritage du marquis d'Elvigny. Les deux Légendes d'Hardenstein, Paris, L. Hachette, 1863.
- Une vengeance, Paris, Hachette, 1857.
