= International Slavery Museum =

Museum in Liverpool, England

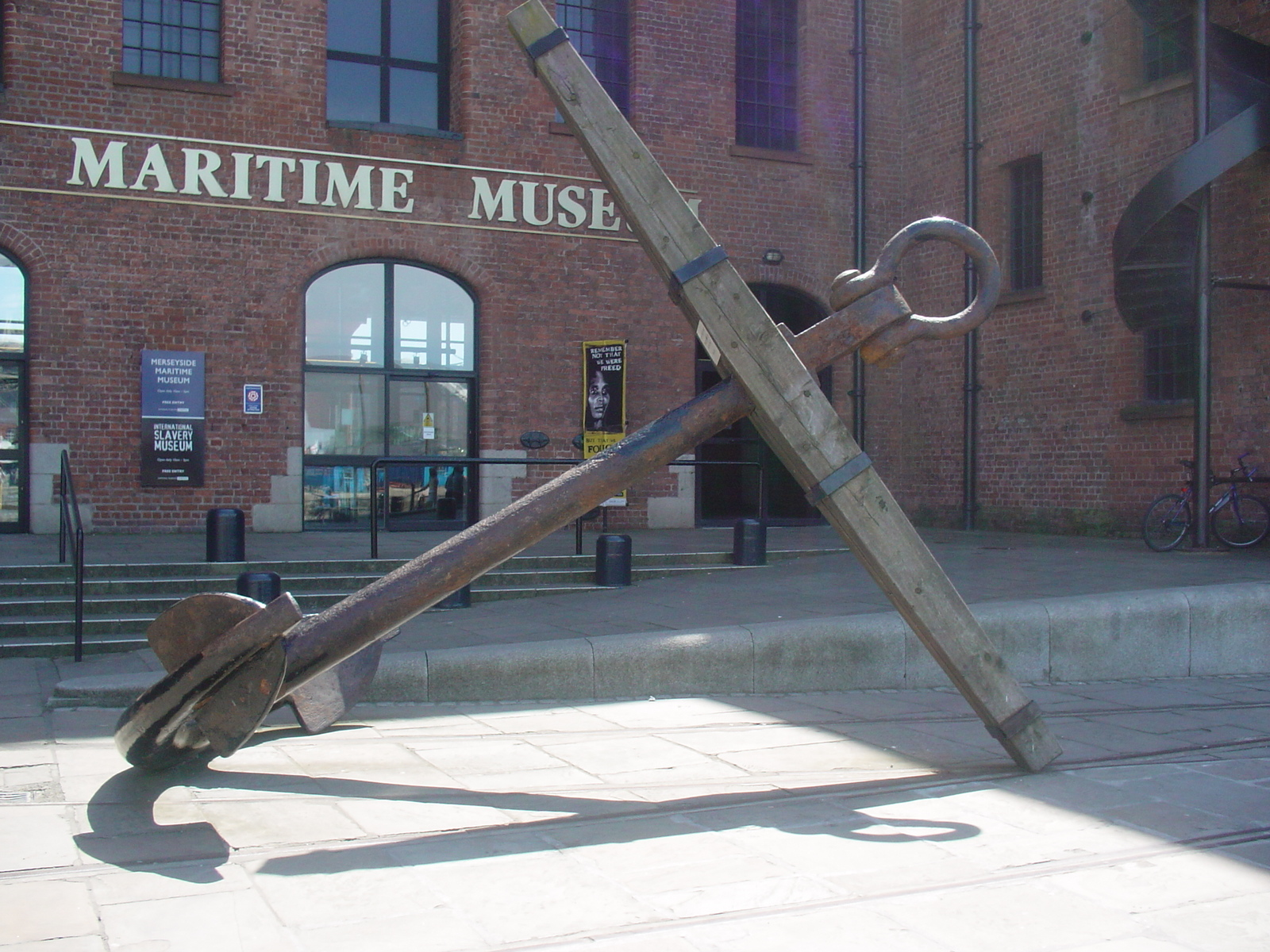
- Main entrance to the museum
- Established: 23 August 2007
- Location: Albert Dock, Liverpool, England, United Kingdom
- Coordinates: 53.401°N 2.993°W
- Type: Slavery
- Visitors: 396,877 (2019)
- Website: International Slavery Museum

The International Slavery Museum is a museum located in Liverpool, UK, that focuses on the history and legacy of the transatlantic slave trade. The museum, which forms part of the Merseyside Maritime Museum, consists of three main galleries which focus on the lives of people in West Africa, their eventual enslavement, and their continued fight for freedom. Additionally the museum discusses slavery in the modern day as well as topics on racism and discrimination.

== History ==
Originally part of the Merseyside Maritime Museum, which opened in 1980, the history of the slave trade was originally discussed as part of the city's maritime history shortly before a dedicated Transatlantic Slavery gallery was created in 1994 to better explore Liverpool's historic role in the slave trade. Notable among campaigners for the establishment of an international slavery museum in 1992 was Dorothy Kuya. By the early 2000s international interest in the exhibition and a high volume of visitors led to the decision for a museum specially dedicated to the history of slavery to be set up so as to better explain slavery and its legacy.

The new museum opened on 23 August 2007, the date of the annual International Day for the Remembrance of the Slave Trade and its Abolition marking the beginning of the slave uprising in Saint-Domingue. The year 2007 was particularly significant as it was the bicentenary of the United Kingdom's Slave Trade Act 1807, which abolished the slave trade (though not slavery itself) inside the British Empire. The Merseyside Maritime Museum used to house a Transatlantic Slavery Gallery. Phase 1 of the International Slavery Museum involved relocating current exhibitions to the third floor of the museum and adding new displays, which doubled the space dedicated to the subject.

The East Gallery features approximately 400 annotated songs pertaining to the experience of slavery and the music of Africa and the slave-descended African diaspora.

The museum was awarded £50,000 in March 2018 to buy and restore the painting 'Am Not I A Man and a Brother'. The painting dates from around 1800 and is based upon a design commissioned by the Committee for the Abolition of the Slave Trade. The image is considered to be one of the first instances of a logo designed for a political cause, and was used on the pottery of Josiah Wedgwood.

In 2023, Michelle Charters was announced as the new Head of the museum.

In 2024 it was announced that extensive renovations were to take place, incorporating the former Dock Traffic Office, now the Dr Martin Luther King Jr building. which adjoins the Maritime Museum. The two buildings are to be linked by an iron and glass bridge.

The museum closed for renovations at the start of 2025 and is due to reopen in 2029.

== See also ==
- Slavery museum (France)
- Whitney Plantation Historic District (US)
- United States National Slavery Museum (planned, abandoned)

== Bibliography ==
Daniel Brown, "Songs of Slavery", Index on Censorship, Volume 36, Number 1, 2007, p. 138–140.
