= Michelle Charters =

British activist and museum head

Michelle Charters OBE is an activist and museum head known for her work to make black history and experiences more widely known.

== Career ==
Charters was a founder of Toxteth's Kuumba Imani Millennium Centre in 2006 and its CEO until 2024. She was the Chair of the Slavery Streets Panel, which put up plaques to commemorate the Liverpool's role in the history of slavery. Charters founded and chaired the Merseyside Black History Month Group. She was a Trustee of the Everyman and Playhouse Theatres.

After being introduced to the museum by Dorothy Kuya, Charters worked at National Museums Liverpool from 1994. She became a Trustee in 2018.

In 2023, Charters was announced as the head of the International Slavery Museum in Liverpool.

She was appointed an Officer of the Order of the British Empire (OBE) in the 2024 Birthday Honours for services to the community in Liverpool.
