= Balthild of Chelles =

Wife of Clovis II, Queen consort of Burgundy and Neustria, Christian saint

Saint Balthild
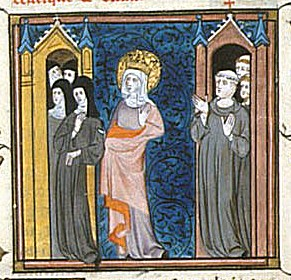
- A medieval depiction of Balthild
- Born: 626 or 627
- Died: 30 January 680 (aged 52–54)
- Venerated in: Catholic Church; Eastern Orthodox Church
- Canonized: c. 860 by Pope Nicholas I
- Major shrine: Abbey of Chelles outside of Paris
- Feast: The new Roman martyrology says her feast day is January 30, as it was celebrated in France.

Balthild (c. 626 – 30 January 680) (/ˈbɔːltɪld/; Old English: Bealdhild, 'bold sword' or 'bold spear), also spelled Bathilda, Bauthieult or Baudour, was queen consort of Neustria and Burgundy by marriage to Clovis II, the King of Neustria and Burgundy (639–658), and regent during the minority of her son, Chlothar III. Her hagiography was intended to further her successful candidature for sainthood.

Tradition represents her as an Anglo-Saxon who was originally of noble birth, perhaps a relative of Ricberht of East Anglia, the last pagan king of East Anglia, although Pierre Fournet regards this as doubtful. Ricberht was ousted by Sigeberht, who had spent time as an exile in the Frankish court, during which he had converted to Christianity. Sigeberht was established as the rightful heir to the throne with Frankish help.

== Hagiographic tradition ==
According to Vita S. Bathildis, Balthild was born circa 626–627. She was beautiful, intelligent, modest and attentive to the needs of others. Balthild was sold into slavery as a young girl and served in the household of Erchinoald, the mayor of the palace of Neustria to Clovis. Erchinoald, whose wife had died, was attracted to Balthild and wanted to marry her, but she did not want to marry him. She hid herself away and waited until Erchinoald had remarried. Later, possibly because of Erchinoald, Clovis noticed her and asked for her hand in marriage.

Even as queen, Balthild remained humble and modest. She is famous for her charitable service and generous donations. From her donations, the abbeys of Corbie and Chelles were founded; it is likely that others such as Jumièges, Jouarre and Luxeuil were also founded by the queen. She provided support for Claudius of Besançon and his abbey in the Jura Mountains.

Balthild bore Clovis three children, all of whom became kings: Clotaire, Childeric and Theuderic.

When Clovis died (between 655 and 658), his eldest son Clotaire succeeded to the throne. His mother Balthild acted as the queen regent. As queen, she was a capable stateswoman. She abolished the practice of trading Christian slaves and strove to free children who had been sold into slavery. Balthild and Eligius, according to Dado, "worked together on their favourite charity, the buying and freeing of slaves". After a power struggle with mayor Ebroin, Balthild withdrew to her favourite Abbey of Chelles near Paris.

Balthild died on 30 January 680 and was buried at the Abbey of Chelles, east of Paris. Her Vita was written soon after her death, probably by one of the community of Chelles. The Vita Baldechildis/Vita Bathildis reginae Francorum in Monumenta Germania Historica, Scriptores Rerum Merovincarum, as with most of the vitae of royal Merovingian-era saints, provides some useful details for the historian. Her official cult began when her remains were transferred from the former abbey to a new church, in 833, under the auspices of Louis the Pious. Balthild was canonised by Pope Nicholas I, around 200 years after her death.

== Other sources ==
Sainted Women of the Dark Ages states that Balthild "was not the first Merovingian queen to begin her career in servitude". Other Merovingian queens who arose from servile status include Fredegund, the mother of Clothaire II; Bilichild, the wife of Theudebert of Austrasia; and possibly Nanthild, the mother of Clovis II. However, research has shown that the slavery of Balthild was probably an invention and that she in fact belonged to an upper-class Anglo-Saxon family.

During the minority of Clotaire III, she had to deal with the attempted coup of Grimoald, the major domus of Austrasia, but she enjoyed the continued support of her former master Erchinoald, who became a sort of 'political mentor' to her throughout her marriage to Clovis II.

According to some historians, Balthild's creation of and involvement with monasteries was perhaps an act to "balance or even neutralize the efforts of the aristocratic opposition". By installing her supporters as bishops of different sees, she gained even greater power as a ruler.

According to the Vita Sancti Wilfrithi by Stephen of Ripon, Bathild was a ruthless ruler, in conflict with the bishops and perhaps responsible for several assassinations. However, the bishop she so famously murdered, Dalfinus, is not listed as a bishop of Lyon. The story may have been written to embellish the life of Wilfrid.

A fragment of an apron thought to have belonged to Balthild is taken by scholars as evidence for her piety and frugality. Her devotion to her faith and forsaking of luxury is evident from a cross embroidered on the apron in silk, rather than gold thread.

== Balthild seal matrix ==
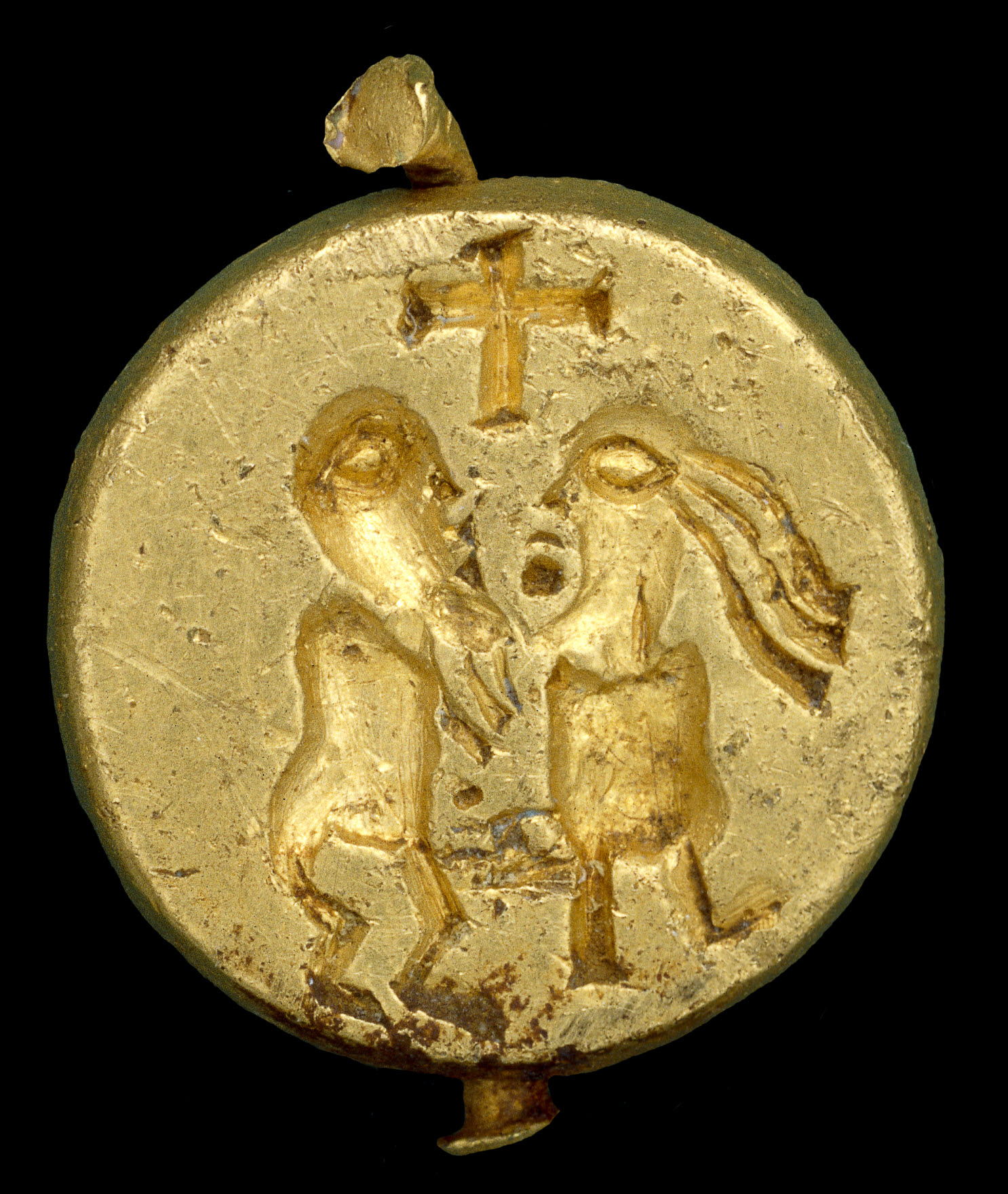
The Balthild seal matrix

A gold seal matrix, which was originally attached to a seal-ring, was uncovered in 1999 by a metal detector in a field in Postwick, 4.5 miles (7.2 km) east of Norwich, in Norfolk. One side shows a woman's face and her name BALDAHILDIS in Frankish lettering. The other side portrays two naked figures, a man and a woman, embracing one another beneath a cross.

In Merovingian Gaul, one side of the seal was intended to be used with official documents. The other side would have been used only for private papers. It is uncertain why the seal matrix came to East Anglia. It may have been a gift, or a representative of Balthild may have worn it as a form of identification. It has also been suggested that the seal matrix was returned to Balthild's kin after she died. Paul Fouracre of the University of Manchester speculated that the seal may belong to a different Baldahildis entirely. The seal matrix is in the keeping of the Norwich Castle Museum.

== Chemise of Balthild ==
Balthild's ornate chemise both expresses her dedication to the church, as well as her status as a queen to Clovis II. The sleeveless tabard was probably crafted by either Balthid herself, or nuns of Chelles Abbey, and measures 84 centimetres (33 in) wide and 117 centimetres (46 in) tall. It intended to loosely hang over the front and back of the body over a dress, although the back portion is currently lost. The garment consists of simple linen as a gesture of humility towards the church, as linen was a fabric commonly worn by lower classes of the time. The silken details make up a large bejewelled Christian cross 17.5 centimetres (6.9 in) tall, small human and bird portraits, as well as several patterned rings around the collar mimicking studded golden necklaces. These embroidered necklaces were sewn in the exact likeness of the jewellery Balthild wore during her status as queen, and were also a symbol of Balthild's devotion, trading her actual jewellery for sewn replica as a member of Chelles Abbey.

There are conflicting claims on this history of this garment, centred on whether it was ever worn by Balthild herself in life, in death, or at all. The common argument is that it was a burial shirt that followed Balthild into her tomb. This is challenged by claims that the shirt was worn frequently by Balthild during her life in service at Chelles but not during her death. These arguments have surfaced due to the dubious history of the dress and Balthild's body, which have been disturbed multiple times muddying attempts at accurate documentation. Balthild's body and dress have been relocated two documented times. The first time they were moved, they were moved behind the Chelles Abbey altar as relics in 833, perhaps in hopes of attracting Christians on pilgrimages. The dress was said to be found once again hidden inside a sixteenth-century reliquary in attempts of saving it from destruction during the French Revolution.
