= Slavery in Merovingian Francia =

Although Merovingian Francia is not considered a slave society, slaves were, nonetheless, present throughout the entirety of the dynasty and well into the Carolingian period and beyond. In the 7th century, however, the sale and trade of Christians within Frankish borders was abolished by Queen Balthild, herself a former slave.

== Slavery transforms to serfdom ==
Slavery was gradually phased out and replaced by serfdom in Francia, a process that begun in the 5th century and continued, but was not completed, during the Merovingian era. In Roman Gaul, the land estates of the Roman country villas in Gaul had been worked by slave laborers called ancillae (sing. ancilla) or servi (sing. servus), who worked the land of the landowner, the dominus. When Roman rule in Gaul was replaced by the migrating Germanic tribes in settling in Gaul in the 5th century, the Roman villa estates started to transition to become feudal estates, and the transition of slavery to serfdom was a part of this. The slavery system was dependent upon a strong central power and legal enforcement, which was no longer possible in the Post Roman world, where an estate was now forced to be self-sufficient, and rely on cooperation. In order to keep their labor force and ensure their cooperation, the landowners started to manumit their slaves and give their former slaves, called coloni or servi casati, their own land, known as mansi, in exchange for working also on the landowner's own land, demesne.

When the former slaves were given their own land, they could no longer be sold or bought as property, but was liberated and referred to as franci or coloni. As free peasants with their own land the former slave laborers were motivated to work better for the landowner; and when they were free to marry and leave their land as inheritance to their children, the labor force of the landowner started to reproduce itself instead of the landowner being responsible for supplying new laborers (via slave purchases). The method of freeing the slaves and giving them land in exchange for working duty on the landowners land, was seen as more efficient by the landowners, since the free laborers were motivated to work and did not have to be supervised; and while slavery was not abolished, the new labor method became so popular among the landowners that by the 7th century, the rural slave laborers had been almost completely replaced by free serf peasant laborers, and slavery reduced to urban house slaves.

However, the transformation from rural slavery to serfdom did not eradicate slavery, only marginalized it. Urban house slaves continued to be popular for centuries after the eradication of rural slavery, and were phased out in favor of free workers much slower, disappearing earlier in the North and slower in the South.

== Nature of Merovingian slavery ==
Even though “(a)ny reconstruction of the slave trade during this period is bound to be highly speculative” due to the paucity of extant medieval sources, scholars have advanced some general characteristics of Merovingian slavery. For one, a distinction must be made between forced slavery and voluntary slavery. The status of freedom throughout the Middle Ages, including the Merovingian period, was not as defined as it is today; freedom was considered a bargaining chip by which to attain a better quality of life or economic stability. Legally this form of slavery was not hereditary whereas imposed or forced slavery, such as through capture, was. Merovingian slavery is further characterized by a preference for female, domestic slaves. This may have been a result of the considerable low status attributed to those who served and/or the desire for multiple types of labor production, such as domestic and sexual. In fact, wars were often fought to fulfill the demand for slaves in early medieval Europe and sources show “women and their children as the intended victims of war”.

Balthild, for example, is captured in England and sold, for a cheap price, to Erchinoald. Finally, since Merovingian France was not a slave society, slavery was, in many ways, arbitrary. Which is to say, slaves and servants existed at the low end of the social scale, “regardless of where they sat on the spectrum of unfreedom” The arbitrariness of Merovingian slavery is all the more apparent in that, unlike other forms of slavery, such as ancient, modern, or Islamic/Mediterranean, it was neither racial, cultural, or religious. It was, at least, until Balthild outlawed the sale of Christians. As such, scholars, when considering slavery in early medieval Europe, prefer to ask: “Why were lords so keen to categorize some of their dependents as unfree, but not others? What added advantage did they think it would give them?” In other words, why were some considered slaves and others servants, when both shared a similar condition of servitude? More precisely, why such a distinction when dominants considered either condition of servitude equally debased?. Thus, a top-down approach to the study of slavery, in this specific context, is beneficial in order to understand what characterized someone as an enslaved person or free person.

== Slave queens ==
Five Frankish queens of the Merovingian dynasty have been identified as former slaves, though there may be more: Ingund, Fredegund, Bilichild, Nanthild, and Balthild. Of these women, Fredegund and Balthild are the best remembered; the first for her villainous attributes and the second for her saintly ones. Regardless of their historical reputation and legacy, all of these women rose dramatically through the ranks of Merovingian society, from the lowest echelon to the highest; likely examples of unparalleled social climbing in French history.

Scholars and medieval contemporaries have theorized as to why kings would select unfree women as their consorts. For contemporary chronicler and bishop Gregory of Tours, this habit signaled a lack of kingly virtue, declaring they “were marrying unworthy wives, and were themselves so worthless as to even marry slaves”. This is to say, slaves occupied such a demeaned position in Merovingian society as to impart their debased condition onto their spouses, especially when those spouses happened to be royal. Such a decision therefore must have been the result of whim or lust. In comparison, scholars believe the behavior of the kings was “not necessarily motivated by lust over reason”. In such, some contend that “their slave status, which kept them dependent on the good will of their husbands, made them the preferred confidantes of kings”. Others argue these marriages enabled Merovingian kings to display their power: in favoring a lowborn or unfree wife over one selected from the ranks of high society, the Merovingian kings indicated their distinctiveness. This is to say, “To select a bride without regard for her wealth or lineage was to signal one’s own power and security”. Still others suggest that these marriages demonstrated a form of practicality, useful when the first, legitimate wife proved sterile However, such marriages were exceptional and largely “outnumbered by the more normal alliances with princesses and noblewomen and rarely occurred before the mid-sixth century”

In the case of Balthild, it is possible that her former enslavement prompted her interest in reforming slavery, freeing captives and firming up who could be enslaved. Balthild’s attempts notwithstanding, slavery persisted in the Frankish kingdom, only slaves were now imported from Eastern Europe rather than captured locally. It is perhaps significant that no other slave queen is known, or recorded, to have attempted similar reforms.

== Creating "free" progeny ==
The ability to choose a slave for a queen was dependent on the right of Merovingian kings to exist, in many ways, above the law. Unlike other members of society, such as the aristocracy, who were subject to the Roman law that “…the offspring of unions of free men and servile women inherited the status of their mother,” the kings were themselves exempt. The children of kings, regardless of the current or previously enslaved condition of the mother, were legitimate and free. In this regard, the kings displayed further singularity “as they were not bound by the same social conventions that controlled the behavior of non-royal, aristocratic communities”
