= Slavery museum (France) =

Museum in France

In May 2016, President Francois Hollande announced the formation of a foundation to erect a national slavery and Atlantic slave trade memorial and museum ("un musée de l'esclavage") in Paris, France. Identifying the memorial and museum's purpose, Hollande said, “I wish to give to France an institution it still lacks, a foundation for the memory of the slave trade, slavery and its abolition”.

== See also ==
- Code Noir
- International Slavery Museum
- Whitney Plantation Historic District (USA)
- Mémorial ACTe (Guadeloupe, France)
