= François-Auguste Biard =

French painter (1799–1882)

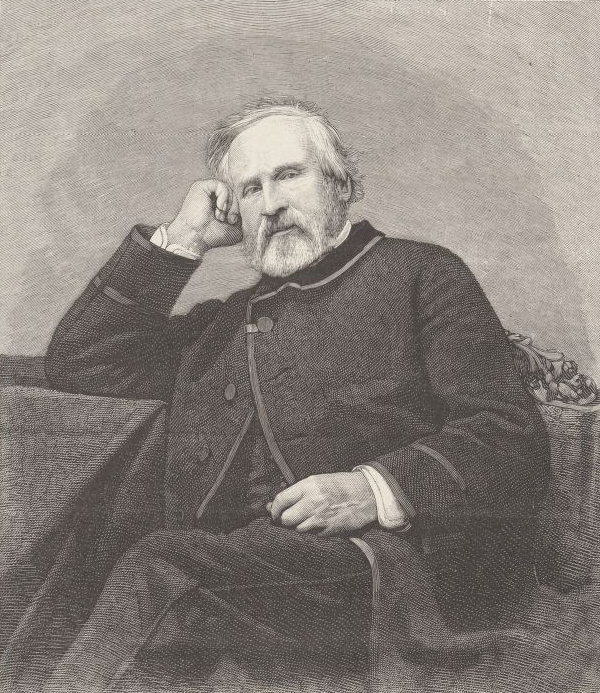
François-Auguste Biard; from Le Monde illustré (1880)

François-Auguste Biard, born François Thérèse Biard (29 June 1799 – 20 June 1882) was a French painter, known for his adventurous travels and the works depicting his experiences.

== Biography ==
He was born in Lyon. Although his parents intended for him to join the clergy, he spent most of his time learning to paint, beginning at a wallpaper factory in Lyon. Eventually, he was able to attend the École des Beaux-Arts, where he worked with Pierre Révoil until 1818, then studied with Fleury François Richard, after he took over as Director. His studies were, however, sporadic and much was learned on his own. He is, therefore, often referred to as "self-taught".

He also travelled to Italy, Greece and the Middle East. His first Salon exhibition at the Salon of 1824 was well received. That same year, the Archdiocese commissioned four paintings from Révoil's former students, including Biard. In 1827, he travelled again, visiting Malta, Cyprus and Egypt. He later obtained the support of the July Monarchy, which acquired several of his works. In 1838, he was decorated with the Legion of Honor.

In 1839, he participated in a scientific expedition, led by Joseph Paul Gaimard, that went to Spitsbergen and Lappland. He was joined by his fiancée, the writer Léonie d’Aunet, who published an account of the trip in 1854, entitled Voyage d’une femme au Spitzberg. His sketches served as inspiration for four large panels at the National Museum of Natural History.

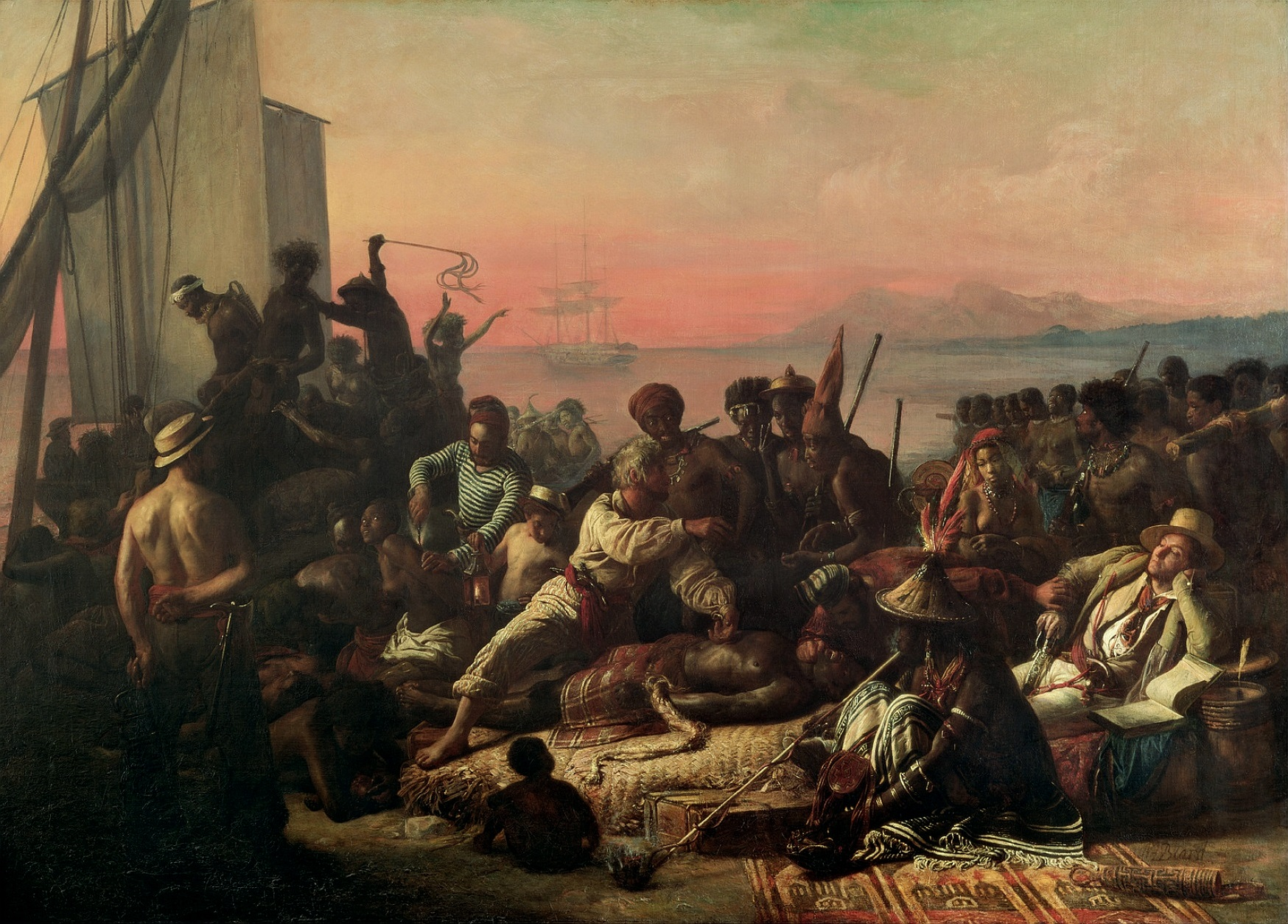
The Slave Trade (1840)

He married Léonie in 1840. Three years later, she became the lover of Victor Hugo. In 1845, she was caught with him, in flagrante delicto, at a hotel. She was arrested for adultery, but Hugo was not tried because the infuriated King Louis Philippe I did not wish the time of the Chamber of Peers to be taken up with a frivolous matter; Biard was bought off by a stunning commission, to make wall paintings for Versailles. Léonie was taken to the Prison Saint-Lazare, served two months and was then placed in a convent for several months more. Hugo was told to leave town. The marriage was nullified in 1855.

Around 1858, he spent two years in Brazil, where he worked at the court of Emperor Pedro II. Using Rio de Janeiro as a base, he made several excursions into the countryside and to the Amazon, where he was one of the first painters to depict the indigenous people. He was offered a teaching position at the Imperial Academy of Fine Arts, but declined in favor of continuing his travels. Before returning to France, he detoured through North America and painted some scenes depicting slavery. In 1862, his account of his travels in Brazil, with 180 engravings, was published by Hachette under the title Deux années au Brésil.

His paintings of anecdotal subjects were popular with Salon audiences, and he was sometimes criticized for inserting humor in otherwise serious paintings.

Biard died on 20 June 1882, in Samois-sur-Seine.

== Selected paintings ==
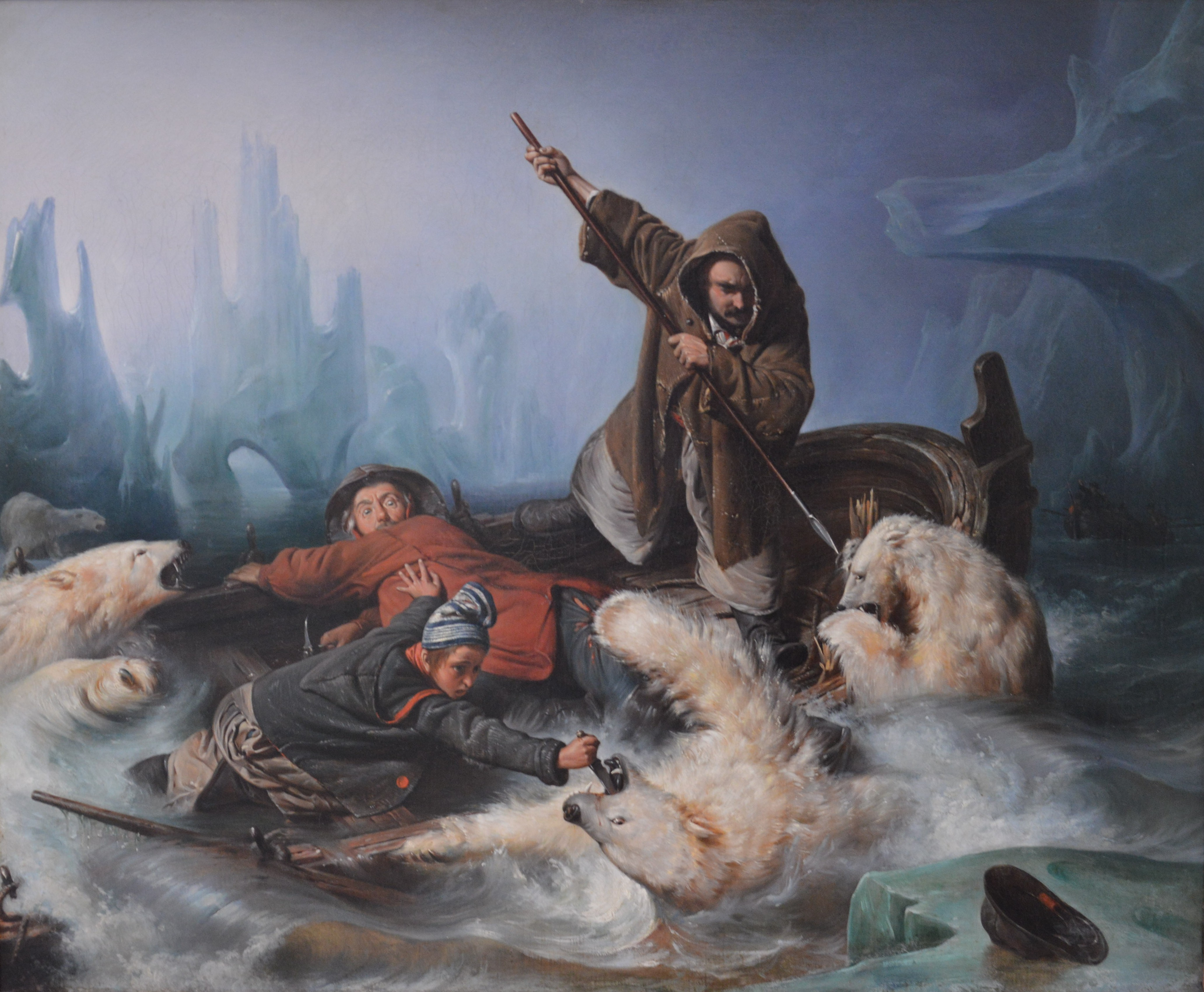
Fighting Polar Bears (1839)

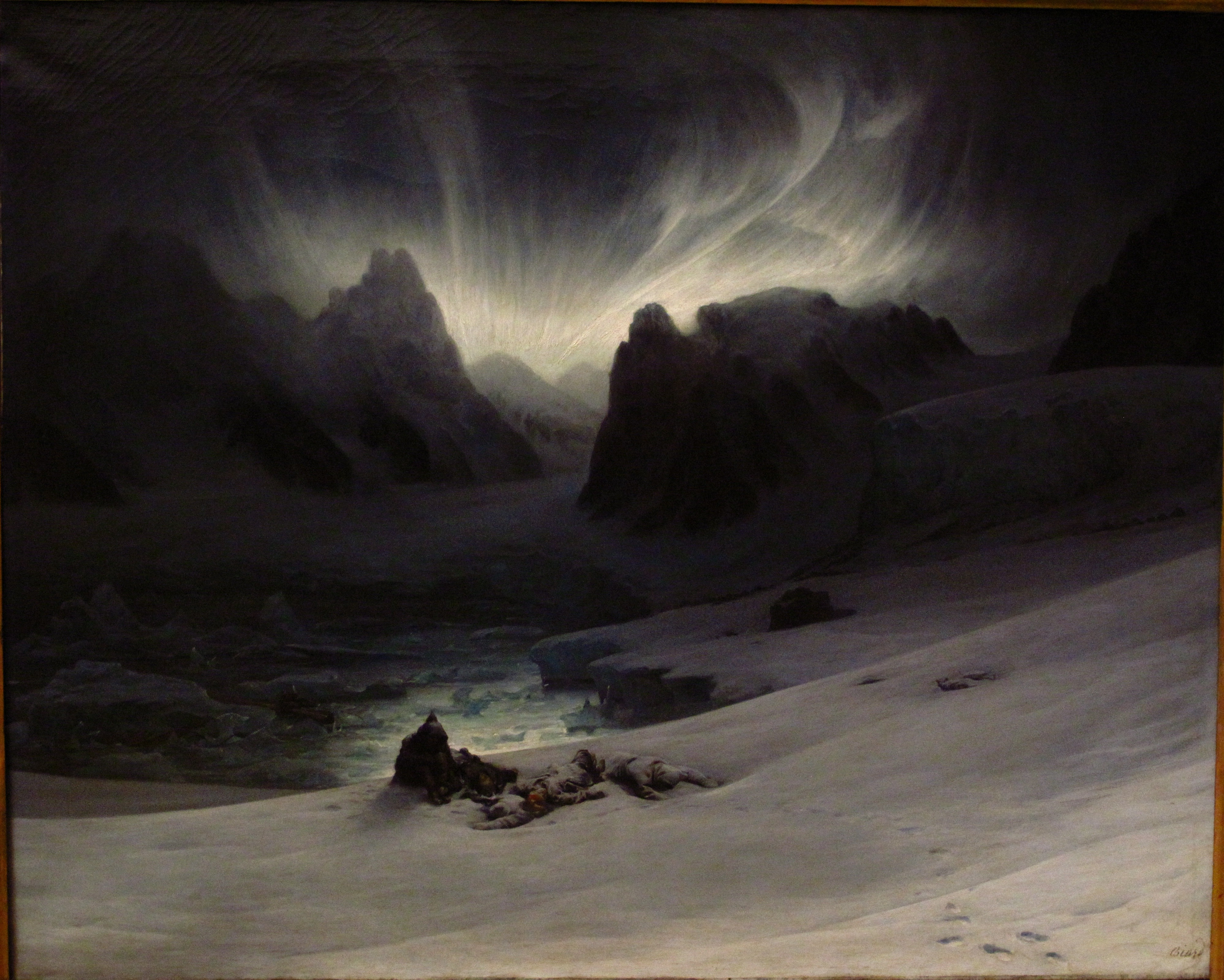
Magdalena Bay (c. 1841)

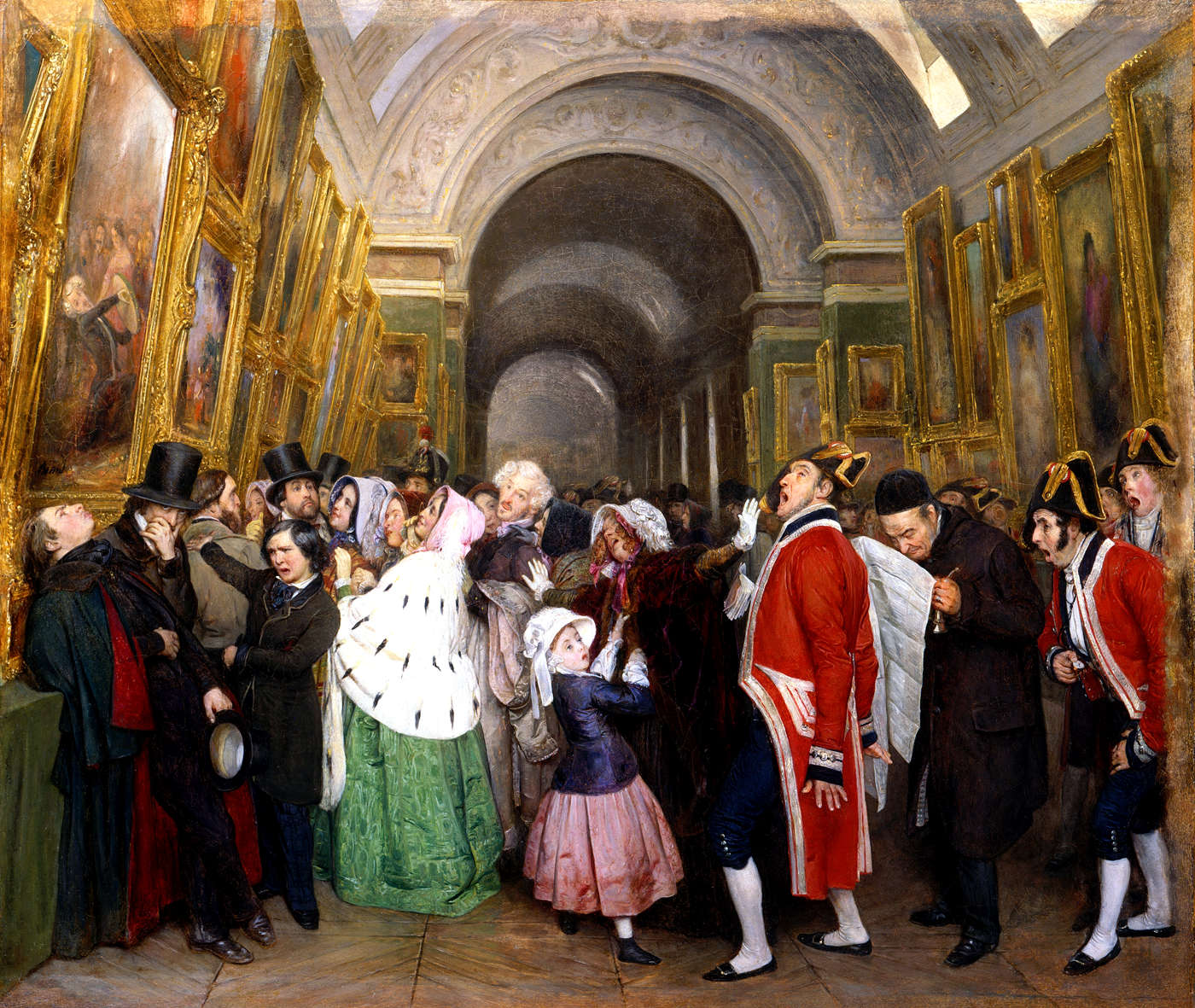
Four O'Clook at the Salon (1847)

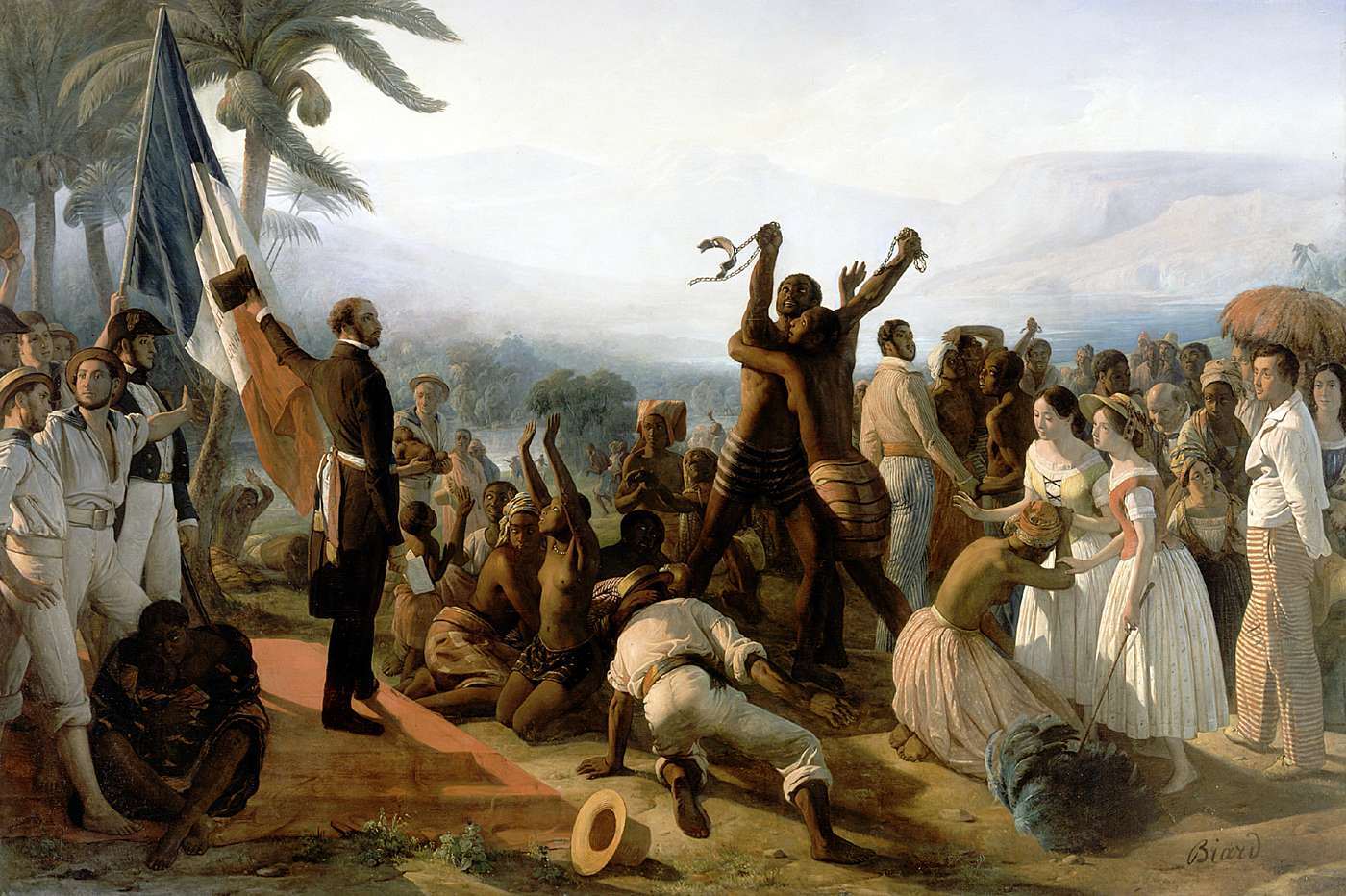
Proclamation of the Abolition of Slavery in the French Colonies, 27 April 1848 (1849)

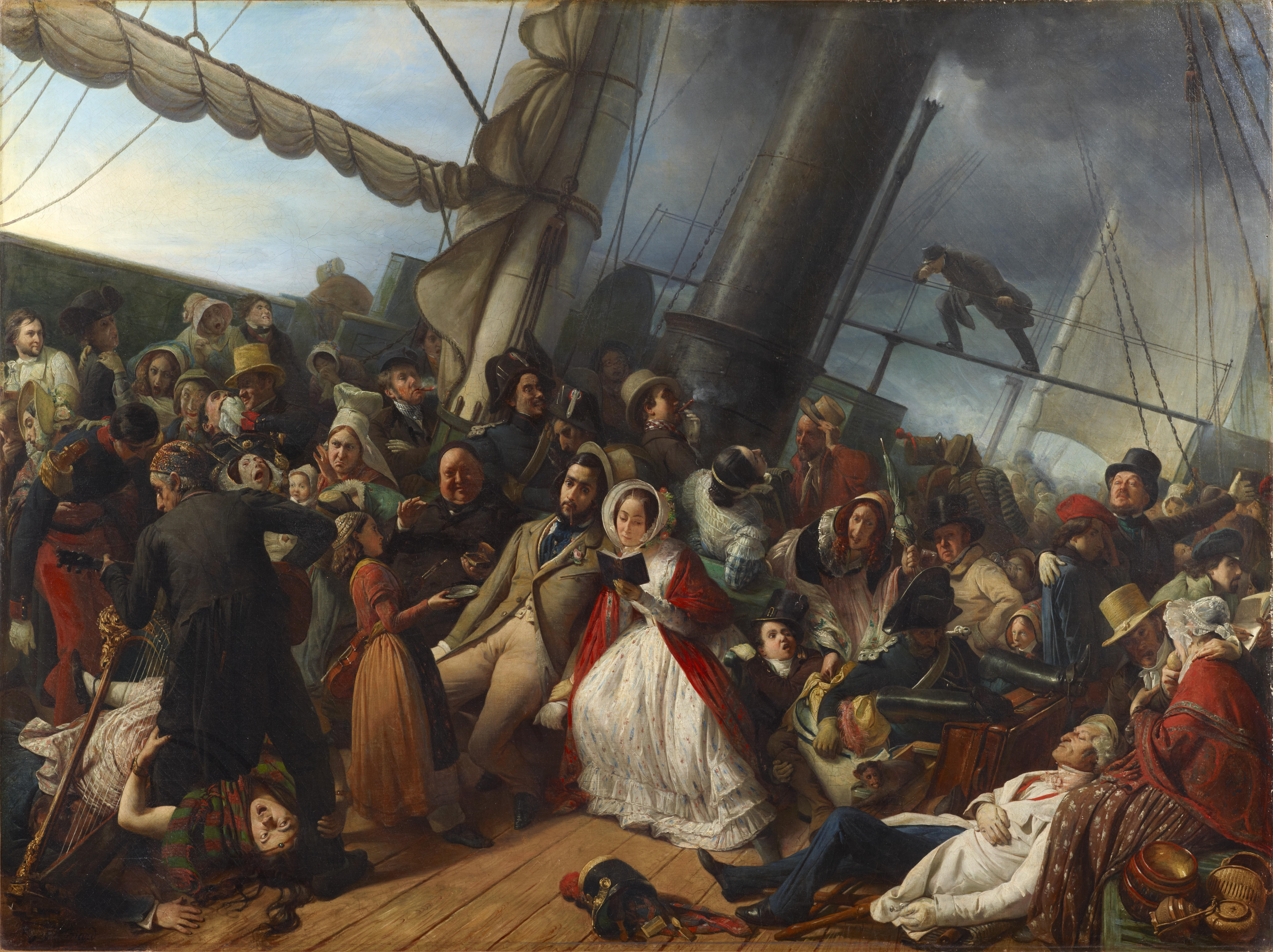
Seasickness at the Ball, on Board an English Corvette (1857)

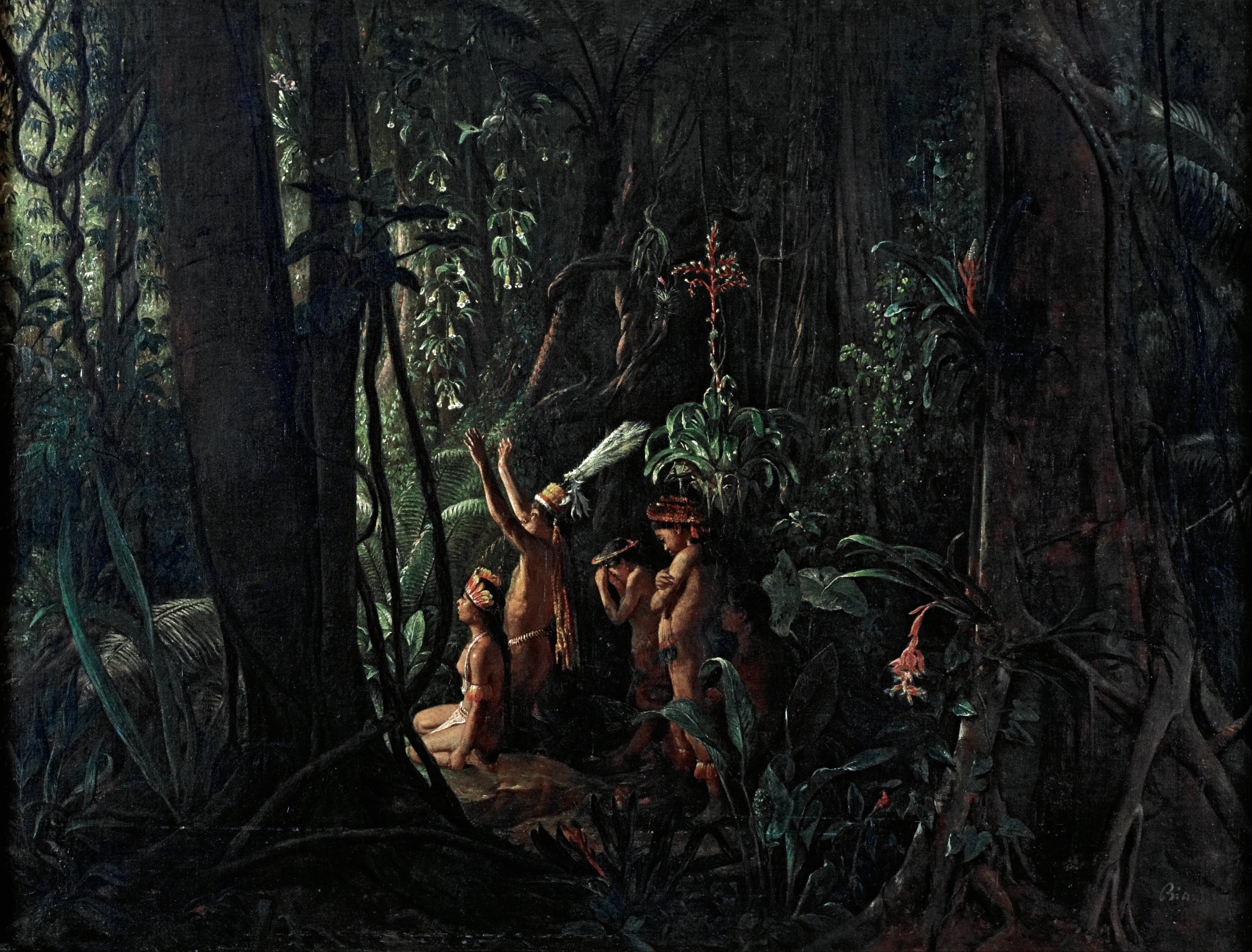
Amazonian Indians
Worshiping the Sun God (c. 1860)

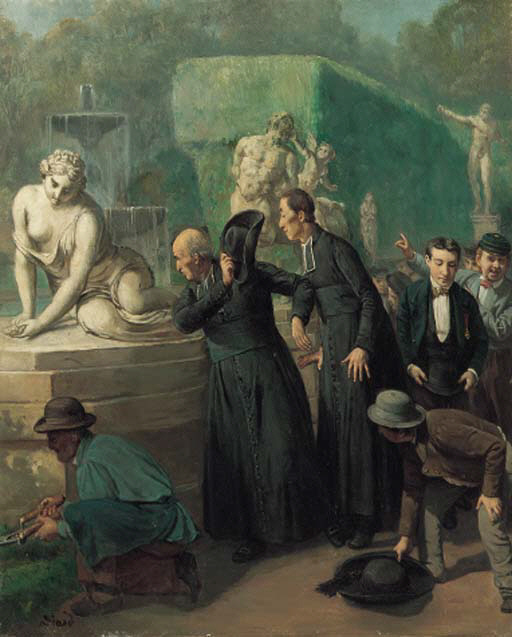
In the Garden

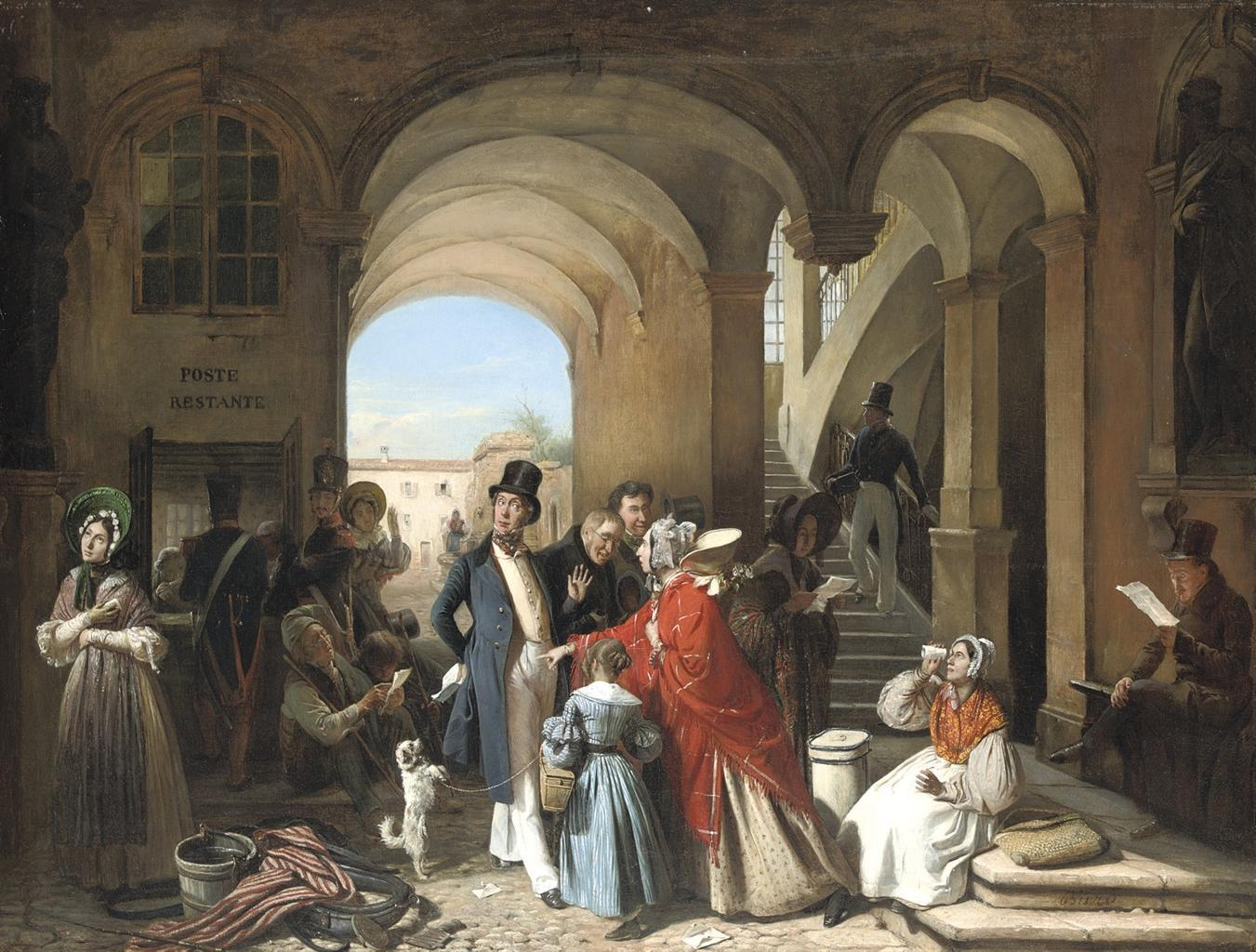
At the Post Office

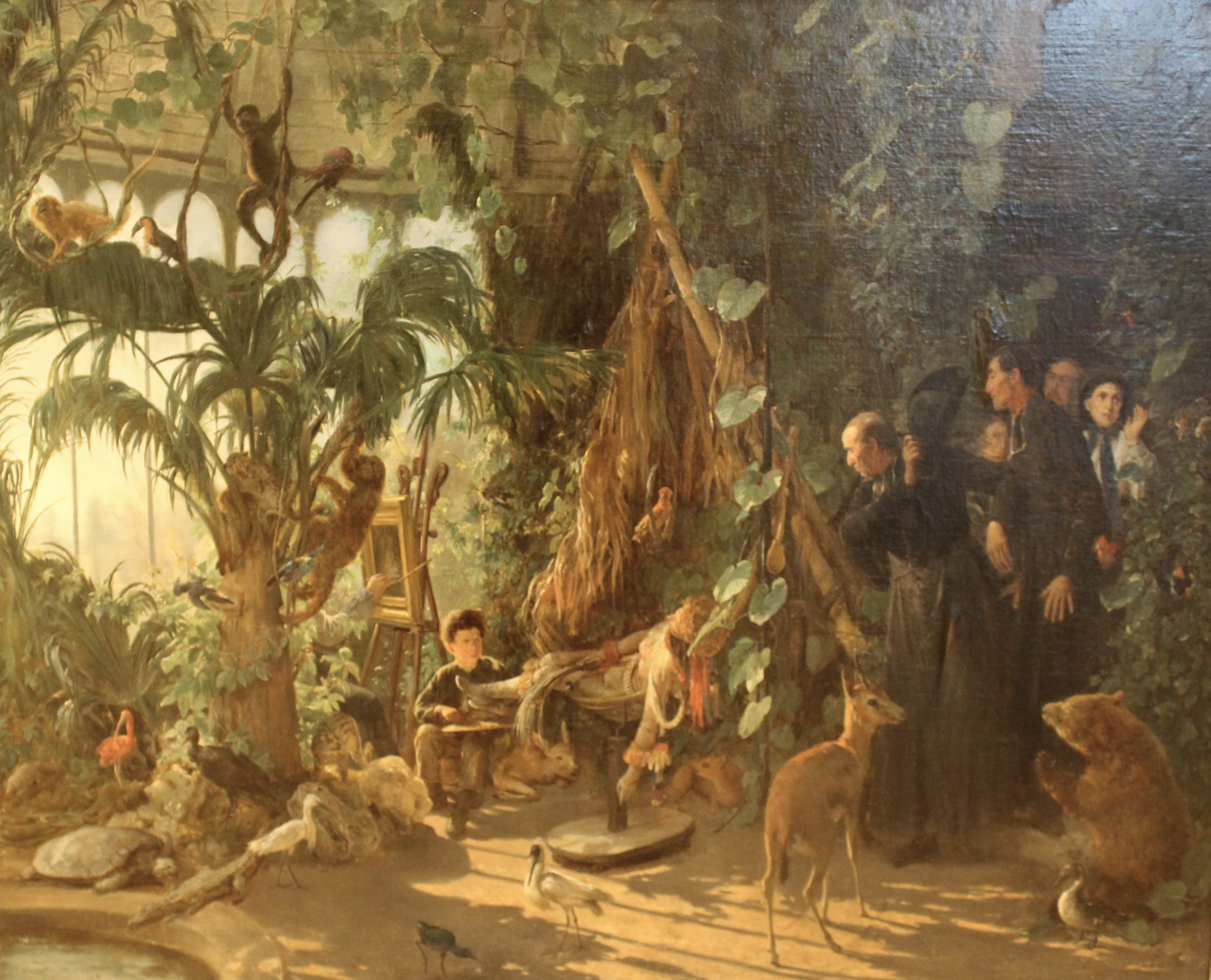
The Artist's Den

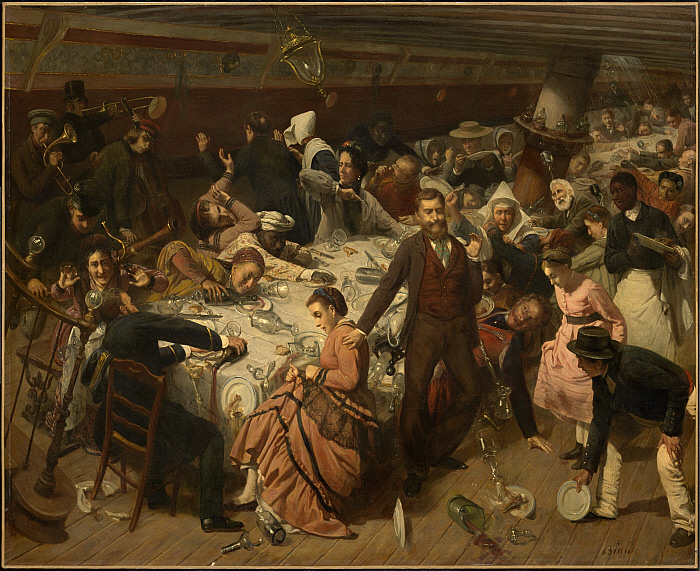
Sudden Squall at Sea (1860s), Oil on canvas, Clark Art Institute
