= Race in France =

Race in France is a subject of deep controversy among French people, as the potential existence of racial categorization in France is presently considered a taboo topic. Often considered against the French universalist tradition, discussions of race are considered by some to be part of a trend of Americanization in France. While discrimination on the basis of race is prohibited by the French constitution, and current law prohibits the collection of racial or ethnic data, there is still discussion as to how race operates in France as well as a wealth of scholarly work concerning race throughout France’s history.

== History ==
The notion of race first entered the French lexicon in the late fifteenth century to categorize breeds of animals for hunting or combat. Shortly afterward, it was applied to members of the French monarchy, then certain members of the French nobility, as a signifier of lineage and to distinguish from new nobles, the vulgar, and the older noble families (the noblesse de race). Rather than the fixed nature of the divisions in the modern conception of race, a newer noble family could shed its lower race status through intergenerational acquisition of social capital.

=== 17th century ===
==== François Bernier's Nouvelle Division ====
The first known French construction of the modern idea of race (as well as the first example of the modern idea of race worldwide) was developed by French thinker François Bernier in his article, originally published anonymously in the Journal des sçavans, entitled “Nouvelle Division de la Terre par les différentes Espéces ou Race d’hommes qui l’habite (A New Division of the Earth according to the Different Species or Races of Men who Inhabit it).” Within it, Bernier divides humankind into four different racial categories:

1. People descended from Europe, except Muscovy, as well as the parts of Africa and Asia excluded hereafter.
2. People from Africa, except for that “between the kingdoms of Fez and Morocco, Algiers, Tunis and Tripoli as far as the Nile.”
3. People from Asia, save for “parts of Borneo, via Arabia, Persia, India, and Siam.”
4. The Sámi people.

While one might expect that his ideas would be popular given the later widespread influence of scientific racism, they did not pick up much traction in France. A product of French salon culture, his writing did not have popular appeal at the time it was published. His discussion of the separation of races by inherent biological factors, with variations between different members of the races, nevertheless served as an indicator of discussions involving scientific racism that would come in later racial discourse.

=== 18th century ===
Influential thinkers on race during the 18th century included Henri de Boulainvilliers and Georges-Louis Leclerc de Buffon.

During this time, the project to create a natural history of humankind was being carried out by other European thinkers such as Carl Linnaeus, who used his taxonomy system to classify different racialized subspecies of humans. However, this taxonomic classification went against the prevailing idea of race in France, that of de Buffon, a monogenist who believed that the differences between human races were reversible, as humans all shared the same common ancestor.

=== 19th century ===
The concept of race in France would become more rigid during the nineteenth century. An anti-slavery movement started to form as early as 1826.

==== Cuvier and anatomy ====
An important proponent of this rigid stance, popularized by the 1820s, was anatomist Georges Cuvier, who used human skeletons and skulls “to characterize races as sets of permanent inherited physical differences which distinguish human groups and to treat them as an essential factor in determining cultural characteristics,” according to historian Emmanuelle Saada. This would represent a move towards looking at civilization as inherent to race, as well as polygenism, where human races were purported to have different evolutionary ancestors.

==== Arthur de Gobineau’s Essay on the Inequality of Human Races ====
French thinker Arthur de Gobineau introduced a different justification of the separation of races. In his Essay on the Inequality of the Human Races, de Gobineau does not rely on the presence of physiological differences between races, but rather invokes a historically-imbued superiority of the “Aryan race,” advocating against racial mixing in order to maintain civilization.

== Antiracism ==
Through the course of French history, multiple scholars and activists have enlisted in developing antiracist thought and praxis.

=== Abolition ===
Abolitionist writings advocating for the end of slavery could be found as early as the 1826 piece by Abbé Grégoire, De la Noblesse de la peau ou Du préjugé des blancs conte la couleur des Africains et celle de leurs descendants noirs et sang-mêlés.
