= Proclamation of the Abolition of Slavery in the French Colonies, 27 April 1848 =

1849 oil painting by François-Auguste Biard

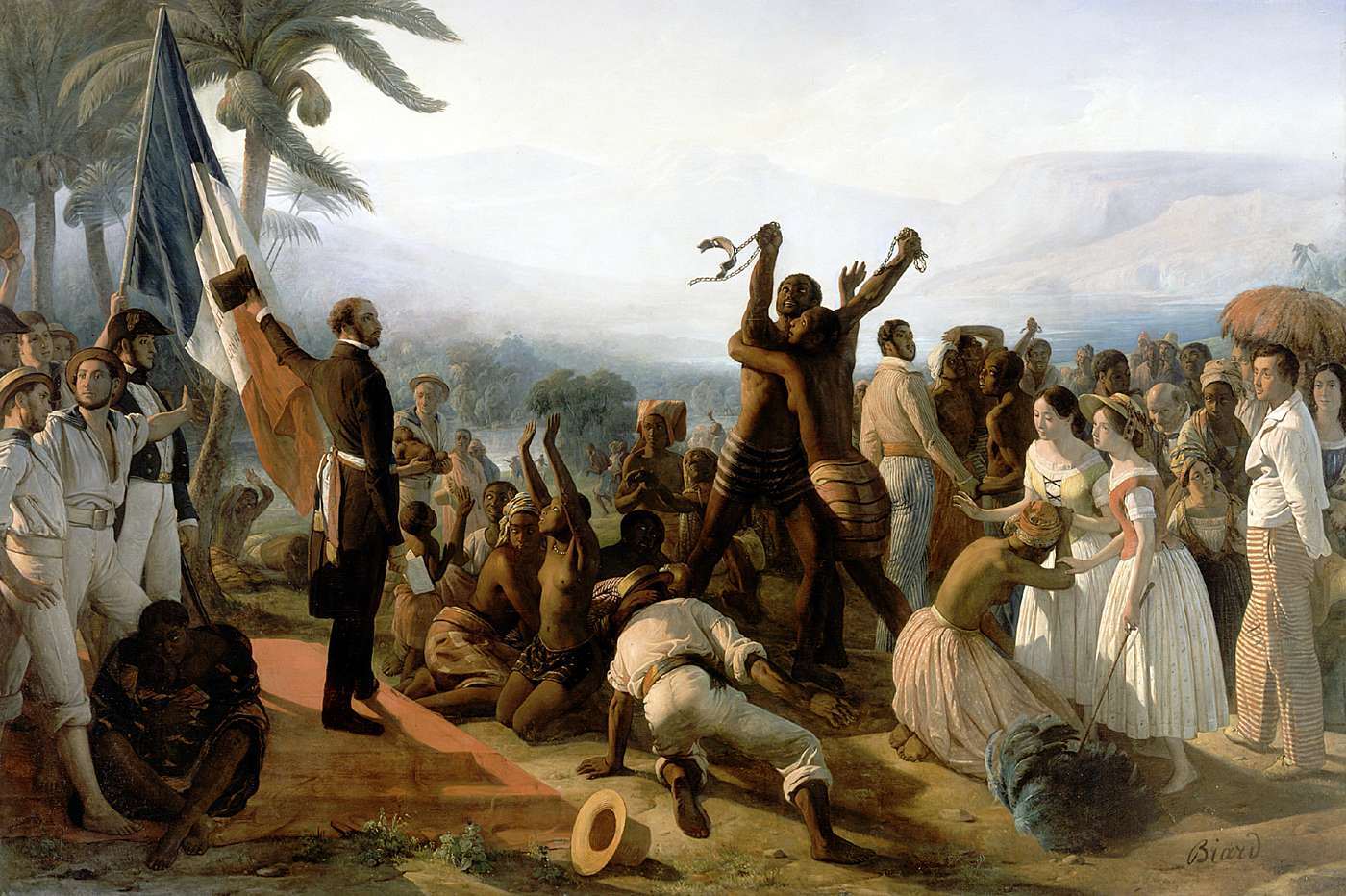
- Artist: François-Auguste Biard
- Year: 1849
- Medium: Oil on canvas
- Dimensions: 260 cm × 392 cm (100 in × 154 in)
- Location: Palace of Versailles; Versailles, France

Proclamation of the Abolition of Slavery in the French Colonies, 27 April 1848 is an 1849 painting by French artist François-Auguste Biard which is kept in the Palace of Versailles, France. It was exhibited at the Salon of 1849 at the Tuileries Palace in Paris.

== See also ==
- Decree of the Abolition of Slavery of April 27, 1848, on whose events this painting is based
- Abolitionism in France
- Victor Schœlcher
- French Second Republic
