= Bilichild (wife of Theudebert II) =

Queen of Austrasia

Bilichild (died 610) was a queen of Austrasia by marriage to Theudebert II.

She was bought from the slave market by Brunhilda of Austrasia. In 1979, Alfred Friese hypothesised that she was related to Duke Gisulf I of Friuli, whose two daughters were captured and enslaved, only for one to be married to a Bavarian prince and the other to an Alaman prince. This hypothesis was then disproven by Christian Settipani.

In 608, Bilichild married King Theudebert II of Austrasia and gave birth to a daughter, betrothed to Adaloald, son of Agilulf, king of the Lombards. She may also have been the mother of Merovech (d. 612), but Karl August Eckhardt doubts this, esteeming that it is more likely that he was the son of Theodechilde.

Even if she was of "low origin" (which could otherwise be a concern for a queen), she was loved by her subjects.

She was reportedly murdered by her spouse when he wished to marry Theodechilde (d. 613).

== See also ==
- List of French consorts
