= Bertradaburg =

- Burg Mürlenbach
- Mürlenbach
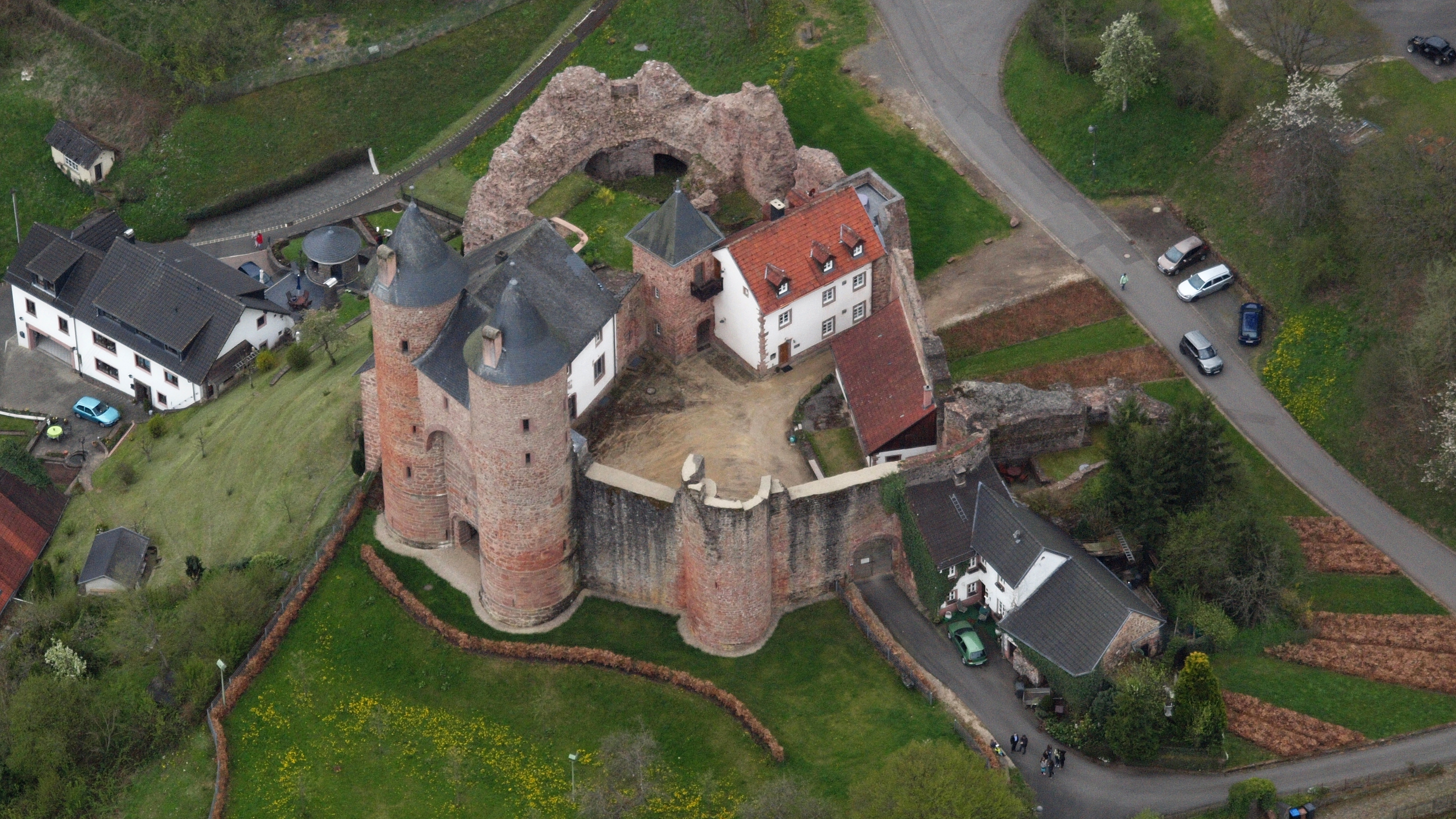
- The Bertradaburg, 2015 aerial photograph

Site information
- Type: hill castle, spur castle
- Code: DE-RP
- Condition: Tower house (double tower gate)

Location
- Coordinates: 50°08′57.81″N 6°35′55.24″E
- Height: 348 m above sea level (NN)

Site history
- Built: Early Middle Ages; first recorded in the 13th century

The Bertradaburg is a ruined hill castle on a rock spur, 348 m above sea level (NN), above the village of Mürlenbach in the county of Vulkaneifel in the German state of Rhineland-Palatinate. It thus stands in the geographical centre of Merovingian Francia.

== History ==
The castle was built on the remains of a Roman castrum, which probably guarded the Roman road from Trier to Cologne. In the castle, according to local tradition, Bertrada, the mother of Charlemagne is said to have lived which implies that his birth was around 747 AD. The existence of the castle is first recorded in the 13th century when it is mentioned as a state fortress of the princely imperial abbey of Prüm (cf. the Middle Rhine Register or Mittelrheinisches Urkundenbuch), archaeological finds have indicated that there were earlier fortifications on the site.

After Prüm Abbey was occupied and damaged by French Revolutionary troops from 1794 to 1802, Mürlenbach's castle was seized as part of the forced secularisation of the abbey estate and auctioned by France to a private owner.

In the late 20th century, the surviving castle walls and buildings were restored by the Tiepelmann family and the state-owned, 30-metre-high, ruined double tower gate was rebuilt with state finance. In 2009, the nine owners were given a grant from the federal and state budgets to secure and maintain the 16th-century, five-metre-thick, southwest roundel. The 13th-century shield wall was also renovated with funding from the state of Rhineland-Palatinate.

== Description and present use ==
The 30-metre-high tower house, the double tower gateway of the Betradaburg, is visible from a long way off. It has good views of the surrounding countryside and may be visited as part of a guided tour. Every year the Mürlenbach Castle Festival (Mürlenbacher Burgfest) takes place. The castle is privately owned and has holiday apartments which are currently being renovated.
