= Bertrada of Prüm =

Merovingian noblewoman

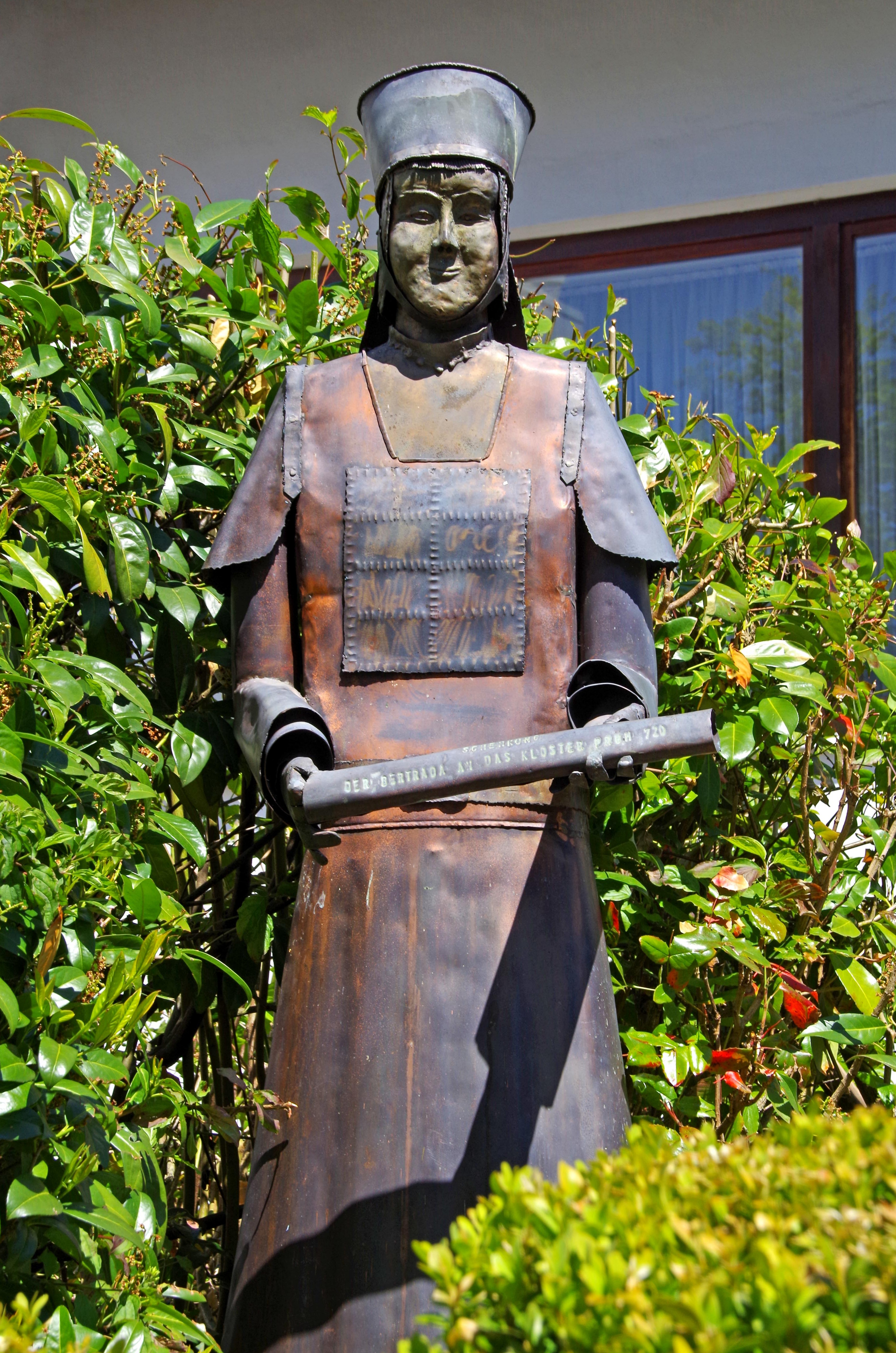
Bertrada's seat in Prüm, Germany

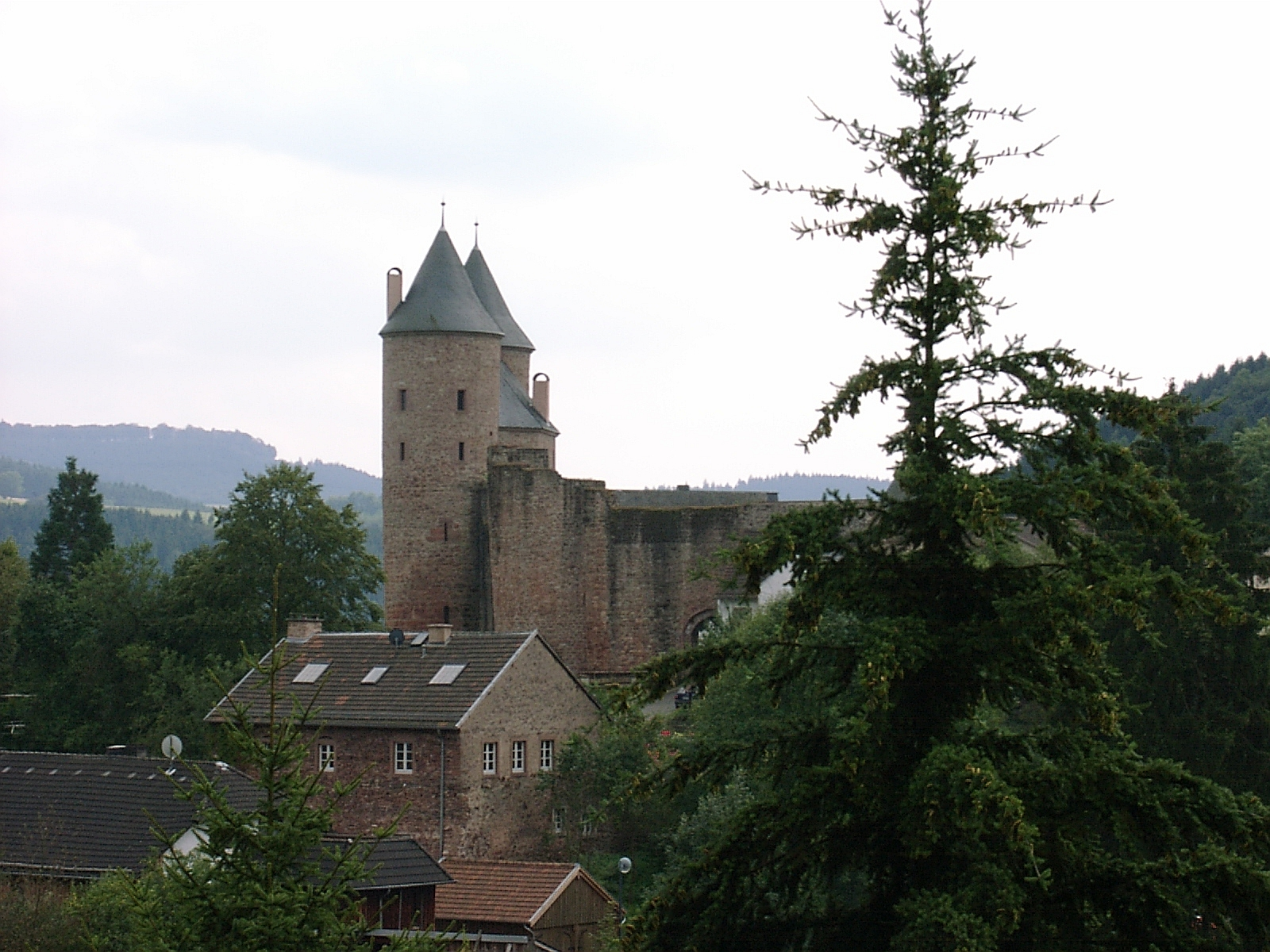
Bertrada castle in Mürlenbach, named after Bertrada of Prüm

Bertrada (born c. 670; died after 720), also called Berthe or Bertree, is known to be the mother of Charibert of Laon, with whom she is co-founder and benefactor of the Prüm Abbey. They founded the abbey in 721.

== History ==
Bertrada came from a wealthy Austrasian noble family. Several alternative solutions to the question of her parentage have been suggested, among them:

- She was daughter of the seneschal and Pfalzgraf Hugobert and Irmina of Oeren see Deautsche Biographie and reference point casting doubt over this assumption page 527.
- She was the daughter-in-law of Irmina (died c. 704), daughter of Hugobert and Irmina, and her husband Charveus, Count of Laon, brother of Lambert, Count of Hesbaye
- She was daughter of Theuderic III, king of Neustria and Austrasia, and Clotilda of Herstal.

The last two possibilities are not mutually exclusive.

Bertrada the Elder was married, but the identity of her husband is unknown.

Bertrada and her husband had one known child

- Charibert of Laon

Through Charibert's daughter Bertrada of Laon, wife of Pippin the Short, Bertrada of Prüm is the great-grandmother of Charlemagne.

== Sources ==
- Maurice Chaume, "Études carolingiennes I: La famille de saint Guillaume de Gellone", in _Annales de Bourgogne_, vol. I (1929), 27-56 who presents the hypothesis that she was daughter of Theuderic (Thierry).
- Settipani, Christian. "The Ancestors of Charlemagne: Addendum to Addena, 31 January 2000" (PDF).
- Deutsche Biographie - https://www.deutsche-biographie.de/pnd138605904.html?language=en
- Cert Thesaurus - https://data.cerl.org/thesaurus/cnp01459050
- Germania Sacra Online - https://personendatenbank.germania-sacra.de/index/gsn/062-00086-001
- Normdateneintrag des Südwestdeutschen Bibliotheksverbundes (SWB) - https://swb.bsz-bw.de/DB=2.114/CMD?ACT=SRCHA&IKT=2011&TRM=gnd:138605904&REC=2
