= Mürlenbach =

- Municipality
- Coat of arms

- Location of Mürlenbach within Vulkaneifel district
- Interactive map of Mürlenbach
- Location within Germany Location within Rhineland-Palatinate
- Coordinates: 50°9′5″N 6°36′6″E
- Country: Germany
- State: Rhineland-Palatinate
- District: Vulkaneifel
- Municipal assoc.: Gerolstein

Government
  - Mayor (2019–24): Ewald Weidig (CDU)

Area
  - Total: 21.64 km^{2} (8.36 sq mi)
- Elevation: 323 m (1,060 ft)

Population (2025-12-31)
  - Total: 485
  - Density: 22.4/km^{2} (58.0/sq mi)
- Time zone: UTC+01:00 (CET)
  - Summer (DST): UTC+02:00 (CEST)
- Postal codes: 54570
- Dialling codes: 06594
- Vehicle registration: DAU
- Website: www.muerlenbach.de

Mürlenbach is an Ortsgemeinde – a municipality belonging to a Verbandsgemeinde, a kind of collective municipality – in the Vulkaneifel district in Rhineland-Palatinate, Germany. It belongs to the Verbandsgemeinde of Gerolstein, whose seat is in the like-named town.

== Geography ==
The municipality lies in the Vulkaneifel, a part of the Eifel known for its volcanic history, geographical and geological features, and even ongoing activity today, including gases that sometimes well up from the earth.

Mürlenbach lies between the larger towns of Gerolstein and Bitburg on the river Kyll, which flows into the Moselle.

== History ==
The castle, the Bertradaburg, is said to be one of Charlemagne’s possible birthplaces, although this cannot be confirmed. The castle's existence is only witnessed as far back as the 13th century; however, archaeological features suggest that there were forerunner buildings to the impressive, but undated, castle complex that still stands nowadays.

In and around Mürlenbach, a series of Roman and mediaeval remnants has been found (lesser temple complexes, hoards of coins); these are catalogued in the Trier Rhenish State Museum’s archive. A clue to the village’s importance in late antiquity and the Early Middle Ages is its favourable location near the old Roman road from Trier to Cologne at the junction of a sideroad leading eastwards. These roads were in all likelihood still used at least until the High Middle Ages.

Whether Mürlenbach belonged to Prüm Abbey as long ago as the Early Middle Ages, which would have put it close to Carolingian royalty, is something that simply cannot be confirmed. Nonetheless, the village, and the castle, too, did indeed belong to Prüm Abbey in the High Middle Ages, when the castle enjoyed importance both as a border fortification and a safe haven for the Abbey in times of retreat.

When the Abbey was annexed to the Prince-Bishopric of Trier, the castle lost a great deal of its importance beginning in the 16th century, although at first it was further expanded and furnished with artillery bastions. After the Bishopric was secularized in the Napoleonic Wars, the castle, which by this time had already partly fallen into disrepair, was sold off to be used as a quarry.

On 21 April 1824, a fire wrought heavy damage. Twenty-four houses, 25 barns and stables and the church were either destroyed or damaged.

As late as the 20th century, both the parish and the municipality stood as a regional centre.

=== Religion ===
Most of Mürlenbach’s inhabitants are Christian, the overwhelming majority of whom are Roman Catholic. The village has a Catholic church, St. Luzia Kirche (“Saint Lucy’s Church”).

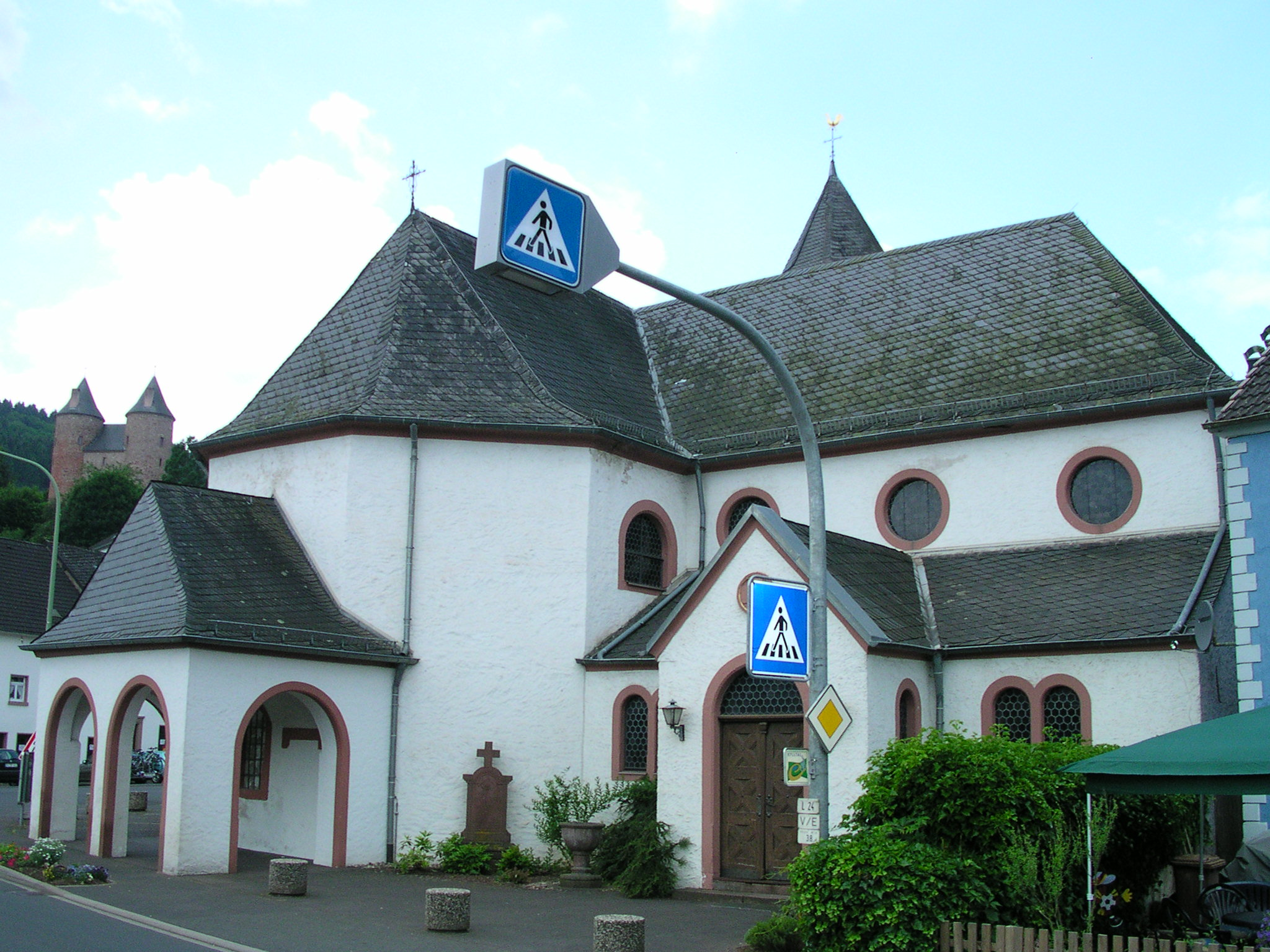
St. Luzia Kirche

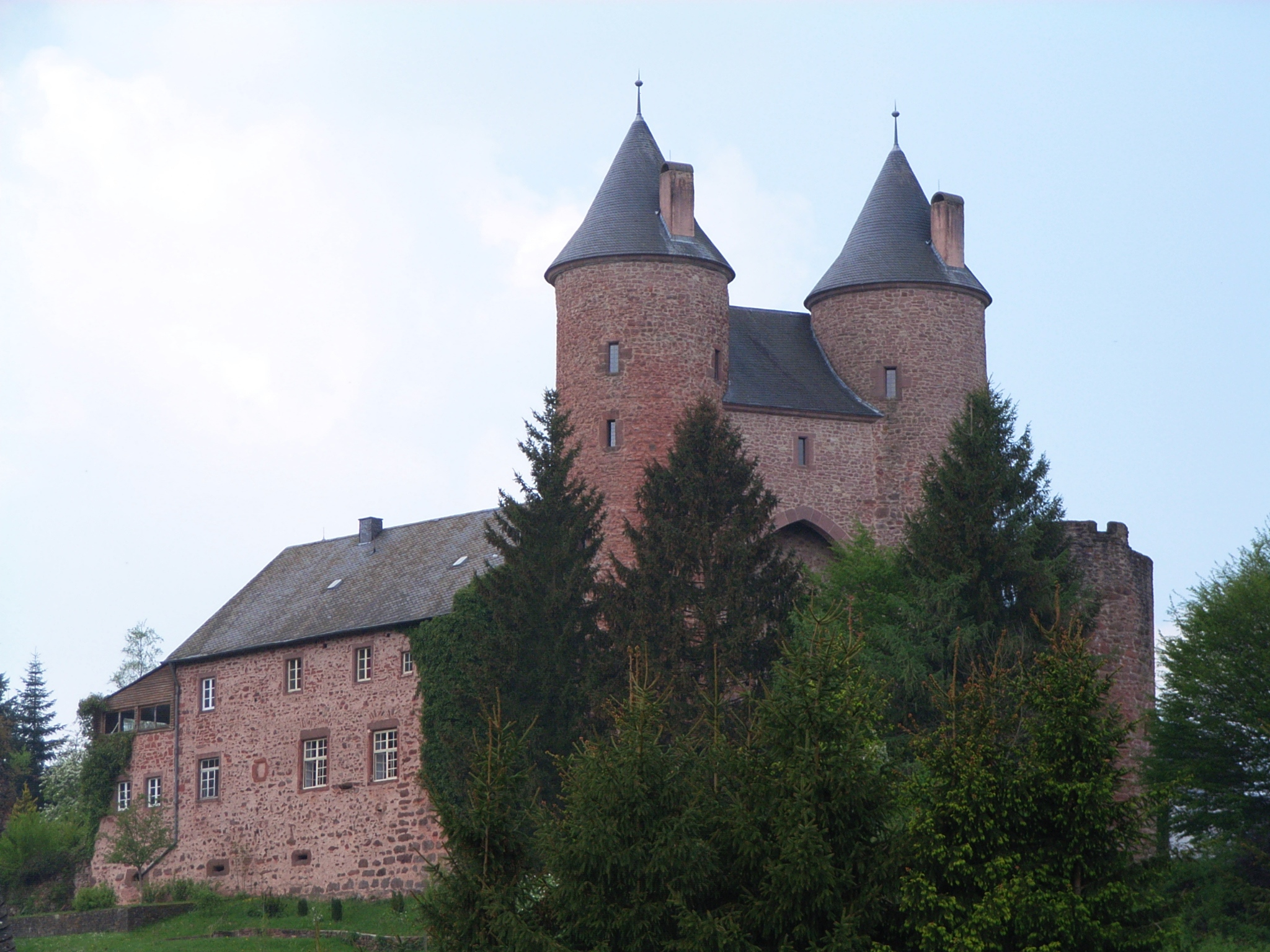
Bertradaburg

Besides Christians, there were once also Jews living in Mürlenbach from the mid 19th century until the late 1930s. They numbered 12 in 1885, 8 in 1895, 9 in 1905 and 4 in 1930.

== Politics ==
=== Municipal council ===
The council is made up of 12 council members, who were elected by proportional representation at the municipal election held on 7 June 2009, and the honorary mayor as chairman.

The municipal election held on 7 June 2009 yielded the following results:

Year	CDU	FWG	Total
2009	8	4	12 seats
2004	9	3	12 seats

=== Mayor ===
Mürlenbach's mayor is Ewald Weidig.

=== Coat of arms ===
The German blazon reads: In Grün eine erhöhte, eingebogene, silberne Spitze, darin ein rotes Torhaus mit zwei Türmen, einen blauen Wellenschildfuß teilweise überdeckend. Vorne ein silbernes Lamm mit Fahne, darin ein rotes Kreuz, hinten ein links gewendeter silberner Dolch.

The municipality's arms might in English heraldic language be described thus: Tierced in mantle above fess point, dexter vert a lamb carrying a banner argent, the banner charged with a cross gules, sinister vert a dagger bendwise of the second, in base argent a base wavy azure surmounted by a gatehouse with two towers gules.

The green field tincture in the upper divisions symbolizes the almost 80% share of the municipal area that is wooded and the charming, rustic location in the Kyll valley. The Bertradaburg, the local castle – in the local lore held to be Charlemagne’s birthplace – stands as the main charge in the arms, reflecting its position as the municipality’s landmark, one that for centuries has been an historically inseparable part of the village.

In the 1997 Festschrift (a celebratory publication), it says: “The castle and the village form together with the Kyll flowing through the valley a oneness.” Thus, the wavy base was included in the arms to symbolize the Kyll, the Godesbach and the Braunebach, and also to refer to the castle's history as a moated castle.

The silver lamb refers to the village's and the castle's special relationship with Prüm Abbey. The Abbots of Prüm were, through Bertrada's endowment of the monastery, the lords at Mürlenbach and often lived at the castle, until the Electorate of Trier took over ownership. Prüm Abbey bore the Easter Lamb in its arms.

The village's and the church's patron saint is Saint Lucy. She was martyred for her beliefs by being stabbed with a dagger, explaining the charge in sinister chief.

== Culture and sightseeing ==
=== Buildings ===
- Bertradaburg (castle) and castle wall (monumental zone), mediaeval hilltop castle with living quarters, gatehouse and horseshoe-shaped bastions; first mentioned in the 14th century, today a ruin; gatehouse still preserved with two flanking round towers, under the modern house is the cellar of a former hall, remnants of two bastions, about 1589.
- Saint Lucy's Catholic Parish Church (Pfarrkirche St. Lucia), Birresborner Straße, Baroque aisleless church integrated into a newer Baroque Revival, three-naved building, 1923–1924; shaft cross from 1756.
- Alte Straße 11 – estate complex, plastered building possibly from early 19th century, commercial buildings, some built onto the main building, others freestanding, old cobbles in the yard.
- Bahnhof - Site of the main train station and now defunct world-famous restaurant; Kathe Gobel's
- Burgring 8 – so-called Old Castle House (Altes Burghaus) on high basement, quarrystone, partly plastered.
- Hardter Weg 2 – three-floor house with narrow porch, from 1768, well pump from 1765.
- Im Mühlenpesch 3 – Baroque entrance with fanlight from 1746.
- Meisburger Straße 4 – former rectory (?), representative Baroque house, apparently from 1762, side building, whole complex.
- Schönecker Straße 1 – Baroque building with windows with segmental arches, outwardly altered with additions, inside some features of the architectural period preserved.
- Schönecker Straße 7 – estate along street (former mill?), timber-frame building, partly solid, mid 19th century (?).
- Schönecker Straße/corner of Am Remelsbach – wayside cross, shaft cross from 1671, surmounting cross late 19th or early 20th century.
- Grindelborn, southeast of the village on the road to Salm – estate complex, country house style, about 1910 or 1920.
- Weißenseifen 8 – Quereinhaus (a combination residential and commercial house divided for these two purposes down the middle, perpendicularly to the street) from 1835, old cobbles in the yard.
- Wayside cross, west of the village in the woods on the way to Weißenseifen, wooden beam cross from 1882.
- Wayside cross, southeast of the village in the woods, sandstone beam cross from 1666
- Wayside cross, southeast of the village on the road to Salm, red sandstone shaft cross from 1671.
- Wayside cross, northeast of the village on the way to Hardt, shaft cross from 1768.
- Wayside cross, west of the village on the way to Weißenseifen, on the Prümer Berg (mountain), pedestal cross from 1843.

=== Sport and leisure ===
Recreation includes flyfishing and kayaking on the Kyll and cycling on a bicycle path along the Kyll. Mürlenbach is a popular tourist destination known for its quaint mediaeval village atmosphere including a mediaeval castle (the Bertradaburg) nestled in the Kyll valley.

== Economy and infrastructure ==
=== Transport ===
The stop Mürlenbach lies on the Eifelstrecke (railway) running the route Cologne–Euskirchen–Gerolstein–Trier. The Eifelbahn rail service between Gerolstein and Trier calls here.

Public transport is integrated into the Verkehrsverbund Region Trier (VRT), whose fares therefore apply.

=== Established businesses ===
In Mürlenbach the firm Feluwa Pumpen GmbH has been developing and producing process pumps and sewage pumping stations since 1960. Among others, the whole pumping facility for the former Berlin Lehrter Stadtbahnhof (railway station) and the environmental pumping technology at the Spangdahlem Air Base both came from Feluwa.
