= Ansbald of Prüm =

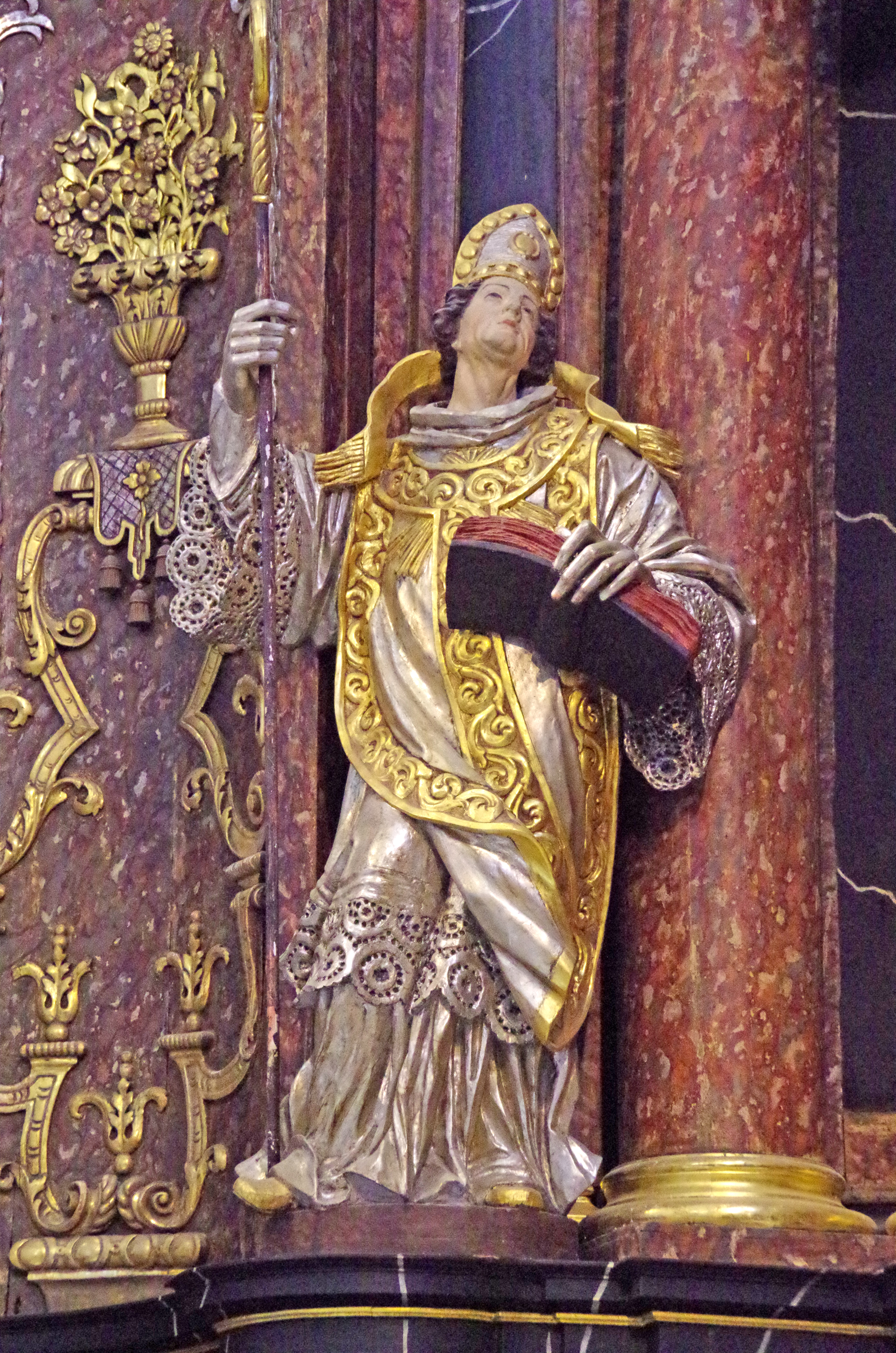
Statue of Ansbald in the Basilica of the Transfiguration of Our Lord, Prüm

Ansbald or Ansbold (died 12 July 886) was the abbot of Prüm from 860 until his death.

Ansbald was a friend and correspondent of Lupus of Ferrières. In a letter addressed to Abbot Markward of Prüm between 840 and 844, Lupus sends greetings to Ansbald, then just a monk at Prüm. With Lupus, he worked on collating the writings of Cicero. In a letter from September 847, Lupus thanks Ansbald for sending him copies of some of Cicero's letters and asks for a copy of Cicero's In Arato.

Ansbald was elected to succeed Eigil as abbot in 860. Lupus addressed two letters to him on 28/29 February 862 and 7 March 862. In 861, King Lothair II granted him the right to a market and mint exempt from taxation at Romarivilla. After 870, he was an important supporter of King Louis the German in Lotharingia. On 12 April 870, Louis restored to Prüm lands near Bingen that had been seized by the rebellious count Werner. In February 871, confirmed further lands to the abbey.

In 882, Prüm was sacked by Vikings. Ansbald rebuilt it with aid from Emperor Charles the Fat. He died on 12 July 886 and was venerated as a saint.

== Bibliography ==
- Goldberg, Eric J. (2006). Struggle for Empire: Kingship and Conflict under Louis the German, 817–876. Cornell University Press.
- Regenos, Graydon W., ed. (1966). The Letters of Lupus of Ferrières. Martinus Nijhoff.
- Tellenbach, Gerd (1962). "Der Konvent der Reichsabtei Prüm unter Abt Ansbald (860–886)" (PDF). In Werner Fleischhauer; Walter Grube; Paul Zinsmaier (eds.). Neue Beiträge zur südwestdeutschen Landesgeschichte: Festschrift für Max Miller, dargebracht v. Freunden und Kollegen. Stuttgart. pp. 1–10.
- Thatcher, Oliver, ed. (1905). A Source Book for Mediaeval History. Charles Scribner's Sons.
- Walsh, Michael J. (2007). A New Dictionary of Saints: East and West. Liturgical Press.
