= Birresborn =

- Municipality
- Coat of arms

- Location of Birresborn within Vulkaneifel district
- Interactive map of Birresborn
- Location within Germany Location within Rhineland-Palatinate
- Coordinates: 50°10′35″N 6°37′33″E
- Country: Germany
- State: Rhineland-Palatinate
- District: Vulkaneifel
- Municipal assoc.: Gerolstein

Government
  - Mayor (2019–24): Christiane Stahl

Area
  - Total: 20.88 km^{2} (8.06 sq mi)
- Elevation: 340 m (1,120 ft)

Population (2025-12-31)
  - Total: 1,064
  - Density: 50.96/km^{2} (132.0/sq mi)
- Time zone: UTC+01:00 (CET)
  - Summer (DST): UTC+02:00 (CEST)
- Postal codes: 54574
- Dialling codes: 06594
- Vehicle registration: DAU
- Website: birresborn.de

Birresborn is an Ortsgemeinde – a municipality belonging to a Verbandsgemeinde, a township in the Vulkaneifel district in Rhineland-Palatinate, Germany. It belongs to the Verbandsgemeinde of Gerolstein, whose seat is in the like-named town.

== Geography ==
=== Location ===
The municipality lies roughly 6 km south of Gerolstein at an elevation of 350 m above sea level in the Kyll valley in the Vulkaneifel, a part of the Eifel known for its volcanic history, geographical and geological features, and even ongoing activity today, including gases that sometimes well up from the earth.

=== Constituent communities ===
Birresborn's Ortsteile are Sauerwasser, the hunting lodge Waldfries and the outlying centre of Rom.

=== Neighbouring municipalities ===
Clockwise from the north, these are Gerolstein (7 km away), Michelbach (outlying centre of Gerolstein; 4 km away), Salm (8 km away), Mürlenbach (4 km away), Kopp (4 km away) and Büdesheim (9 km away).

=== Mountains ===
Loftier peaks in the municipality include the Rödelkaul (592 m), the Daxberg (548 m), the Goldberg (523 m) and the Vulkan Kalem (509.4 m).

=== Streams ===
- Kyll
- Fischbach
- Schlemmbach

=== Mineral springs ===
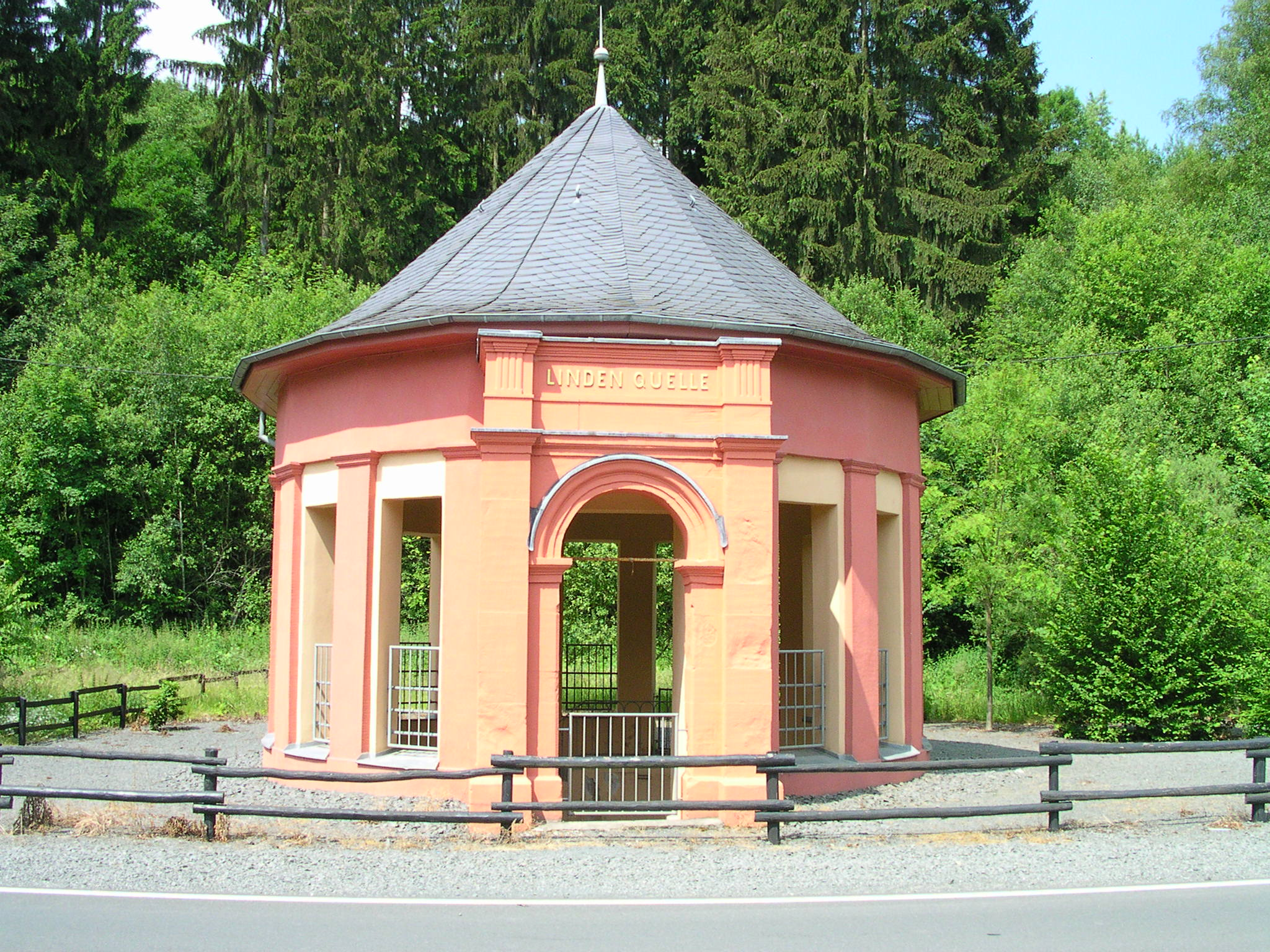
Lindenquelle

==== Adonis Quelle ====
The Adonis Quelle – Quelle is German for "spring" – lies in the middle of the village, but has been closed since November 2003 owing to contamination. The Quelltempel ("Spring Temple") also found here near the bridge on the Kyll, in which one could once drink water from the Adonis Quelle and draw it for one's own use, has likewise been closed ever since.

==== Lindenquelle ====
The Lindenquelle lies roughly 4 km north of Birresborn on the way to Gerolstein. The Quelltempel still standing here is under monumental protection, and since 3 July 2009, has been being restored. Moreover, the mineral water is once more gushing forth. The contamination that ended the Adonis Quelle's usefulness has not affected the Lindenquelle. Here, one can drink water free of charge and also fill up on it the year round.

=== Conservation areas ===
Nature conservation areas exist at the Vulkan Kalem, at the ice caves and in the Fischbach valley, in the Felst and in the Hundsbach valley.

== History ==
In 721, Birresborn had its first documentary mention under the name Birgisburias. The prefix Bir— is a word of Semitic origin. It means "well" or "watering place". Commonly, however, Birgis-burias is translated as "Good Well".

On 15 June 1871, Birresborn was linked to the German railway network with the opening of the Eifelbahn between Gerolstein and Trier. On 14 May 1908, the Lindenquelle was acknowledged as a public utility. On 20 February 1914, the municipality's springs were recognized by the state as health springs. On Christmas Day 1944, not long before the Second World War ended, a great part of Birresborn was destroyed in an Allied air raid. Since 1971, Birresborn has been part of the Verbandsgemeinde of Gerolstein, in the Daun district, which is now known as the Vulkaneifel district. On 11 November 2003, the mineral spring Birresborner Phönix Sprudel was closed owing to contamination. On 24 May 2009, the municipality celebrated an "Historic Village Festival" with more than 3,500 visitors from Germany and abroad.

== Politics ==
=== Municipal council ===
The council is made up of 16 council members, who were elected by proportional representation at the municipal election held on 7 June 2009, and the honorary mayor as chairman.

The municipal election held on 7 June 2009 yielded the following results:

Year	CDU	WG Schmitz	WG Zander	Total
2009	6	4	6	16 seats

=== Mayors ===
- 29 November 1952 - 9 June 1970 Josef Stadtfeld
- 10 June 1970 - 9 October 1970 Peter Wirtz (resigned)
- 9 October 1970 - 22 October 1970 Hans Heinen (as first deputy after Wirtz's resignation)
- 23 October 1970 - 30 November 1982 Anton Karls
- 1 December 1982 - 2009 Josef Bach
- 2009–2014 Michael Zander
- 2014–2019 Gordon Schnieder
- since 2019 Christiane Stahl

=== Coat of arms ===
The municipality's arms might be described thus: Azure in base a mount of three argent charged with and oakleaf in bend sinister vert, above which a spring with four streams of the second.

== Culture and sightseeing ==
=== Natural monuments ===
- Ice caves, millstone quarries
- Adam & Eva, two pinetrees over 200 years old
- Lindenquelle

=== Buildings ===
- Saint Nicholas's Catholic Church (Kirche St. Nikolaus), Kopper Straße 2, Classicist east tower from 1828, warriors' memorial 1860, 1870/1871, 1914/1918, pillar with figure of the Archangel Michael on pedestal with relief.
- Bahnhofstraße 10 – Classicist house from 1849
- Bahnhofstraße 14 – house from 1899
- Fischbachstraße 6 – estate complex, 19th century, house with knee wall, former cottage/bakehouse, somewhat more recent (?) long commercial building
- Fischbachstraße 18 – plaster building, partly faced, "oven porch"
- Gerolsteiner Straße 21 – Quereinhaus (a combination residential and commercial house divided for these two purposes down the middle, perpendicularly to the street) from 1873
- Gerolsteiner Straße 17, 19, 21 (monument zone) – an unbroken row of two estates parallel to the street and one Quereinhaus (see above), all with eaves facing the street, built in the latter half of the 19th century on the village's northern outskirts, plain houses with right-angled wrought-stone edging, characteristic street design of a 19th-century village expansion.
- Grabenstraße 3 – house from 1846
- Mürlenbacher Straße/corner of Grabenstraße – sandstone wayside cross from 1684
- Rheinische Basalt- u. Lavawerke: Werk Birresborn, old stoneworking factory
- Salmer Straße – sandstone wayside cross from the latter half of the 18th century
- Lindenquelle spring pavilion, north of the village on the road to Lissingen, apparently from 1834
- Wayside cross northwest of the village near Kreisstraße 77

== Economy and infrastructure ==
=== Transport ===
==== Rail ====
The halt at Birresborn lies on the Eifelbahn (Cologne–Euskirchen–Gerolstein–Trier), which here is served by local public rail service between Gerolstein and Trier.

All local public transport is integrated into the Verkehrsverbund Region Trier (VRT), whose fares therefore apply.

==== Road ====
Birresborn lies right on Landesstraße 24.

The nearest Autobahnen are as follows:

- A 1 (towards Cologne) roughly 50 km to the north;
- A 48 (towards Koblenz) roughly 30 km to the west;
- A 60 (towards Wittlich) roughly 25 km to the south.

=== Education ===
Birresborn's only school is the Grundschule Birresborn, a primary school for year grades 1 to 4.

== Church ==
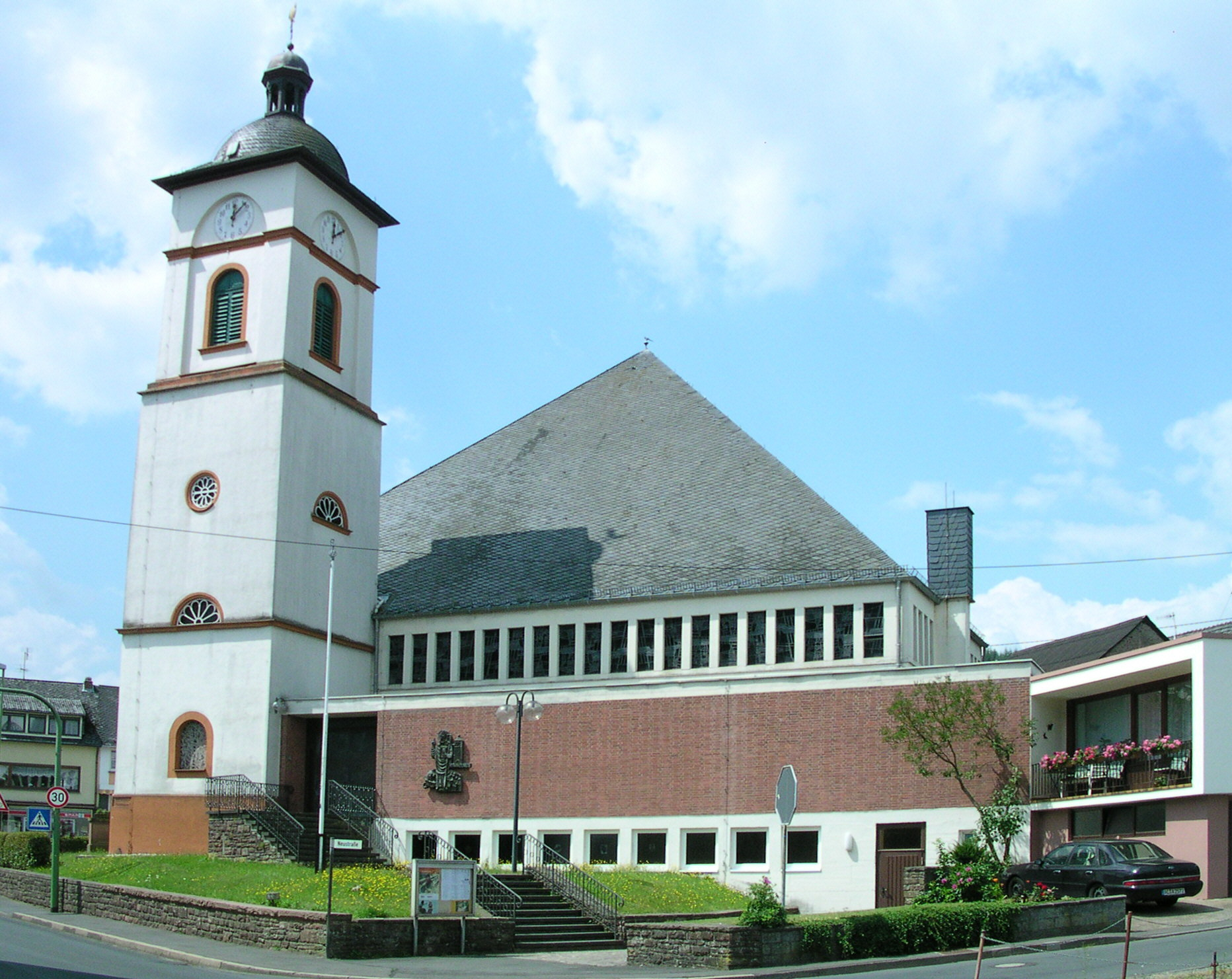
Nikolauskirche

Birresborn is a community whose inhabitants are mainly Catholic. Belonging to the parish of St. Nikolaus Birresborn are also the communities of St. Matthias Kopp, St.Lucia Mürlenbach and Maria Magdalena Densborn. The parish belongs to the Diocese of Trier.

=== Parish priests ===
- The late Helmut Bauerschmitz
- Gerhard Schwan

== Famous people ==
=== Honorary citizens ===
- Dr. Peter Peters (b. 1924, d. 23 July 2009)
