= Kopp, Germany =

Kopp
- Municipality
- Coat of arms

- Location of Kopp within Vulkaneifel district
- Interactive map of Kopp
- Location within Germany Location within Rhineland-Palatinate
- Coordinates: 50°10′39″N 6°35′12″E
- Country: Germany
- State: Rhineland-Palatinate
- District: Vulkaneifel
- Municipal assoc.: Gerolstein

Government
  - Mayor (2019–24): Melanie Stellmes

Area
  - Total: 8.4 km^{2} (3.2 sq mi)
- Elevation: 400–559 m (1,312–1,834 ft)

Population (2025-12-31)
  - Total: 153
  - Density: 18/km^{2} (47/sq mi)
- Time zone: UTC+01:00 (CET)
  - Summer (DST): UTC+02:00 (CEST)
- Postal codes: 54574
- Dialling codes: 06594
- Vehicle registration: DAU

Kopp (German pronunciation: [kɔp]) is an Ortsgemeinde – a municipality belonging to a Verbandsgemeinde, a kind of collective municipality – in the Vulkaneifel district in Rhineland-Palatinate, Germany. It belongs to the Verbandsgemeinde of Gerolstein, whose seat is in the like-named town.

== Geography ==
=== Location ===
The municipality lies in the Vulkaneifel, a part of the Eifel known for its volcanic history, geographical and geological features, and even ongoing activity today, including gases that sometimes well up from the earth.

=== Constituent communities ===
The outlying village of Eigelbach on the bed of a dry maar, the Eigelbacher Maar, is an Ortsteil of Kopp.

== History ==
In 1286, Kopp had its first documentary mention. It was then held by Prüm Abbey. The first hints of settlers in the area, however, date from Roman times (the Roman road between Trier and Cologne was right nearby).

The name Kopp is derived from the German word Kuppe (“knoll”).

In 1576, Kopp passed to the Electorate of Trier. In 1794, after the French had beaten the Austrians, the local nobles found themselves stripped of their fiefs, hunting rights and other feudal privileges by French troops. At first, the French were welcomed as liberators, but public opinion soon shifted to hatred towards people now seen as occupiers. After Napoleon's defeats at Leipzig (1813) and Waterloo (1815), Kopp found itself in Prussian hands.

In the time from the turn of the 20th century to the Second World War, the people led an impoverished life, which was typical for the Eifel. Only after the war did things get better. Today Kopp is a village characteristic of the Eifel, with agriculture, light tourism and weekend daytrippers.

== Politics ==
=== Municipal council ===
The council is made up of 6 council members, who were elected by majority vote at the municipal election held on 7 June 2009, and the honorary mayor as chairman.

=== Mayor ===
Kopp's mayor is Melanie Stellmes.

=== Coat of arms ===
The German blazon reads: In Silber über halber grüner Spitze, darin ein vierspeichiges goldenes Mühlrad, schräg und gegenschräg gestellte rote Axt und grünes Eichenblatt.

The municipality's arms might in English heraldic language be described thus: Per chevron abased argent an axe gules bendwise sinister and an oakleaf vert bendwise in fess, and vert a waterwheel spoked of four Or.

The division of the field in Kopp's arms is canting for the municipality's name, which as already explained comes from a word that means “knoll”. The green peak serves as a graphic representation of such a thing. The gold waterwheel recalls a time when there were important gristmills and sawmills in the Fischbach valley. The axe is Saint Matthew’s attribute, thus representing the municipality’s and the chapel’s patron saint, who was beheaded with an axe. The oakleaf refers not only to the two natural monuments in Kopp, the 300-year-old Stelzeneiche (“Stilt Oak”) in the main centre and the oak in the outlying centre of Eigelbach, but also to the richly wooded municipal area.

== Culture and sightseeing ==
Agriculture and tourism are the municipality's main income sources. Particular points of interest are the 300-year-old Stelzeneiche (“Stilt Oak”), the village chapel and the Birresborn ice caves, one kilometre away.

=== Buildings ===
- Saint Eligius’s Catholic Church (branch church; Filialkirche St. Eligius), Wallersheimer Straße 2, aisleless church, 18th century, porch 1850, red sandstone churchyard cross from 1782.
- Dorfstraße 4 – dwelling half of a Quereinhaus (a combination residential and commercial house divided for these two purposes down the middle, perpendicularly to the street) from 1844.
- Dorfstraße 8 – estate complex, house from 1759?, stately stable-barn.
- Wayside cross, south of the village in the woods.
- Wayside cross, west of the village on the Hundsberg, red sandstone Baroque shaft cross from the 18th century.
