= Roi fainéant =

Monarch who has no real power

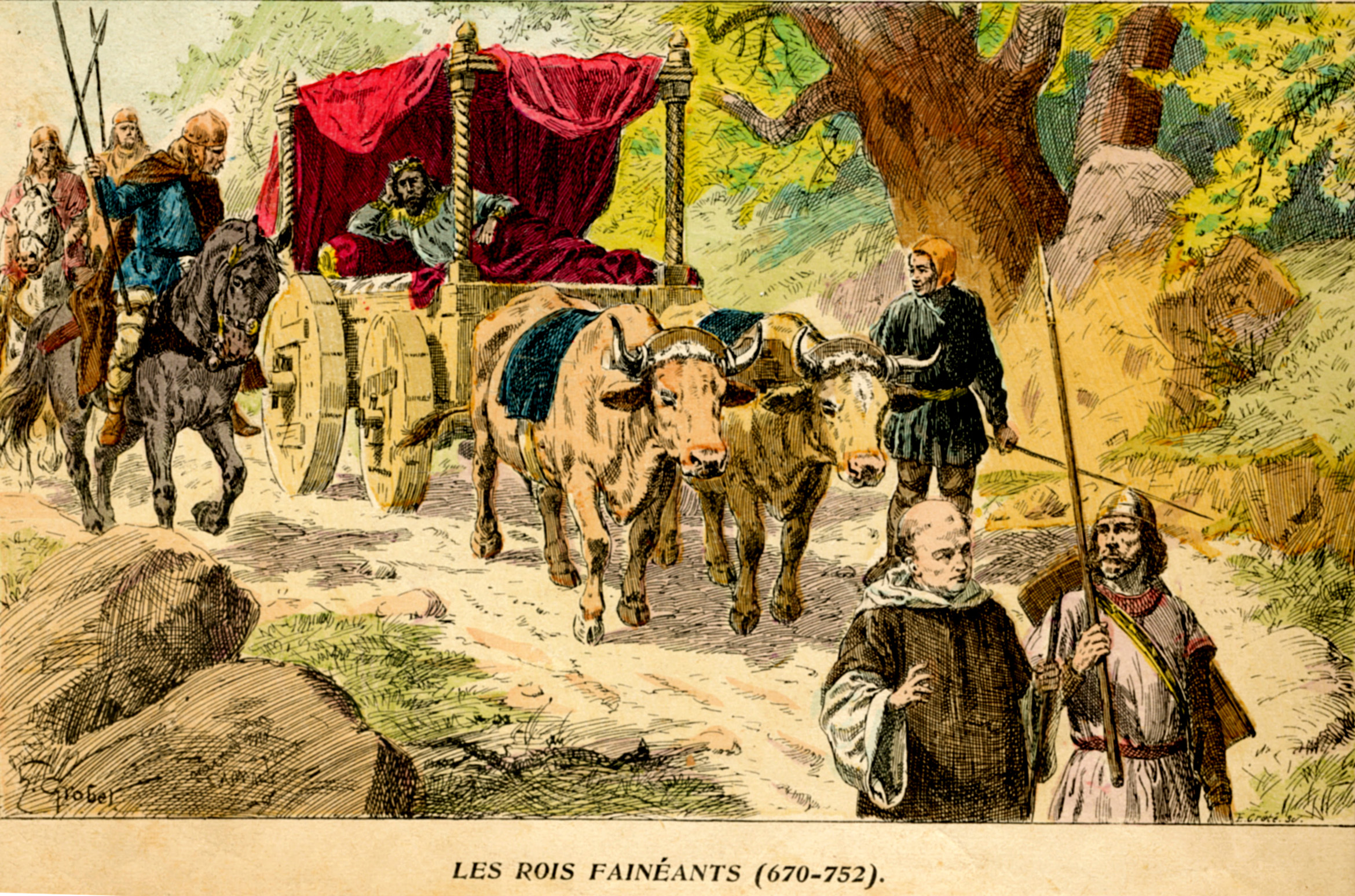
Lithograph of a Merovingian Roi fainéant.

Roi fainéant (French pronunciation: [ʁwa fɛneɑ̃] "do-nothing king", "lazy king") is a French term primarily used to refer to the later kings of the Merovingian dynasty after they seemed to have lost their initial powers of dominion. It is usually applied to those Frankish rulers approximately from the death of Dagobert I in AD 639 (or, alternatively, from the accession of Theuderic III in 673) until the deposition of Childeric III in favour of Pepin the Short in 751.

The appellation goes back to Einhard, who is most notably the author of Vita Karoli Magni, the biographer of Charlemagne; he described the later Merovingian kings as kings "in nothing but in name":

There was nothing left the king to do but to be content with his name of king, his flowing hair, and long beard, to sit on his throne and play the ruler, to give ear to the ambassadors that came from all quarters, and to dismiss them, as if on his own responsibility, in words that were, in fact, suggested to him, or even imposed upon him. He had nothing that he could call his own beyond this vain title of king and the precarious support allowed by the mayor of the palace in his discretion, except a single country seat, that brought him but a very small income.

Latin original text

Neque regi aliud relinquebatur, quam ut regio tantum nomine contentus crine profuso, barba summissa, solio resideret ac speciem dominantis effingeret, legatos undecumque venientes audiret eisque abeuntibus responsa, quae erat edoctus vel etiam iussus, ex sua velut potestate redderet; cum praeter inutile regis nomen et precarium vitae stipendium, quod ei praefectus aulae prout videbatur exhibebat, nihil aliud proprii possideret quam unam et eam praeparvi reditus villam, in qua domum et ex qua famulos sibi necessaria ministrantes atque obsequium exhibentes paucae numerositatis habebat.

— Einhard (translated by S. E. Turner, 1880)

During the century of the rois fainéants, the Merovingian kings were increasingly dominated by their mayors of the palace, in the 6th century the office of the manager of the royal household, but in the 7th increasingly the power behind the throne who limited the role of the king to an essentially ceremonial office.

The last Carolingian ruler, Louis V, was also in his turn nicknamed le Fainéant ("the Do-Nothing"), because his effective rule was limited to the region around Laon.
