= Salm, Germany =

Salm
- Municipality
- Coat of arms

- Location of Salm within Vulkaneifel district
- Interactive map of Salm
- Location within Germany Location within Rhineland-Palatinate
- Coordinates: 50°9′7.76″N 6°41′25.72″E
- Country: Germany
- State: Rhineland-Palatinate
- District: Vulkaneifel
- Municipal assoc.: Gerolstein

Government
  - Mayor (2019–24): Rolf Hoffmann

Area
  - Total: 9.07 km^{2} (3.50 sq mi)
- Elevation: 500–620 m (1,640–2,030 ft)

Population (2025-12-31)
  - Total: 326
  - Density: 35.9/km^{2} (93.1/sq mi)
- Time zone: UTC+01:00 (CET)
  - Summer (DST): UTC+02:00 (CEST)
- Postal codes: 54570
- Dialling codes: 06599
- Vehicle registration: DAU

Salm (German pronunciation: [zalm]) is an Ortsgemeinde – a municipality belonging to a Verbandsgemeinde, a kind of collective municipality – in the Vulkaneifel district in Rhineland-Palatinate, Germany. It belongs to the Verbandsgemeinde of Gerolstein, whose seat is in the like-named town.

== Geography ==
The municipality lies in the Vulkaneifel, a part of the Eifel known for its volcanic history, geographical and geological features, and even ongoing activity today, including gases that sometimes well up from the earth.

Near the village rises the river Salm, which empties into the Moselle near Klüsserath.

== History ==
In 1225, Salm had its first documentary mention in an agreement between Gerhard von Blankenheim and Abbot Heinrich von Himmerod dealing with the donation of an estate to Himmerod Abbey, which was reached on the cobbled road between the abandoned village of Hundswinkel and Bremescheit (Prümscheid). It is reasonable to conclude, therefore, that the village's beginnings reach back somewhat further, but an entry in Prüm Abbey's directory of holdings, the Prümer Urbar, that supposedly mentions Salm is at the very best doubtful. It would, however, make the village centuries older, since it dates from 803.

Salm's early history speaks of well-off townsmen, whose wealth, however, suffered later as the village's population grew. Throughout the ages, the leading sources of income were agriculture and forestry. In the case of the latter, the broad forests even afforded a livelihood in logging.

In the 13th century, the villages of Salm and Hilscheid and the estate of Muckenberg were held by the Counts of Manderscheid.

In 1238, Salm had a church under the patronage of Heinrich, Lord of Manderscheid-Kerpen. In 1608, Kyllburg townsman Petrus von Salm donated to the church the silver-gilt monstrance. By 1687, patronage was being exercised by the nobles of Roben and the heirs of Melbaum. By 1743, it was the Countess of Manderscheid.

On 11 October 1803, during the time of French rule, the Salm Mill (Salmer Mühle), which had belonged to the Counts of Manderscheid, was sold for 186 Thaler. By 1815, Salm belonged to the Kingdom of Prussia. Both before and after the Prussian takeover, extensive surveying and mapping were undertaken, first under Colonel Tranchot (1803-1813) and then under Generalmajor von Müffling (1816-1820).

The Year Without a Summer – 1816 – struck the Eifel hard, bringing famine, floods and weather damage along with it. Snow was still lying on the ground into June. Hay was only harvested in September, and the grain only ripened in October. That same month came frost, and by early November, snow was falling once again. The next year, 1817, the Eifel dwellers suffered under the lingering effects of the foregoing year's disastrous and unusual weather patterns. Common foodstuffs were not so common, and cost much more than usual. People were so hungry that they were eating livestock fodder and roots. The Prussian government helped ease the crisis by making available two million Thaler, and ensuring the poor their daily bread by buying up great quantities of grain from East Prussia.

In 1856, the whole lower village was destroyed in a great fire. One man, who had fallen asleep on some hay, was burnt alive.

Between 1869 and 1871, the Trier-Cologne railway line was built, putting the Ruhr area within much easier reach. The Franco-Prussian War (1870-1871) gave railway building the highest priority. This same time saw the decline of the Eifel's iron industry and an outflow of people to the new industrialized areas. In 1872, there were even advertisements in local newspapers exhorting people to emigrate to the "New World".

In 1887, there was yet again hardship due to the weather. This time it was drought and frost. The latter wrought devastation to fruit crops mainly in the dales, while sparing those higher up. The potato crop was very bad, and the price of potatoes soared that year as a result. Oats likewise yielded a very poor harvest, and the hay failed altogether. Six years later, in 1893, agriculture suffered once more. Summer and autumn were very dry, resulting in a dearth of fodder. Many farmers felt forced to sell their livestock off. Thin brushwood was being crushed and cut up for livestock fodder.

The year 1899, however, was in every respect a good year for farmers. The turn of the 20th century was an uneventful time until the First World War. A savings and loan institution was established in 1903 and a fire brigade in 1910.

On 30 June 1914, news of Archduke Franz Ferdinand's assassination reached Salm, causing great unease. People began to hoard coffee and salt in expectation of the forthcoming war. The western border was militarized, and then on 1 August 1914 came the Mobilization Order from the Emperor. Among other side-effects was a great upswing in prices for various foodstuffs. In 1916, heavy guns could be heard shooting in the Battle of Verdun about 140 km away; the noise was loudest on 14 December.

In 1918, the war ended and Salm was occupied by United States troops. Twenty-four soldiers from Salm fell in the Great War. The Americans were replaced by French occupiers, who did not withdraw until 1930.

In 1920, heavy spring rains and frost in June ensured a poor harvest. On 20 February 1921, elections for the Prussian Landtag were held. In 1925, work began on the local waterworks. The following year, Salm was connected to the district electrical grid. In 1936, the local electricity supplier became the Rheinisch-Westfälische Elektrizitätswerke (RWE).

The years between 1929 and 1931 were a time of great hardship brought on by the Great Depression. As a make-work scheme, men were put to work building a road linking Daun, Bitburg and Trier.

Within a few years, the new Nazi régime led by Adolf Hitler brought along with it not only an upswing in the number of jobs, but also the foreboding of yet another war, especially after Anschluss and Kristallnacht in 1938. The Organisation Todt quartered itself in the Eifel and the second Siegfried Line sprang up. So did a great munitions and fuel dump, in the Salmwald, the local forest. Soldiers from East Prussia were posted as guards.

In 1940, early in the Second World War, Salm and the surrounding region became a deployment area in the runup to the Battle of France, which began on 10 May of that year and ended on 21 June with an armistice. French prisoners of war came to Salm. They were put to work in agriculture to offset the dearth of labour due to the war, and were fed by local families whom they were detailed to help.

In 1944, after the war's fortunes had swung against Germany, the area once again became a military staging area, this time for the Battle of the Bulge, which began on 16 December. Technical problems with the much-vaunted V-1s due to errors in the guidance system and sabotage at the assembly plants by the political prisoners who were forced to work there led 21 of these devices to unintentionally rain down on Salm and the surrounding area. They claimed one life.

Two fliers are known to have crashed in the municipality in 1944. One was German – he was killed after his parachute caught on his falling aircraft – and the other American. He was taken to Daun in custody after a successful parachute jump.

In 1945, the Allied attack on Germany continued in earnest, and this was brought home locally by an airstrike on Rom, a hamlet between Salm and neighbouring Birresborn. Six civilians (including one whole family) and ten soldiers were killed in the attack, and two houses were destroyed. In unrelated action, another American aircraft crashed near Rom in 1945; the pilot managed to save himself.

On 5 March 1945, General George S. Patton's 4th Armored Division overran the area and Salm surrendered without a fight. German forces had already pulled out of the village.

After Germany's capitulation, the American troops, as had been the case after the last war, were replaced by French ones as the whole region found itself in the French Zone of Occupation.

After the war, there followed a time of great neediness. During the 1950s, there was much in the way of cottage industry, including quilting. Many worked as lumberjacks. A lack of apprenticeships in the municipality led many young people to migrate to the Ruhr area.

By 1960, the new road to Gerolstein had been finished. Between 1960 and 1962, Flurbereinigung took place. Mechanized farming began.

In the course of administrative restructuring in Rhineland-Palatinate in 1970, Salm was grouped into the Verbandsgemeinde of Gerolstein in the Daun district, which has since been given the name Vulkaneifel.

In the course of building works for the new sewerage in 1994, remnants of an old wall were unearthed. Nothing is known of its history, except that it is believed to be older than the street under which it runs crosswise.

== Politics ==
=== Municipal council ===
The council is made up of 8 council members, who were elected by majority vote at the municipal election held on 7 June 2009, and the honorary mayor as chairman.

=== Mayor ===
Salm's mayor is Rolf Hoffmann.

=== Coat of arms ===
The German blazon reads: In blauem Schild oben ein rechtsgewendeter silberner Salm, unten ein goldenes Jagdhorn.

The municipality's arms might in English heraldic language be described thus: Azure in chief a salmon argent and in base a bugle-horn Or.

The upper charge is canting for the municipality's name, Salm, which is also a German word for salmon (although the usual one is Lachse); the canting might help clear the mysterious toponymy of the town, which has been theorized to be from a Pre-Indo-European root *Sal(m)- seen through much of Europe (see Old European hydronymy). The salmon also refers to the local river's name, also Salm. The horn is Saint Hubert's attribute, thus representing the municipality's and the church's patron saint.

== Culture and sightseeing ==
Buildings:

- Saint Hubert's Catholic Parish Church (Pfarrkirche St. Hubertus) Kirchweg 1 – 1830.
- Hauptstraße 38 – former rectory (?), representative Classicist plastered building, from 1863.

== Economy and infrastructure ==
The municipality lies on Bundesstraße 257.
