= Theuderic III =

7th-century Frankish king

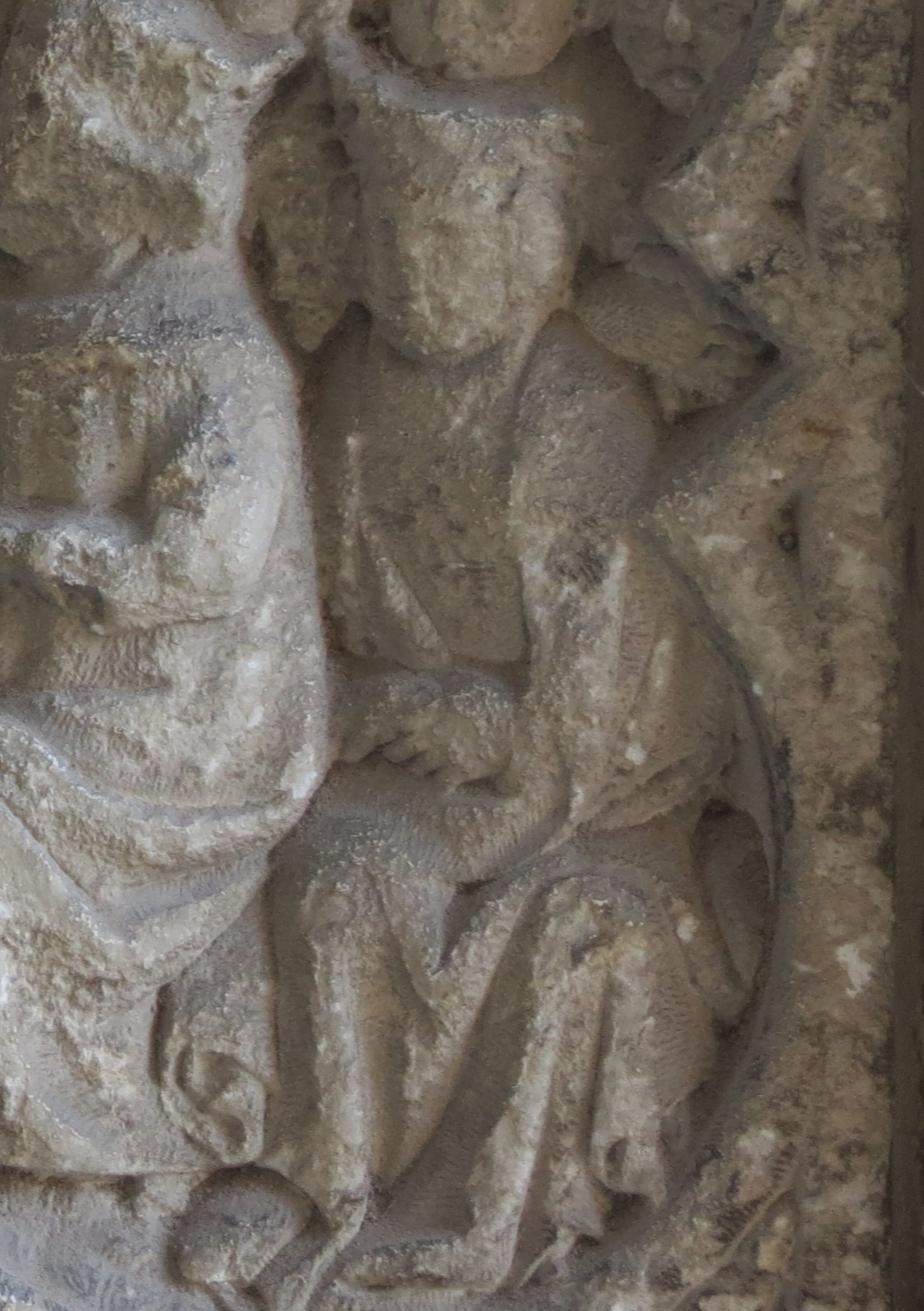
- Detail of a medallion on exterior of Saint-Ouen Abbey, Rouen, c.750

King in Neustria and Burgundy
- Reign: 673
- Predecessor: Chlothar III
- Successor: Childeric II
- Reign: 675–691
- Predecessor: Childeric II
- Successor: Clovis IV

King in Austrasia
- Reign: 679
- Predecessor: Dagobert II
- Successor: Clovis IV

King of the Franks
- Reign: 679–691
- Predecessor: Vacant (last held by Childeric II)
- Successor: Clovis IV
- Born: c. 651
- Died: c. 691 (aged 39–40)
- Spouse: Chrothildis
- Issue: Clovis IV; Childebert III; Bertrada of Prüm (?)
- Dynasty: Merovingian
- Father: Clovis II
- Mother: Balthild

Theuderic III (also spelled Theuderich, Theoderic or Theodoric; French: Thierry, c. 651–691) was king of the Franks in the 7th century. He ruled Neustria and Burgundy on two occasions (in 673 and again from 675 to 691), as well as Austrasia from 679 until his death in 691.

The son of Clovis II and Balthild, Theuderic has been described as a puppet ruler – a roi fainéant. After the death of his older brother Chlothar III, he was appointed king in Neustria by Ebroin, mayor of the palace, in 673, though Childeric II of Austrasia displaced him soon thereafter. After Childeric II was killed in 675, Theuderic II retook the throne. He subsequently fought a war against Dagobert II, with his forces under Ebroin victorious at the Battle of Lucofao. After Dagobert was murdered in 679, Theuderic was also recognized as king in Austrasia as well.

He and the Neustrian mayor of the palace, Waratton, made peace with Pepin of Heristal, mayor of the palace of Austrasia, in 681. However, on Waratton's death in 686, the new mayor, Berchar, made war with Austrasia and Pepin vanquished the Burgundo-Neustrian army under Berchar and Theuderic (a Neustrian) at the Battle of Tertry in 687, thus paving the way for Austrasian dominance of the Frankish state.

== Marriage and offspring ==
Theuderic married Chrothildis, a daughter of Ansegisel and Saint Begga of Landen.

They had the following children:

- Clovis IV, king (677–694)
- Childebert III, king (678/679–711)
- (Possibly) Bertrada of Prüm, abbess of Prüm (660 – after 721)

== Bibliography ==
- Fouracre, Paul; Gerberding, Richard A. (1996). Late Merovingian France: History and Hagiography, 640-720. Manchester University Press. ISBN 978-0-7190-4791-6.
- Fouracre, Paul J. (2018). "Theuderic III". In Nicholson, Oliver (ed.). The Oxford Dictionary of Late Antiquity. Oxford University Press.
- Frassetto, Michael (2013). Early Medieval World, The: From the Fall of Rome to the Time of Charlemagne. Vol. One, A–M. ABC-CLIO.
- Kortum, Hans-Henning (2010). "Franks, Merovingians: Narrative (482-751)". In Rogers, Clifford J. (ed.). The Oxford Encyclopedia of Medieval Warfare and Military Technology. Vol. 2. Oxford University Press. pp. 125–132.
- McConville, Julia (2018). "Clovis III". In Nicholson, Oliver (ed.). The Oxford Dictionary of Late Antiquity. Oxford University Press.
- Verseuil, Jean (1996). Les rois fainéants: De Dagobert à Pépin le Bref (629-651) (in French). Paris: Critérion. pp. 179–199. ISBN 978-2-7413-0196-7.
- Wallace-Hadrill, John Michael (1962). "V. Les rois faineants". The long-haired kings: and other studies in Frankish history. Methuen. ISBN 9780416255201.
- Wood, Ian (2014). The Merovingian Kingdoms 450 - 751. Routledge. pp. 221, 227, 362. ISBN 978-1-317-87116-3.

=== Further reading ===
- Carlrichard Brühl; Theo Kölzer; Martina Hartmann (2001). Die Urkunden der Merowinger. Monumenta Germaniae historica., Diplomata regum Francorum e stirpe Merovingica. (in German and Latin). Vol. 2 vols. Hannover: Hahn. ISBN 978-3-7752-5464-9.

Theuderic III Merovingian dynasty Born: 650s Died: 691
Preceded by Chlothar III	King of the Franks in Neustria and Burgundy; 673	Succeeded by Childeric II
Preceded by Childeric II	King of the Franks in Neustria and Burgundy; 675–691	Succeeded by Clovis IV
Preceded by Dagobert II	King of the Franks in Austrasia; 679–691	Succeeded by Clovis IV
