= Clovis IV =

King of the Franks

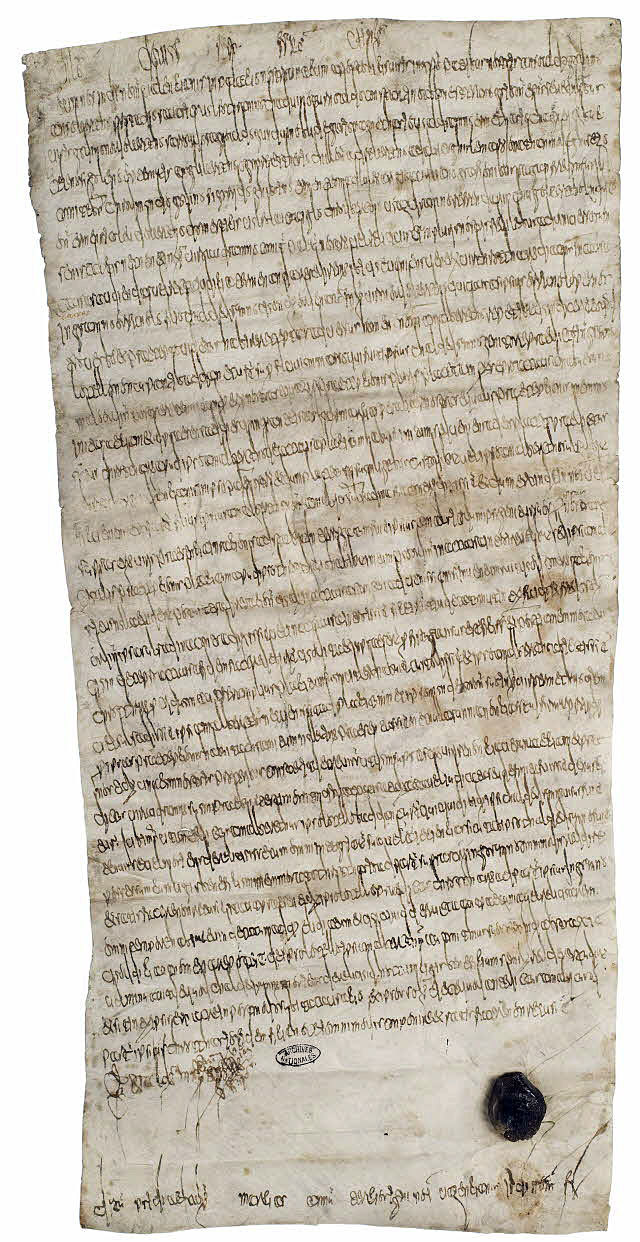
- A written judgement issued by Clovis IV on 28 February 693

King of the Franks
- Reign: 691–694
- Predecessor: Theuderic III
- Successor: Childebert III
- Mayor of the Palace: Pepin of Herstal
- Born: c. 677
- Died: 694 (aged 16–17)
- Dynasty: Merovingian
- Father: Theuderic III
- Mother: Chrodochild

Clovis IV (c. 677–694/695) was the king of the Franks from 690 or 691 until his death. If the brief reign of Clovis III (675) is ignored as a usurpation, then Clovis IV may be numbered Clovis III.

A member of the Merovingian dynasty, Clovis was the son of King Theuderic III and Queen Chrodochild. He was born around 677 or possibly towards 682. He succeeded his father as the sole ruler of the Franks upon the latter's death in 690 or 691. He ruled an undivided kingdom including Austrasia, Burgundy and Neustria. According to the Annals of Metz, a pro-Pippinid source, he was appointed by Pippin of Herstal, the mayor of the palace of Austrasia, and reigned four years.

Clovis was a minor at his accession, and real power was in Pippin's hands. His minority, coming as it did on the heels of his father's efforts to strengthen royal power, was an important factor in the decline of the Merovingian dynasty. Clovis resided primarily in Compiègne (the traditional site of the Marchfield) and Montmacq.

Nine of Clovis's charters have been edited and published. Four of them are records of placita (public judicial hearings) held in the king's presence. Despite the rise of Pippin and his family, which is a major theme of the Annals of Metz, the royal court was still important in Clovis's reign. During a placitum in Valenciennes in 693, Clovis was attended by twelve bishops, twelve viri illustres (including Nordebert, the Neustrian mayor of the palace), nine counts and numerous other officials. The future Neustrian mayor of the palace Ragamfred started out as a domesticus under Clovis. Warno, the Neustrian comes palatii of Chilperic II, also began his career at the court of Clovis.

In 692, Clovis confirmed for the Abbey of Saint-Denis the right to collect certain tolls in Marseille, a right which it had been granted by Dagobert I. He also granted to the Abbey of Saint-Médard the nearby house that had been the primary residence of the former mayor of the palace, Ebroin, in Soissons.

The anonymous continuator of the Chronicle of Fredegar devotes two sentences to Clovis IV: "King Theuderic died ... and his little son Clovis was chosen to succeed him as king. But it was not long before King Clovis fell ill and died, having reigned four years." He died in either 694 or 695. He was succeeded by his brother, Childebert III. Clovis does not appear to have made much of an impression on his contemporaries; his brother was more highly regarded.

== Sources ==
- Geary, Patrick J. (1988). Before France and Germany: The Creation and Transformation of the Merovingian World. Oxford: Oxford University Press.
- Gerberding, Richard A. (1987). The Rise of the Carolingians and the Liber Historiae Francorum. Oxford: Oxford University Press.
- Grierson, Philip; Blackburn, Mark (2007). Medieval European Coinage, Volume 1: The Early Middle Ages (5th–10th Centuries). Cambridge: Cambridge University Press.
- McConville, Julia (2018). "Clovis III". In Nicholson, Oliver (ed.). The Oxford Dictionary of Late Antiquity. Oxford University Press.
- Vergauteren, F. (1928). "Étude critique d'un diplôme attribué à Chilpéric I". Revue belge de Philologie et d'Histoire. 7 (1): 83–112. doi:10.3406/rbph.1928.6486.
- Wallace-Hadrill, J. M., ed. (1960). The Fourth Book of the Chronicle of Fredegar with its Continuations. Thomas Nelson and Sons.
- Wood, Ian N. (1994). The Merovingian Kingdoms, 450–751. Harlow: Longman.

Clovis IV Merovingian dynasty Born: 677 Died: 695
Preceded by Theuderic III	King of the Franks; 691–695	Succeeded by Childebert III
