= Charibert of Laon =

Count of Laon

Charibert (died bef. 762), also spelled Caribert and Heribert, Count of Laon, was the maternal grandfather of Charlemagne. Charibert was the father of Charlemagne's mother, Bertrada of Laon.

Only Charibert's mother, Bertrada of Prüm, is known from contemporary records as the two signed the foundation act of the Abbey of Prüm in 721. The same year, also with his mother, he made a donation to the Abbey of Echternach. Charibert's father was possibly Duke Martin.

The name of Charibert's wife is not known. Charibert had one daughter:

- Bertrada of Laon, who married Pippin the Younger, mayor of the palace of Neustria and Burgundy and later king of the Franks.

Charibert died before 762, as stated in an act of his daughter and son-in-law.

== Sources ==
- Settipani, Christian. Les Ancêtres de Charlemagne. Paris. 1989.
- Settipani, Christian, Addendum to the Ancestors of Charlemagne, 1990 (PDF)
