= Ascaricus and Merogaisus =

Fourth-century Frankish ruler

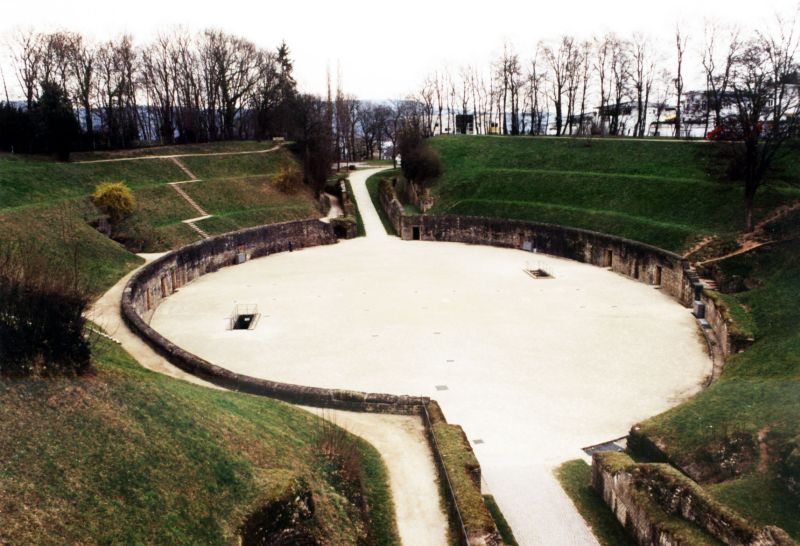
Amphitheatre at Trier in which Ascaric and Merogais were executed along with numerous Frankish soldiers.

Ascaric or Ascarich (Latin: Ascaricus) and Merogais (Latin: Merogaisus, French: Ragaise) were early Frankish war leaders, who are the earliest known leaders explicitly called Frankish, although the name of the Franks is earlier.

The Germanic name Ascaric is a compound of two elements, clearly identified as asca- "ash tree" and -riks "ruler".

== Historical incident involving Ascaric and Merogais ==
=== Sources ===
The sources for the appearance of Ascaric and Merogais in history are few, but were written within a few years of their deaths in contemporary times. They are considered reliable. They are mentioned in a collection of recorded speeches from the period called the Panegyrici latini. These were numbered more or less at random. Only three of the twelve are concerned with the Frankish invasions of Gaul in the late 3rd and early 4th centuries: numbers IX, VI and VII. Only VI provides any significant detail. The authors of VI and VII, conventionally entitled "Panegyric of Constantine" and "Panegyric of Maximian and Constantine" respectively, remain unknown and are therefore typically called "anonymous." Number IX, the earliest, which precedes any of the events involving the two war leaders, is termed "Eumenius for the Restoration of the Schools" because in it the orator quotes a letter from Constantius Chlorus identifying him as Eumenius. In addition Eutropius makes some mention of the period.

The very existence of Merogais depends on the manuscript reading of Johann Kaspar Zeuss. The sentence which names the two kings begins with Asacari or Assaccari in all manuscripts, but it ends with the corrupt forms cinere gaisique, cumero geasique, cymero craisique, and cymero caisique. Zeuss reads those sentences as ending respectively cum Neregaisique, cum Merogeasique, cum Merocraisique, and cum Merocaisique, each meaning as "and with Merogais".

The earliest of the three panegyrics, IX, delivered at Lyon or Autun by Eumenius to the governor of the province, which was probably Lugdunensis II between the Seine and the Loire, on the occasion of a visit, begs the governor to restore the Maenianae school of Autun, and contributes his own salary to the effort. Only background information about the Franks is given. They assisted the pretender Carausius, the temporary ruler of Britain and parts of Gaul. When the imperial government stabilized after a dynastic struggle, Constantius Chlorus reconquered northwestern Gaul, ejected the Franks from there and proceeded to the liberation of Britain. The speech, made in 297 or 298, immediately after the reconquest, in the ruins of the city, presented a letter from Constantius expressing his desire to do something for the children of Gaul and appointing Eumenius, a member of the imperial staff, whose grandfather had been headmaster, to rebuild the school.

Panegyric VII is a speech delivered to Constantine I on the occasion of his taking the senior emperor's, Maximian's, daughter in marriage in 307. By then the Franks have been cleared out of Gaul a second time. The two chiefs have just been executed. The mood is festive. The speaker brags of the treatment meted out to the treacherous Franks. The mood did not last, as once again the emperors became embroiled in conflict. By 310 Maximian is dead, his daughter repudiated, and Constantine is senior emperor. An uneasy peace has been restored in Gaul.

In Panegryric VI, on the anniversary of the foundation of Trier a middle-aged school-teacher from Autun and former member of the imperial court addresses the emperor, guest of the celebration, at the beginning of August. He could be Eumenius, but there is no proof that he is. The emperor has just successfully struck a blow against the Bructeri. The speaker reveals the details but a note of fear manages to pervade the speech. Let the Franks retaliate, he says. We know they can cross the Rhine anywhere at any time they choose. Our defense is such terror that they will fear even to approach the bank. There are forts and ships on every landing place. We don't fear them.

Eutropius has only the summary statement that Constantine, having defeated the Franks and the Alamanni, had their kings torn to pieces by wild beasts in the arena.

=== Accession of Constantine ===
According to Panegyric VI, the young Constantine I began his reign by suppressing Frankish raids across the Rhine in the country of the later Ripuarian Franks (who may well have been known by that name, but more likely only after they had settled in Lower Germany). Motivated by the desire to restore the peace by quelling "some contemptible band of barbarians who tested the very beginnings of your [his] reign with a sudden attack and unexpected brigandage," he brought an army back from Britain, where his father, Constantius Chlorus, Augustus of the empire, had been conducting a punitive campaign against the Picts in 305. Chlorus died at York of natural causes in 306 after a successful campaign. On his deathbed he asked that the troops proclaim his son Augustus in his place. After a quick voice vote shouted throughout the camp they "threw the purple" (an imperial robe) over him as he wept. He attempted to escape by horse but the empire pursued and brought him back. Accepting the command he proceeded "to punish with the ultimate penalty the kings of Francia themselves, who took the opportunity of your [his] father's absence to violate the peace."

The command was subsequently confirmed by the senior emperor, Galerius, who insisted he take the role of Caesar, or junior emperor. Rome had been sharing the burdensome and dangerous highest office between multiple emperors for some time, at that time two, junior and senior. Dynastic struggles were a frequent distraction, which the Franks could always be counted on to exploit to the fullest, from which they acquired the reputation of being mobile, "treacherous," a serious character flaw in the Roman ethic, and one always punished severely.

=== The Frankish expedition ===
In 306 Ascaric and Merogais led a Frankish raid across the Rhine into southern Gaul while Constantius Chlorus was campaigning against the Picts in Britannia. Apparently the Franks or the Bructeri (their tribe) had made a previous agreement with Rome, since Chlorus' successor, his son Constantine I, sought to punish them as traitors upon his return. The two chieftains were defeated, captured, and executed "for their past crimes", an act which "bound with fear the slippery loyalty of the whole race," according to one of the emperor's anonymous panegyrists. The execution took place in one of the chief cities of Gaul, probably Trier, Constantine's capital in Gaul, and the two Franks and their followers were torn apart by animals in the amphitheatre before a large crowd. Their defeat was followed by a punitive expedition against the tribe from which they had conducted the raid, the Bructeri.

=== Retaliation against the Bructeri ===
Having made an example of the two war leaders, Constantine judged that it was not enough of an object lesson. In addition, "so that the enemy should not merely grieve over the punishment of their kings," he determined to conduct a punitive raid on the Bructeri, presumably the tribe of the two leaders. The Romans viewed them as important kings of the Franks. They were probably not that, as the term Francia comprised all the tribes on the right bank of the Rhine. They had undoubtedly followed the Frankish custom of proposing an expedition, which the subsequent action of the Romans supports, and therefore their status could have been any of respect and import. As war chiefs, they were commanders of the expedition. Constantine was going to hold responsible all the villages that had supported the expedition.

The Bructeri were located in the vicinity of Wuppertal, opposite the site of the future Düsseldorf, not far downstream from the Frankish city of Cologne, later the capital city of the Ripuarian Franks. They were relative newcomers to the area, having been allowed to settle there from further downstream by the Ubii. Constantine struck the Bructeri in 308 by surprise to prevent them from escaping through the woods and marshes. He killed or captured the target population with their herds and burned several villages. He then made a selection:

"The adults who were captured, those whose untrustworthiness made them unfit for military service and whose ferocity for slavery, were given over to the amphitheater for punishment, and their great numbers wore out the raging beasts."

He did not depopulate the tribe or the region, as they remained to participate in subsequent historical events, nor did he subject them. The limits of the empire remained the Rhine river. Moreover, the Panegyric implies that, not only were Franks serving in the Roman military, but that Frankish prisoners of war might be given that option as well.
