= Eigil of Prüm =

Abbot of Prüm (died 870)

Eigil (died 29 May 870), also spelled Eigel, Eogil, Egil, Egilo or Heigil, was the abbot of Prüm from 853 to 860, abbot of Flavigny from 860 to 865 and archbishop of Sens from 865 until his death.

Eigil was a monk at Prüm in August 843, when he was the recipient of two letters from Lupus of Ferrières. Like his fellow monk Ansbald and Abbot Markward, he cooperated with Lupus to collate classical texts. In a letter to Markward, Lupus writes that "Eigil, the faithful interpreter of my affairs, will explain what I want you to do in regard to Suetonius and Josephus." Eigil and several other monks of Prüm visited the abbey of Ferrières in the summer of 847, after having recovered from a serious illness.

Eigil succeeded Markward as abbot in 853. Five diplomas in favour of Prüm were issued by the Emperor Lothair I during 853–855. He fell out with his successor, King Lothair II, over the latter's divorce from Theutberga.

Eigil was still abbot of Prüm when he attended the Council of Aachen on 9 January 860, which dealt with Lothair's attempted divorce. Not long after, he voluntarily resigned his abbacy and relocated to West Francia, perhaps claiming illness. He was granted the abbacy of Flavigny by King Charles the Bald later that year or in 861. He was present when the king gave the original copy of the Annals of Saint-Bertin to Archbishop Hincmar of Reims. He transferred the relics of Saint Regina to Flavigny.

Eigil succeeded Wenilo as archbishop of Sens in 865. He discontinued Wenilo's rivalry with Hincmar. He presided over the Council of Soissons in 866 concerning the dispute over clerics ordained by Ebbo. He crossed the Alps to deliver the council's letter to Pope Nicholas I and also to act as Charles the Bald's envoy in the case of the divorce of Lothair II. In two letters of 866, Hincmar wrote to him about the prison conditions of the accused heretic Gottschalk of Orbais and about the case of Ebbo's clerics. On 20 May 867, according to the Annals of Saint-Bertin, Eigil "brought to the lord Charles letters from Pope Nicholas to Lothar and the bishops of his realm concerning the case of his wives ... [and] transmitted the pope's command that Waldrada be sent to Rome."

== Bibliography ==
- Gillis, Matthew Bryan (2017). Heresy and Dissent in the Carolingian Empire: The Case of Gottschalk of Orbais. Oxford University Press.
- Heidecker, Karl (2010) [1997]. The Divorce of Lothar II: Christian Marriage and Political Power in the Carolingian World. Translated by Tanis M. Guest. Cornell University Press.
- Levillain, Léon (1949). "Wandalbert de Prüm et la date de la mort d'Hilduin de Saint-Denis". Bibliothèque de l'école des chartes. 108: 5–35.
- Nelson, Janet L., ed. (1991). The Annals of St-Bertin. Manchester University Press.
- Pohl, Benjamin (2023). Abbatial Authority and the Writing of History in the Middle Ages. Oxford University Press.
- Regenos, Graydon W., ed. (1966). The Letters of Lupus of Ferrières. Martinus Nijhoff.
- Stone, Rachel; West, Charles, eds. (2016). The Divorce of King Lothar and Queen Theutberga: Hincmar of Rheims's De divortio. Manchester University Press.
- Tellenbach, Gerd (1962). "Der Konvent der Reichsabtei Prüm unter Abt Ansbald (860–886)" (PDF). In Werner Fleischhauer; Walter Grube; Paul Zinsmaier (eds.). Neue Beiträge zur südwestdeutschen Landesgeschichte: Festschrift für Max Miller, dargebracht v. Freunden und Kollegen. Stuttgart. pp. 1–10.
