= Basilica of the Transfiguration of Our Lord, Prüm =

Basilica of the Transfiguration of Our Lord
- Basilika St. Salvator
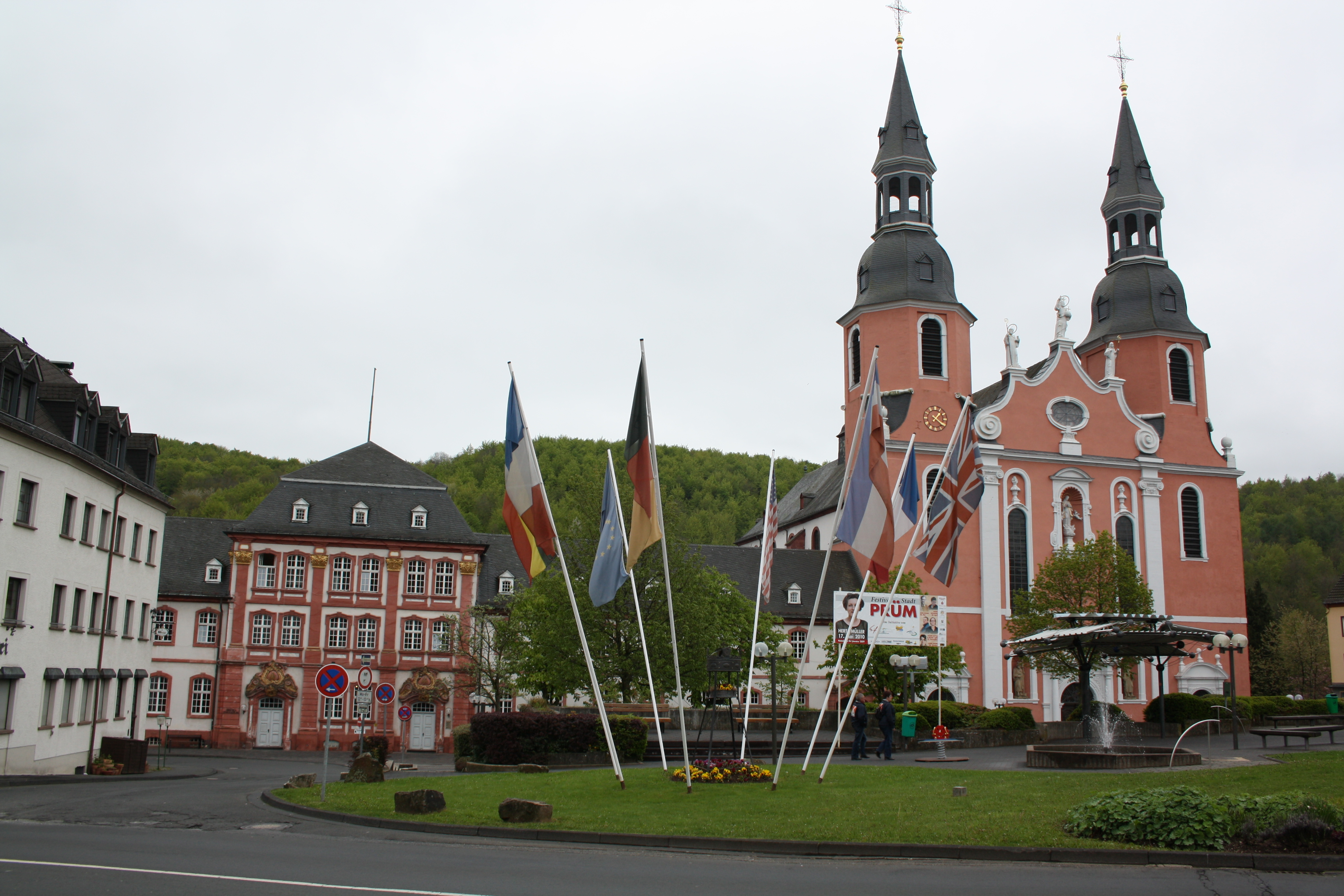

- Location within Rhineland-Palatinate Location within Germany
- 50°12′23″N 6°25′32″E
- Location: Prüm, Rhineland-Palatinate
- Country: Germany
- Denomination: Roman Catholic Church
- Website: https://www.pfarreiengemeinschaft-pruem.de/

The Basilica of the Transfiguration of Our Lord (also called Prüm Basilica; German: Basilika St. Salvator; Verklärung Christi-Basilika) is a Catholic church in the West Eifel, Germany, and a papal minor basilica dedicated to the Holy Savior and the Transfiguration of Christ. Formerly, it was the abbey church of the old abbey of Prüm, founded by the Benedictine order. It depends on the bishopric of Trier.

Balthasar Neumann, Johann Georg Judas and Pablo Kurz were architects from different backgrounds with different skills who worked on it. It can be seen that the construction of the abbey no longer presents the dynamic form of Neumann's early works, since it was later realized, despite its northern façade is one of the best in the Eifel region or the entire region of the Rhine. While in other impressive monastery regions were built, in the region of Trier between 1676 and 1729 years no important monument was made. The Basilica holds the Sandals of Jesus Christ.

== See also ==
- Roman Catholicism in Germany
- Transfiguration of Our Lord

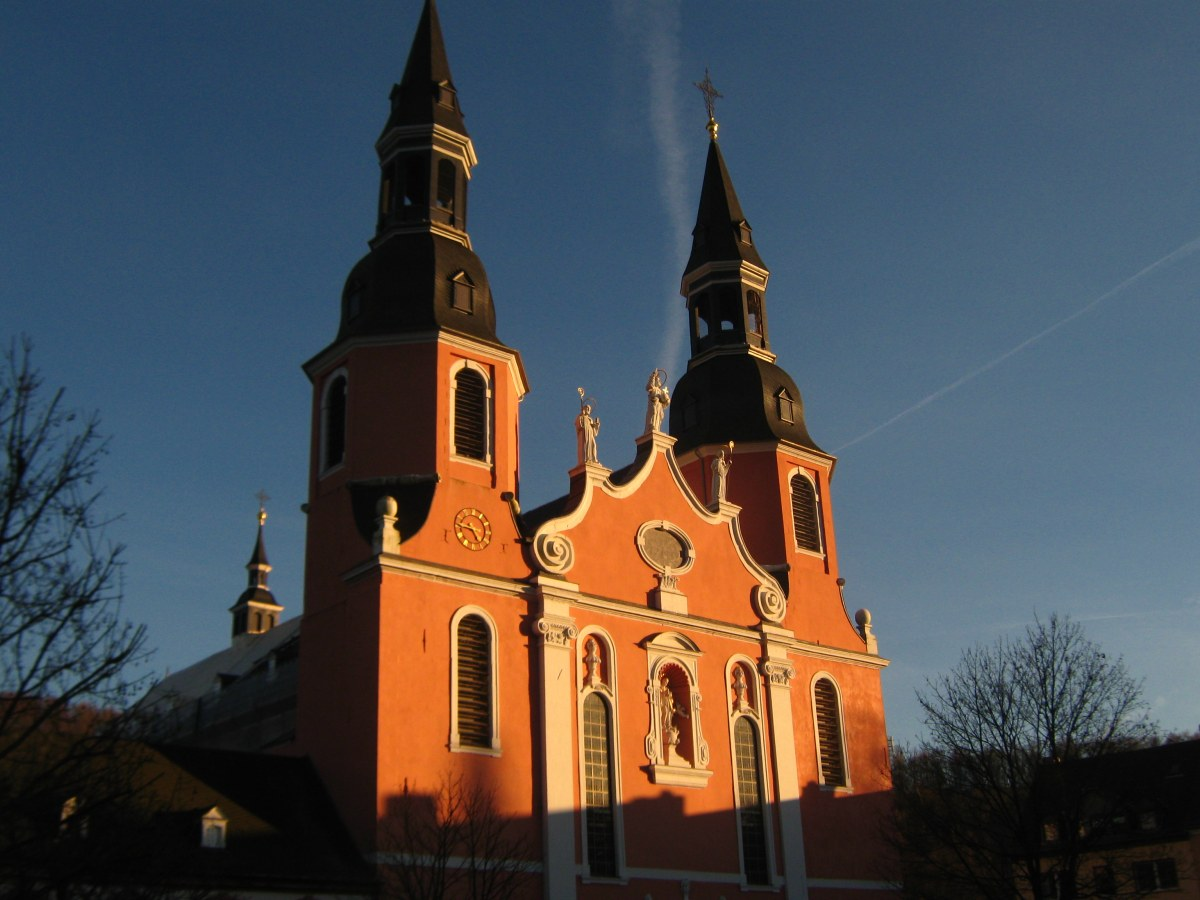
Another view
