= Chrothildis =

Frankish queen consort to king Theuderic III

Chrothildis (7th-century – 692 CE) (also called Clothild, Chrodhild, Clotilde) was a Frankish queen consort by marriage to king Theuderic III. After Theuderic III's death she was formally the nominal regent for her son Clovis IV during his minority from his succession in 691 (when he was nine) until her own death in 692. However, in reality her brother, Pepin of Herstal, controlled the government.
