= Bertrada of Laon =

Queen consort of the Franks (died 783)

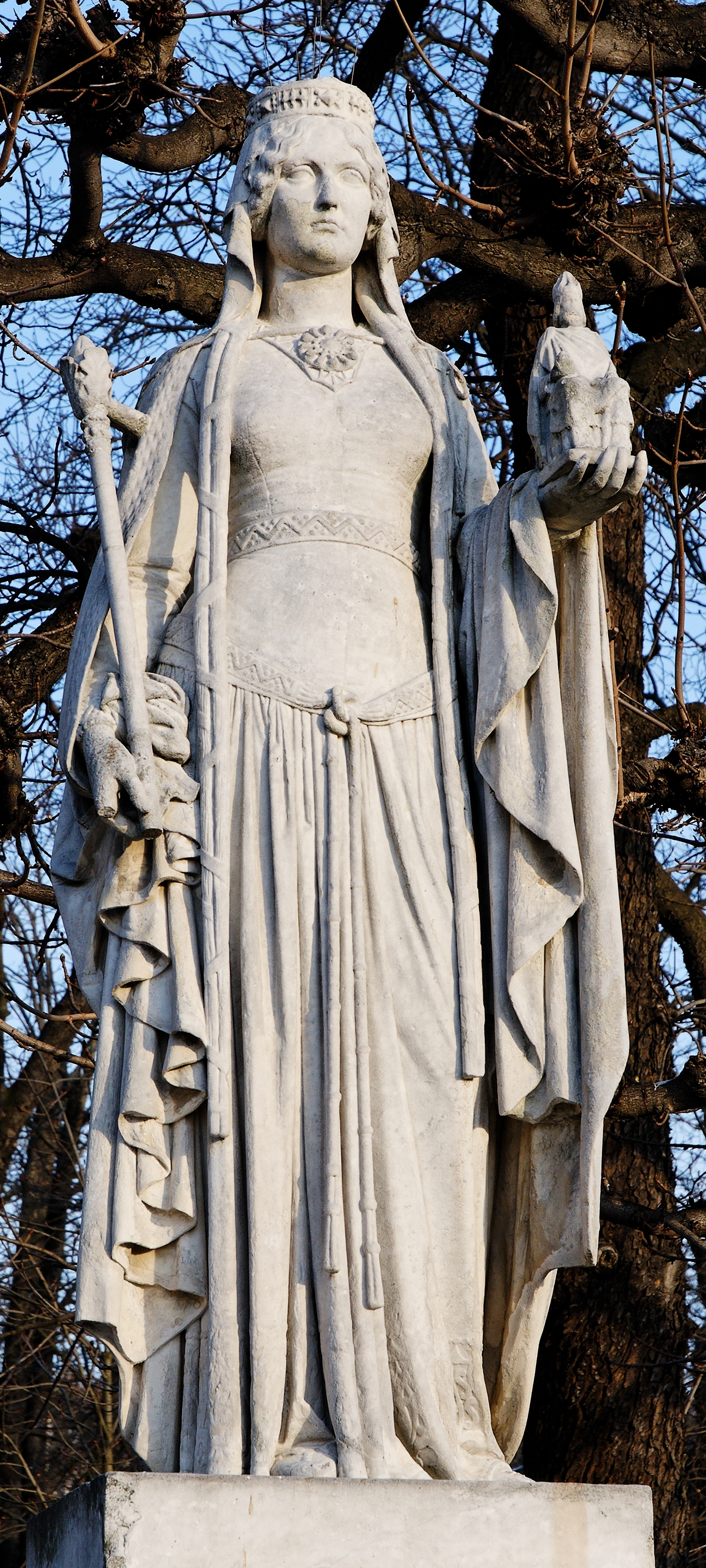
- Statue of Bertrada by Eugène Oudiné, one of the twenty Reines de France et Femmes illustres in the Jardin du Luxembourg, Paris

Queen consort of the Franks
- Tenure: November 751 – 24 September 768
- Born: between 710 and 727; Laon, Francia
- Died: 12 July 783; Choisy-au-Bac, Francia
- Burial: Saint Denis Basilica
- Spouse: Pepin the Short
- Issue: Charlemagne; Carloman; Gisela
- Father: Charibert of Laon
- Religion: Roman Catholicism

Bertrada of Laon (born between 710 and 727 – 12 July 783), also known as Bertrada the Younger or Bertha Broadfoot (cf. Latin: Regina pede aucae, i.e. the queen with the goose-foot), was the first Carolingian Frankish queen. An enduring influence in Frankish politics, she was the wife of Pepin the Short and the mother of Charlemagne, Carloman and Gisela, plus five other children. Her marriage with Pepin was influential in trend setting for future marriages blessed by the pope. She also held considerable influence over Charlemagne and Carloman after Pepin had died, enduring even past her death and through Charlemagne’s eventual rule as the sole King of the Franks.

== Biography ==
=== Early life and ancestry ===
Bertrada was born sometime between 710 and 727 in Laon, in today's Aisne, France, to Count Charibert of Laon. Charibert's father might have been related to Hugobertides. The Annals of St. Bertin also posit a connection between Bertrada and the previous Merovingian dynasty through Charibert. This would have been a desirable match for Pepin in securing his legitimacy of his reign after successfully deposing the Merovingian kings. Charibert's mother was Bertrada of Prüm, who founded Prüm Abbey along with Charibert.

=== Marriage and children ===
Bertrada married Pepin the Short, the son of Charles Martel, the Frankish "Mayor of the Palace", in around 740 or 741. Bertrada was of Merovingian descent, likely meaning that she was in a position to bring legitimacy to Pepin, who had overthrown Childeric III, the last Merovingian king. However, Pepin and Bertrada were too closely related for their marriage to be legal at that time; the union was not canonically sanctioned until 749, after the birth of Charlemagne.

According to French historian Léon Levillain, Bertrada was Pepin's first and only wife. Other sources suggest that Pepin had previously married a "Leutberga" or "Leutbergie", with whom Pepin would have had five children.

Bertrada and Pepin are known to have had eight children: at least three sons and at least four daughters. Of these, Charlemagne (c. 742 – 814), Carloman (751–771) and Gisela (757–811) survived to adulthood. Pepin, born in 756, died young in 762. Bertrada and Pepin also had Berthe, Adelaide, and Rothaide. Gisela became a nun at Chelles Abbey.

=== Queen of the Franks ===
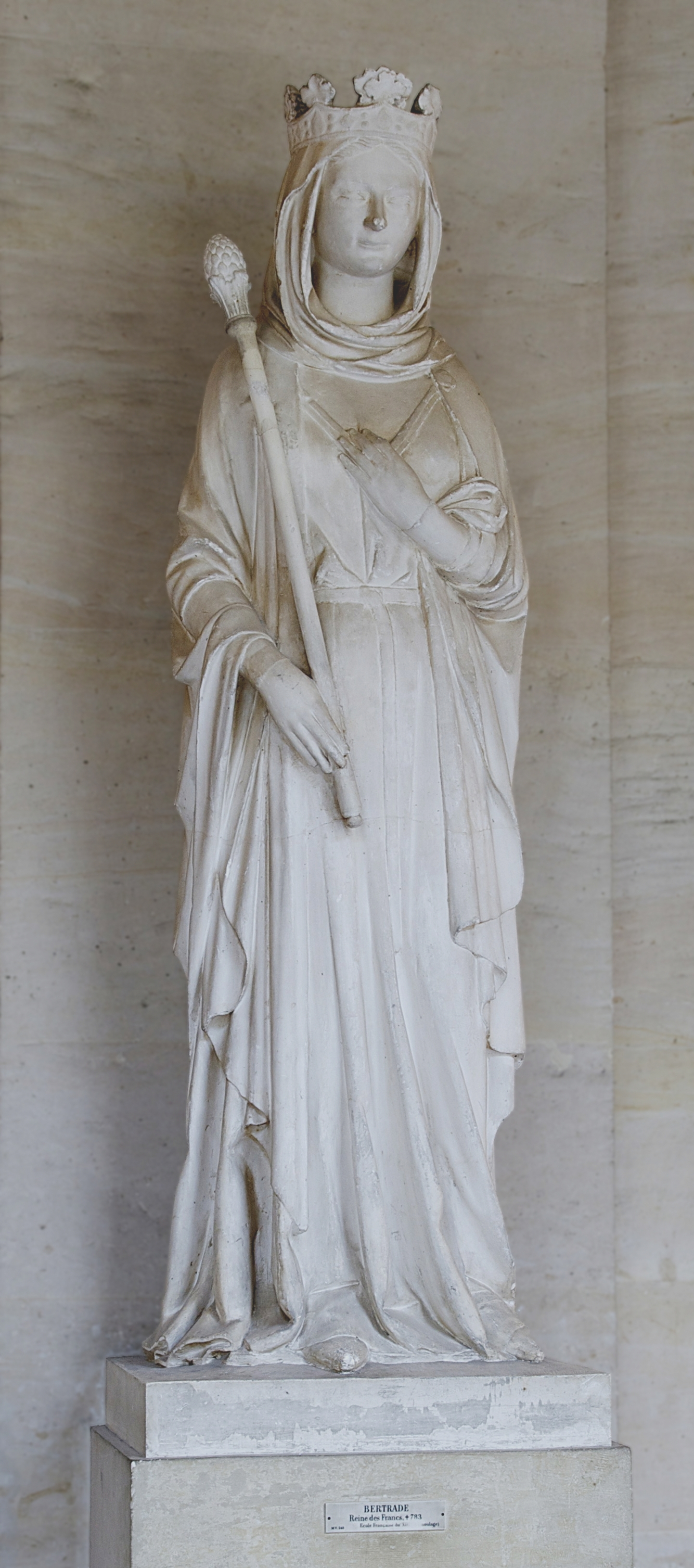
Bertrada of Laon, at Versailles

In 751, Pepin and Bertrada became King and Queen of the Franks, following Pepin's successful coup against the Frankish Merovingian monarchs. Pepin was crowned in June 754, and Bertrada, Charlemagne, and Carloman were blessed by Pope Stephen II. This was a significant gesture as it solidified the legitimacy of Pepin’s rule. The decision to anoint Bertrada alongside Pepin appears to be a conscious decision to emphasize the connection between himself and the previous Merovingian monarchs.

As Queen of the Franks, Bertrada would have possessed a great deal of influence in matters of marriage negotiations, diplomacy, selection of heirs. After Pepin's death in 768, Bertrada lost her title as Queen of the Franks. Charlemagne and Carloman inherited the two halves of Pepin's kingdom. Bertrada stayed at the court and often tried to stop arguments between the two brothers. Bertrada’s frequent travels between the brothers’ courts, as well as her diplomatic mission to Lombard Italy and the court of Desiderius, indicate a level of political agency and autonomy previously withheld from her by scholars. Some historians credit Bertrada's support for her elder son Charlemagne over her younger son Carloman, and her diplomatic skills, for Charlemagne's early success. However, the existence of such favoritism is challenged by others in the historical community. Although her influence over Charlemagne may have diminished in time, she lived at his court, and, according to Einhard, their relationship was excellent. Despite Pope Stephen III’s strong urging against either Charlemagne or Carloman marrying with the Lombards in Italy in written correspondence, Bertrada facilitated an arrangement in which Charlemagne set aside his legal wife, Himiltrude, and marry Desiderata, a daughter of the Lombard king Desiderius. This insubordination to the wishes of the Pope indicate Bertrada wielded enough influence to reject his wishes. Nevertheless, Charlemagne soon divorced Desiderata. This divorce occurred shortly after the death of Carloman in 771, indicating a level of political pragmatism to the relationship. Einhard claims this was the only episode that ever strained relations between mother and son.

Papal Relationship The alliance between the franks and the papacy was a mutual gain relationship. The marriage between Bertrada and Pepin was sanctioned by the Pope in 749 after the birth of their first son Charlemagne. The Papal relationship continued into 751 when Pepin consoled Pope Stephen ll to attempt the later successful coup against the last Merovingian King Childeric lll. Pepin and Bertrada were later crowned in June of 754, and their sons Charlemagne and Carolman were both blessed by oils in the fashion of the old Testament. Pepin would later go on to support the Papacy in 754 and 756 by giving military aid to Pope Stephen ll against the Lombard invaders. After the successful military campaigns the Papal-Carolingian alliance was cemented by the Donation of Pepin which gifted newly acquired Frankish territory in Italy to the Pope. The Donation would extended the rule of the popes beyond the duchy of Rome and create the legal basis for the Papal States. Bertrada and Pepin relationship laid the foundation for the crowing of Charlemagne by Pope Leo 111 in 800.

=== Later life and death ===
Bertrada retired from the court after Carloman's death in 771 to live in Choisy-au-Bac, where Charlemagne had set aside a royal house for her. Choisy-au-Bac was favorable because of its history of being the home and burial place of several Merovingian kings. This further supports notions of a genealogical link between Bertrada and the previous-ruling Merovingian dynasty.

Bertrada died on 12 July 783 in Choisy-au-Bac. Charlemagne buried her in the Basilica of St Denis near Pepin.

== In literature ==
Bertrada inspired Adenes Le Roi to write the poem Li rouman de Berte aus grands piés in 1270. Adenes referred to her as "Bertha Broadfoot", the earliest known usage of that nickname. While it is possible that Bertrada could have a foot deformity caused by bunions or she could’ve been born with a clubfoot, there are no contemporary sources that mention any kind of foot deformity. The earliest mention of her ‘broadfoot’ is within Li rouman de Berte aus grands piés, a trouvere that is likely entirely fictitious.

Bertrada is also referred to as "Bertha Broadfoot" (Berthe au grand pied) in François Villon's 15th-century poem Ballade des dames du temps jadis.

Bertrada was adapted into the character Berthe for the Stephen Schwartz musical Pippin, first staged in 1972.

== Nickname ==
Bertrada's nickname "Bertha Broadfoot" dates back to the 13th century, when it was used in Adenes Le Roi's trouvère Li rouman de Berte aus grands piés. The exact reason that Bertrada was given this nickname is unclear. It is also possible but unlikely that Bertrada was born with a clubfoot, although Adenes does not mention this in his poem.

== Notes ==
Preceded by Clotilda	Queen of the Franks; 751–768	Succeeded by Desiderata and Gerberga
