= Prüm Abbey =

Benedictine abbey in Germany

Coordinates: 50°12′23″N 6°25′33″E

Princely Abbey of Prüm Fürstabtei Prüm
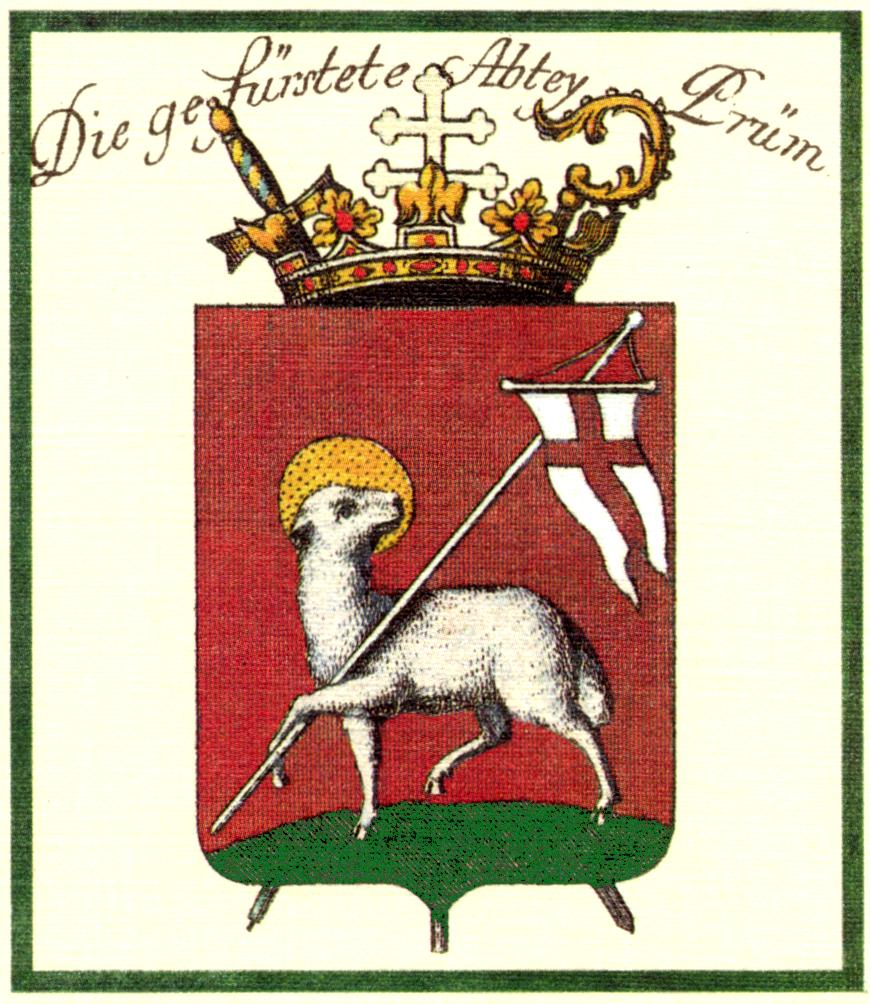
- Coat of arms

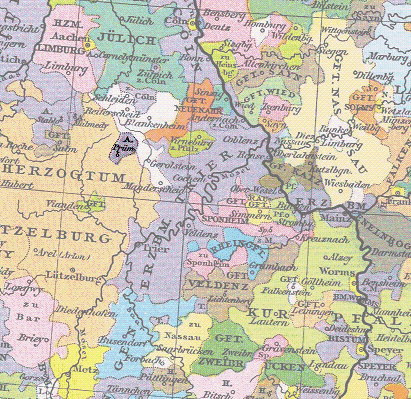
- The Princely Abbey of Prüm, shown within part of the Holy Roman Empire as at 1400.

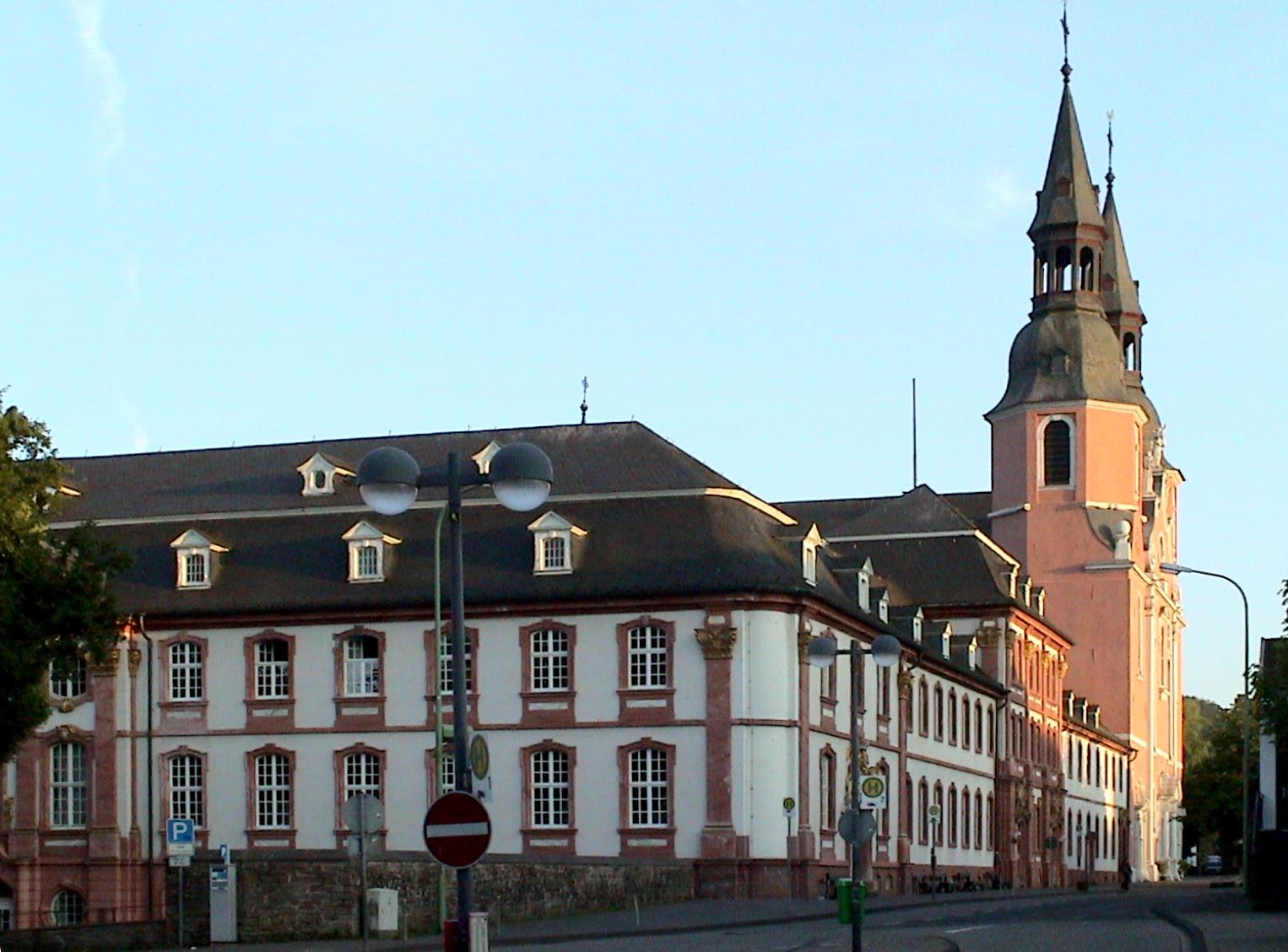
- Status: Princely Abbey
- Capital: Prüm Abbey
- Government: Principality
- Historical era: Middle Ages
  - First foundation: 721
  - Second foundation: 752
  - Raised to principality: 1222
  - Secularised by France: 1794
Preceded by	Succeeded by
Upper Lorraine	Electorate of Trier

Prüm Abbey is a former Benedictine abbey in Prüm, now in the diocese of Trier (Germany), founded by the Frankish widow Bertrada the elder and her son Charibert, Count of Laon, in 721. The first abbot was Angloardus.

The Abbey ruled over a vast hinterland comprising dozens of towns, villages and hamlets. Its abbot enjoyed the status of a prince (Fürst) of the Holy Roman Empire, and as such had seat and vote on the Ecclesiastical Bench of the College of ruling princes of the Imperial Diet. After 1574, the archbishops-electors of Trier became the "perpetual administrators" of Prüm Abbey which, while preserving its princely status, became, de facto, an adjunct of Trier.

== History ==
=== The Abbey's early period up to the 13th century ===
Bertrada of Prüm's granddaughter was Bertrada the Younger, wife of King Pepin the Short (751–68). Prüm became the favourite monastery of the Carolingian dynasty and received large endowments and privileges. Pepin rebuilt the monastery and bestowed great estates upon it by a deed of gift dated 13 August 762. The king brought monks from Meaux under Abbot Assuerus to the monastery.

The church, dedicated to the Saviour (Salvator), was not completed until the reign of Charlemagne, and was consecrated on 26 July 799 by Pope Leo III. Charlemagne, in January 806, gifted a property to the abbey and in April 807 he made a grant for the general support of the monastic community. Later emperors were liberal patrons of the abbey. Several of the Carolingians entered the religious life at Prüm; among these was Charlemagne's illegitimate son Pepin the Hunchback, who was exiled there after an abortive uprising and died there in 811, and Lothair I, who became a monk in 855. His grave was rediscovered in 1860; in 1874, the Emperor Wilhelm I erected a monument over it.

In 846 Bishop Hetto of Trier gifted by deed to Abbot Marcuardus the hamlet of Scindalasheim. In 882 and 892, the monastery was plundered and devastated by the Normans, but it soon recovered. The landed possessions were so large that the abbey developed into a principality.

At times during the eleventh and twelfth centuries, the monastery contained over three hundred monks. The period of its internal prosperity extends to the thirteenth century. The monks were energetic cultivators of the land. About 836, Abbot Marquard founded a new monastery at Münstereifel. In 1017, Abbot Urald founded at Prüm a collegiate foundation for twelve priests. In 1190, Abbot Gerhard founded a house for women of noble birth at Niederprüm. The monastery cared for the poor and sick. Learning was also cultivated. Among those who studied at the school of the monastery were Ado, later archbishop of Vienne (860–75). Wandelbert (813–70), was head of the school, and a distinguished poet. Abbot Regino of Prüm (893–99) made a name for himself as historian and codifier of canon law.

=== After the 13th century ===
In the 13th and 14th centuries, the monastery declined, partly from the oppression of its secular administrators, but more from internal decay. It reached such a pass that the monks divided the revenues among themselves and lived apart from one another.

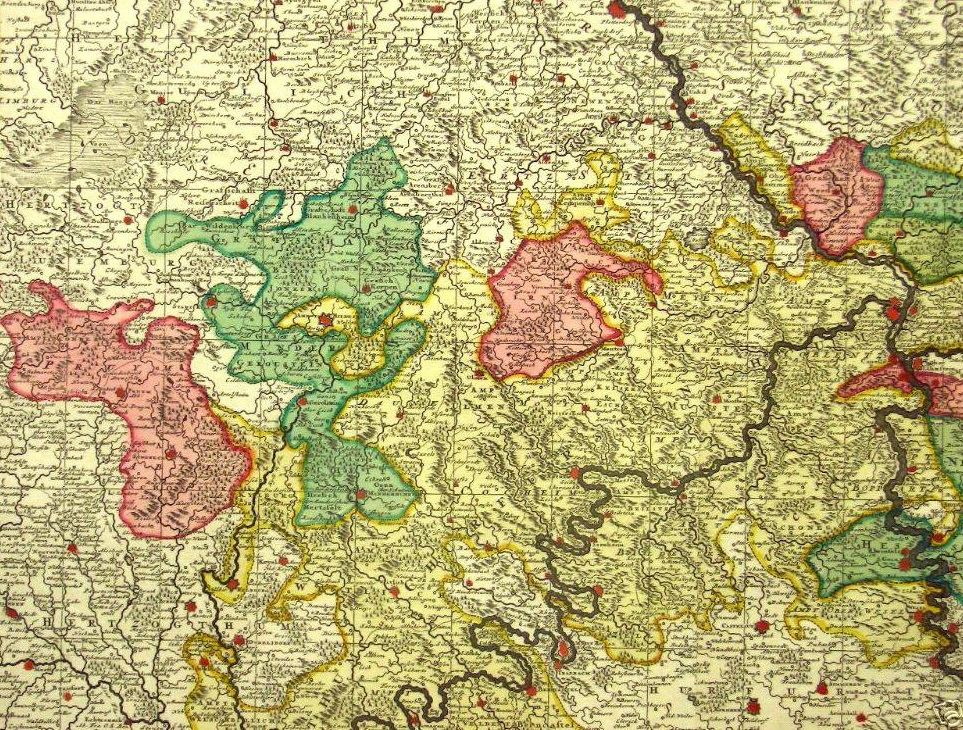
Prüm Abbey and region c. 1700

Consequently, the archbishops of Trier sought to incorporate the rich abbey and its extensive possessions into the archbishopric. In 1376, Emperor Charles IV gave his consent to this, as did Pope Boniface IX in 1379, but the pope's consent was recalled in 1398. Pope Sixtus IV in about 1473 also gave his approval to the incorporation. But the abbots refused to submit and even in 1511 carried on war against the archbishop, by then an elector. Finally, when the abbey was near ruin, Pope Gregory XIII issued the decree of incorporation, dated 24 August 1574, which was carried into effect in 1576 after the death of Abbot Christopher of Manderscheid.

After this, the archbishops-electors of Trier were "perpetual administrators" of the abbey. The abbey was now brought into order within and without, and once more flourished to such a degree that the two French Benedictine antiquarians Edmond Martène and Ursin Durand, who visited the monastery in 1718, stated in their Voyage littéraire that of all the monasteries in Germany, Prüm showed the best spirit, and study was zealously pursued. The monks made efforts even in the 18th century to shake off the control of Trier.

=== Secularization of the Abbey ===
In 1801, Prüm, occupied by French revolutionary troops since 1794, was formally annexed to France, secularized, and its estates sold; Napoleon gave its buildings to the city. In 1815, Prüm passed into the possession of Prussia as a part of the Rhine Province, and in the course of time became part of modern Germany, in the State of Rhineland-Palatinate.

The church, built in 1721 by the Elector Ludwig, is now a parish church. The remaining monastic buildings are now used for the secondary school named the "Regino-Gymnasium" after the Abbot Regino of Prüm.

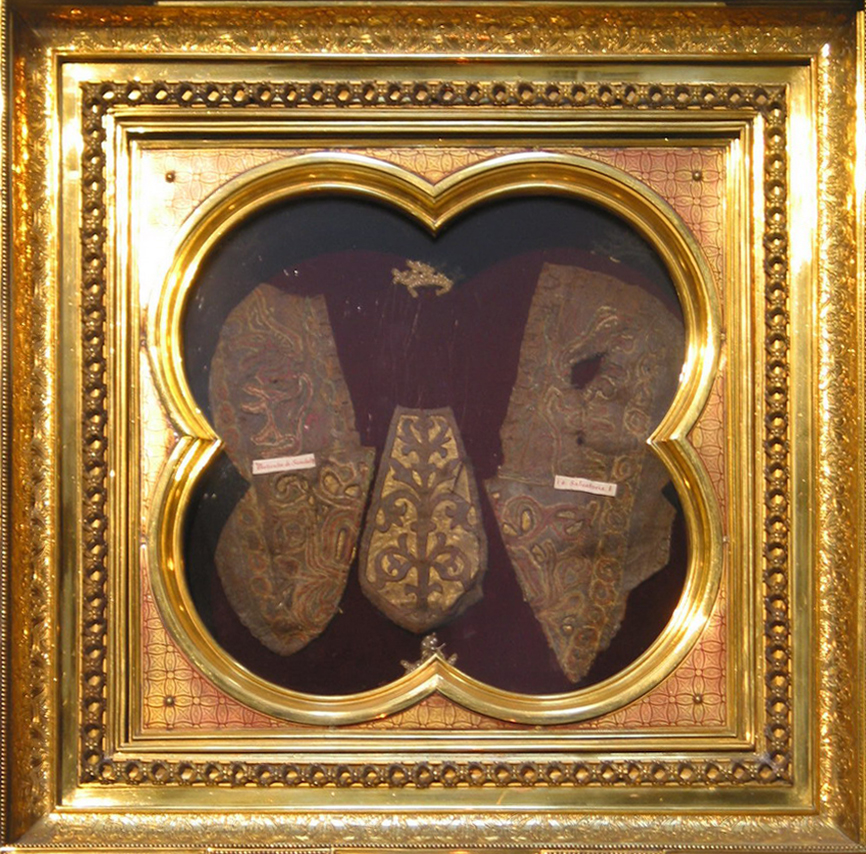
Sandals of Jesus Christ

=== Abbey relics ===
The Sandals of Jesus Christ are considered to be the most notable of the many relics of the church; they are mentioned by Pepin in the deed of 762. He is said to have received them from Rome as a gift of Pope Zachary or Pope Stephen II.

== Abbots ==
- Angloardus 720–762
- Assuerus 762–804
- Tankrad 804–829
- Markward of Bouillon 829–853
- Eigil 853–860
- Ansbald 860–886
- Farabert I 886–892
- Regino of Prüm 892–899
- Richar of Hennegau 899–921
- Ruotfried 921–935
- Farabert II of St Paul 935–947
- Ingelram of Limburg 947–976
- Eberhard of Salm 976–986
- Childerich 986–993
- Stephan of Saffenberg 993–1001
- Udo of Namur 1001–03
- Immo of Sponheim 1003–06
- Urold of Thaun (Daun) 1006–18
- Hilderad of Burgund 1018–26
- Ruprecht of Arberg 1026–68
- Rizo of Jülich 1068–77
- Wolfram of Bettingen 1077–1103
- Poppo of Beaumont 1103–19
- Lantfried of Hesse 1119–31
- Adalbero 1131–36
- Godfrey I of Hochstaden 1136–55
- Rother of Malberg 1155–70
- Robert I of Cleves 1170–74
- Gregor I of Geldern 1174–84
- Gerhard of Vianden 1184–1212
- Cæsarius of Milendonk 1212–16
- Kuno of Ahr 1216–20
- FrederickI of Fels 1220–45
- Godfrey II of Blankenheim 1245–74
- Walter of Blankenheim 1274–1322
- Henry I of Schönecken 1322–42
- Diether of Katzenelnbogen 1342–50
- John I Zandt of Merk 1350–54
- Dietrich of Kerpen 1354–97
- Frederick II of Schleiden 1397–1427
- Henry II of Are-Hirstorff 1427–33
- John II of Esche 1433–76
- Robert II of Virneburg 1476–1513
- Gregor II of Homburg 1513
- William of Manderscheid-Kayl 1513–46
- Christopher of Manderscheid-Kayl 1546–76
- From 1576 the Electors of Trier acted as Administrators of the abbey

== See also ==
- List of Merovingian monasteries
- Merovingian architecture
- Merovingian art

== Sources ==
- Bernhardt, John W. (1987). "Servitium Regis and Monastic Property in Early Medieval Germany". Viator Medieval & Renaissance Studies. 18: 53–88.
