= Battle of Autun (640s) =

7th-century Merovingian battle

The Battle of Autun was a pitched battle in 642 or 643, concluding a feud between Flaochad and Willebad, two magnates of the Merovingian kingdom of Burgundy. The battle is recounted in detail in the final chapter of the contemporary Chronicle of Fredegar and also in the biographies of saints Eligius of Noyon and Sigiramn. While Fredegar seems hostile to Willebad, the hagiographers are hostile to Flaochad. The anonymous author of Fredegar may have been an eyewitness.

== Rising tensions ==
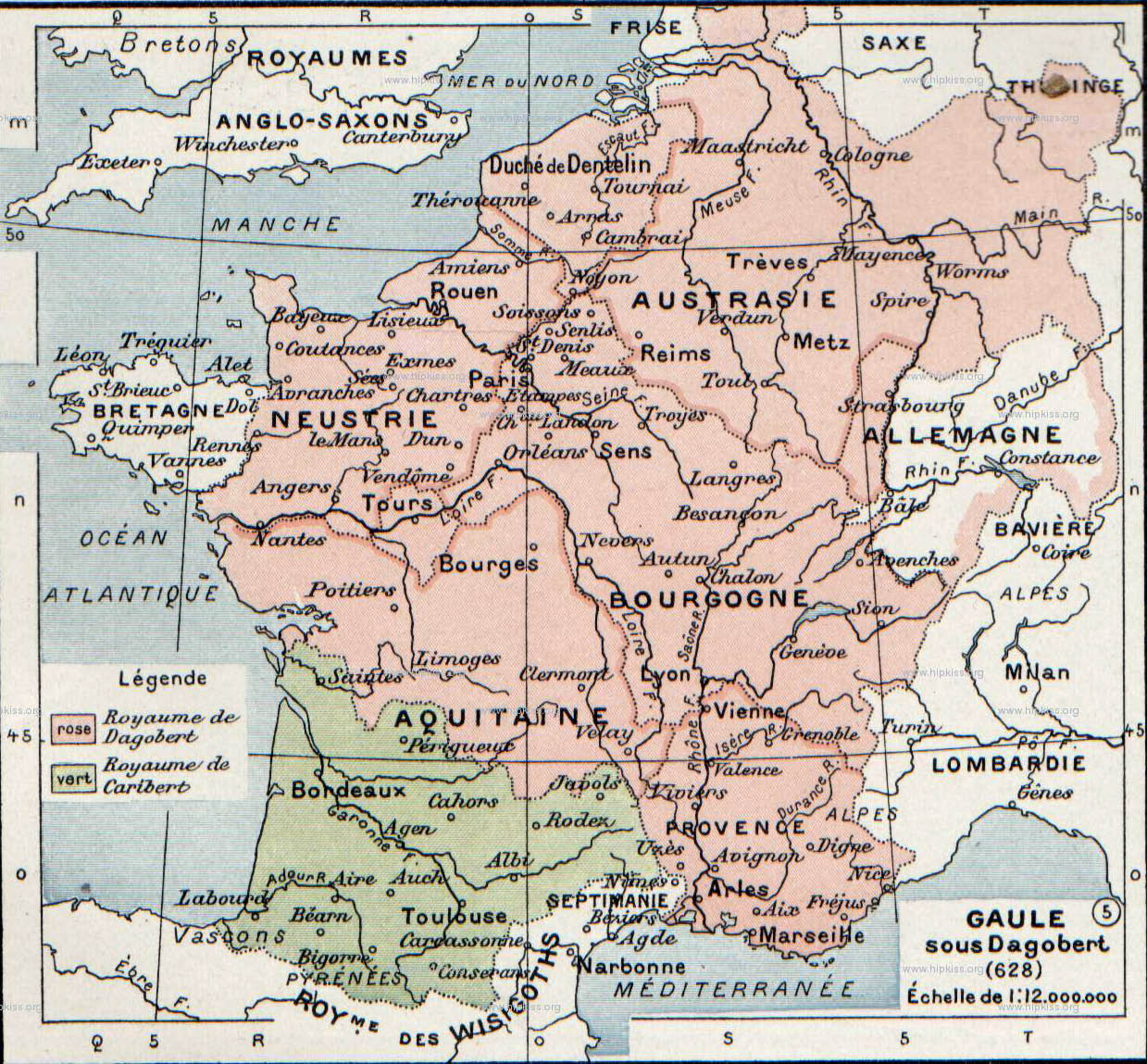
The Merovingian kingdoms in the mid-7th century

Shortly before her death, the queen regent Nantechildis appointed Flaochad, described by Fredegar as "of the race of the Franks" (genere Francorum), as mayor of the palace of Burgundy. This office had been vacant since 626 or 627, when the mayor Warnachar died and the Burgundian nobility opted not to replace him. According to Fredegar, it was on his first circuit of Burgundy that Flaochad remembered he had long hated Willebad, who held the rank of patrician, and began plotting to kill him. According to the Life of Sigiramn, Willebad was a former pupil of Flaochad. Fredegar claims that Willebad "had become very rich by seizing the properties of a great many people by one means or another" and, puffed up with pride on account of his rank and wealth, demeaned Flaochad.

In May 642 or 643, Flaochad convoked a placitum at Chalon, intending to seek a judgement against Willebad. When the latter arrived with his retinue, he realized the danger he was in and refused to enter the palace. Flaochad attempted to have Willebad killed, but his plan was foiled and he marched out to fight. Flaochad's brother, Amalbert, intervened successfully to prevent bloodshed. Willebad, however, took the mayor's brother hostage to cover his retreat from Chalon.

== Royal intervention and the battle at Autun ==
After the failed placitum, Flaochad went to Paris to ask the child-king Clovis II to intervene in person. The king summoned Willebad to appear before him in Autun. In September, Clovis and Flaochad, accompanied by a large group of Neustrians, arrived in Autun. Suspecting he would have to fight, Willebad collected a large army from his followers, both ecclesiastical and lay, before marching on Autun. According to Fredegar, "he assembled a large force from the limits of his patriciate, as well as all the bishops, nobles and warriors whom he could collect". The former may have been a part of the standing army that traditionally served under the Burgundian patrician, a general levy of whatever lands constituted the patriciate or the same scara that had served under Willebad against the Basques in 635. Willebad, however, refused to enter Autun, even at the king's urging.

Flaochad and his allies—the dukes Amalgar, Chramnelen and Wandelbert—with their followings marched out of Autun to meet Willebad in battle. The Neustrians under their mayor, Erchinoald, and the Burgundians who had given their support to Flaochad were reluctant to join. The actual battle probably involved only a small fraction of all the troops present in Autun. A Transjuran Frank named Berthar, a count of the palace to Clovis II, was the first to try to kill Willebad. He was seriously wounded, however, when he offered protection under his shield to an old friend, a Burgundian named Manaulf. The latter stabbed him, and Berthar was only saved at the last moment by his son Chaubedo, who charged Manaulf on horseback, killing him and his men with a lance. Willebad and many of his followers were killed in the battle. The Neustrians who had remained aloof plundered Willebad's camp, seizing a large number of horses. The account of Berthar, Manaulf and Chaubedo shows some fighting on foot and others on horse. The account of the plunder seems to show that many rode to battle but dismounted to fight.

== Capture of Chalon and death of Flaochad ==
The day after his victory, Flaochad entered Chalon-sur-Saône. The next day the "city burnt to the ground by some mischance of which I am ignorant", according to Fredegar. It may be that Chalon was the seat of Willebad's power and its occupation and (perhaps intentional) destruction were meant symbolically to cement Flaochad's victory.

According to the Life of Eligius, Flaochad fell ill seven days after the battle and soon died a miserable death, as the saint had predicted. Fredegar records that he died of a fever eleven days after the battle. It goes on to say that many saw in this divine judgement, "since time and again Flaochad and Willebad had sworn mutual friendship in places holy to the saints and in addition had both greedily oppressed and robbed people." A hoard of coins found near Buis in the 19th century has often been linked to the Battle of Autun, specifically to the plundering and the consequent scattering of treasure. The hoard contained mainly Burgundian issues.

The conflict that led to the battle has often been seen in ethnic terms, since Fredegar describes Flaochad as a Frank and Willebad as a Burgundian. It has also been seen as result of political mistakes at the top: the appointment of a mayor against the wishes of the Burgundians and the appointment of a Neustrian who was regarded as an outsider. Political change seems to have followed the battle. No further mayors of Burgundy seem to have been appointed and the patriciate too seems to have been suppressed.

== Bibliography ==
- Bachrach, Bernard S. (1972). Merovingian Military Organization, 481–751. University of Minnesota Press.
- Collins, Roger (2007). Die Fredegar-Chroniken. Hahnsche Buchhandlung.
- Fouracre, Paul (1986). "'Placita' and the settlement of disputes in later Merovingian Francia". In Wendy Davies; Paul Fouracre (eds.). The Settlement of Disputes in Early Medieval Europe. pp. 23–43.
- Fox, Yaniv (2015a). "Image of Kings Past: The Gibichung Legacy in Post-Conquest Burgundy". Francia. 42: 1–26.
- Fox, Yaniv (2015b). "New Honores for a Region Transformed: The Patriciate in Post-Roman Gaul". Revue belge de Philologie et d'Histoire. 93 (2): 249–286. doi:10.3406/rbph.2015.8835.
- France, John (2017). "The Military History of the Carolingian Period". In Kelly DeVries (ed.). Warfare in the Dark Ages. Routledge. pp. 321–339. Originally published in Revue belge d'histoire militaire 26 (1985): 81–99.
- Grierson, Philip; Blackburn, Mark (2007). Medieval European Coinage. Vol. 1: The Early Middle Ages (5th–10th Centuries). Cambridge University Press.
- Martindale, John R., ed. (1992). The Prosopography of the Later Roman Empire: Volume III, AD 527–641. Cambridge: Cambridge University Press. ISBN 0-521-20160-8.
- Reimitz, Helmut (2015). History, Frankish Identity and the Framing of Western Ethnicity, 550–850. Cambridge University Press.
- Wallace-Hadrill, J. M. (1959). "The Bloodfeud of the Franks". Bulletin of the John Rylands Library. 41 (2): 459–487. doi:10.7227/BJRL.41.2.10.
- Wallace-Hadrill, J. M., ed. (1960). The Fourth Book of the Chronicle of Fredegar with its Continuations. Thomas Nelson and Sons.
- Wood, Ian N. (1994). The Merovingian Kingdoms, 450–751. Longman.
