= Duke of Burgundy =

Title used by the rulers of the Duchy of Burgundy

- Creation date: 880
- Peerage: Peerage of France
- First holder: Richard the Justiciar
- Last holder: Charles the Bold (fief); Louis of France (courtesy title)
- Status: Extinct
- Extinction date: 5 January 1477 (fief); 22 March 1761 (courtesy title)
- Seats: Château de Germolles; Hôtel de Bourgogne; Palace of the Dukes of Burgundy

Duke of Burgundy (French: duc de Bourgogne) was a title used by the rulers of the Duchy of Burgundy, from its establishment in 843 to its annexation by the French crown in 1477, and later by members of the House of Habsburg, including Holy Roman Emperors and kings of Spain, who claimed Burgundy proper and ruled the Burgundian Netherlands.

The Duchy of Burgundy was a small portion of the traditional lands of the Burgundians west of the river Saône which, in 843, was allotted to Charles the Bald's kingdom of the West Franks. Under the Ancien Régime, the duke of Burgundy was the premier lay peer of the Kingdom of France. Beginning with Robert II of France (r. 996–1031), the title was held by the Capetians, the French royal family. In 1032 King Henry I of France granted the duchy to his younger brother, Robert, who founded the House of Burgundy. When the senior line of the House of Burgundy became extinct in 1361, the title was inherited by King John II of France through proximity of blood. John granted the duchy to his younger son, Philip the Bold, in 1363. The Valois dukes gradually came to rule over a vast complex of territories known as the Burgundian State, and became dangerous rivals to the senior French royal line of the House of Valois.

When the male line of the Valois dukes of Burgundy became extinct in 1477, the Duchy of Burgundy was confiscated by Louis XI of France. The title "duke of Burgundy" passed to Habsburg monarchs after Mary of Burgundy married Maximilian I of Austria in 1477. The Habsburgs used this connection to claim Burgundy proper and to rule their Burgundian inheritance until the Napoleonic era. The title was subsequently revived for several younger sons of the House of Bourbon and since 1975, branches of it have used "duke of Burgundy" as a revived courtesy title.

== List of dukes of Burgundy ==
=== Informal Dukes/Patricians of Burgundy (Mid 6th Century-880) ===
Before the Bosonid dynasty took control of Burgundy, many other nobles were informally called Dukes of Burgundy, or rulers around Burgundy.

This is an incomplete list of the Pre-Hereditary Dukes of Burgundy.

- Amalo (Mid 6th Century–589)
- Nordebert (???–697)
- Drogo (697–708) (also Duke of Champagne)
- Grimoald (708–714) (also Duke of Champagne)
- Warin (???–845/56) (also Duke of Provence)

=== Bosonid dynasty (880–956) ===
The first margrave (marchio), later duke (dux), of Burgundy was Richard of the House of Ardennes, whose duchy was created from the merging of several regional counties of the kingdom of Provence which had belonged to his brother Boso. Richard was the son of Eccard of Macon and Richildis of Arles, Boso the son of Bivin of Gorze and Richildis of Arles.

His descendants and their relatives by marriage ruled the duchy until its annexation over a century later by the French crown, their suzerain.

- Richard the Justiciar (880–921)
- Rudolph (921–923), then King of the Franks
- Hugh the Black (923–952)
- Gilbert (952–956)

=== Robertian dynasty (956–1002) ===
- Otto (956–965)
- Eudes Henry the Great (965–1002)

=== House of Ivrea (1002–1004) ===
- Otto William (1002–1004)

=== House of Capet (1004–1032) ===
In 1004, Burgundy was annexed by the king, of the House of Capet. Otto William continued to rule what would come to be called the Free County of Burgundy. His descendants formed another House of Ivrea.

- Robert (1004–1016) (also king of the Franks as Robert II)
- Henry (1016–1032) (also king of the Franks as Henry I)

=== House of Burgundy (1032–1361) ===
Robert, son of Robert II of France, received the Duchy as a peace settlement, having disputed the succession to the throne of France with his brother Henry.

Picture	Name	Birth	Became Duke	Ruled until	Death	Notes	Arms
	Robert I the Old (Robert I^{er} le Vieux)	1011	1032	21 March 1076		Younger son of Robert II of France.	
	Hugh I (Hugues I^{er})	1057	21 March 1076	1079	29 August 1093	Eldest son of Henry of Burgundy, grandson of Robert I. Abdicated in favour of his younger brother, Odo.	
	Odo I Borel the Red (Eudes I^{er} Borel le Roux)	1058	1079	23 March 1103		Younger brother of Hugh I.	
	Hugh II (Hugues II)	1084	23 March 1103	1143		Son of Odo I	
	Odo II (Eudes II)	1118	1143	27 June/27 September 1162		Eldest son of Hugh II	
	Hugh III (Hugues III)	1142	27 June/27 September 1162	25 August 1192		Eldest son of Odo II	
	Odo III (Eudes III)	1166	25 August 1192	6 July 1218		Eldest son of Hugh III	
	Hugh IV (Hugues IV)	9 March 1213	6 July 1218	27 October 1272		Eldest son of Odo III	
	Robert II (Robert II)	1248	27 October 1271	21 March 1306		Eldest surviving son of Hugh IV.	
	Hugh V (Hugues V)	1282	21 March 1306	9 May 1315		Eldest son of Robert II.	
	Odo IV (Eudes IV)	1295	9 May 1315	3 April 1350		Younger brother of Hugh V.	
	Philip I of Rouvres (Philippe I^{er} de Rouvres)	1346	3 April 1350	21 November 1361		Grandson of Odo IV.	

=== House of Valois-Burgundy (1361–1482) ===
On 28 December 1361 John II of France, the second Valois king, successfully claimed the duchy after the death of Philip, the last Capet duke. The duchy did not merge into the royal domain; it remained a distinct feudal entity, with the Burgundian estates firmly opposing annexation.

In January 1362 he had appointed Henri of Bar, Lord of Pierrefort, as the initial governor, but as early as January 25, 1362, John appointed John of Melun, Count of Tancarville as governor of Burgundy.

John then passed the duchy to his youngest son Philip as an apanage in 1363.

Picture	Name	Birth	Became Duke	Ruled until	Death	Notes	Arms
	John II the Good (Jean II le Bon)	26 April 1319	28 December 1361	6 September 1363	8 April 1364	Youngest son of Philip VI The Fortunate	
	Philip II the Bold (Philippe II le Hardi)	15 January 1342	6 September 1363	27 April 1404		Youngest son of John the Good	
	John I the Fearless (Jean I sans Peur)	28 May 1371	27 April 1404	10 September 1419		Eldest son of Philip the Bold	
	Philip III the Good (Philippe III le Bon)	31 July 1396	10 September 1419	15 June 1467		Eldest son of John the Fearless	
	Charles I the Bold (Charles I le Téméraire)	21 November 1433	15 June 1467	5 January 1477		Eldest son of Philip the Good	
	Mary the Rich	13 February 1457	5 January 1477	27 March 1482		Only daughter of Charles the Bold	

=== Family tree ===
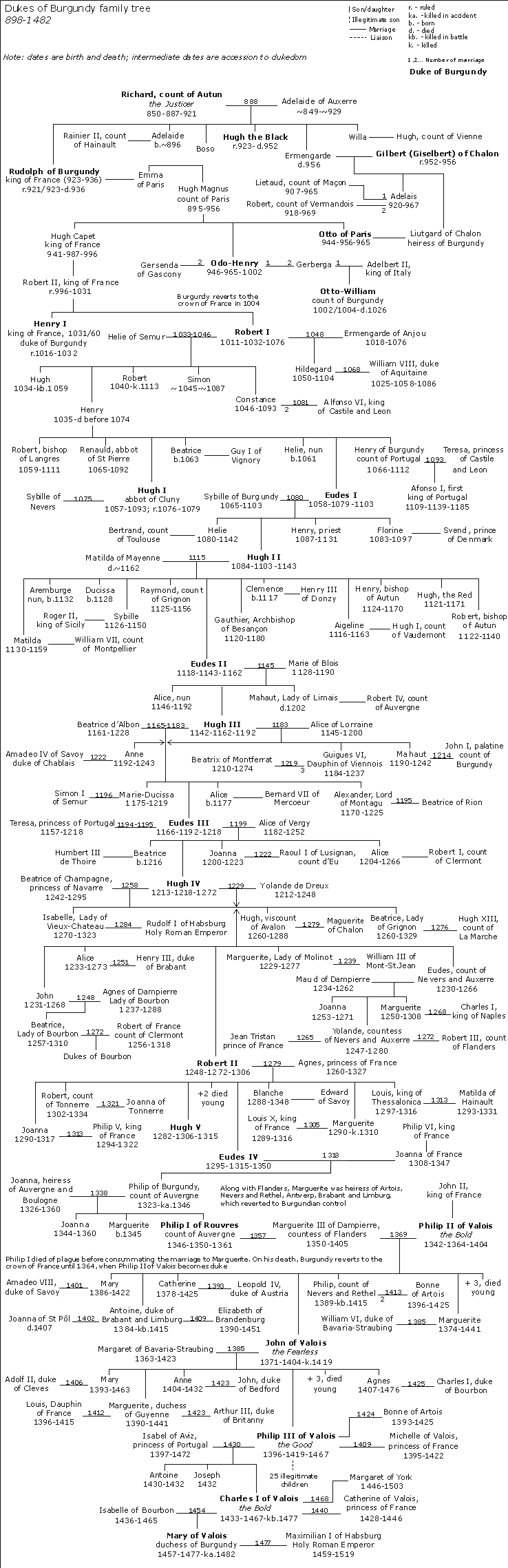

=== House of Habsburg (1482–1700) ===
In 1477, the territory of the Duchy of Burgundy was annexed by France. In the same year, Mary married Maximilian, Archduke of Austria, giving the Habsburgs control of the remainder of the Burgundian Inheritance.

Although the territory of the Duchy of Burgundy itself remained in the hands of France, the Habsburgs remained in control of the title of Duke of Burgundy and the other parts of the Burgundian inheritance, notably the Low Countries and the Free County of Burgundy in the Holy Roman Empire as well as the County of Charolais in France. They often used the term Burgundy to refer to it (e.g. in the name of the Imperial Circle it was grouped into), until the late 18th century, when the Austrian Netherlands were lost to the French Republic. The Habsburgs also continued to claim Burgundy proper until the Treaty of Cambrai in 1529, when they surrendered their claim in exchange for French recognition of Imperial sovereignty over Flanders and Artois.

- Maximilian I (1477–1482 with his wife; regent 1482–1494)
- Philip IV the Handsome (German: Philipp der Schöne; French: Philippe le Beau), titular Duke of Burgundy as Philip IV (1482–1506)
- Charles II (Holy Roman Emperor Charles V and King Charles I of Spain) 1506–1555

Picture	Name	Birth	Became Duke	Ruled until	Death	Notes	Arms
	Philip IV the Handsome (Philippe IV le Beau)	22 July 1478	22 February 1482	25 September 1506		Eldest son of Duchess Mary by Maximilian of Habsburg	
	Charles II	24 February 1500	25 September 1506	16 January 1556	21 September 1558	Eldest son of Philip the Handsome. Also Charles I of Aragon and Castile, and Holy Roman Emperor Charles V	

- Philip V (King Philip II of Spain) 1556–1598
- Isabella I (infanta Isabella Clara of Spain) and Albert I (Albert VII of Austria) (jure uxoris) 1598–1621
- Philip VI (King Philip IV of Spain) 1621–1665
- Charles III (King Charles II of Spain) 1665–1700

=== House of Bourbon, claimants of the title (1682–1761) ===
- Louis, Duke of Burgundy (1682–1712)
- Louis, Duke of Burgundy (1751–1761)

=== House of Habsburg (1713–1918) ===
- Charles IV (Emperor Charles VI) 1713–1740
- Maria Theresa 1740–1780
- Joseph (Emperor Joseph II) 1780–1790
- Leopold (Emperor Leopold II) 1790–1792
- Francis (Emperor Francis II) 1792–1795/1835
- Ferdinand (Emperor Ferdinand I) (1835–1848 titular only)
- Franz Joseph (Emperor Franz Joseph I) (1848–1916 titular only)
- Charles V (Emperor Charles I) (1916–1918 titular only later renounced)

=== House of Bourbon, revived title (1975–present) ===
- King Juan Carlos I of Spain (1975–2014)
- King Felipe VI of Spain (2014–present) – the title is one of the titles of the Spanish Crown
- Prince Sixtus Henry of Bourbon-Parma (Carlist claimant to the throne of Spain as "Enrique V", 1977–present) – the title is one of the titles of the Spanish Crown. He is considered the legitimate successor to the Catholic Monarchy of the Spains as heir to Infante Carlos María Isidro ("Carlos V").
- Louis, Dauphin of France (2010–present) – the title is used by eldest son of the Legitimist claimant to the French throne, Prince Louis, Duke of Anjou ("Louis XX").

== Dukes of Burgundy in fiction ==
- A Duke of Burgundy appears in the 13th-century Old French short romance Châtelaine de Vergy. His niece, the titular Châtelaine of Vergy, is the secret lover of an anonymous knight in her uncle's employ.
- In William Shakespeare's King Lear, which is set in no particular century, the Duke of Burgundy is a suitor to Lear's youngest daughter Cordelia. He renounces his request when he learns Cordelia has been disinherited.

== See also ==
- Duchess of Burgundy
- Burgundian State
- Kingdom of Burgundy
- King of Burgundy
- Duchy of Burgundy
- County of Burgundy
- Count of Burgundy
- Kingdom of Burgundy-Arles
