= Arthur Engel =

Arthur Engel may refer to:

- Arthur B. Engel (1914–1992), rear admiral in US Coast Guard
- Arthur Engel (mathematician) (born 1928), German mathematics teacher, educationalist and author
- Arthur Engel (numismatist) (1855–1935), French archaeologist and numismatist

== See also ==
- Arthur "Arkie" Engle (born 1965), American tennis player
