= Buis hoard =

Treasure hoard found in France

The Buis hoard was a hoard of Merovingian gold coins found in a vegetable patch at Buis (a hamlet in Chissey-en-Morvan) around 1855. There were about 300 to 400 coins in the hoard when local antiquary Anatole de Charmasse saw them in 1873, identified 55 types, took down legends and drew sketches. They have since been dispersed. Most recently, Jean Lafaurie has identified 76 coins from the hoard: 75 Merovingian tremisses and one Arab-Byzantine dīnār from Damascus. Eleven of the coins came from the mint of Chalon-sur-Saône and the latest datable Merovingian issue was struck in the name of Chlothar II at Marseille between 612 and 629. Pierre Le Gentilhomme, who first published the find in 1938, concluded that it was most likely deposited in the 640s, based on the sequence of moneyers from Chalon. It may have been buried in connection with the battle of Autun and the death of Willibad in September 642 or 643, since according to the Chronicle of Fredegar this was followed by much unrest and plundering.

The Arab-Byzantine dīnār first appeared on the market in 1862. According to Henri Lavoix's catalogue of 1887, it was found with two Merovingian coins. It portrays the emperors Heraclius, Constantine III and Heraclonas on the obverse and bears the shahāda on the reverse. If dated to shortly before 693, when a new coinage was introduced by the Caliph ʿAbd al-Malik ibn Marwān, it is inconsistent with the rest of the Buis hoard. Lafaurie suggested the very early date of 636–641, contemporary with the emperors depicted. Clive Foss suggests that the dīnār, which bears no Christian symbol, is among the issues of the Caliph Muʿāwiya I that were rejected as tribute by the Emperor Constans II in 659. While it was certainly found not far from Buis, Philip Grierson argued that it could not have belonged to the Buis hoard. Michael McCormick also regards it as a stray find. It is today the "only Arab-Byzantine gold coin to have been found outside the Levant".

The tremisses of the hoard are mostly from the kingdom of Burgundy. The representation of mints along the Rhône, Saône and Meuse rivers reflects Buis's place along the trade route connecting the Mediterranean and the Rhine through eastern Francia. If the dīnār can be attached to the hoard, it would show the link of this route with Syria.

== Works cited ==
- Foss, Clive (2002). "A Syrian Coinage of Mu'awiya?". Revue Numismatique (158): 353–365.
- Foss, Clive (2015). "Coins of Two Realms". Aramco World. 66 (3): 20–23.
- Grierson, Philip; Blackburn, Mark (2007). Medieval European Coinage. Vol. 1: The Early Middle Ages (5th–10th Centuries). Cambridge University Press.
- Lafaurie, Jean (1977). "Nouvelles recherches sur le trésor de Chissey-en-Morvan (Saône-et-Loire), lieu dit Buis". Bulletin de la Société française de numismatique. 32: 211–216.
- McCormick, Michael (2001). Origins of the European Economy: Communications and Commerce, AD 300–900. Cambridge University Press.
- Morrisson, Cécile (2015). "Odd One Out? The Arab-Byzantine Dinar in the Merovingian Hoard from Buis (Chissey-en-Morvan)" (PDF). In Tuukka Talvio; Magnus Wijk (eds.). Myntstudier: festskrift till Kenneth Jonsson. Svenske Numismatiska Föreningen. pp. 135–138.
- Young, Bailey K. (2018). "Buis Hoard". In Nicholson, Oliver (ed.). The Oxford Dictionary of Late Antiquity, Volume 1: A–I. Oxford: Oxford University Press. p. 270. ISBN 978-0-19-881624-9.
