= Amalgar =

Burgundian duke

Amalgar, also Amalgarius (c. 590 – 643), was a Burgundian duke from the area around Dijon. He was also the proprietor of multiple monasteries, and was a progenitor of the Etichonid clan, from which the Habsburgs originate.

== Life ==
Amalgar's family belonged to the Burgundian people, as the formation of his personal name from the East Germanic Amal tribe suggests, and came to the region of the Saône plain as part of the expansion of Burgundian rule under King Gundobad.

Because of the Amal tribe, which rarely occurs among the Burgundian dukes, medievalists suspect that Amalgar was the grandson of the Duke Amalo, who is named in volume 9 of the Decem libri historiarum by Gregory of Tours.

The first mention of Amalgar as duke can be found in the chronicle of Fredegar for the year 629, but research generally assumes that he was already awarded the ducal dignity under the reign of Chlotar II.

After Chlotar's death, King Dagobert I took control of the Frankish Empire and passed over his half-brother Charibert II, who was described as simple-minded in the usual division of the estate. As Fredegar reports, under pressure from Neustrian nobles around Charibert's uncle Brodulf, the king was forced to give his half-brother the sub-kingdom in Aquitaine. In order to prevent the enforcement of Neustrian particular interests in the Frankish Empire in the future, Dagobert decided to have his influential uncle eliminated. In 630 Brodulf, who was on his way to Aquitaine, was murdered jointly by Amalgar, the Dux Arnebert and the Patricius Willibad at the instigation of the Frankish king during a stay in Saint-Jean-de-Losne in Burgundy.

After this act, Amalgar was one of the closest Burgundian confidants of Dagobert I and was entrusted with important tasks by the king. In 631 he led a Frankish army to the Visigoths on the Iberian Peninsula to support the Sisenand uprising against King Suinthila. In 637 Amalgar was appointed head of the Burgundian army, which was called up by Dagobert I to suppress a Basque revolt.

After the death of Dagobert I, Amalgar played a central role in the inner-Burgundian power struggle for the underage King Clovis II. He supported a Burgundian faction fighting against that of Willibad, who had previously aided him in the murder of Brodulf. At the gates of Autun there was a decisive battle in September 642 in the dispute for power in the Frankish part of Burgundy, which came to an end with the death of Willibad.

== Legacy ==
Amalgar was married to Aquilina, the daughter of Waldelenus, a duke from Upper Burgundy. With this connection, the two most powerful families of Burgundy united - in particular the side of the Waldelenus rose over the course of the following two centuries as a clan of the Waltriche to one of the most influential families in the Frankish Empire.

From the marriage came the two sons: Adalrich, who succeeded his father as duke, and Waldelenus, who was taught in the Luxeuil abbey of Columbanus and then worked as abbot of the family monastery of Saint-Pierre, as well as the daughter Adalsind, who became an abbess in Brégille.

The grandson of Amalgar, Adalrich's son Eticho, was a duke in Alsace, father of St. Odilia and ancestor of the noble family, the Etichonids, to which later dynasties, for example the Habsburgs, trace their origin.

Like many Christians at the time, Amalgar was convinced that public penance would allow all sins to be forgiven. Therefore, he founded the Saint-Pierre monastery immediately after Brodulf's murder. Later on, he would also found the Bregille abbey. Both would be richly endowed with lands around Burgundy.
