= Willibad =

Willibad, also spelled Willebad or Willihad (died 642), was the Patrician of Burgundian Provence in the first half of the seventh century. Willibad may have been a Frank or perhaps a Burgundian, one of the last representatives of the native nobility which had been subdued by the Franks in 534. He died in the Battle of Autun in 642/643.

The centre of Willibad's power was Lyon, Vienne, and Valence. Willibad's influence in Burgundy, though immense, was not absolute. Among his enemies were the dukes Chramnelenus of Besançon, Wandalbert of Chambly, and Amalgar of Dijon. The clan of Waldelenus and the supporters of Columban also opposed him.

Willibad had a long-running feud with Flaochad when the latter was appointed mayor of the palace of Burgundy in 639. Flaochad immediately set out to destroy Willibad. At a court at Chalon, Flaochad tried to assassinate him, but, failing, instead left his palace to challenge him to a duel, which Flaochad's brother Amalbert prevented from happening.

Finally, Clovis II, conspiring with Flaochad, held a court near Autun and summoned Willibad. The two Burgundian magnates met in battle and Willibad was killed. Flaochad only survived him eleven days. According to Fredegar, who seems to have been personally interested in this event, the last which he recorded, both were the victims of divine judgement, for they had sworn friendship in holy places and had subsequently despoiled land to enrich themselves and made war on each other. After the battle at Autun, Willibad's tent had been pillaged and his wealth dispersed. A hoard of coins found at Buis in Saône-et-Loire have been hypothesized to be from his treasure.

== Notes ==
=== Sources ===
- Geary, Patrick J. (1988). Before France and Germany. Oxford University Press.
- Le Gentilhomme, Pierre (1940). Mélange de Numismatique Mérovingienne.
- Lewis, Archibald R. (1976). "The Dukes in the Regnum Francorum, A.D. 550–751". Speculum. 51 (3): 381–410. doi:10.2307/2851704. JSTOR 2851704.
- Wallace-Hadrill, J. M. (1962). The Long-Haired Kings and other Studies in Frankish History. London: Butler & Tanner.
