= Waldalenus =

6th-7th c Frankish Duke in Burgundy

Waldalenus, or Wandalenus (late 6th – early 7th century), dux in the region between the Alps and the Jura, in the Frankish Kingdom of Burgundy, was a Frankish magnate who served as mayor of the Austrasian palace at Metz from 581, during the minority of Childebert II.

One of his seats of government (palatium) as patricius of Burgundy was at Arlay on the "Salt Road", noted in 597. There his son, Donatus of Luxeuil, would found the Abbey of Saint-Vincent, later destroyed by Otto II of Burgundy.

He was a well-known patron of Columbanus at Luxeuil Abbey (founded around 585–90), where he dedicated one son to monastic life, and thus provided early support for Hiberno-Frankish monasticism in Western Europe: "This family's connections stretched into Provence and would prove highly influential in seventh-century Frankish politics," Marilyn Dunn notes. Both Eustasius and Waldebert, kinsmen of Waldalenus, succeeded Columbanus as second and third abbots of Luxeuil. The extended family of Waldelenus controlled the Alpine passes approached from Briançon, those of Susa (the Col de Montgenèvre), Embrun, and Gap. Abbo, Patrician of Provence and rector of Maurienne and Susa, the opponent of Maurontus, came from the family of Waldelenus.

His opponents in Burgundy represented the influence of Willibad (died 642), the patrician of Burgundian Provence. Willibad may not have been a Frank but perhaps a Burgundian, one of the last representatives of the native nobility. The centre of Willibad's power was Lyon, Vienne and Valence. Willibad continued to be confronted by the supporters of Columbanus, Waldalenus' son, Chramnelenus of Besançon, Chramnelenus' brother-in-law Amalgar of Dijon and Wandalbert of Chambly.

Waldalenus was married to Flavia—noble in birth and bearing, according to the chronicler of Columbanus and his foundations, Jonas of Bobbio—but the couple were barren, until they beseeched Columbanus to intercede for a miraculous pregnancy. Columbanus required that the first-born be dedicated to the church, and consequently Donatus, christened by Columbanus himself as the "gift", was raised and educated at Luxeuil and was made Bishop of Besançon. The second son was Chramnelenus, and there were two daughters that the Merovingian chronicler did not think to name.

Flavia outlived her husband and founded a convent of nuns at the dynasty's headquarters, Besançon, where her son Donatus was bishop.

A later Waldalenus of this house, Abbot of Bèze, came to be venerated as a saint; is noticed in a diplomatic document of September 677.

He was an ancestor of Charles I And IV
