= Novalesa Abbey =

Monastery in Novalesa, Italy

Coordinates: 45°10′47″N 7°00′30″E

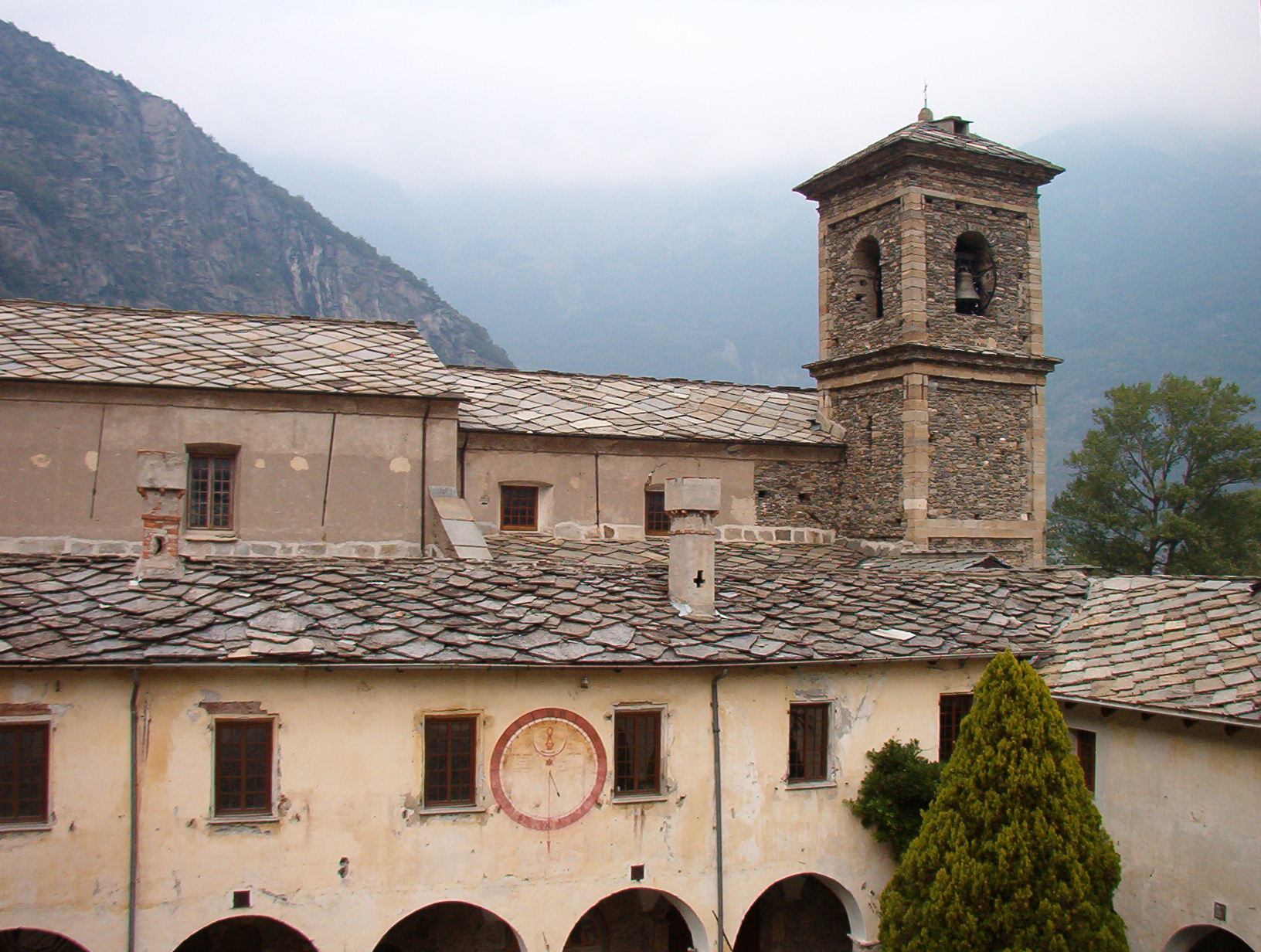
Novalesa Abbey.

Novalesa Abbey (Italian: Abbazia di Novalesa) is a Benedictine monastery in the Metropolitan City of Turin, Piedmont, Italy. It was founded in 726, and dedicated to Saint Peter and Saint Andrew.

Novalesa is in the Val di Susa, on the route to the Mont Cenis Pass, and on the former Via Francigena, a major pilgrimage road. The abbey is still in operation as an active Benedictine monastery.

== History ==
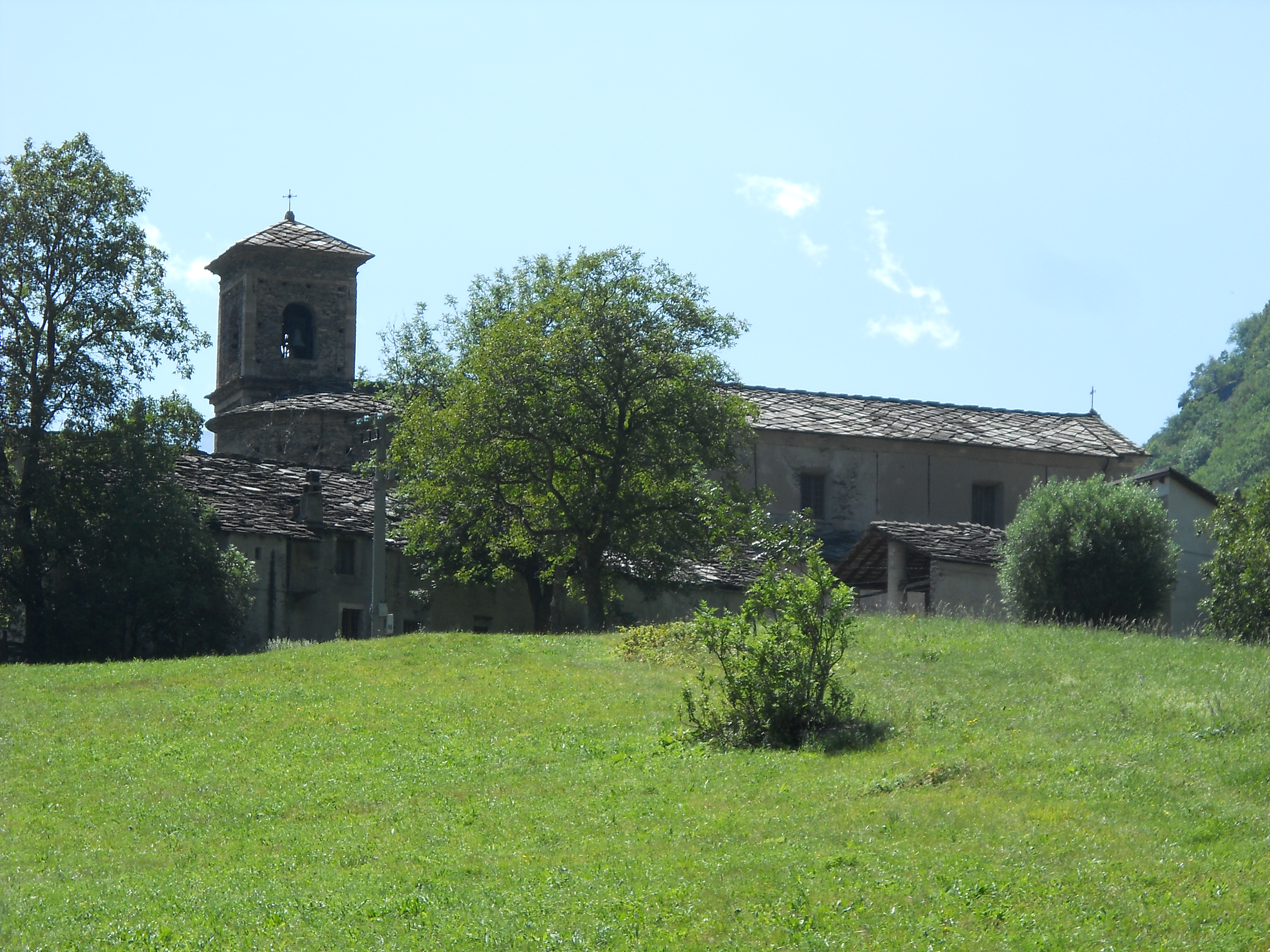
Abbey of Novalesa

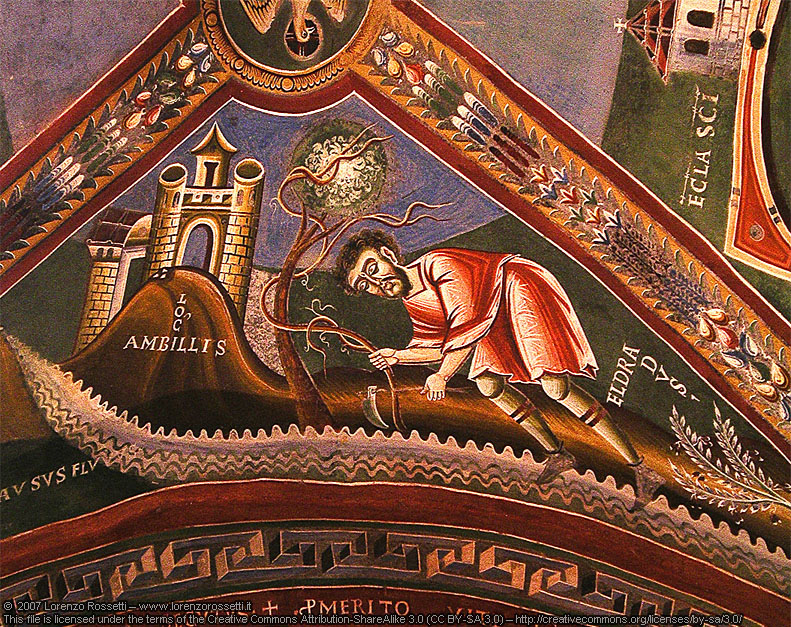
Life of Saint Eldrad, abbot. Medieval fresco in Eldrad's chapel.

The abbey was officially founded in a position commanding the Mont Cenis Pass on 30 January 726, by a Frankish lord Abbo of Provence, whose parchment deed of gift is still preserved in the State Archives of Turin. The founding monks, Benedictines, are thought to have come from the Grenoble region. It became an important monastery with Charlemagne, who stayed there. The abbey enriched its possessions through donations and privileges from the Frankish rulers Pepin the Short, Charlemagne and Louis the Pious until its possessions reached the western Ligurian mainland. In 817, it adopted the Benedictine rule.

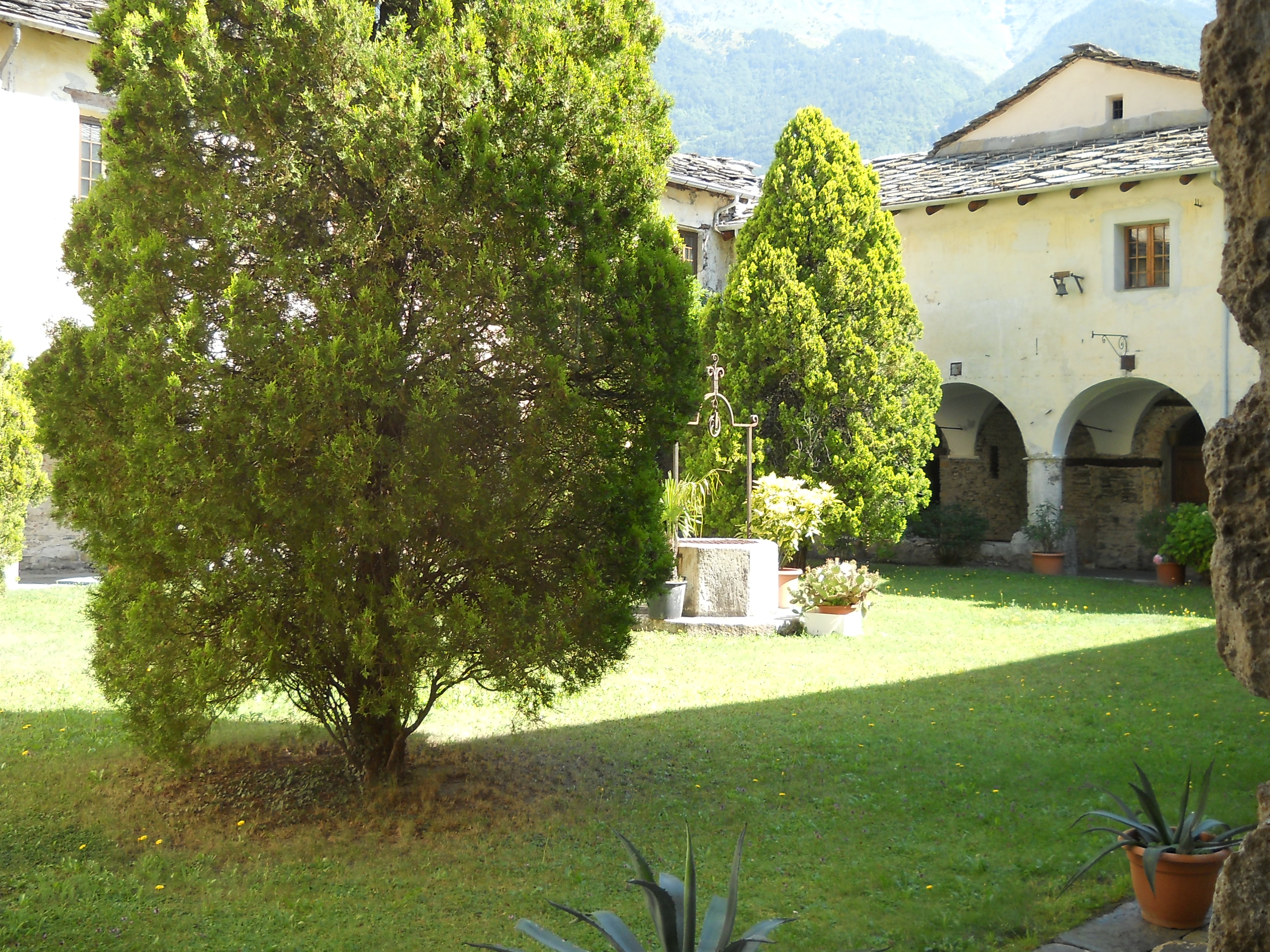
Cloister of the Abbey

The first phase of the abbey's history, abbot Eldrado's era, came to an end when it was destroyed by Saracen raiders in 906. Most monks moved to Turin, while others moved to Lomellina (in southern Lombardy) where they founded the monastery of Breme.

The abbey was rebuilt in the early 11th century by Gezo, abbot of Breme according to the Chronicon Novaliciense. In 1646 the Benedictines were replaced by Cistercian monks, who remained here until 1796, when they were expelled by the Piedmontese provisional government. A third refoundation occurred after the monks of a hospital established by Napoleon at the Mont Cenis (1802) moved back to Novalesa after the emperor's fall. However, they were again expelled in 1855 and the abbey's building was auctioned under the laws of expropriation of the Piedmontese government. The complex was acquired by the province of Turin in 1972 and was revived in 1973 with the return of the Benedictine monks, who still live there.

== Description ==
The complex of Novalesa includes a monastic building proper, and the abbey church.

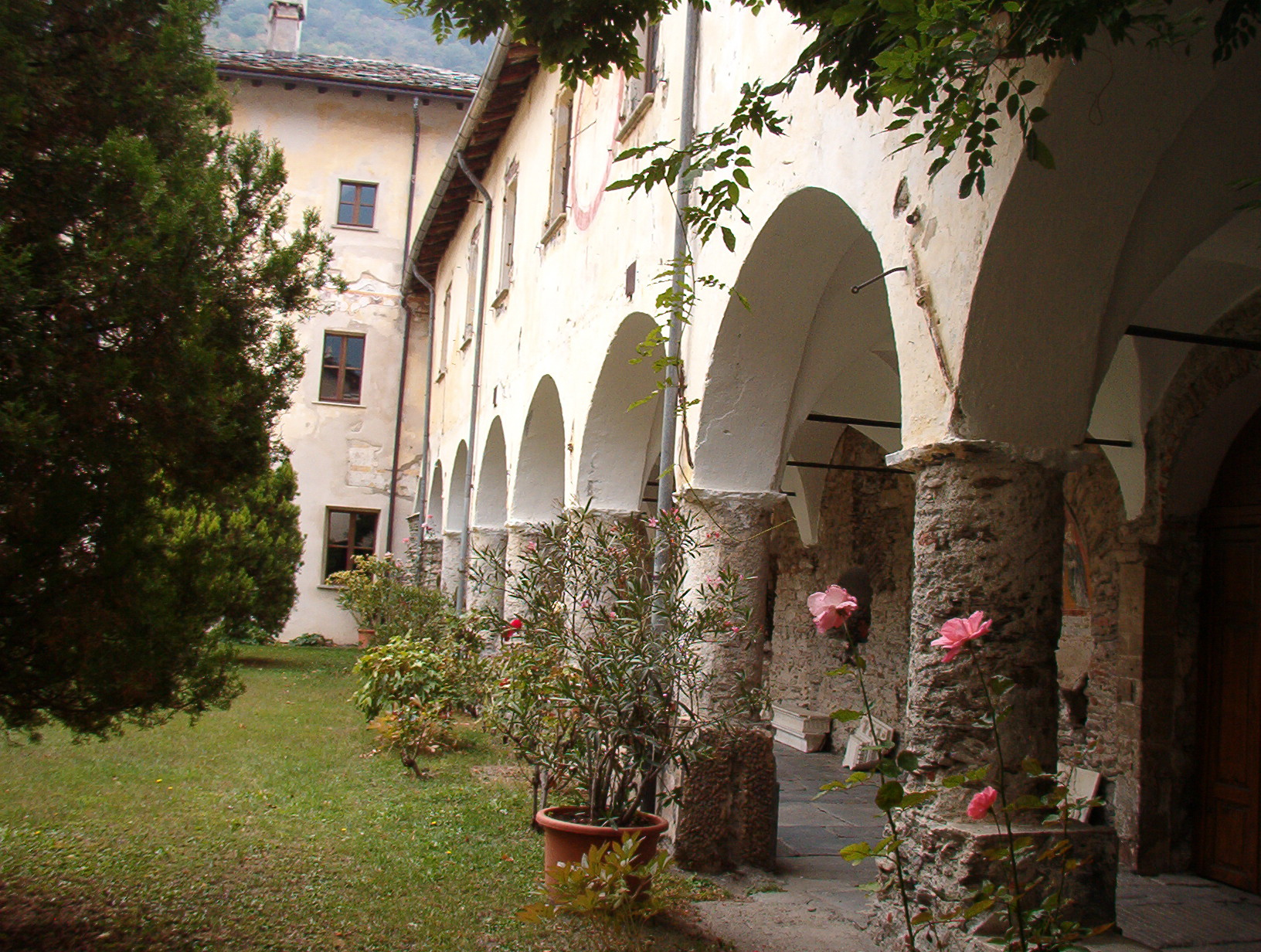
Cloister view

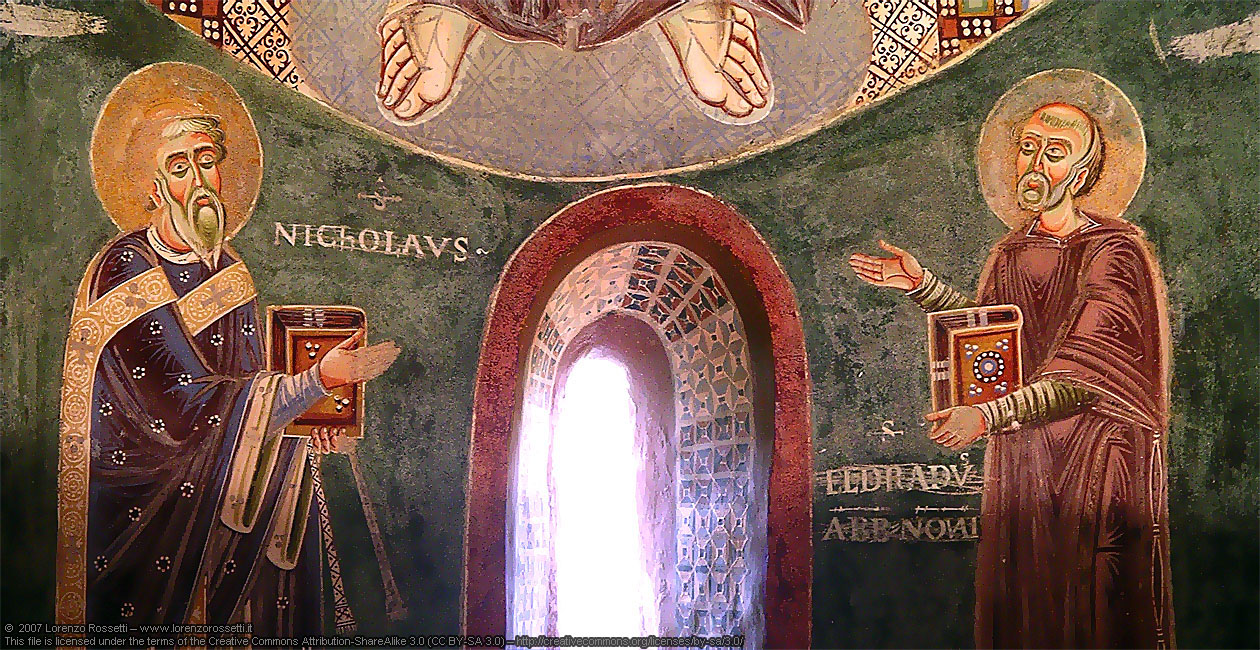
Fresco of the Stories of St. Eldradus and St. Nicholas

The abbey is accessed through a portal leading to a first court, with a three-span portico with groin vaults, surmounted by a loggia. There is another court around which the building revolves: at its centre are the two remaining wings of the 16th century cloister: one has five and the other has seven round arcades, supported by cylindrical columns without capitals. At the crossing between the two cloister wings is the bell tower, built in 1725-1730, which stands at 22.50 metres (73.8 ft). The abbey church is dedicated to Sts. Peter and Paul. It was built in the 18th century above the pre-existing Romanesque church from the 11th century, of which some frescoes, including the Stoning of St. Stephen, remain. The current church is in Baroque style and has a nave with barrel vaults. Half of the nave is used as presbytery, and ends in a semi-circular apse. The counterfaçade houses an organ, built in 1725.

== Chapels in the monastery area ==
Around the monastery are four chapels: one dedicated to Mary (8th century, restored in the 11th century), one to the Holy Saviour (mid-11th century), one to St. Michael (8th-9th century) and one to St. Eldradus. The latter houses a fresco cycle from the late 11th century, depicting stories of the life of St. Eldradus and St. Nicholas. It's one of the first known Nicholas's frescoes in continental Europe.

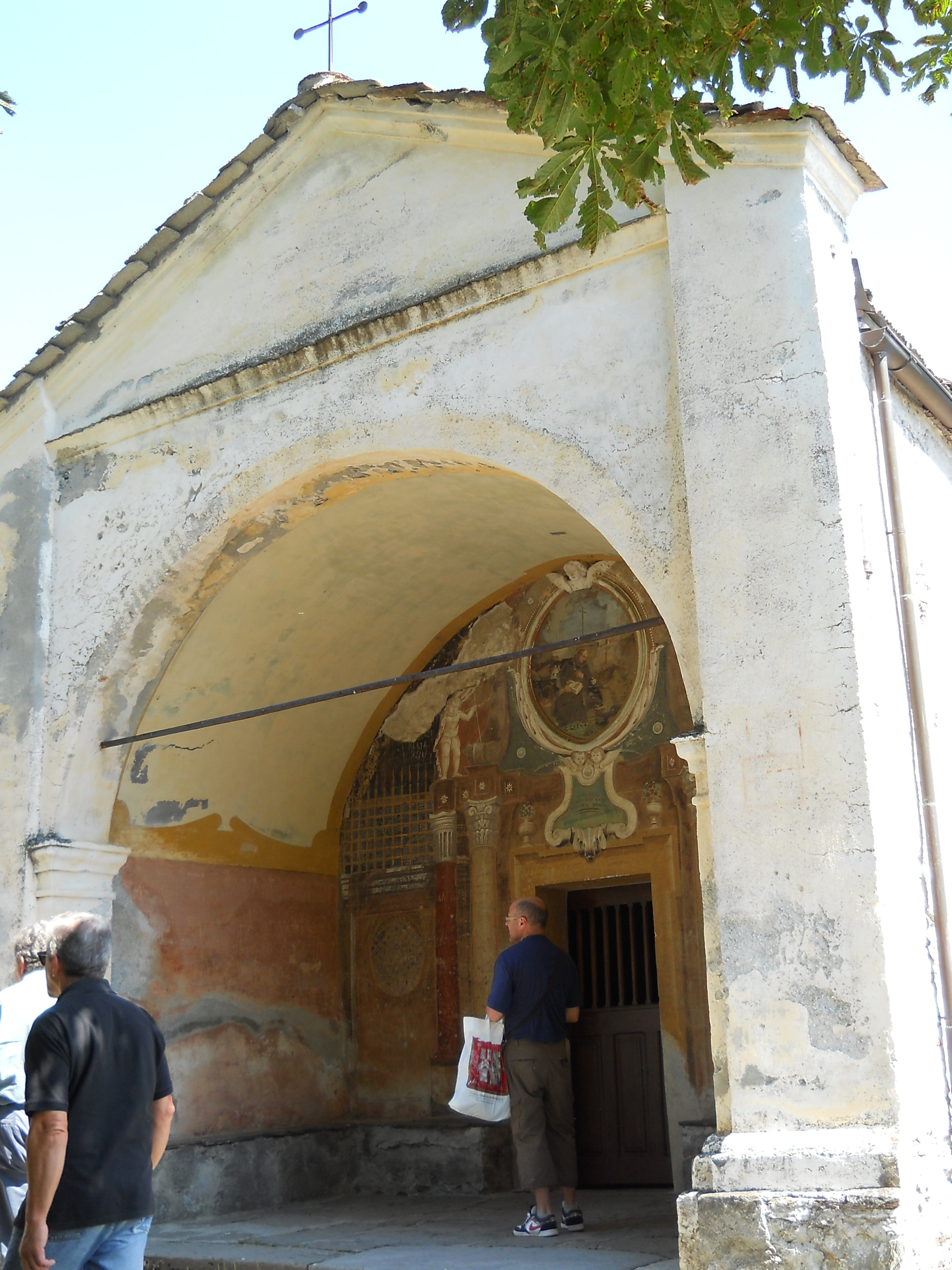
Chapel of Sant'Eldrado

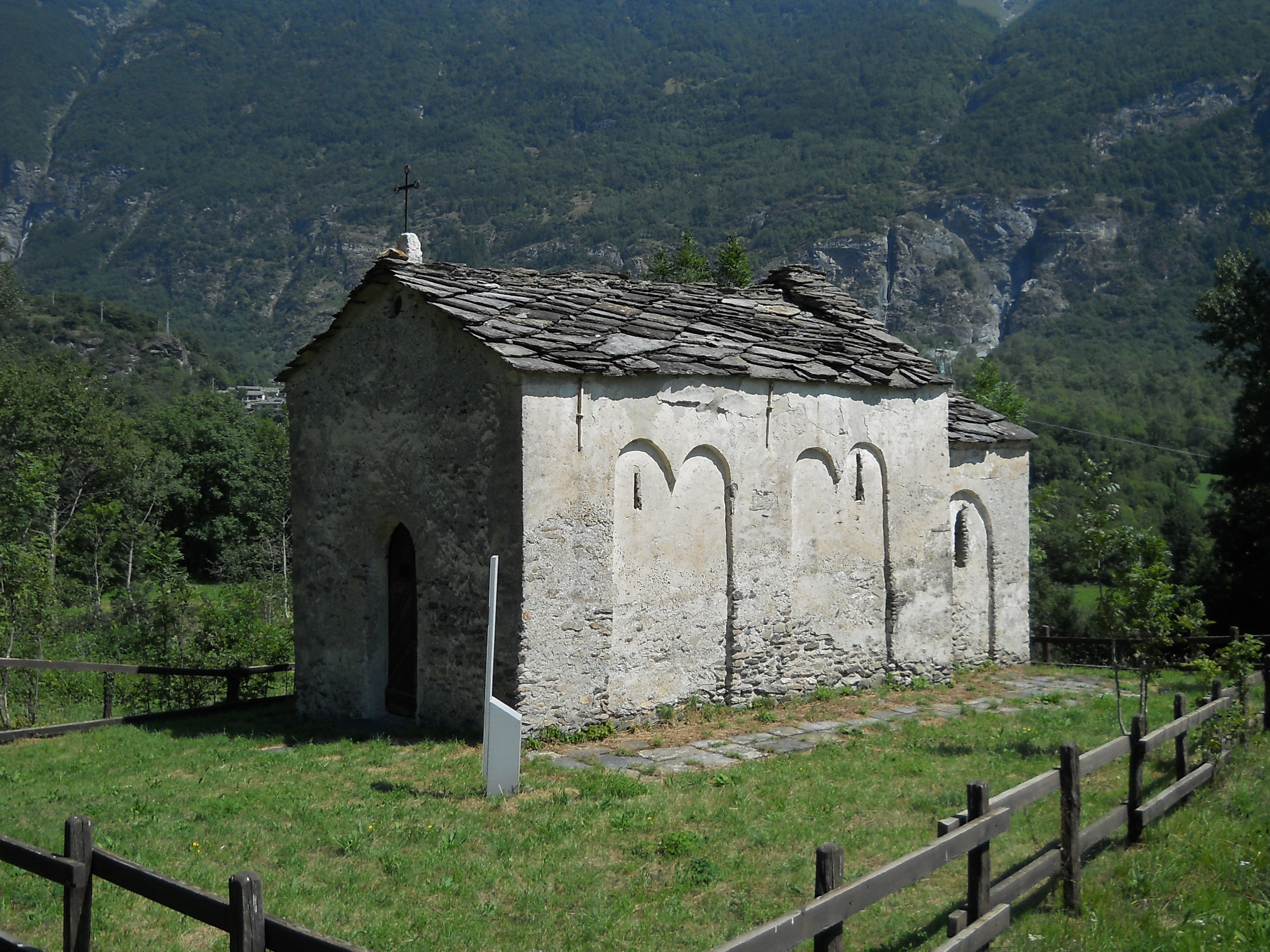
Chapel of Santa Maria

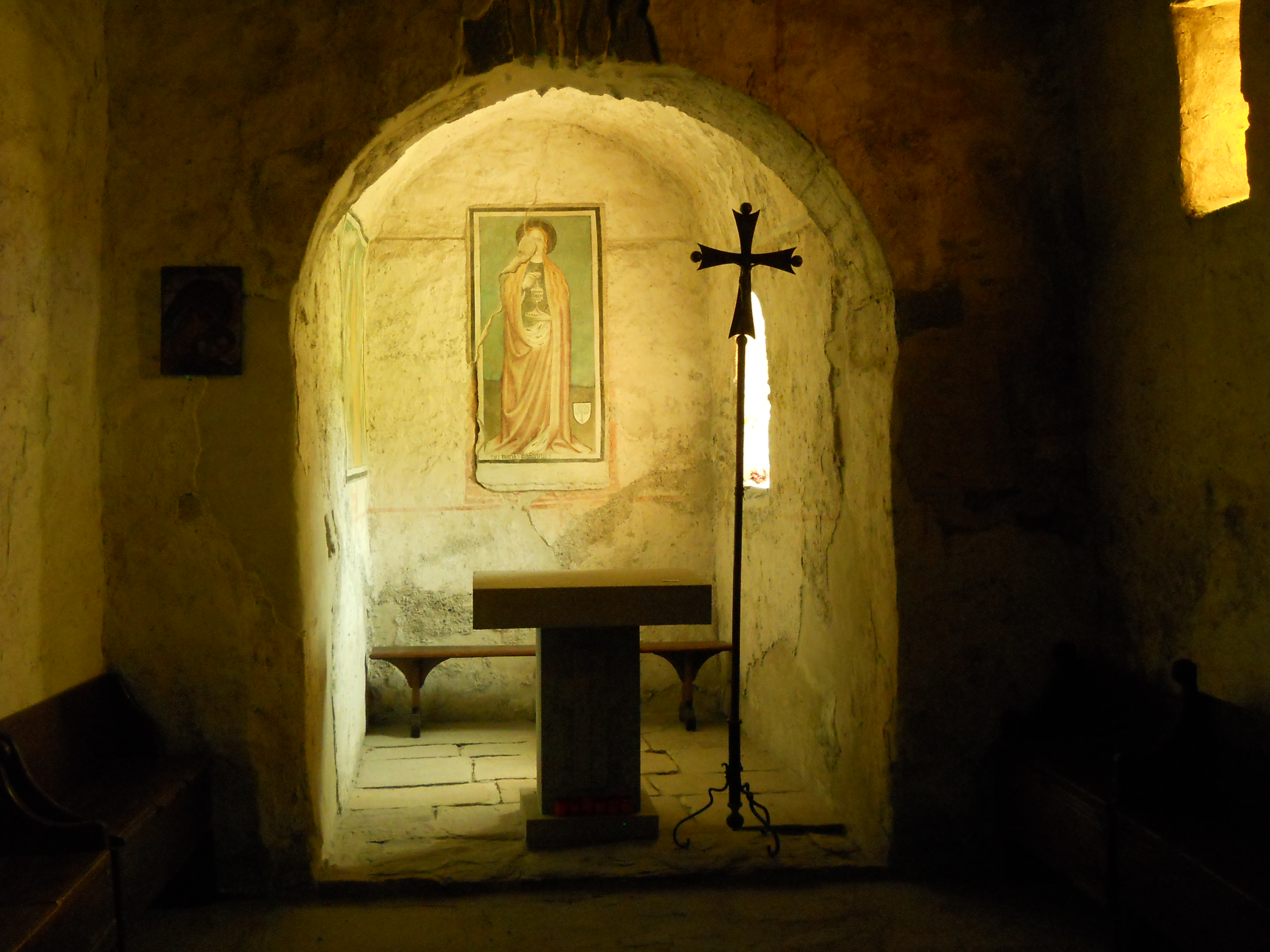
Chapel of Santa Maria

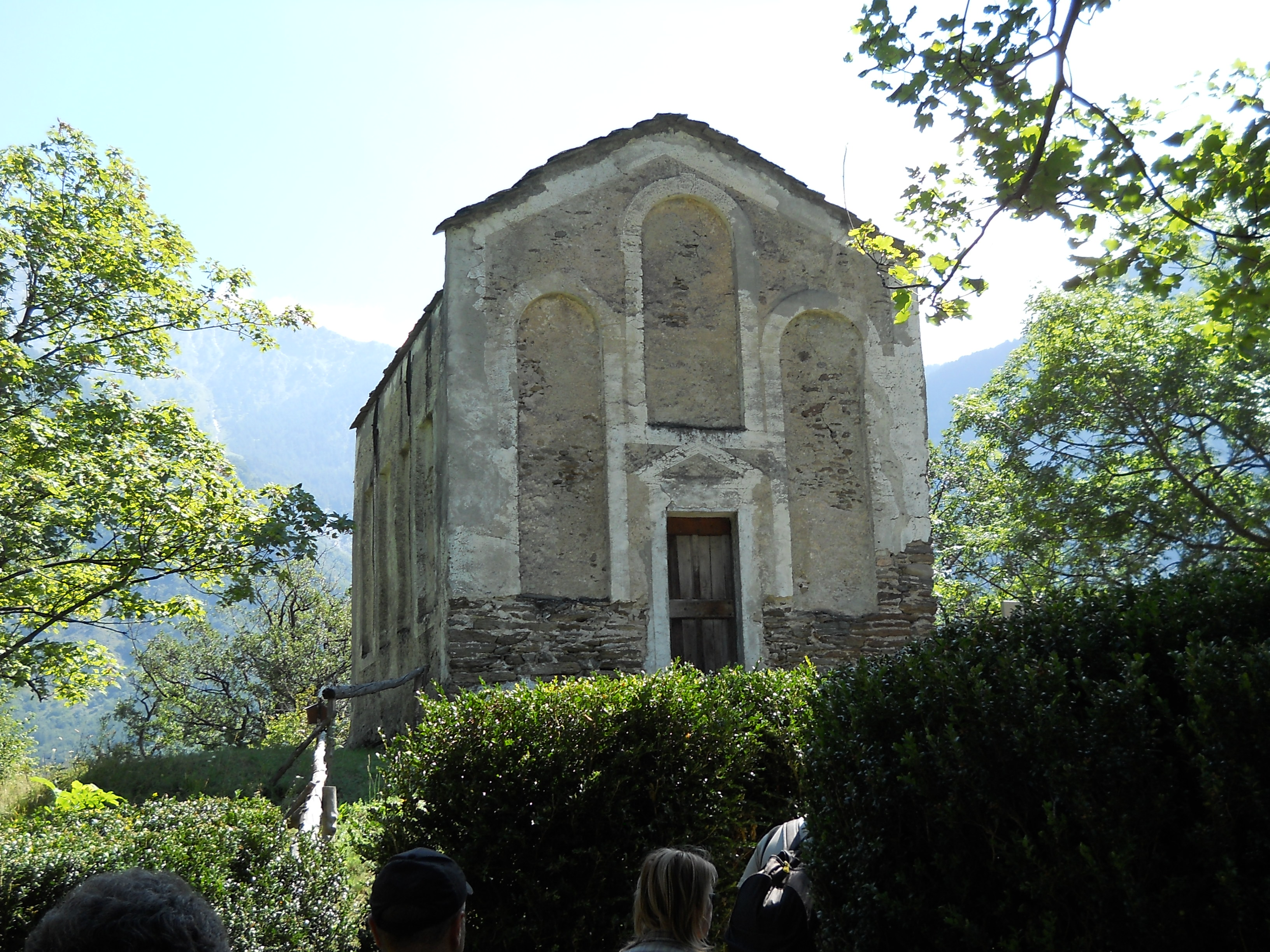
Chapel of San Michele

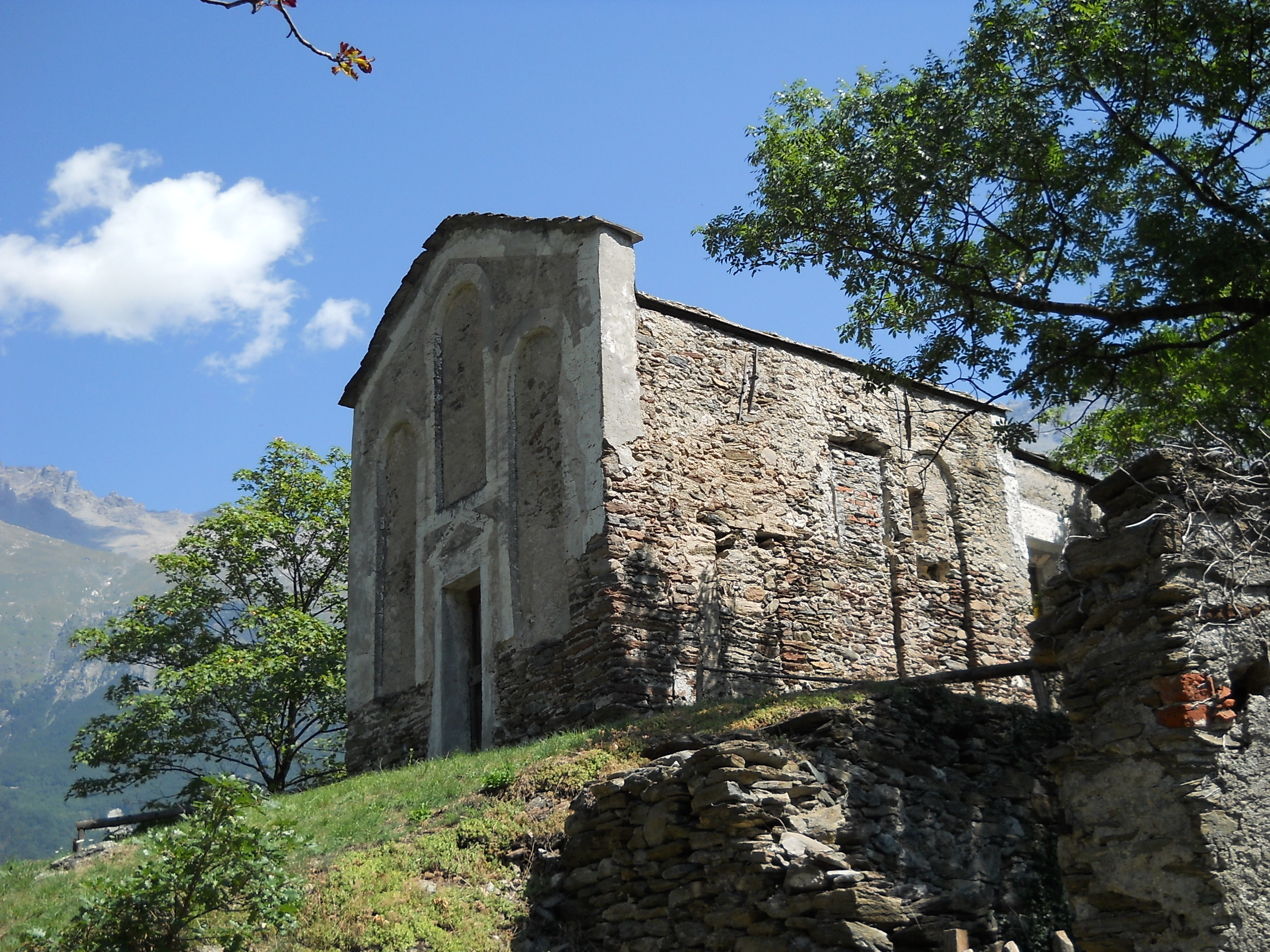
Chapel of San Michele

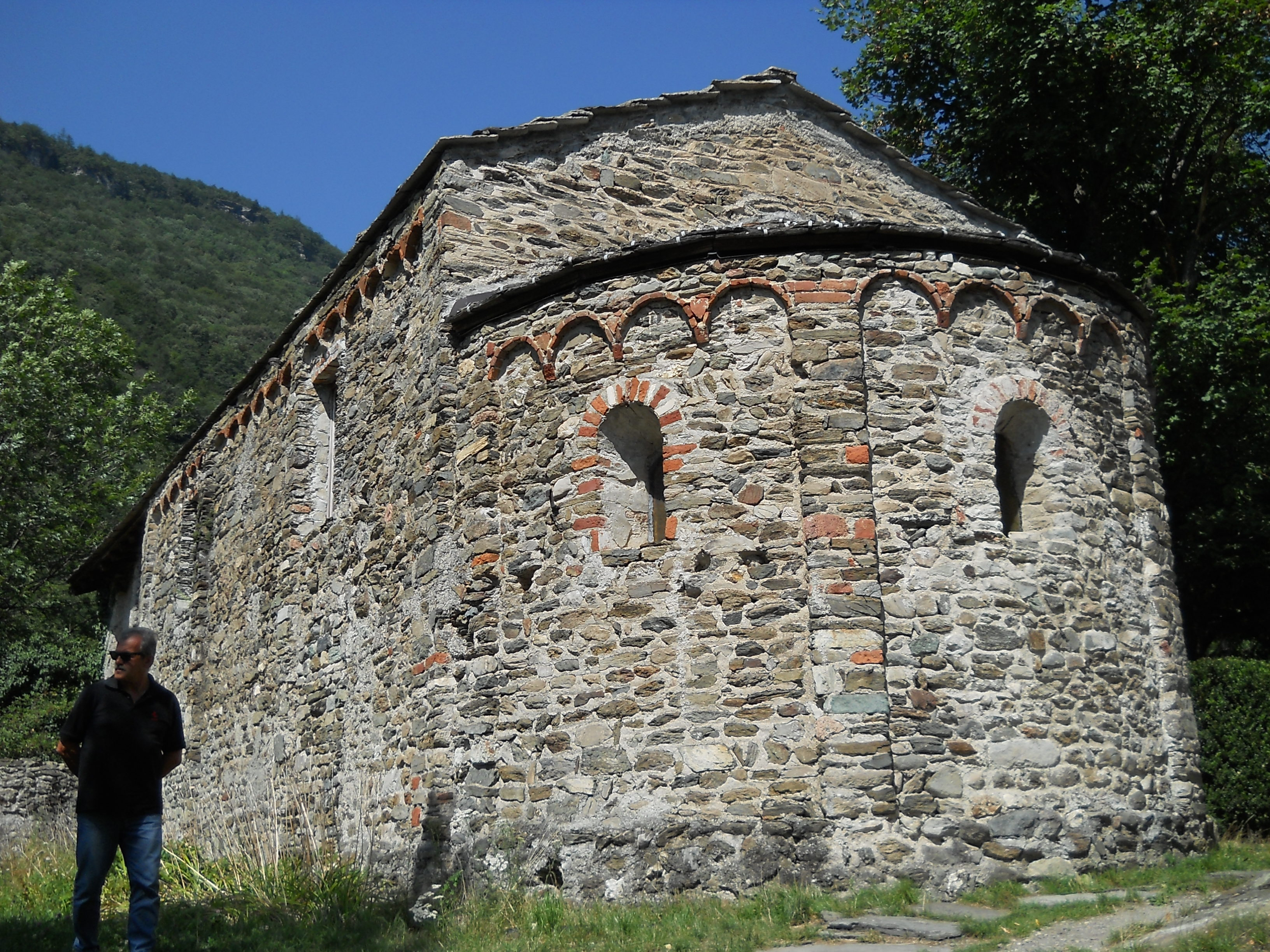
Chapel of San Salvatore

== Fresco cycle of St. Eldradus ==
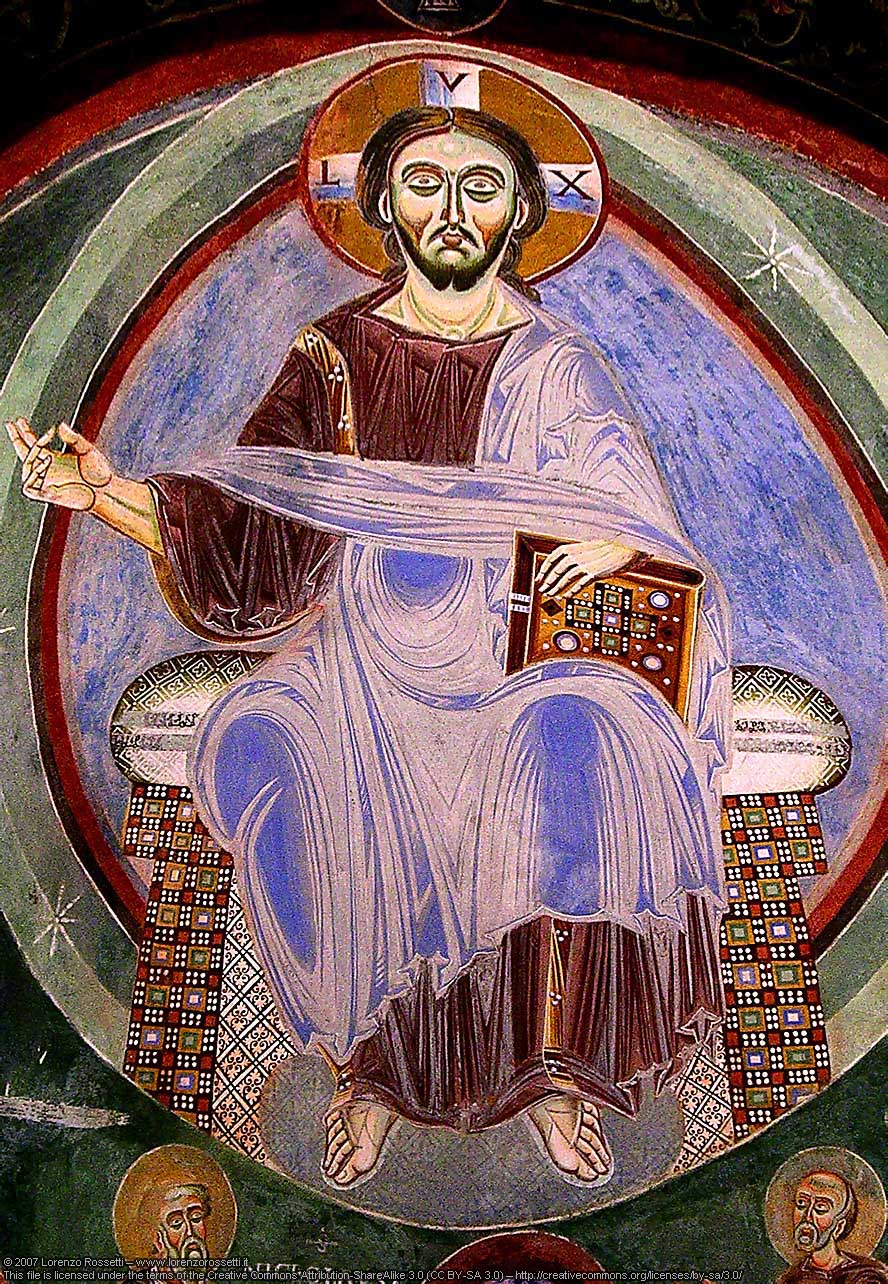
Christ Pantocrator

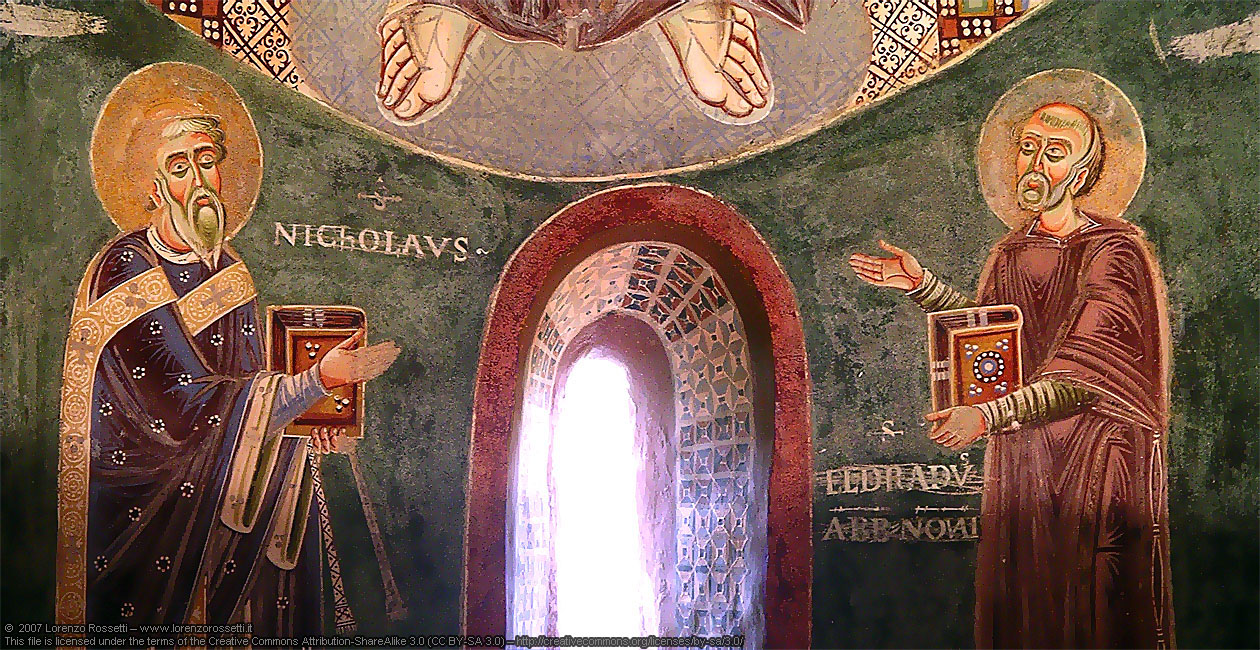
St. Eldradus and St. Nicholas

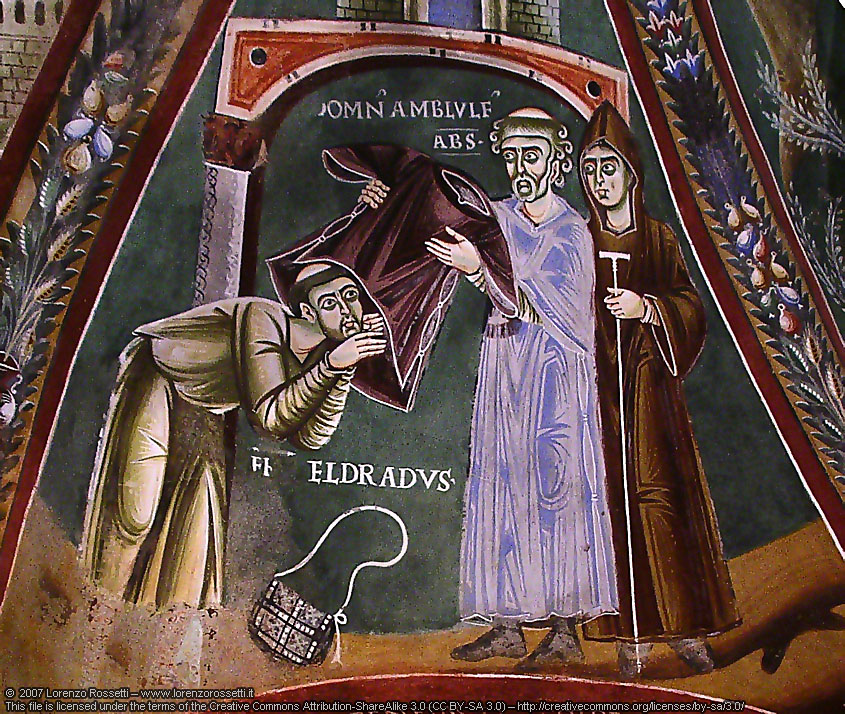
St. Eldradus enters the abbey

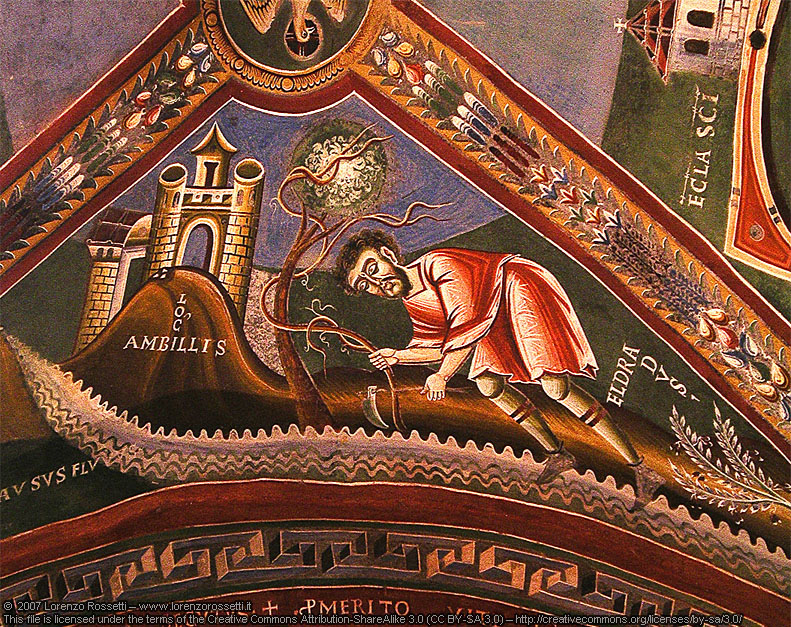
Life of St. Eldradus

== See also ==
- Walter of Aquitaine
- List of Carolingian monasteries
- Carolingian architecture

== Books ==
- Carlo Cipolla, ed. (1898). Monumenta novaliciensia vetustiora: raccolta degli atti e delle cronache riguardanti l'abbazia della Novalesa (in Italian and Latin). Vol. Tomo I. Forzani e c., tip. del Senato.
