= Donatus of Besançon =

Donatus (d. after 658) was a bishop of Besançon, founder of the monastery Palatium (later Saint-Paul) in Besançon and author of a rule for nuns. He is venerated as a saint since the 11th century; his feast day is August 7.

== Background ==
Donatus was a Frankish aristocrat, son of Duke Waldelenus and his wife Flavia. His family belonged to the earliest supporters of the Irish monk Columbanus. He was baptized by Columbanus and entered the monastery of Luxeuil. Before 627 he became bishop of Besançon. He founded a monastery in Besançon dedicated to Saint Paul which received them name Palatium because it was built on the ruins of a palace. The monastery followed the Rule of Columbanus and later become a house of Augustinian Canons.

Most biographical information about Donatus is based on Jonas of Bobbio's Life of Columbanus. References to Donatus in other sources (acts of councils and charters) are listed in Duchesne's Fastes épiscopaux de l'ancienne Gaule, vol. 3.

== Rule of Donatus of Besançon ==
Donatus' mother Flavia founded after the death of her husband a convent in Besançon, probably the monastery Jussa Moutier (Iussanum monasterium). Donatus wrote a monastic rule for this foundation in which he combined elements from the Rule of Benedict, the Rule of Caesarius of Arles and Columbanus' Rule.

The Rule of Donatus is the oldest witness for a textual reception of the Rule of Benedict. The text is preserved in Benedict of Aniane's Codex Regularum.

== Literature ==
- Albrecht Diem, 'New ideas expressed in old words: the Regula Donati on female monastic life and monastic spirituality', in: Viator 43:1 (2012), pp. 1–38.
- L. Duchesne, Fastes épiscopaux de l'ancienne Gaule, vol. 3, Paris: Fontemoing 1915, pp. 213-214.
- Jo Ann McNamara and John E. Halborg, 'The Rule of St. Donatus of Besançon', in: Vox Benedictina 2 (1985), pp. 85–107 and pp. 181–203 (English translation).
- Jo Ann McNamara and John E. Halborg, The ordeal of community, Toronto: Peregrina Pub. 1993 (English translation).
- Gérard Moyse, ‘Les origines du monachisme dans le diocèse de Besançon (Ve-Xe siècles)’, in: Bibliothèque de l’École des Chartes 131 (1973), pp. 21-104 and pp. 369-485, at pp. 372-410.
- Gisela Muschiol, Famula Dei. Zur Liturgie in merowingischen Frauenklöstern, Münster: Aschendorff Verlag 1994 (Beiträge zur Geschichte des alten Mönchtums und des Benediktinertums, vol. 41).
- Adalbert de Vogüé, ‘La règle de Donat pour l’abbesse Gauthstrude’, in: Benedictina 25 (1978), pp. 219–313 (edition of the Regula Donati).
- Michaela Zelzer, ‘Die Regula Donati, der älteste Textzeuge der Regula Benedicti’, in: Regulae Benedicti Studia 16 (1987), pp. 23–36.
- Victoria Zimmerl-Panagl, Donati Regula, Pseudo-Columbani Regula monialium, CSEL 98, Monastica 1, Berlin/Boston: De Gruyter 2015 (critical edition).
