= Traité de numismatique du moyen âge =

The Traité de numismatique du moyen âge was a survey of European medieval coinage by Arthur Engel (1855-1935) and Raymond Serrure (1862-99) issued in three volumes between 1891 and 1905. Arthur Engel was an archaeologist and numismatist, a member of the French Society of Numismatics and the Society of Antiquarians. He was also a member of the French Schools in Rome and Athens. Raymond Surrure's father and grandfather had been noted numismatists. He traded as a coin dealer in Paris and after his death his widow carried on his business until 1913.

== See also ==
- Medieval European Coinage
