= Abbo of Provence =

Abbo was the Patrician of Provence in opposition to Maurontus in the 730s. He was also rector of Maurienne and Susa. Abbo came from the family of Waldelenus in the Besançon. They controlled the Alpine passes of Susa, Embrun, and Gap.

Abbo assisted Charles Martel and Childebrand in campaigning against Maurontus in 736 and 739 in the lower Rhône Valley. After Maurontus was forced to hide in the Alps, Abbo was appointed patricius and showered with lands confiscated from the defeated. Though Abbo had not aligned with the Arnulfings until relatively late, his lack of heirs assured his quick rise to power. When he died, by his will, all of his possessions went to his monastic foundation (726, dedicated to Saint Peter), Novalesa Abbey in the Piedmont.

Abbo's will is of immense historical interest for what it indicates about life in Provence in the early eighth century. It mentions, for example, that Abbo held lands by conquest, but very few fortresses, that he had Frankish and Gallo-Roman underlings in a variety of nonfeudal to semifeudal relationships, and that the legal system which the Franks used in that region was almost entirely Roman in character.

== Sources ==
- Lewis, Archibald R. "The Dukes in the Regnum Francorum, A.D. 550-751." Speculum, Vol. 51, No 3 (July 1976), pp 381–410.
- Lewis, Archibald R. The Development of Southern French and Catalan Society, 718–1050. University of Texas Press: Austin, 1965.
- Geary, Patrick J. Before France and Germany. Oxford University Press: 1988.
- Geary, Patrick J. Aristocracy in Provence: The Rhône Basin at the Dawn of the Carolingian Age. University of Pennsylvania Press: Philadelphia, 1985.
