= Chissey-en-Morvan =

- Commune
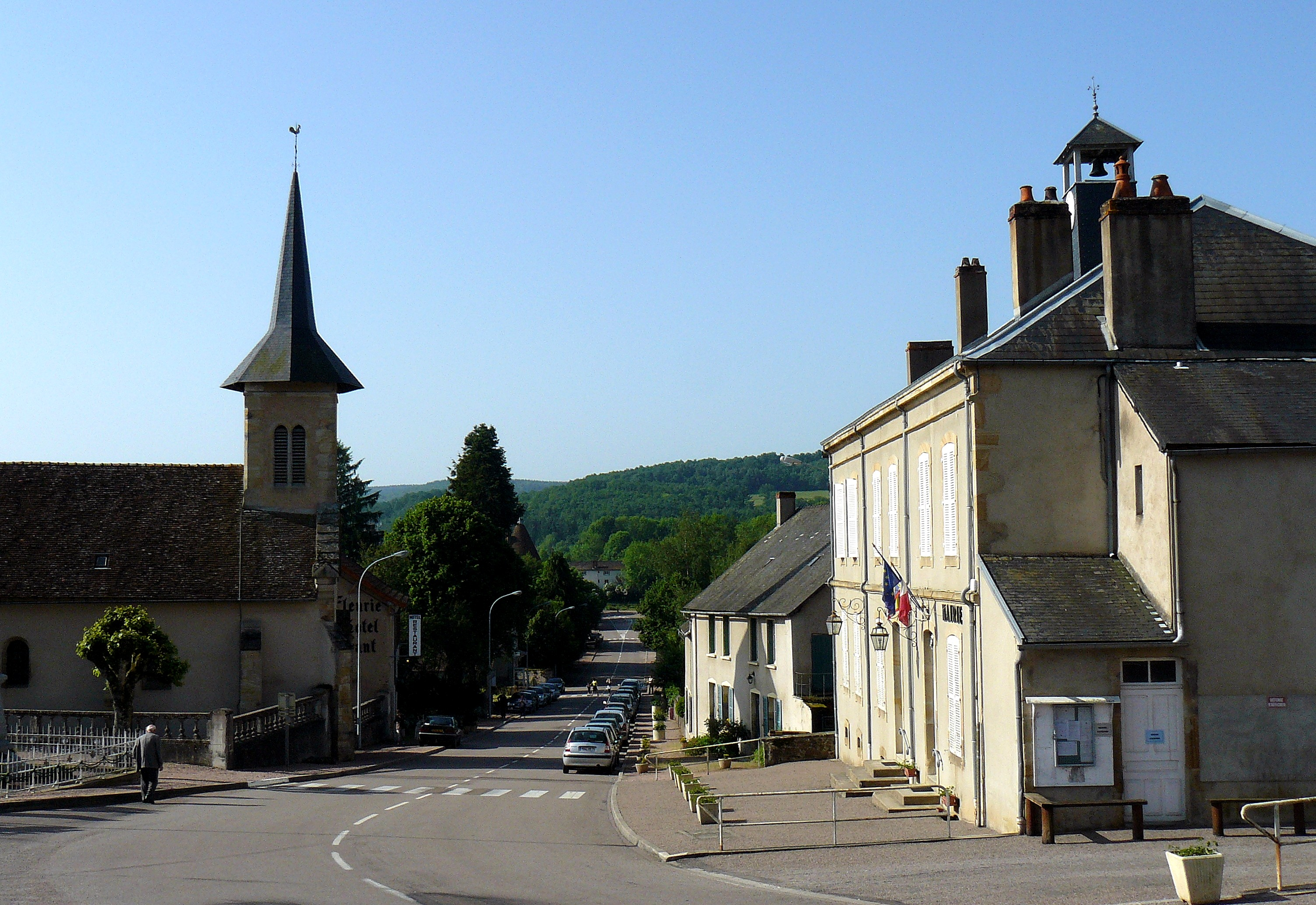
- The church and town hall in Chissey-en-Morvan

- Coat of arms
- Location of Chissey-en-Morvan
- Location within France Location within Bourgogne-Franche-Comté
- Coordinates: 47°07′02″N 4°13′34″E
- Country: France
- Region: Bourgogne-Franche-Comté
- Department: Saône-et-Loire
- Arrondissement: Autun
- Canton: Autun-1
- Intercommunality: CC du Grand Autunois Morvan

Government
  - Mayor (2022–2026): Pascal Pomme
- Area^{1}: 29.9 km^{2} (11.5 sq mi)
- Elevation: 376 m (1,234 ft)
- Highest elevation: 607 m (1,991 ft)
- Lowest elevation: 350 m (1,150 ft)
- Population (2023): 308
  - Density: 10.3/km^{2} (26.7/sq mi)
- Demonym: Chisséens
- Time zone: UTC+01:00 (CET)
  - Summer (DST): UTC+02:00 (CEST)
- INSEE/Postal code: 71129 /71540
- ^{1} French Land Register data, which excludes lakes, ponds, glaciers > 1 km^{2} (0.386 sq mi or 247 acres) and river estuaries.

Chissey-en-Morvan (French pronunciation: [ʃisɛ ɑ̃ mɔʁvɑ̃]; lit. "Chissey-in-Morvan"), commonly referred to simply as Chissey, is a rural commune in the Saône-et-Loire department in the Bourgogne-Franche-Comté region in central-east France.

Bordering both Nièvre and Côte-d'Or, it is part of Morvan Regional Natural Park.

== History ==
The Buis hoard of 7th-century gold coins was found in Chissey-en-Morvan in 1855.

On 26 June 1944, amid World War II, German occupying forces motivelessly executed three local teenagers in Vauchezeuil, northeast of the village of Chissey-en-Morvan, who happened to be passing through.

== See also ==
- Communes of the Saône-et-Loire department
- Morvan Regional Natural Park
