= Aega (mayor of the palace) =

Aega (also spelled Ega or Egua) was Dagobert I's most trusted adviser according to Fredegar IV, 62 ('Aega uero a citeris Neptrasiis consilio Dagoberti erat adsiduos.'). He became mayor of the palace and regent, alongside the queen mother Nanthild, of Neustria and Burgundy from 639, on the death of Dagobert I, to his death in 641, during the reign of the minor Clovis II. He was a hardened opponent of the local Burgundian nobility. On his death, at Clichy, Nanthild replaced him in Burgundy by Flaochad, a Frank and like opponent of the local power factions. The magnates elevated Erchinoald to his mayoralty in Neustria.

Preceded by Gundoald	Mayor of the Palace of Neustria; 639–641	Succeeded by Erchinoald
Preceded by Brodulf	Mayor of the Palace of Burgundy; 639–641	Succeeded by Flaochad
