= Maurontus =

Early 8th century Duke of Provence

Maurontus was the Duke or Patrician of Provence in the early 8th century (720s and 730s). He aspired to independence in the face of Charles Martel, Duke of the Franks, and the Provençal patrician Abbo.

Maurontus appeared in the Chronicle of Fredegar as a dux. He might have been related to the Neustrian mayor of the palace Waratton. While Maurontus desired to be free from the Pippinid dominance then affecting the rest of Francia, he may have paid homage to the Merovingian kings. Just before his reign are found customs agents of Chilperic II in Marseille, the seat of Maurontus power. Like the other Provençal patricians of his era, his power was primarily personal, relating to the lands and ecclesiastical offices he controlled. For this reason, Maurontus' power was not opposed only by the Pippinids and their allies, but by local families, like that of Waldelenus around Besançon, which controlled the passes of Susa, Gap, and Embrun into Italy.

In or before 736, he called in the aid of Yusuf ibn 'Abd al-Rahman al-Fihri, Wali of Narbonne, to garrison Avignon, though some sources indicate that this city was conquered not granted, along with Arles. Other sources place the timing of the event after 736. In that year, Martel invaded the Rhone Valley with his brother Childebrand, and devastated the region, taking Arles and Avignon and confining Maurontus to Marseille. From there, the patrician and his supporters rebelled, but Childebrand and the Lombards decisively defeated them near Avignon and forced Maurontus to go into hiding in the Alps.

Maurontus' descendant and namesake was the bishop of Marseille, Maurontus.

== Sources ==
- Lewis, Archibald R. "The Dukes in the Regnum Francorum, A.D. 550-751." Speculum, Vol. 51, No 3 (July 1976), pp 381–410.
- Lewis, Archibald R. The Development of Southern French and Catalan Society, 718–1050. University of Texas Press: Austin, 1965.
- Geary, Patrick J. Before France and Germany. Oxford University Press: 1988.
- Hodgkin, Thomas. Italy and her Invaders Vol. VIII. Clarendon Press: 1895.
