= Flaochad =

Flaochad (or Flaochat) was the mayor of the palace of Burgundy from 641 to 642. He was appointed by Nanthild, the queen mother, who gave him her niece, Ragnobert, in marriage. She called together the chief magnates and bishops of the kingdom at Orléans and he was acclaimed mayor.

The Burgundian patrician Willibad had a long-running feud with Flaochad when the latter was appointed mayor. Flaochad immediately set out to destroy Willibad. At a court at Chalon, Flaochad tried to assassinate him, but, failing, instead left his palace to challenge him to a duel, which Flaochad's brother Amalbert prevented from happening.

Finally Flaochad convinced Clovis II to hold a court near Autun and summon Willibad. The two Burgundian magnates met in a pitched battle and Willibad was killed. Flaochad only survived him eleven days, dying of a fever. According to Fredegar, who seems to have been personally interested in this event, the last which he recorded, both were the victims of divine judgement, for they had sworn friendship in holy places and had subsequently despoiled land to enrich themselves and made war on each other.

Flaochad is the last mayor in Burgundy independent of Neustria. Upon his death, Erchinoald of Neustria became mayor.

== Sources ==
- Geary, Patrick J. Before France and Germany. Oxford University Press: 1988.
- Wallace-Hadrill, J. M. The Long-Haired Kings and other Studies in Frankish History. Butler & Tanner Ltd: London, 1962.
- Lewis, Archibald R. "The Dukes in the Regnum Francorum, A.D. 550-751." Speculum, Vol. LI, No. 3. July, 1976. pp 381 – 410.

Preceded by Aega	Mayor of the Palace of Burgundy; 641–642	Succeeded by Erchinoald
