= Amalo =

Burgundian duke, c. 530 – 589

Amalo (c. 530 – 589) was a Burgundian duke in the area around Dijon. He is best known from his appearance in the works of Gregory of Tours, and was an early progenitor of the Etichonid clan, from which the Habsburgs originate.

== Origin ==
Amalo was likely a Burgundian, judging from his name's formation from the East Germanic Amal tribe, with his family migrating as part of the expansion of Burgundian rule under King Gundobad. The Battle of Autun in 532 had ended Burgundian independence, but the family remained wealthy and influential in the area between Dijon and Besançon even under Frankish rule.

Amalo had at least one son, who is not mentioned in the contemporary sources; it therefore remains unclear whether he succeeded his father as a duke.

Amalo's grandson Amalgar, on the other hand, is well attested as Duke of Pagus Attoriensis (Burgundy), especially through the Chronicle of Fredegar and Merovingian documents, and was one of the most influential greats of the Frankish Empire of his time.

Under Eticho, Amalo's great-great-grandson and ancestor of the Ethichonid family, the noble family finally came into the hereditary possession of Alsace in the middle of the 7th century.

== Representation by Gregory of Tours ==
Amalo is one of the few dukes among the early Merovingian rulers, here Chlothar I, whose existence is secured by contemporary sources—Amalo is mentioned several times in the Ten Books Stories of the bishop and historian Gregory of Tours.

Gregory reports that in addition to an apartment, the duke also owned at least one estate, probably near Autun, which, according to the customs of the time, was probably managed by his wife.

Gregory of Tours' description of the duke is consistently negative—the historian characterizes Amalo as a violent drunkard and libertine who did not shy away from attempting to rape a young woman. Correspondingly violent, Gregory also describes the death of Amalo:

"When Dux Amalo had sent his wife to another country estate to take care of the economy there, he became enthusiastic about a young girl of his class. And when he was drunk with wine that night, he sent servants to kidnap the girl and take her to her bed. She resisted and was forcibly abducted into his house, slapping her face so that her nose bled and blood covered her, which is why the duke's bed was stained with it. He also gave her fists, slaps and other things, then took her in his arms and was overwhelmed by sleep. But she stretched out her hand above the man's head and took his sword. She pulled it out of its sheath and hit his head with it like Judith's that of Holofernes. He gave a scream whereupon the servants gathered. But when they wanted to kill her, he shouted: 'I beg you, don't kill her. I have sinned in wanting to violate chastity...' As he spoke this, he breathed out his spirit. The girl flees into a church, throws herself at the king's feet and laments her suffering. He puts them under his protection. We have learned that through God's assistance, the girl's chastity was in no way violated by her savage kidnapper."
