= Arthur Engel (numismatist) =

Arthur Engel (1855-1935) was a French archaeologist and numismatist, a member of the French Society of Numismatics and the Society of Antiquarians. He was also a member of the French Schools in Rome and Athens. With Raymond Surrure (1862–99), he wrote Traité de numismatique du moyen âge.

== Biography ==
The son of Frédéric Engel-Dollfus, an industrialist from Mulhouse, one of the founders of the city's Archaeological Museum and patron of the École française de Rome, he was an associate member of the School from 1878 to 1880. In 1881, he became an honorary member of the French School at Athens.

In 1886, the Ministry of Public Instruction commissioned him to conduct research in the Seville region of Spain. He then conducted extensive excavations in Italica under the patronage of Léon Heuzey, who asked him to check whether there were any other pre-Roman statues at Cerro de los Santos.

Upon his arrival in Andalusia, Engel became friends with George Bonsor and joined him in his work in the Guadalquivir and Gentil valleys, as well as in the 1890 excavations of ancient Arva in Alcolea del Rio. He then hired Pierre Paris to accompany them. Engel discovered the Lady of Elche, which Paris quickly acquired for the Louvre (1897).

In 1898, Paris and Engel proposed a project for archaeological missions in Spain, which was not accepted, but which Paris would carry out in 1928. They directed the excavations at Osuna, where Engel purchased a plot of land where fragments of pre-Roman statues had been found (1900). In 1904, the two men explored Cerro de la Cruz in Almedinilla (province of Cordoba).

With Bonsor, Engel also created an archaeological map of Andalusia.

== Selected publications ==
- Recherches sur la numismatique et la sigillographie des Normands de Sicile et d'Italie, 1882
- Numismatique de l'Alsace, 1887
- Répertoire des sources imprimées de la numismatique française, 1887-1889
- Traité de numismatique du Moyen âge, 1891-1905
- Fouilles exécutées aux environs de Séville, in Revue archéologique XVII, 1891, p. 87-92
- La nécropole romaine de Carmona, avec G. Bonsor, Revue archéologique XVII, 1891, p. 385-389
- Quelques collections espagnoles, 1891
- Rapport sur une mission archéologique en Espagne (1891), 1893
- Nouvelles et correspondance d'Espagne, Revue archéologique XXIX, 1896, p. 204-229
- Une forteresse ibérique à Osuna, fouilles de 1903, avec P. Paris, in Nouvelles Archives des missions scientifiques et littéraires № 13, 1906
