= Erchinoald =

Mayor of the Palace

Erchinoald (also Erkinoald and, in French, Erchenout) succeeded Aega as the mayor of the palace of Neustria in 641 and succeeded Flaochad in Burgundy in 642 and remained such until his death in 658.

== Family ==
According to Fredegar, he was a relative (consanguineus) of Dagobert I's mother. Chaume cites the Notitia de Fundatione Monasterii Glanderiensis to suggest that Erchinoald was son of the Gallo Roman senator Ansbertus, and that Erchinoald's son, Leudesius, was therefore a descendant of the Gallo-Roman families of the Syagrii and Ferrèoli Erchinoald's relationship with Merovingian King Dagobert has been proposed to have been through his mother Gerberga, daughter of Burgundian dux Ricomeres (fl. 575) and Bertrude, her putative sister, and mother of King Dagobert. According to Alban Butler, Erchinoald was brother to Adalbard of Ostrevent and Sigefrid, count of Ponthieu. Herchenfrida (Erchinfreda), mother of St. Desiderius of Cahors will have also been of this family as is further evidenced inter alia by that Gallo-Roman saint's close ties to King Dagobert, and a brother named "Syagrius".

Erchinoald introduced Balthild, an Anglo-Saxon slave, most probably of a high-ranking Anglo Saxon family from East Anglia (later canonised), to Clovis II, king of Neustria. The king's marriage to the pious Balthild reinforced Erchinoald's position at court. It has been suggested given the rarity of the name element "Erchin" (Genuine or truly) among the Franks and Saxons that Queen Emma of Kent, thought to be from Frankia, and the wife of Eadbald of Kent was of this family and perhaps Erchinoald's daughter. Eadbald and Emma had a son Eorconbert b. ca. 618 so Emma was probably born before 600 and was not a daughter but a sister or less likely a cousin of Erchinoald. This was a period of considerable Frankish influence in Kent and East Anglia and as one of the most powerful men in Frankia located at his estate at Peronne not far from the English channel when he was not at court, it was Erchinoald who wielded this influence during his lifetime. Erchinoald supported efforts of successors of the Augustinian mission to England. One notable manner in which he both exerted influence and aided the mission was his involvement in and support of convents within his sphere of influence in Neustria (for example Faremoutiers) into which some of the princesses of Kent, such as Eorcongota and East Anglia such as Aethelburg and Saethryth, in most cases his relations, retired and were made abbess.

Erchinoald himself married Leutsinde. Through her he had a son, Leudesius, who became the mayor of the palace of Neustria in 675.

Erchinoald died in 658 and was succeeded by Ebroin, chosen by the Frankish nobles. Although his son, Leudesius, and much of his family were destroyed in the conflict between the factions of Leudegar of Autun and Ebroin in 676, the name does resurface in the 7th century in Frankia suggesting he may have had some descendants who survived; Chaume has posited a sister who was ancestor to a number of powerful families during the Carolingian era such as the Guerinids, the counts of Gatinais, and the Guidonids.

Preceded by Aega	Mayor of the Palace of Neustria; 641–658	Succeeded by Ebroin
Preceded by Flaochad	Mayor of the Palace of Burgundy; 642–658	Succeeded by Ebroin

== Notes ==
- Chaume, Maurice ' 'Les origines du Duche de Bourgogne' '. Darmstadt: Scientia Verlag Aalen, 1977.
- Le Jan, Regne "Convents, Violence and Competition for Power in Francia." in Theuws, Frans; De Jong, Mayke; van Rhijn, Carine ' 'Topographies of power in the Early Middle Ages' '. Leeiden: Koninkslijke Brill NV, 2001.

== Sources ==
- Bede, ' 'Ecclesiastical History of the English People' '. London: Penguin Classics, 1990.
