= Châtelaine de Vergy =

Anonymous Old French 13th-century verse romance

- Miniature at the start of Châtelaine in a 14th-century manuscript
- Author(s): Anonymous
- Language: Old French
- Date: 13th-century
- Genre: Chivalric romance
- Verse form: 8 syllable rhymed couplets
- Length: 958 lines

The Châtelaine de Vergy (or Chastelaine de Vergi) is an anonymous short 13th-century romance of courtly love in Old French.

== Overview ==
The poem consists of approximately 958 lines of verse in octosyllabic rhyming couplets. The work is in the same poetic form as the majority of medieval French romans, although significantly shorter than the romances of Chrétien de Troyes. The work has come down to us in 20 manuscripts, though manuscripts C and G are the ones most commonly referred to, with the Folio Classiques edition using the former, which has 958 lines, and the Livre de Poche edition using the latter of 965 verses. The oldest extant version was written in the late 13th century, in approximately 1288, and the presumed date for the composition of the work is the first half of that century. Some critics believe that the romance (other than the ending) is a roman à clef and that elements are based on true events.

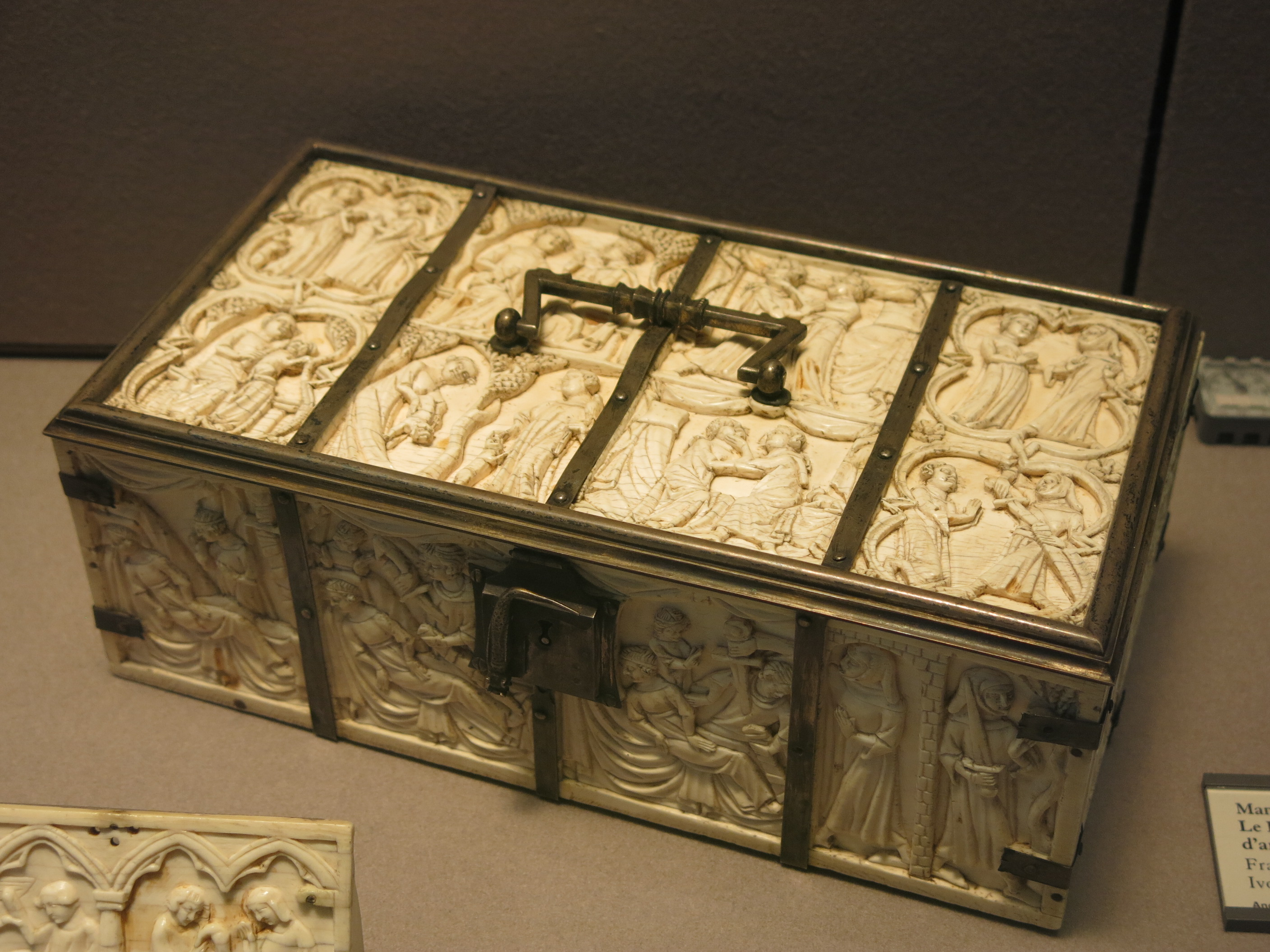
A 14th-century casket with decoration based on the Châtelaine de Vergy, now in the Louvre. One of six surviving examples, of which the British Library's is the best executed.

The Châtelaine de Vergy was apparently very popular in courtly circles. There exists as well a 15th-century prose version of the tale, and the plot was reused by Marguerite de Navarre in one of her Heptaméron short stories (tale LXX). There are also multiple examples of the tale being portrayed in art, including various caskets depicting scenes from the poem.

Whether or not the text is part of the courtly love tradition has been widely debated, especially given Gaston Paris and C. S. Lewis' definitions of the concept.

== Plot ==
The Châtelaine de Vergy tells the story of an unnamed knight in the service of the Duke of Burgundy who is the lover of the Châtelaine of Vergy, the Duke's niece. The Châtelaine has accepted this knight's love on one condition: that he must keep their relationship secret from everyone, and that when he comes to visit her, he must wait for her little dog to come out to him in the garden, which signals that she is alone and the knight may come see her.

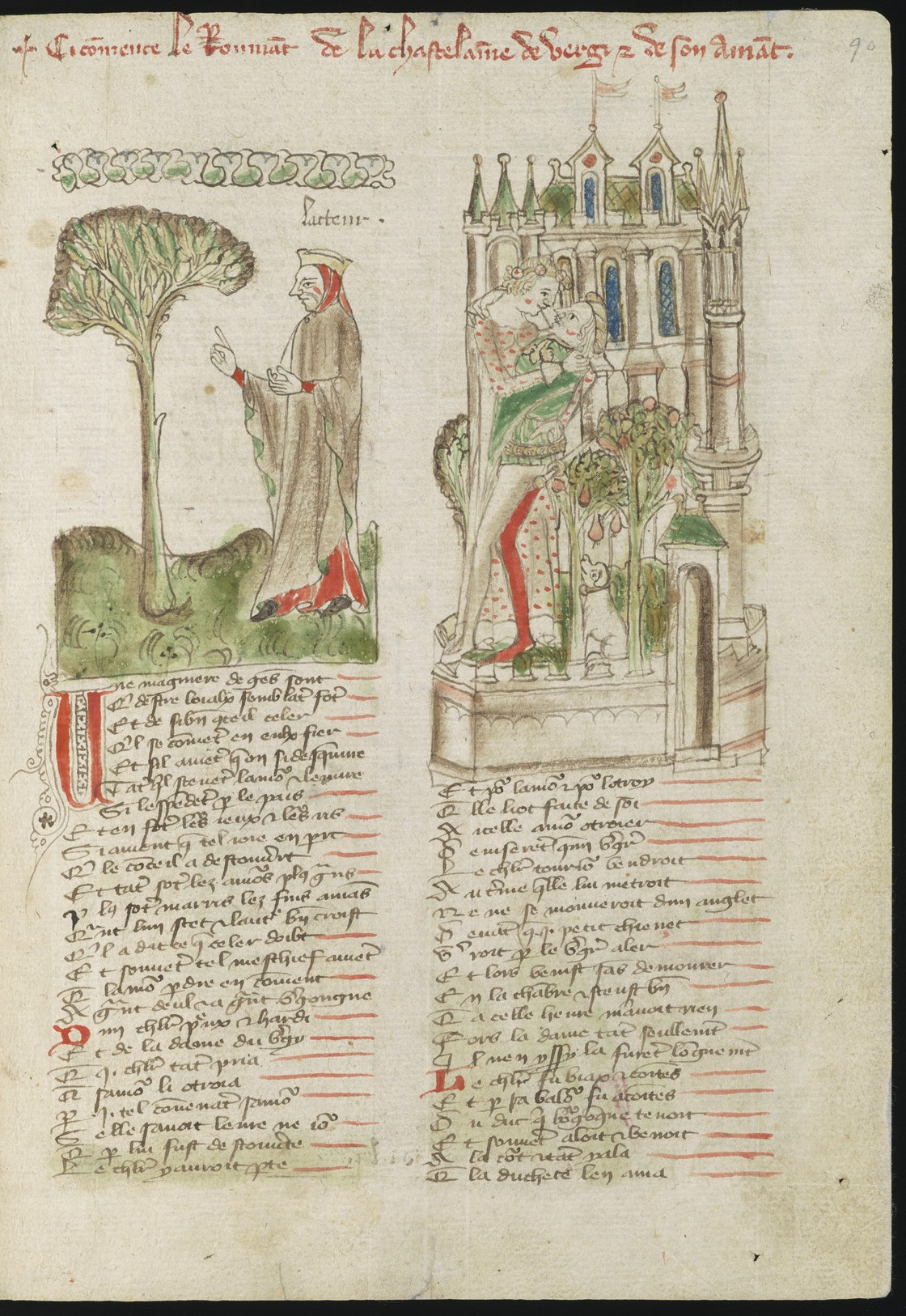
Early 15th-century illustrated copy of Châtelaine from Trinity Hall, MS 12, folio 90r

When the Duchess of Burgundy falls in love with the knight, he is forced to spurn her advances, citing his loyalty to the Duke and his love for another. In her anger, the Duchess then tells her husband that the knight is unfaithful and has tried to seduce her, and the Duke accuses the knight of treachery. To save his honor, and to avoid being exiled (and thus forced to distance himself from his mistress), the knight, once the lord has promised to keep his secret, reveals to his lord where his heart truly lies, thus violating his promise to his mistress.

The Duke reveals the truth of the knight's love to his wife, trusting her to keep the secret; but, at the feast of Pentecoste, the Duchess makes a cruel inside joke to the Châtelaine about her lover and her "well-trained dog". The Châtelaine realizes her lover has not kept his promise and she dies in despair. The knight discovers her body and kills himself. The Duke finds both bodies, and exacts vengeance on his wife by killing her with the knight's sword, and then becomes a knight Templar.
