= Nanthild =

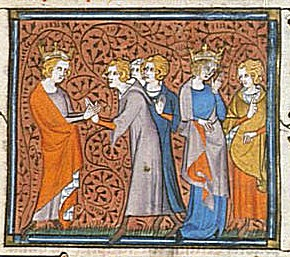

Queen consort of Neustria and Burgundy
- Tenure: c. 629 – 19 January 639
- Born: c. 610
- Died: 642; Landry, Burgundy
- Burial: Basilica of Saint-Denis
- Spouse: Dagobert I
- Issue: Clovis II

Nanthild (c. 610 – 642), also known as Nantéchilde, Nanthechilde, Nanthildis, Nanthilde, or Nantechildis, was a Frankish queen consort and regent, the second wife (of his eventual four wives) of Dagobert I, king of the Franks (629–639). She was regent during the minority of her son from 639 until 642. Throughout her life, she demonstrated political prowess.

== Life ==
She was of Saxon lineage, born about 608 or 610. The Lexikon des Mittelalters calls her ein Mädchen aus dem Dienstpersonal ("a maiden of the royal [ Austrasian ] household"). Her elevation to consort may have given importance to her relatives: her brother Lanthegisel was an important landowner in the Limousin and a relation of Aldegisel. Dagobert set aside his wife Gomentrude to marry her, ca. 629. Nanthild gave birth to Clovis II, the second eldest of Dagobert's surviving sons and the one who succeeded him in Neustria and Burgundy.

After Dagobert's death in January 639, she was initially regent for her son, accompanied by Aega, mayor of the Neustrian palace and an opponent of the powerful contingent of nobles headed by Burgundofaro whose seat was at Meaux. In the interest of reducing noble Burgundian independence of the Merovingian palace, she married her niece Ragnoberta to the Frank Flaochad and had the magnates and bishops of the realm of Burgundy acclaim him mayor of the palace at Orléans in 642.

During the regency, she held one third of the treasure that had belonged to her late husband, Dagobert. This demonstrates a genuine financial power. Additionally, she had judicial power, as she demonstrated by granting permission for the family of Chainulf (who had been murdered) to destroy the property of Ermenfred, the person who had murdered him.

A few years after becoming regent, she died at Landry in what was then Burgundy, where she had long resided. According to legend, her body was translated to the Saint Denis Basilica. Some speculate that she was poisoned or secretly murdered, as her untimely death allowed her son to fall under the influence of the nobility, who abhorred a strong royal hand.
