= Scara =

A scara (plural scarae) was a contingent or unit of soldiers, possibly cavalry, in Carolingian armies. Sources, however, cite that this unit performed different kinds of military functions and is defined according to the specific operation it performed.

== Etymology ==
The term is a Latinized form of an ancient Germanic word meaning "group", compare modern German "schar" and modern Dutch "schaar" which can refer to a group or group of soldiers. Members of the scara units were called scariti, escariti and scarii. It is uncertain whether the scara was composed of regular units or an ad hoc force, with members coming from a larger military group.

== Function ==
Although of uncertain composition, the scarae are thought by many modern historians to have been permanently embodied units of elite cavalry, because in the primary sources they are generally described as being tasked to important missions that required mobility. An account also cited that the scara cavalry performed as Charlemagne's bodyguard, securing his rear during campaigns.
