= Medieval European Coinage =

Series of books

Medieval European Coinage 1 The Early Middle Ages (5th-10th centuries), 1986.

Medieval European Coinage is a book series on medieval coins published by Cambridge University Press in association with the Fitzwilliam Museum, Cambridge. The project was the idea of professor Philip Grierson (1910-2006) and Mark Blackburn (1953-2011) was the first general editor. It will cover the coinages of Europe for the period c.450-1500. It has been described as the "first comprehensive survey of European medieval coinages since the Traité de numismatique du moyen âge of Engel and Serrure" (1891-1905).

== Volumes ==
The volumes so far published and announced are:

- 1. The Early Middle Ages (5th-10th Centuries). P. Grierson and M. A. S. Blackburn (published 1986).
- 2. Germany I: Western Germany. P. Ilisch (in preparation).
- 3. Germany II: North-eastern Germany
- 4. Germany III: Central and Southern Germany
- 5 (a). France I: The age of the denier. M. Bompaire (in preparation).
- 5 (b). France II: Later royal and feudal coinages.
- 6. The Iberian Peninsula. M. Crusafont, A. M. Balaguer (published 2013).
- 7 (a) The Low Countries I: The Early Coinage and the Pre-Burgundian South. P. Grierson, P. Spufford and S. Boffa (in preparation).
- 7 (b) The Low Countries II: The North and the Burgundian Period. P. Grierson, P. Spufford and S. Boffa (in preparation).
- 8. Britain and Ireland, c.400-1066. R. Naismith (published 2017).
- 9. (a). British Isles, 1066–1279. M. Allen (in preparation).
- 9. (b). British Isles, 1279–1509.
- 10. The Nordic Countries. J. Steen Jensen and E. Screen (in preparation).
- 11. Hungary and the Balkans. E. Oberländer-Târnoveanu (in preparation).
- 12. Italy I: Northern Italy. W. R. Day Jr., M. Matzke and A. Saccocci (published 2016).
- 13. Italy II: Central Italy. W. R. Day Jr. (in preparation).
- 14. Italy III: South Italy, Sicily, Sardinia. P. Grierson and L. Travaini (published 1998).
- 15. Central and Eastern Europe. B. Paszkiewicz (in preparation).
- 16. The Latin East. J. Baker, R. Kelleher and R. Kool (in preparation).
- 17. Kingdoms of Arles and Lorraine
