= Adalbert, Duke of Alsace =

Adalbert (died 723) was the Duke of Alsace beginning after 683 and probably until his death. He was the second duke of the family of the Etichonids and the first to inherit the duchy from his father.

As the son of Adalrich and Berswinda, Adalbert was created Count of the Sundgau by his father in about 683. It is unknown if Adalbert appointed another count to succeed him after taking over the ducal office, exercised the comital powers himself, or left the office vacant. Under Adalbert, Etichonid control of the offices of the duchy of Alsace and of the monasteries of the region became entrenched.

Adalbert seems to have concentrated his power in northern Alsace (the later Nordgau) around the Diocese of Strasbourg. He founded the convent of Saint Stephen at Strasbourg and installed his daughter Attala as its first abbess. In 722, he established a monastery in honour of the Saint Michael the Archangel on an island in the Rhine north of Strasbourg. This last establishment was co-founded by a group of monks from Ireland led by the first abbot, Benedict. Honau passed to King Theuderic IV on Adalbert's death.

Adalbert's first wife was Gerlinda (perhaps of Aquitaine); his second wife was Ingina, a wealthy woman of Alsace. Adalbert had three daughters: Eugenia, Gundlinda and Attala. The first two entered the nunnery of their aunt Odilia at Hohenburg, where Eugenia eventually succeeded Saint Odile as abbess. Gundlinda was later abbess of Niedermünster. In 845, the Emperor Lothair I confirmed all the charters which Adalbert had granted to his foundation at Strasbourg. Some attribute the daughters to Gerlinda while others attribute them to Ingina. Adalbert had two sons: Liutfrid and Eberhard. Liutfrid made Eberhard a count as early as the 720s. The sons are consistently attributed to Ingina.

== Sources ==
- Bouchard, Constance Brittain (2015). Rewriting Saints and Ancestors: Memory and Forgetting in France, 500-1200. University of Pennsylvania Press.
- Hummer, Hans J. Politics and Power in Early Medieval Europe: Alsace and the Frankish Realm 600 – 1000. Cambridge: Cambridge University Press, 2005. See mainly pp 46–55.
- Dunbar, A. P. C. A Dictionary of Saintly Women, vol 1. London: 1904.
