= Gundelina =

Gundelina (or Gundlinda) (c. 692 – c. 740), abbess, she was the third daughter of Duke Adalbert of Alsace and his first wife Gerlinda. She was the younger sister to saints Attala and Eugenia, both nuns and abbesses, and they were all nieces to the famous blind Saint Odilia, the abbess of Hohenburg.

As a child she was raised by her aunt amongst the nuns at Hohenburg. Later she became a nun herself, and when Odilia founded the abbey of Niedermünster, Gundelina became a nun there (c. 717). With the death of her aunt Gundelina, succeeded her as abbess of Niedermünster (723), whilst her two elder sisters remained at Hohenburg where each served as abbess. At her own death Gundelina was succeeded in office by Werentrude. She was long venerated as a saint, the dates of her commemoration are 28 March and 3 December.
