= Germanus of Granfelden =

First abbot of Moutier-Grandval Monastery

Saint Germanus of Granfelden
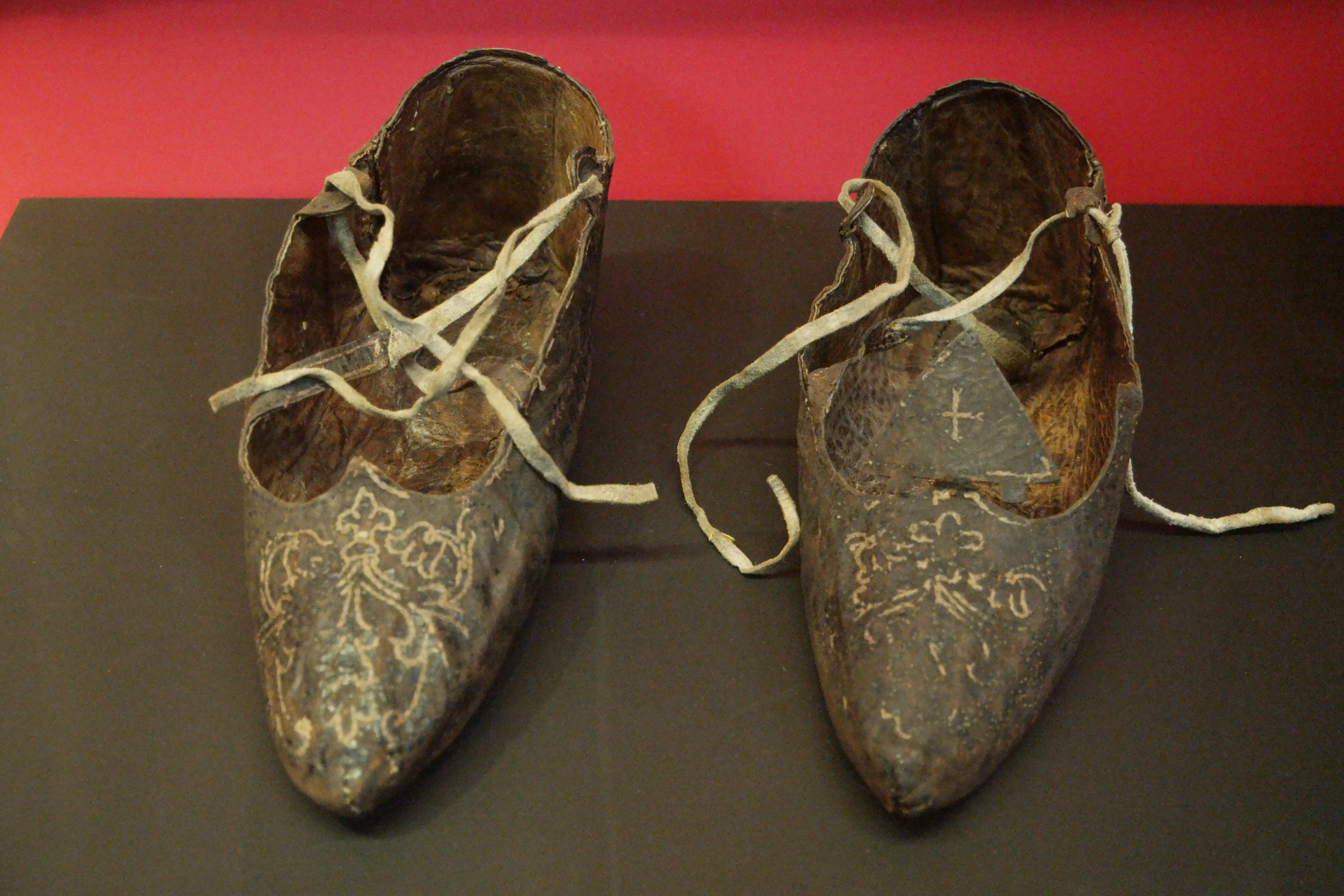
- Shoes of St Germanus of Granfelden at Musée de Cluny -- Musée national du Moyen Âge
- Born: c. 612; Trier
- Died: 675 near Moutier (in the modern-day canton of Bern, Switzerland)
- Venerated in: Catholic Church; Eastern Orthodox Church
- Canonized: Pre-congregation
- Feast: 21 February

Saint Germanus of Granfelden (c. 612 in Trier – 675 near Moutier) was the first abbot of Moutier-Grandval Abbey. He is venerated as a martyr saint in the Catholic and Eastern Orthodox Churches.

== Vita ==
The "Life" of Saint Germanus is recounted in the eleventh-century "Passio sancti Germani", which appears in the Vitae et passiones diversorum sanctorum. It was written about 695 by Bobolène, a priest probably of Moutier-Grandval Abbey and later at Luxeuil. It was composed at the request of the religious brothers Chadoal and Aridius, contemporaries of Abbot Germanus. The manuscript of the Vitae is preserved as the Codex Sangallensis 551 ('Codex of Saint-Gall' 551), housed in the Abbey library of Saint Gall. (Note: Images of the manuscript of Vitae et passiones diversorum sanctorum may be viewed online through the 'e-codices': Virtual Manuscript Library of Switzerland project; link to first page of Vitae shown below: Presbyter Bobulenus, "Passio sancti Germani", Vitae et passiones diversorum sanctorum [Lives and sufferings of the Saints], Codex Sangallensis 551 (in Latin), pp. 106−125, doi:10.5076/e-codices-csg-0551, St. Gallen, Stiftsbibliothek (Abbey library of Saint Gall))

== Life ==
Germanus was the second son of Optardus, a wealthy senator in Trier. His older brother became a courtier, while his younger brother Numerianus eventually succeeded Modoald as Bishop of Trier.

Optardus entrusted the young Germanus to Modoald to be educated. At the age of seventeen, Germanus decided to take up the monastic life. He left to join Arnulf of Metz, who had retired from the bishopric of Metz to a hermitage at a mountain site in his domains in the Vosges to become a monk.

Germanus stayed for some time with Arnulf who gave him the tonsure and then sent him, with his younger brother Numerian who had come to join him, to the recently founded monastery Remiremont monastery. Driven by a desire for greater perfection, he left with his brother and some religious for Luxeuil. Abbot Waldebert received him, conferred on him the priesthood, then around 640 sent him to organize and govern the monastery of Granfeld (Monasterium Grandis Vallis) or Moutier-Granval, recently founded by Gundoin, Duke of Alsace. Germanus served as abbot for 35 years. His history with Remiremont, Luxeuil, and Granval shows his connection to the network of Columbanian establishments. His contacts with Modoald, Arnulf, and Gundoin suggest he supported the Arnulfings.

According to legend, Gundoin's successor, Boniface, Duke of Alsace had trouble keeping the people of the Sornegau from revolting. The situation became worse under his successor Adalrich, Duke of Alsace (known as "Eticho"), who wanted to subdue the area around Delémont. Germanus and his prior Randoald of Grandval met him for negotiations near Courtételle (southwest of Delémont). After discussions Germanus and Randoald were slain on their way back by supporters of the Duke. The following night the religious collected the bodies and buried them first in Saint-Ursanne, then in Moutier-Granval.

== Veneration ==
Germanus and Randoald are regarded as martyrs and became very popular. Miracles reportedly took place at their tomb, which became a center of pilgrimage. The remains of the martyrs were then in 1477 transferred under the high altar. Their cult extended throughout the diocese of Basel and throughout the province of Besancon. The progress of Protestantism and a fire at the abbey which had become a collegiate church, of which nothing remains, led the canons to withdraw and transport the relics of the two saints to Délémont in the canton of Jura, where they continue to be venerated. The cult of Saint Germanus is still alive in the Catholic canton of Jura, where many churches are dedicated to him.

His feast day, shared with Randoald, is 21 February. The crosier of Germanus, one of the oldest remaining, is kept at Musée jurassien d'art et d'histoire in Delémont.
