= Herrad of Landsberg =

Alsatian nun, abbess, and author (12th-century)

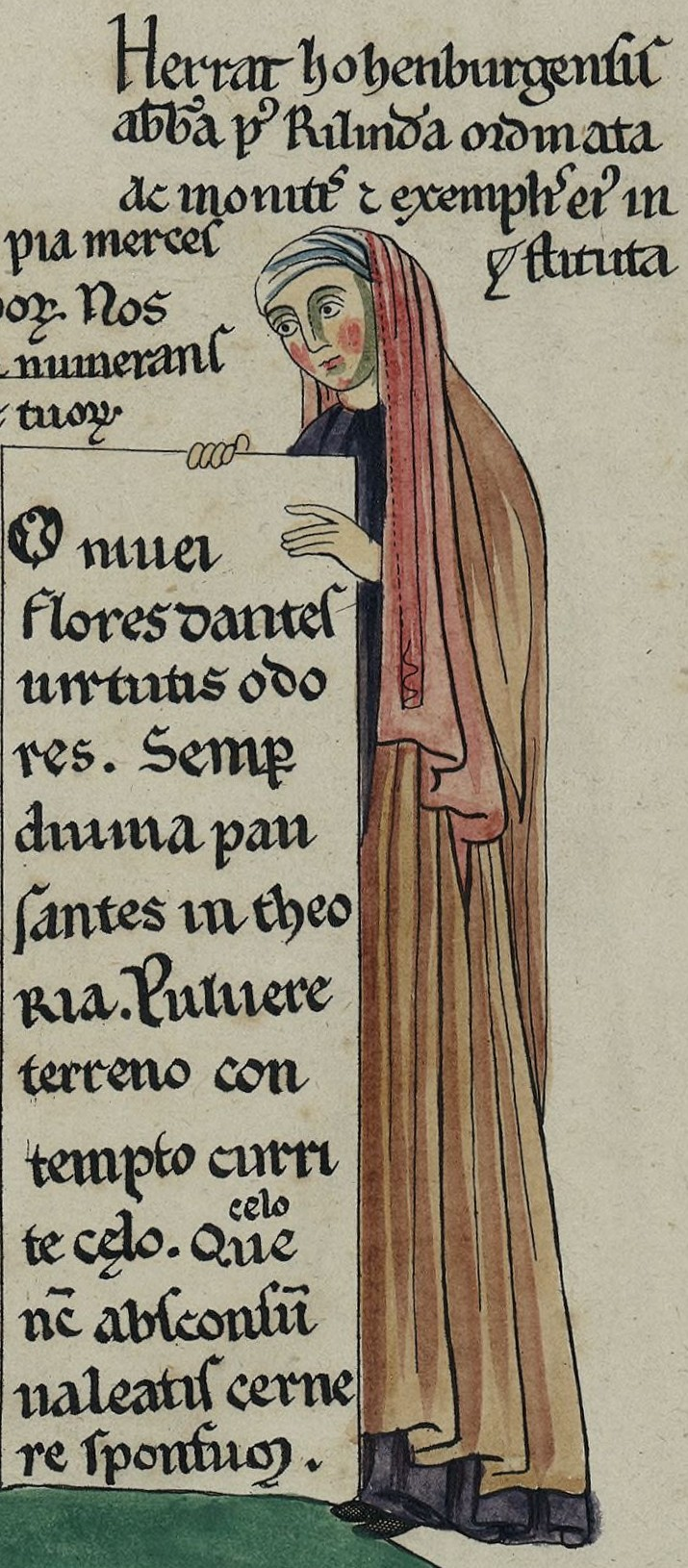
Herrad of Landsberg Selfportrait from Hortus deliciarum, c. 1180. The description in Latin reads: "Herrat hohenburgensis abbatissa post Rilindam ordinata ac monitis et exemplis eius instituta". These are the initial words of the description from the last miniature (fol. 322–323) of the Hortus deliciarum.

Herrad of Landsberg (Latin: Herrada Landsbergensis; c. 1130 – July 25, 1195) was a 12th-century Alsatian nun and abbess of Hohenburg Abbey in the Vosges mountains. She was known as the author of the pictorial encyclopedia Hortus deliciarum (The Garden of Delights).

== Life at the Abbey ==
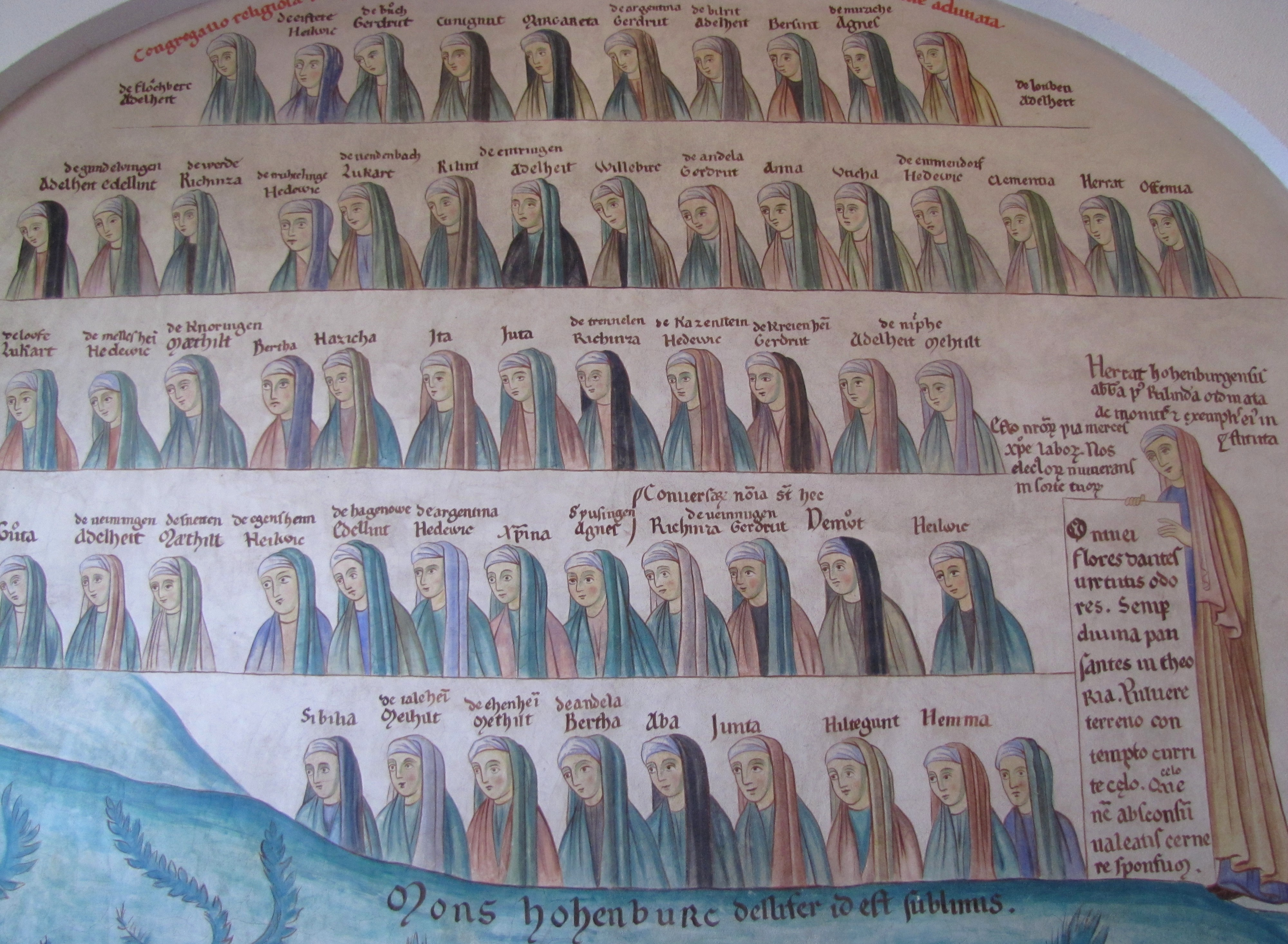
Wall painting depicting nuns of Hohenburg Abbey. The Latin inscription reads: "Mons Hohenburc dellifer (sic) id est sublimus". (Note: Most likely dellifer is an erroneous spelling of bellifer.) Herrad is featured on the right side.

Born about 1130 at the castle of Landsberg, the seat of a noble Alsatian family, she entered Hohenburg Abbey in the Vosges mountains, about fifteen miles from Strasbourg, at an early age. Hohenburg Abbey, also known as Mont St Odile, was run by Abbess Relinda, a nun sent from the Benedictine monastery of Bergen in Bavaria. Due to her support from the Holy Roman Emperor Frederick Barbarossa the abbey was extremely successful and powerful, as well as a source for reform. At the abbey Herrad received the most comprehensive education available to women during the 12th century. As she grew older she rose to a high position in office at the abbey, and was soon put in charge of governing and educating her fellow nuns. After Relinda's death, Herrad was elected abbess in 1167.

As abbess, Herrad worked on rebuilding the monastery, as well as consolidating the land surrounding the monastery under its ownership. She proved herself to be a capable and well-loved abbess, and it was at this time that she began her work on the Hortus Deliciarum. Herrad was abbess for 28 years, and continued in that office until her death in 1195. Adelhaid of Faimingen was her successor.

== Hortus deliciarum ==
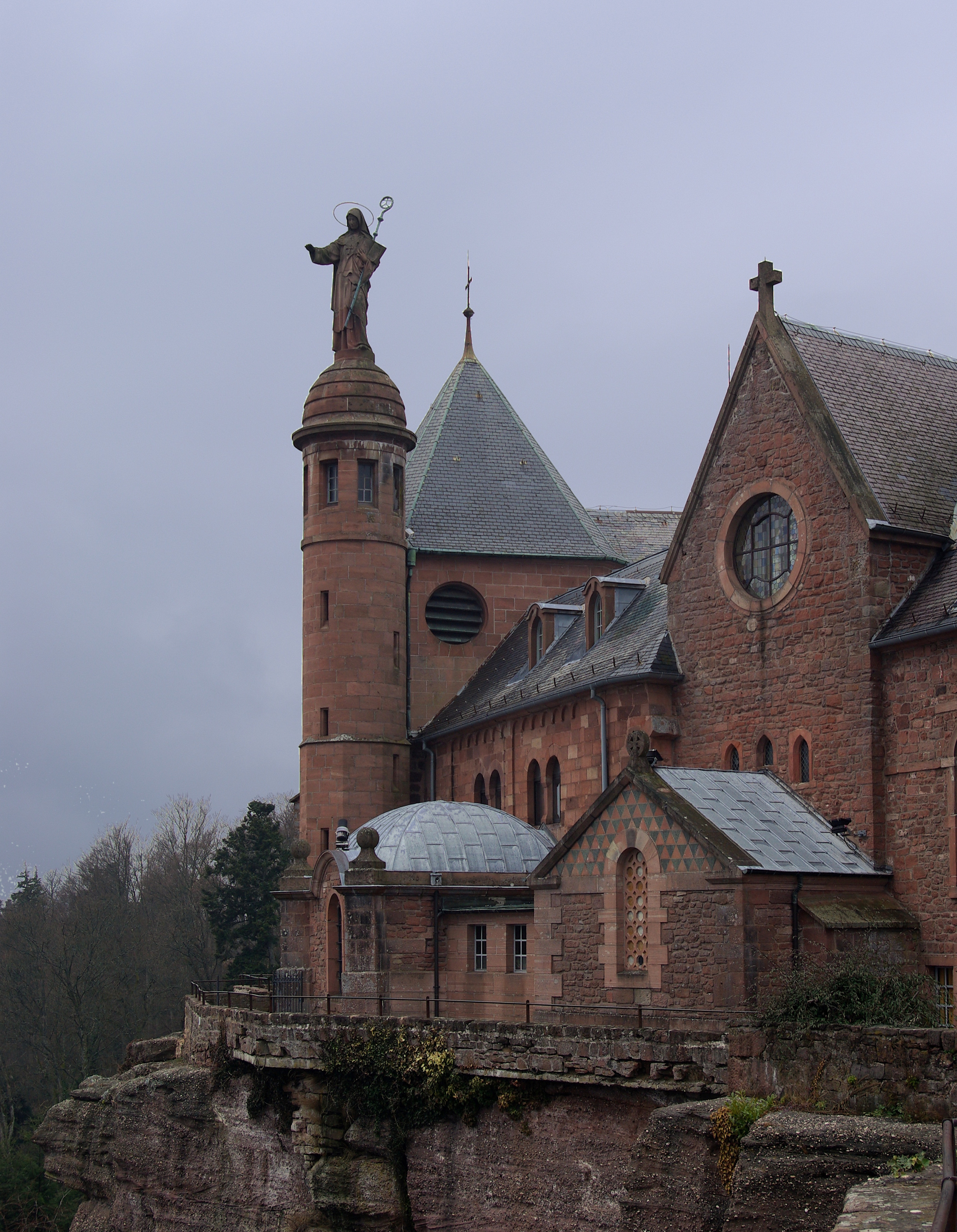
Hohenburg Abbey at the Mont St Odile

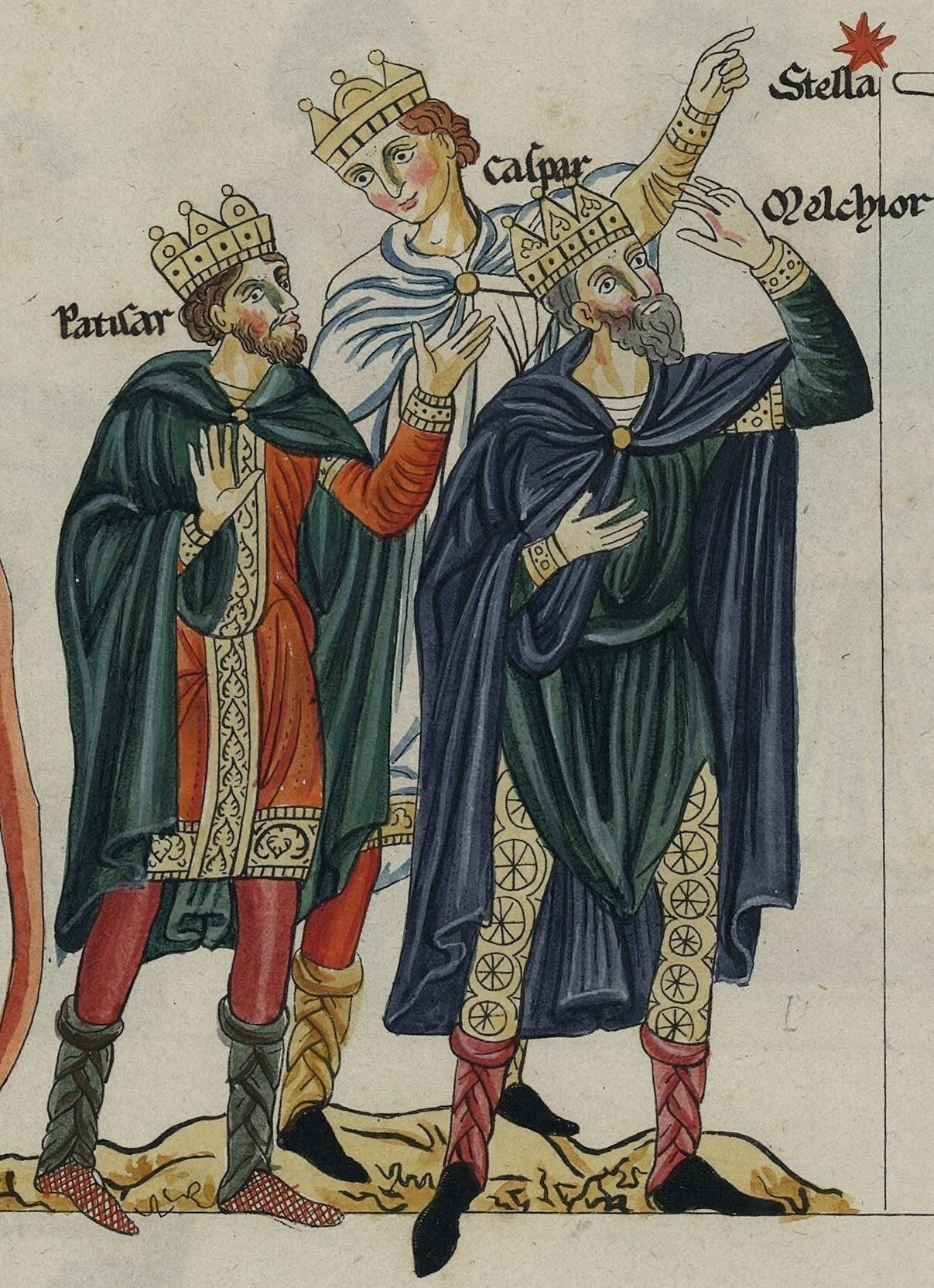
The Three Magi, an illustration from the reproductions of the Hortus deliciarum by Christian Moritz Engelhardt, 1818

As early as 1159 Herrad had begun within the cloister walls the work for which she is best known, the Hortus deliciarum, a compendium of all the sciences studied at that time. It was written for the women in Herrad's convent, in order to further the teaching of biblical, moral, and theological material, and was completed in 1185. In it, Herrad delves into the battle of Virtue and Vice with vivid visual imagery preceding the text.

The original manuscript consisted of 648 pages on 324 parchment sheets. The majority of the work is written in Latin, with approximately 1250 glosses in German. The work shows a wide range of reading. Its chief claim to distinction is the 336 illustrations which adorn the text. Many of these are symbolical representations of theological, philosophical, and literary themes; some are historical, some represent scenes from the actual experience of the artist, and one is a collection of portraits of her sisters in religion. The technique has been very much admired and in almost every instance they show an artistic imagination which is rare in Herrad's contemporaries.

While other artists and writers contributed to the Hortus deliciarum, it was largely compiled, written, and edited by Herrad. Many of the poems and hymns were written by Herrad, and it is speculated that much of the art was created under the direction of Herrad as well.

After having been preserved for centuries at Hohenburg Abbey, the manuscript of Hortus deliciarum passed into the municipal library of Strasbourg about the time of the French Revolution. There the miniatures were copied by Christian Moritz Engelhardt and published by Cotta in Stuttgart in 1818. The text was copied and published by Straub and Keller between 1879 and 1899 including some coloured copies from Herrad's illustrations made by Wilhelm Stengel. Thus, although the original perished in the burning of the libraries of the Protestant seminary and the city of Strasbourg during the Siege of Strasbourg in 1870 in the Franco-Prussian War, we can still form an estimate of the artistic and literary value of Herrad's work.

== See also ==
- Women artists
- Hildegard von Bingen
- Hrotsvitha of Gandersheim
