= Honau Abbey =

Monastic foundation

The Abbey of Honau was a monastic foundation in Northern Alsace which flourished from the 8th century until 1290, when it succumbed to the flood-waters of the Rhine.

The Abbey was founded by Irish and Scottish monks at the beginning of the 8th century, on an island in the Rhine close to the present day village of La Wantzenau (and Honau, which is part of Rheinau), which was later built on Abbey lands. The first abbot was Benedict (alias Benoît).

In 720, Duke Adalbert of Alsace, the brother of Saint Odile, built a new abbey for the monks, just four years after he had built the Abbey of St Stephen in Strasbourg. The Abbey was dedicated to Saint Michael the Archangel, a popular saint at the time, as can be testified by the establishment of the abbeys of Mont St Michel in Normandy and Saint Mihiel in Lorraine in the same period.

On Adalbert's death in 723, the abbey passed to King Theuderic IV. The abbey continued to benefit from numerous generous donations. Benedict, who was still living in 726, eventually resigned as abbot and chose Tuban as his successor. Tuban is mentioned in several records of donations to the Abbey (Grandidier, op.cit.).

The subsequent abbots were Etienne, followed by Beatus. In 776 the Abbot Beatus is mentioned in a Charter from Charlemagne, referring to him as bishop and confirming that the Abbey would continue to be administered by Irish monks (Grandidier, op.cit.). According to Grandidier, the number of monks increased considerably during the time of Beatus and monks were sent out to found other churches and monasteries, including those at Luttenbach, in Alsace Aschaffenburg in Germany and Munster in Switzerland, all of which depended on Honau. Beatus was succeeded as Abbot by Edigan, who in turn was succeeded by Thomas. The first five abbots were all referred to as saints in the calendar of Saint Pierre le Vieux in Strasbourg, which, at the time of Grandidier, still claimed to hold relics of all five.

Although some writers claim the Abbey as a Benedictine foundation, this is disputed by Hunkler, who argues that it has not proved possible to associate the abbey to any particular monastic order.

Several of the early abbots had the title bishop, leading to speculation that the abbey was the seat of a bishopric, but it is more probable that they were regional bishops. In the 11th century, the Abbey became secularised, a chapter was created (Hunkler, op. cit.)

In 1290, the Abbey was abandoned, when the island was threatened by floodwaters. On 7 September 1290 Conrad de Lichtenberg, the Bishop of Strasbourg, transferred the Chapter to Rhinau, where a new Abbey was built, this too on an island in the Rhine. The same fate befell this second Abbey, which was abandoned in 1398 due to flooding. The Chapter then moved to Strasbourg on 22 May 1398, where the canons were permitted to practice their liturgy in the church of Saint Pierre le Vieux (Hunkler, op. cit.). They stayed there until 1790, when the Chapter was wound up, apart from the period 1529 to 1683 when, because of the Reform, they were not allowed to use the Church.

== The cartulary of Honau ==
The now lost cartulary of Honau, written in 1079, and described by a 17th-century Jesuit, recorded over a thousand charters from the foundation of the abbey until the time of Charlemagne. Some of these are listed in Bishop Reeves' article.
