= Relindis of Hohenburg =

Relindis (Rilint, Regilindis) was abbess of Hohenburg Abbey from the 1140s or 1150s until her death on 22 August 1167. She was the predecessor of Herrad of Landsberg. She had been abbess at Bergen, Neuburg before she was called to Hohenburg by Frederick I to re-establish the monastery after it had fallen into decay. She introduced the Rule of St. Augustine at Hohenburg and initiated a period of intellectual productivity. Identity with a nun called Regilind from Admont has been suggested.
