= Gundoin, Duke of Alsace =

7th century Frankish nobleman

Gundoin was the first Duke of Alsace in the middle of the seventh century. He was a Frankish nobleman from the Meuse-Moselle basin. He was, according to the author of the Vita Sadalbergae, an "illustrious man (vir inluster), opulent in wealth and fame according to the highest secular dignity and skilled in courtly affairs."

Gundoin's duchy comprised both sides of the Vosges, the Burgundian Gate, and the Transjura. It was probably created by Dagobert I in order to defend southern Austrasia from the Alemanni and to assert Austrasian claims to the region in the face of Burgundian opposition. In 596, Childebert II bequeathed Alsace to his son Theuderic II, who was raised there. This attached it to Burgundy, but in 610 Theudebert II, Theuderic's brother of Austrasia, forced Alsace' cession to him only to lose it two years later to Burgundy again. In 623, when Chlothar II granted Austrasia to Dagobert, he excluded Alsace, the Vosges, and the Ardennes, but was shortly after forced to concede it to Dagobert by the Austrasian nobility. The rule of a Frank from the Austrasian heartland tied Alsace more closely to the Austrasian court. By some accounts, Gundoin even lived in "Meuse", a villa at the headwaters of the Meuse and may have been a royal courtier. He did have problems retaining the faithfulness of the Sundgau.

By his wife Saratrude he had five children, including Leduin Bodo, Bishop of Toul; Sadalberga; and a son named Fulculf Bodo. According to the Vitae Columbani of Jonas of Bobbio, Sadalberga was born blind before being healed by Eustasius of Luxeuil. Between 629 and 631, Gundoin removed Sadalberga, already a widow, from her convent of Remiremont and sought to marry her to a courtier of Dagobert I, Balduin Baso, at the king's insistence.

During the tenure of Waldebert of Luxeuil, Gundoin granted property in the Giura valley to the Abbey of Luxeuil to found a daughter house at Grandval (Grandisvallis). The monks, under Germanus, built a monastery and cleared an old Roman road which lay on the shortest route from Basel to Biel. Gundoin probably intended to link his duchy with the region of the Aar and extend his authority as far as Lake Thun. He probably also wished to better impose himself on the Sornegau.

Gundoin died and was succeeded by Boniface, according to Bobolenus. This has led to him being called the first of a line of dukes ruling Alsace for the next century; the later dukes of Alsace did consider him a predecessor. Gundoin has controversially been identified with Gunzo, a duke in the region around Lake Constance with his seat at Überlingen, who betrothed his daughter to Sigebert III. Gunzo's men escorted the woman as far as the Rhine, which would imply that Gunzo's authority ended there, whereas the region over which Gundoin ruled lay in Alsace on the opposite side of the river.

== Sources ==
- Hummer, Hans J. Politics and Power in Early Medieval Europe: Alsace and the Frankish Realm 600 – 1000. Cambridge University Press: 2005.
- Borgolte, Michael. "Gundoin." Historical Dictionary of Switzerland. 2005. Italiano, Français, and Deutsch.
- Geuenich, Dieter. "Gundoinus." Geschichte der Alemannen. Kohlhammer Verlag, 1997. pp 99, 102, 158.
