= Moutier-Grandval Abbey =

Former Benedictine Abbey

Coordinates: 47.280545°N 7.37201°E

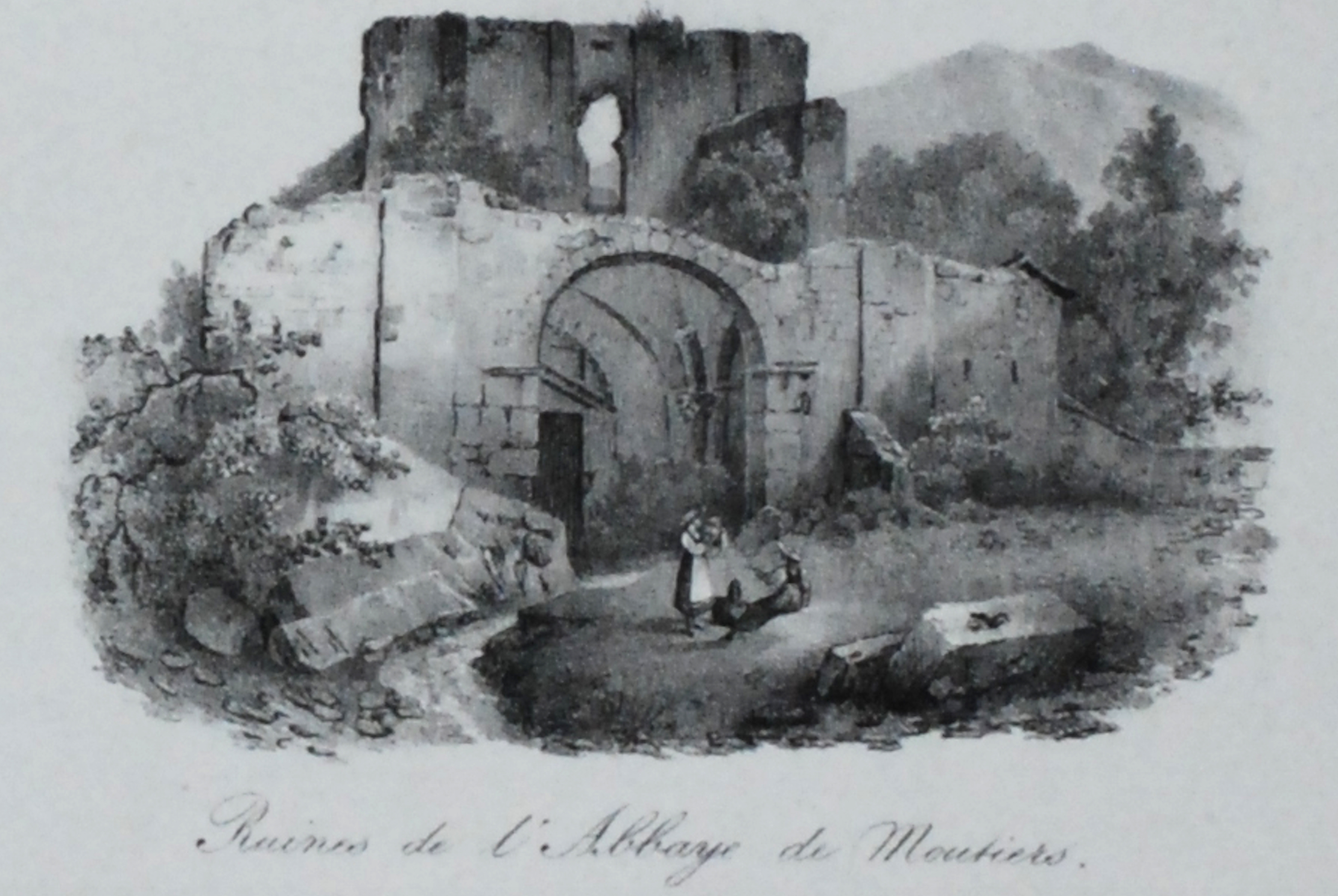
Ruins of the Moutier Abbey, circa 1830s, by Godefroy Engelmann

Moutier-Grandval Abbey was a Benedictine abbey near the villages of Moutier and Grandval in today's Bernese Jura, Canton of Bern in Switzerland. It was founded around 640, when Grandval already existed; Moutier grew up around the abbey.

== History ==
The abbey was founded as a dependency of Luxeuil Abbey, on land granted by Gundoin, Duke of Alsace on the old route leading to the Pierre Pertuis Pass. The abbot of Luxeuil, Saint Waldebert, sent Saint Germanus of Granfelden, who served 35 years as the first abbot, with Saint Randoald of Grandval as his prior. Both were martyred in 675 by Adalrich, Duke of Alsace after they protested against his expulsion of the population of the Sorgenau valley. The abbey became, like some others, the secular ruler of a local territory, and by the 9th or 10th century had property and influence all the way to Lake Biel and into the Balsthal valley, but was regarded as a fief of the king of Burgundy. There was to be a long history of disputes over the property and privileges of the abbey, which later fell under the Dukes of Burgundy, who provided lay abbots, the priors or provosts being the senior monks. In 968 Conrad of Burgundy granted the abbey "in benefice" to Count Luitfrid, who then divided the property among his sons as though it had been granted in proprium, as property. After a court case it was returned to the king. In 999, Rudolph III of Burgundy presented the bishop of Basel with the abbey and its 540 square miles of lands, establishing the Prince-Bishopric of Basel as a secular territory; disputes with the Prince-bishops were to continue. According to legend, Bellelay Abbey was founded as a dependency in 1136, but as this belonged to the new Premonstratensian order the story seems unlikely. The abbey owned Corgémont, Tavannes and Perrefitte and other properties. From 1486 the abbey was also part of the Protectorate of Bern in the Old Swiss Confederacy, while remaining subject to Basel. From 1475 the Alsatian-born chronicler Johann Burchard, living in Rome, was provost.

After the Swiss Reformation, the monks fled to Delémont, and between 1534 and 1792 the parish church there also served as their church. The arrival of French Revolutionary armies in 1792 ended both abbey and Prince-bishopric, and the buildings of the abbey have now disappeared, although some 12th century remains of buildings were discovered under the town in 2008. However the small chapelle de Chalière, now serving as the cemetery chapel at Perrefitte, is a Carolingian building with faded 11th century wall-paintings that was built by the abbey. The major relics of the abbey were taken to Delémont at the Reformation, and the church there still has the bodies of Saints Germanus and Randoald, while the museum has Germanus's reputed cross (metal and enamel over wood, perhaps 9th century on older wood), sandals, and chalice (13th century, silver-gilt).

=== Moutier-Grandval Bible ===
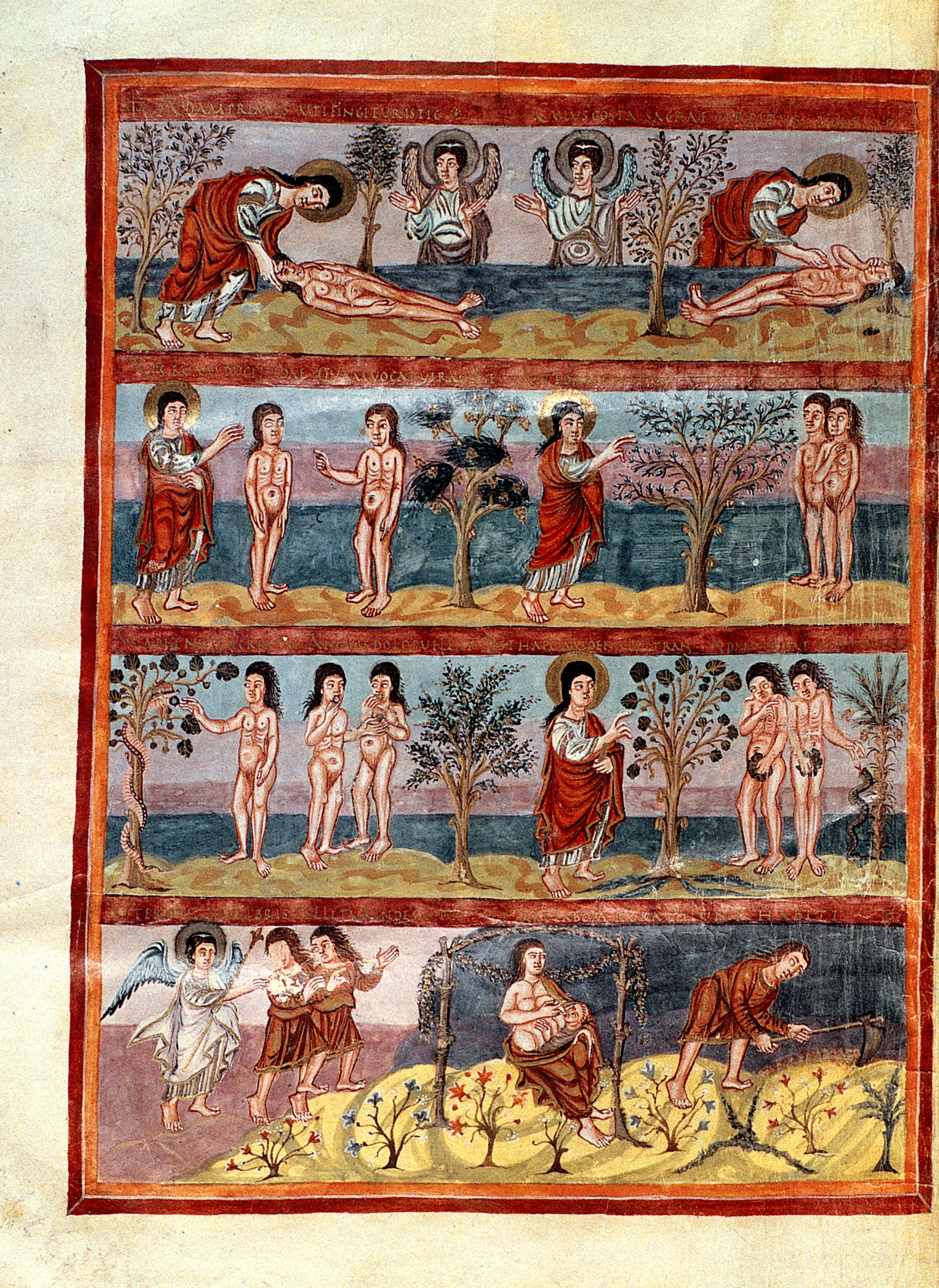
Moutier-Grandval Bible, c. 840; the story of Adam and Eve from the Book of Genesis

The Moutier-Grandval Bible is an illuminated manuscript bible of about 840, which was probably written in Tours, France, perhaps specially for the abbey. It was owned by them until the dissolution in the French Revolutionary Wars, when it was apparently forgotten and found in Delémont by children. It is now in the British Library Add MS 10546. There are three full pages with miniatures, two showing scenes from the Book of Genesis: the story of Adam and Eve over several registers like a "strip cartoon", Moses receiving the Tablets of the Law and teaching them to the Israelites in two scenes, and an allegorical page with two scenes at the end of the book. A facsimile was published in 1971 (Die Bibel von Moutier-Grandval, ed. J. Duft, Bern 1971).
