= Hortus deliciarum =

12th century illuminated medieval encyclopedia compiled by Herrad of Landsberg

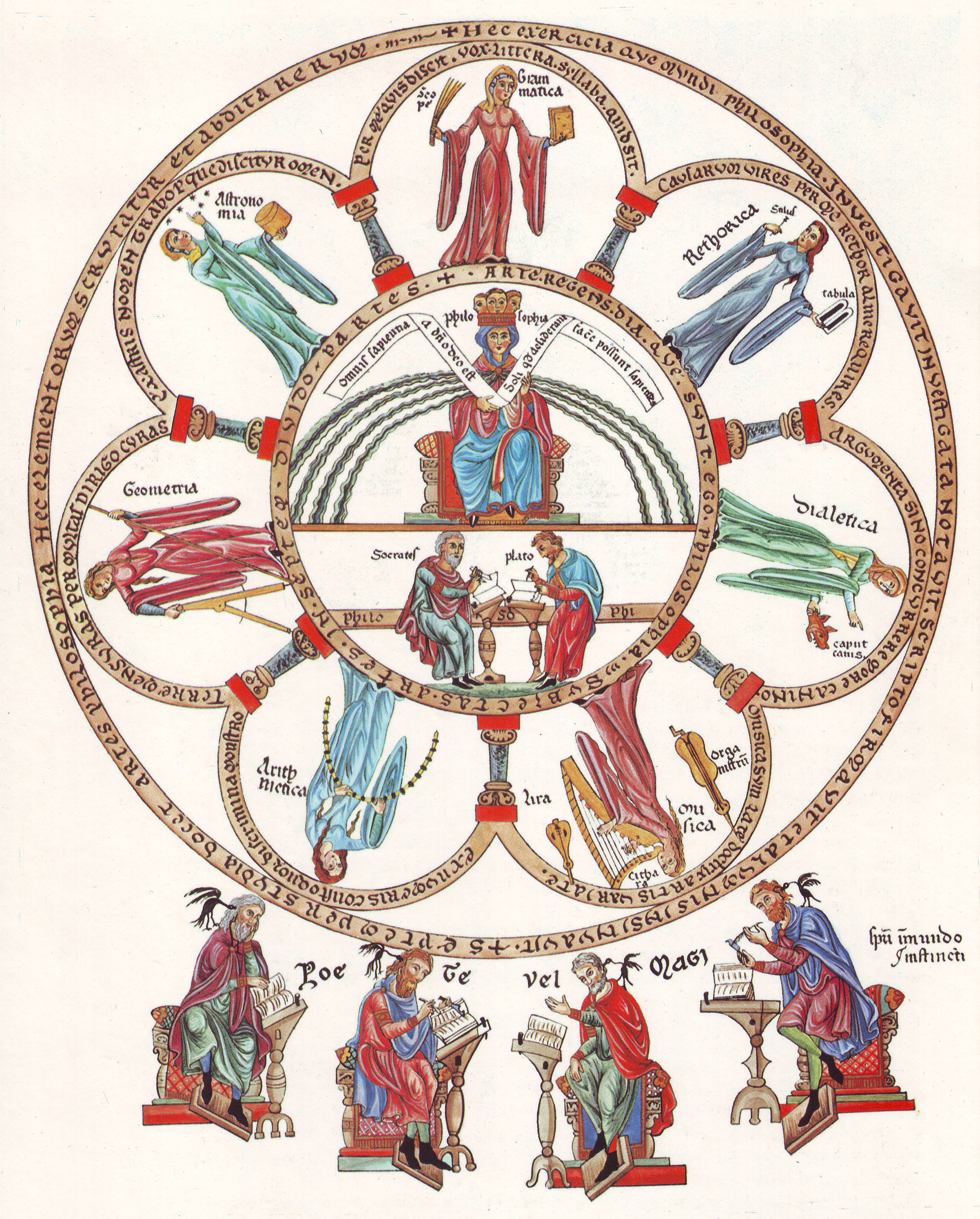
Philosophia et septem artes liberales (Philosophy and the Seven Liberal Arts), as illustrated in the Hortus deliciarum. (Description of the illumination)

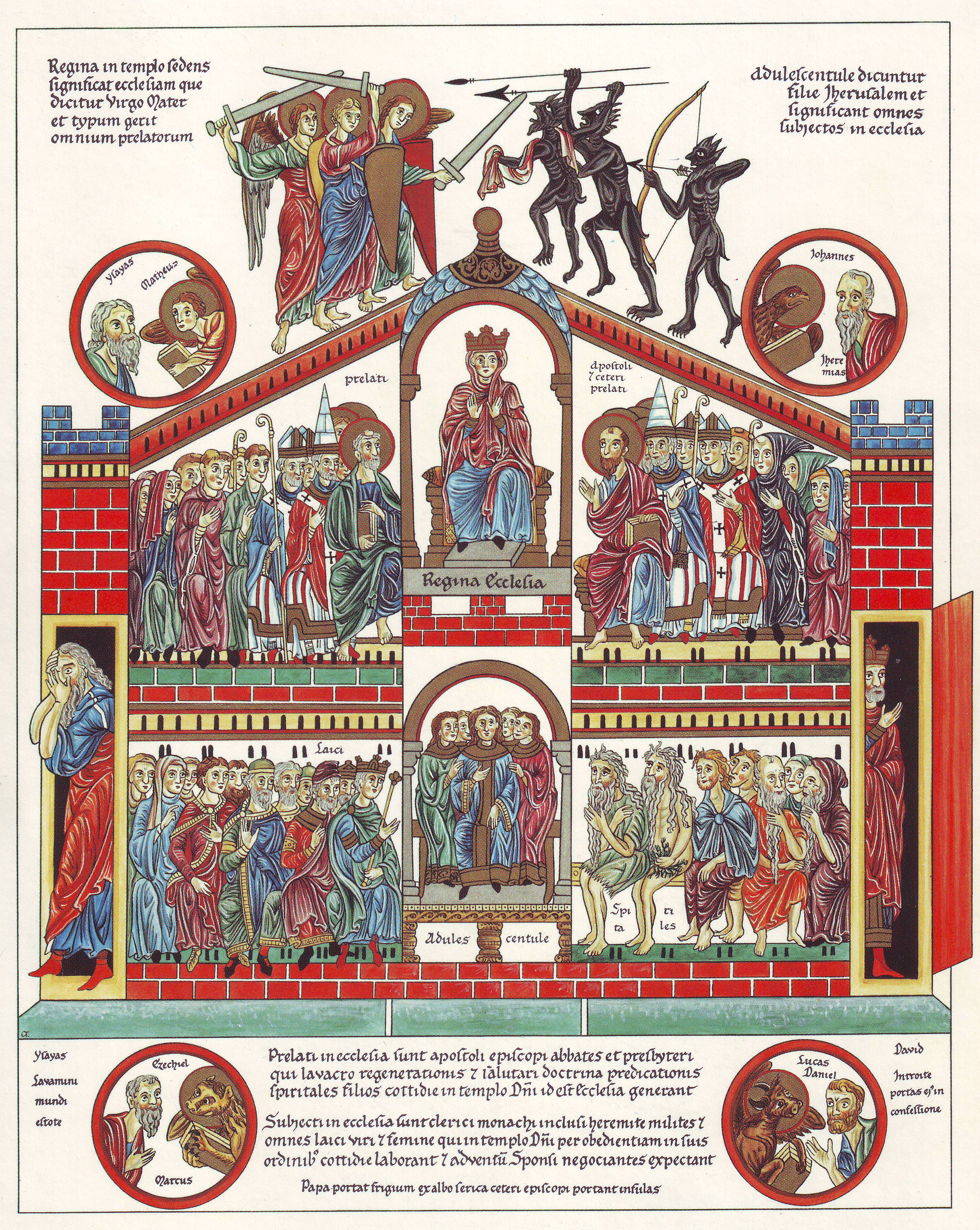
An illustration of the ecclesia from the Hortus deliciarum

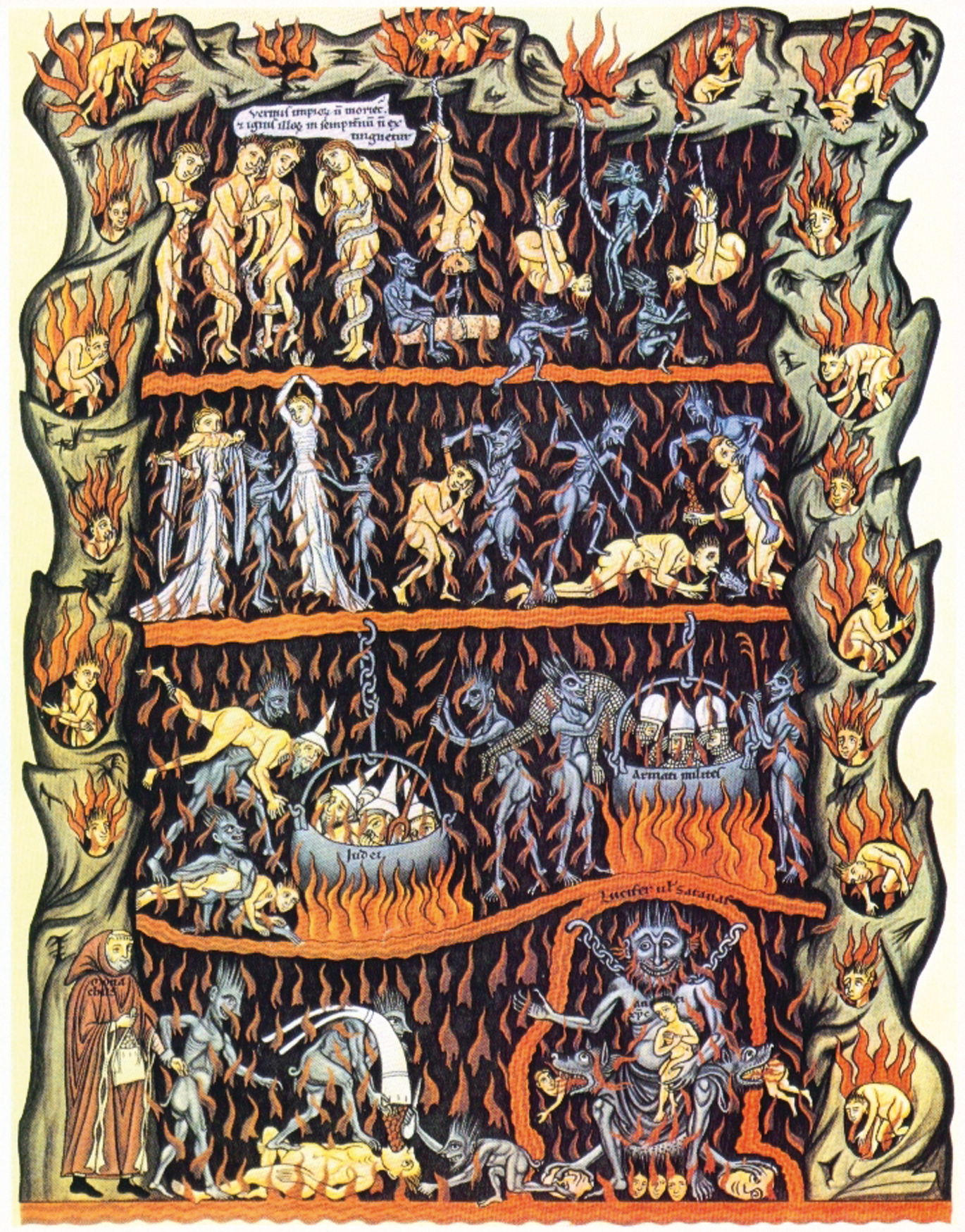
Hell, as illustrated in the Hortus deliciarum. The Devil can be seen at bottom right.

The Hortus deliciarum (Latin for Garden of Delights) was a medieval pictorial encyclopedia compiled by the nun Herrad of Landsberg at the Hohenburg Abbey in Alsace, better known today as Mont Sainte-Odile.

== Description ==
The Hortus deliciarum is one of the first sources of polyphony originating from a convent. The manuscript contained at least 20 song texts, all of which were originally notated with music. Those that can be recognized now are from the conductus repertory, and are mainly note against note in texture. The notation was in semi-quadratic neumes with pairs of four-line staves. Two songs survive with music intact: Primus parens hominum, a monophonic song, and a two-part work, Sol oritur occasus.

== History and content ==
It was an illuminated encyclopedia, begun in 1167 as a pedagogical tool for young novices at the convent. It is the first encyclopedia that was evidently written by a woman. It was finished in 1185, and was one of the most celebrated illuminated manuscripts of the period. The majority of the work is in Latin, with glosses in German. Most of the manuscript was not original, but a compendium of 12th-century knowledge. The manuscript contained poems, illustrations, and music, and drew from texts by classical and Arab writers. Interspersed with writings from other sources were poems by Herrad, addressed to the nuns, almost all of which were set to music. The most famous portion of the manuscript is its 336 illustrations, which depicted theological, philosophical, and literary themes amongst others. These works are well regarded.

In 1870, the manuscript was burnt and destroyed when the library at Temple Neuf in Strasbourg was bombarded during the German Siege of Strasbourg. It is possible to reconstruct parts of the manuscript because portions of it had been copied in various sources; Christian Maurice Engelhardt copied the miniatures in 1818, and the text was copied and published by Straub and Keller between 1879 and 1899.
