= Hector of Provence =

Hector (died 679) was the Patrician of Provence in the 660s and 670s. He intervened in the wars between Leodegar and Ebroin in Burgundy on behalf of the former, as recorded in the Passio Leudegarii. When he died, Eticho invaded Provence and tried to take Lyon, unsuccessfully.

== Sources ==
- Lewis, Archibald R. "The Dukes in the Regnum Francorum, A.D. 550-751." Speculum, Vol. 51, No 3 (July 1976), pp 381–410.
