= Château du Landsberg =

Castle in Bas-Rhin, Alsace, France

Coordinates: 48°25′14″N 7°25′21″E

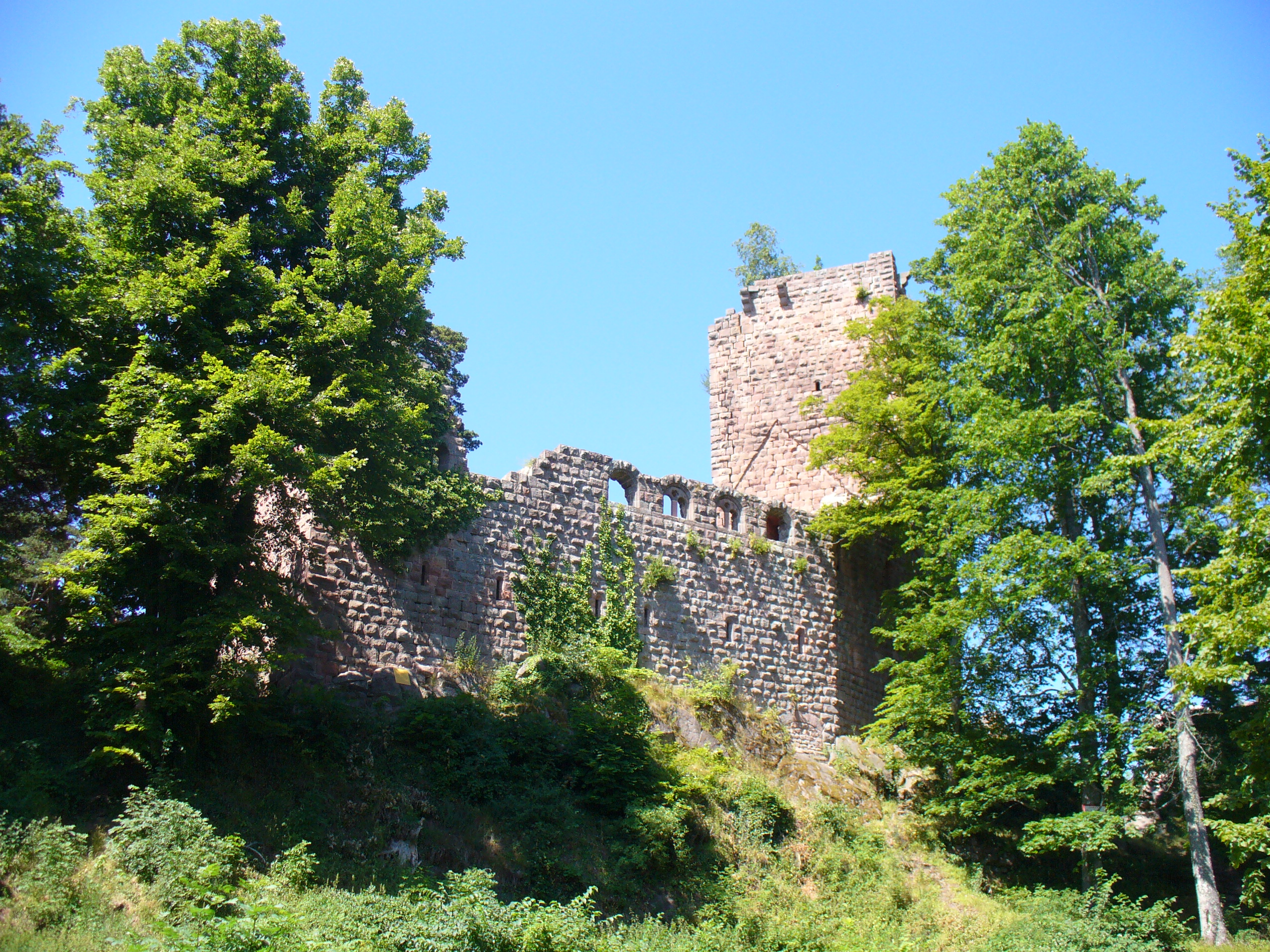
Château du Landsberg

The Château du Landsberg is a castle in the commune of Heiligenstein in the Bas-Rhin département in Alsace, France.

The castle includes a Zwinger with two sets of defensive walls. Construction dates from the 12th, 13th and 15th centuries. The land belonged to the Abbey of Niedersmunster.

The castle is privately owned. It has been listed since 1965 as a monument historique by the French Ministry of Culture.

== History ==
The central part of the castle was built in the late 12th century, and the newer outer castle added onto at the start of the 13th century by Conrad de Landsberg to provide defence for the abbeys of Mont Sainte-Odile, Niedermunster, Truttenhausen and Andlau. More recent additions were made in the 15th century. Herrad of Landsberg was born here around 1130.

== Images ==
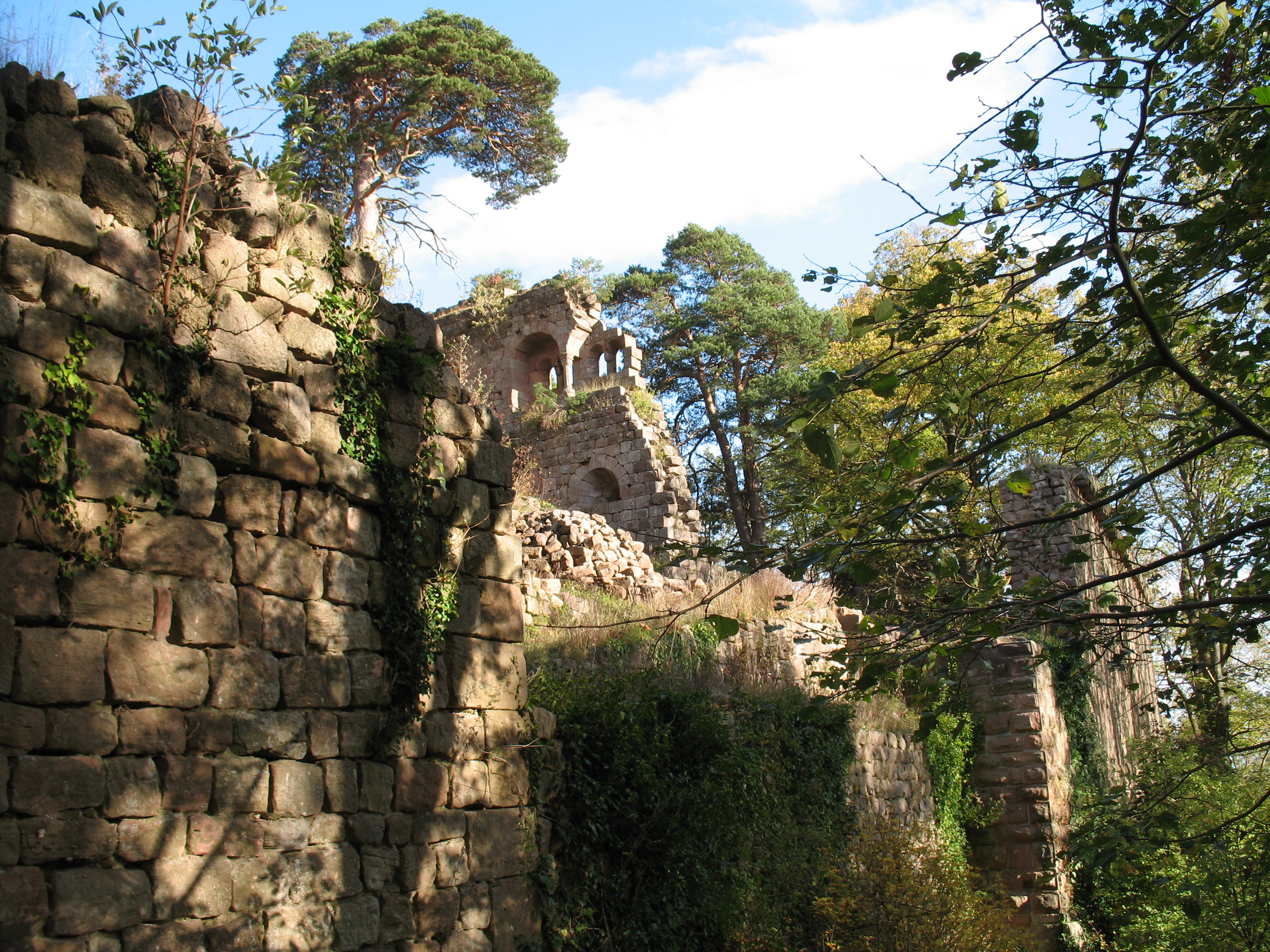
Interior

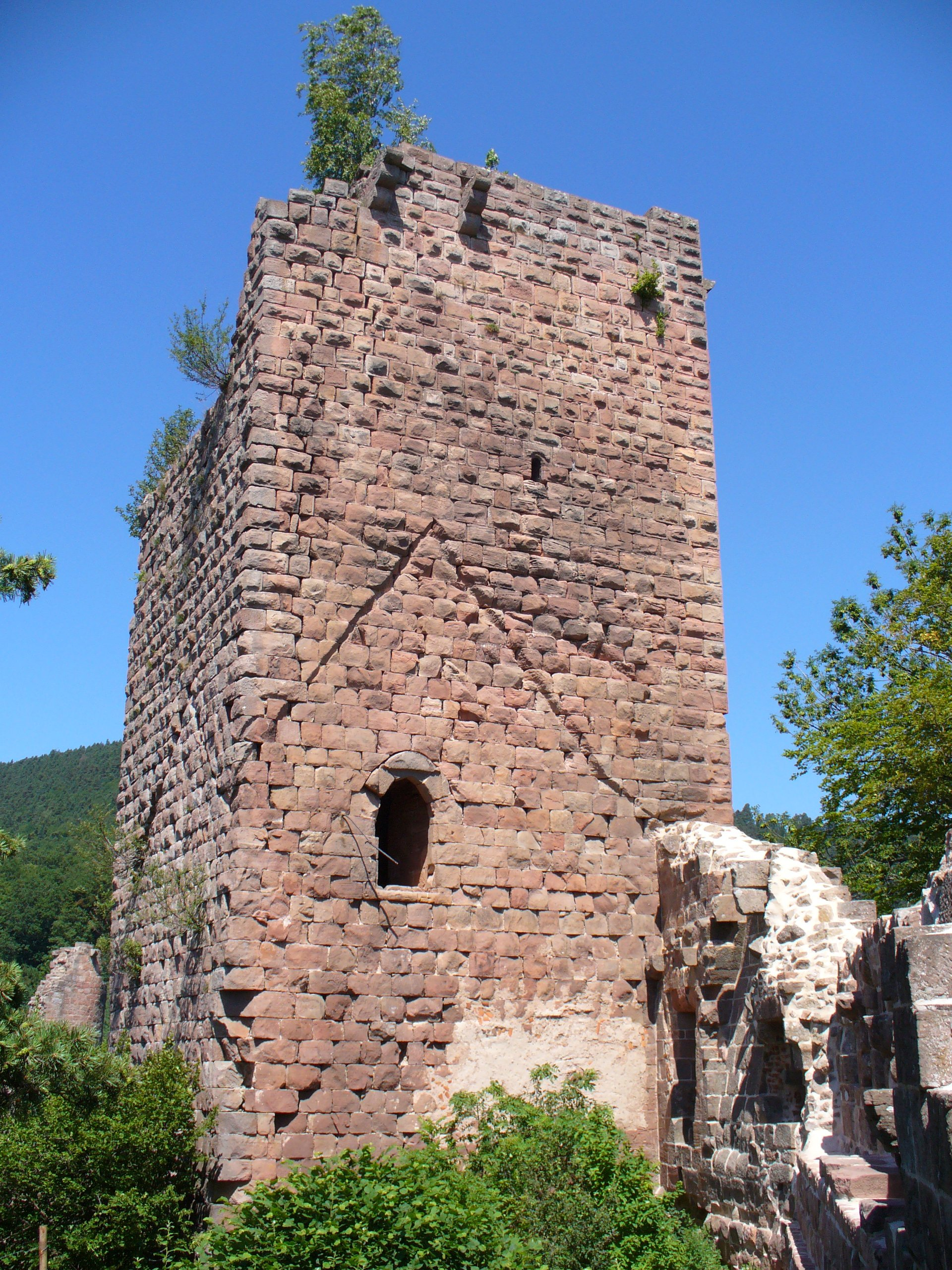
The square keep

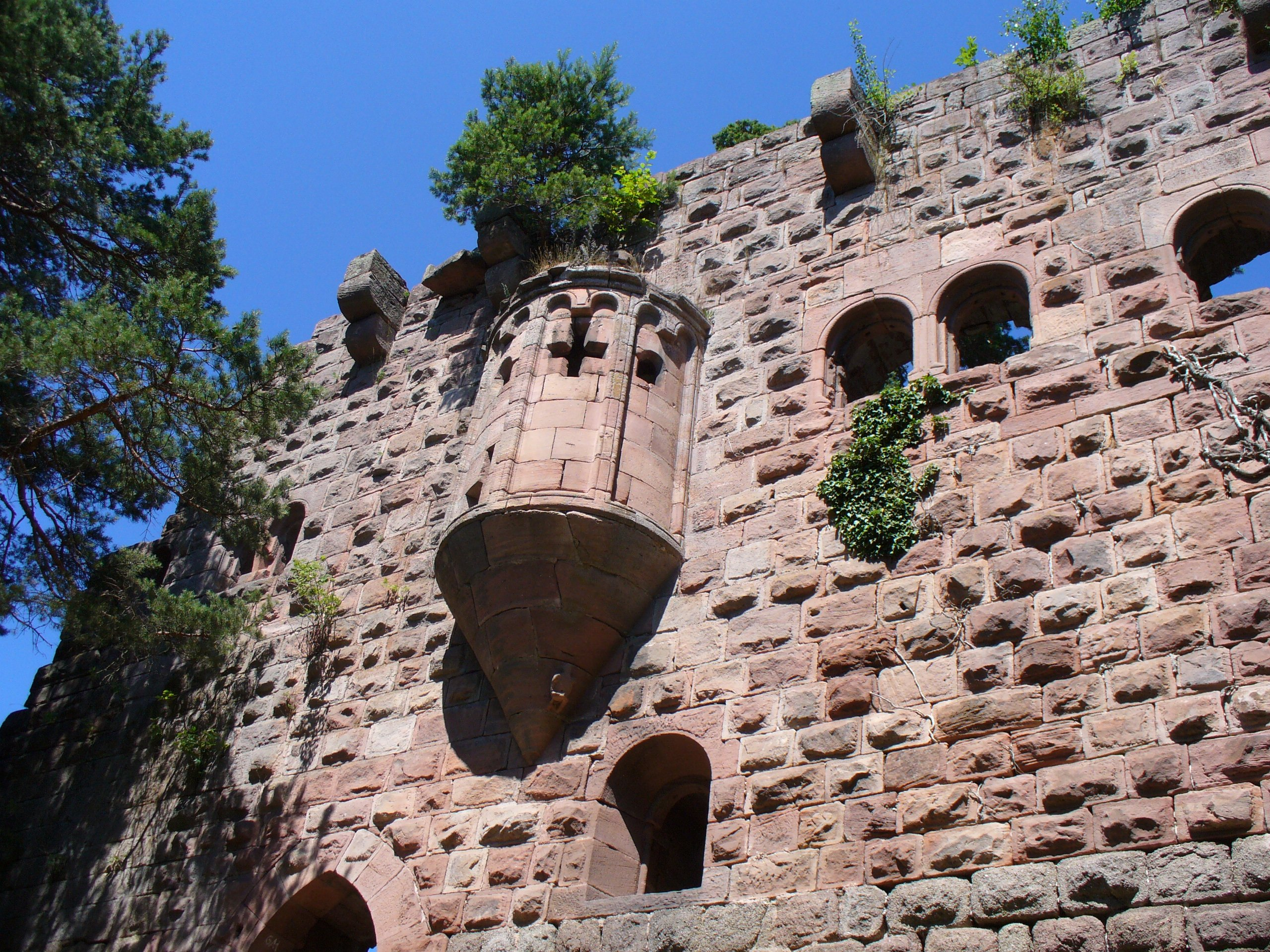
Oriel

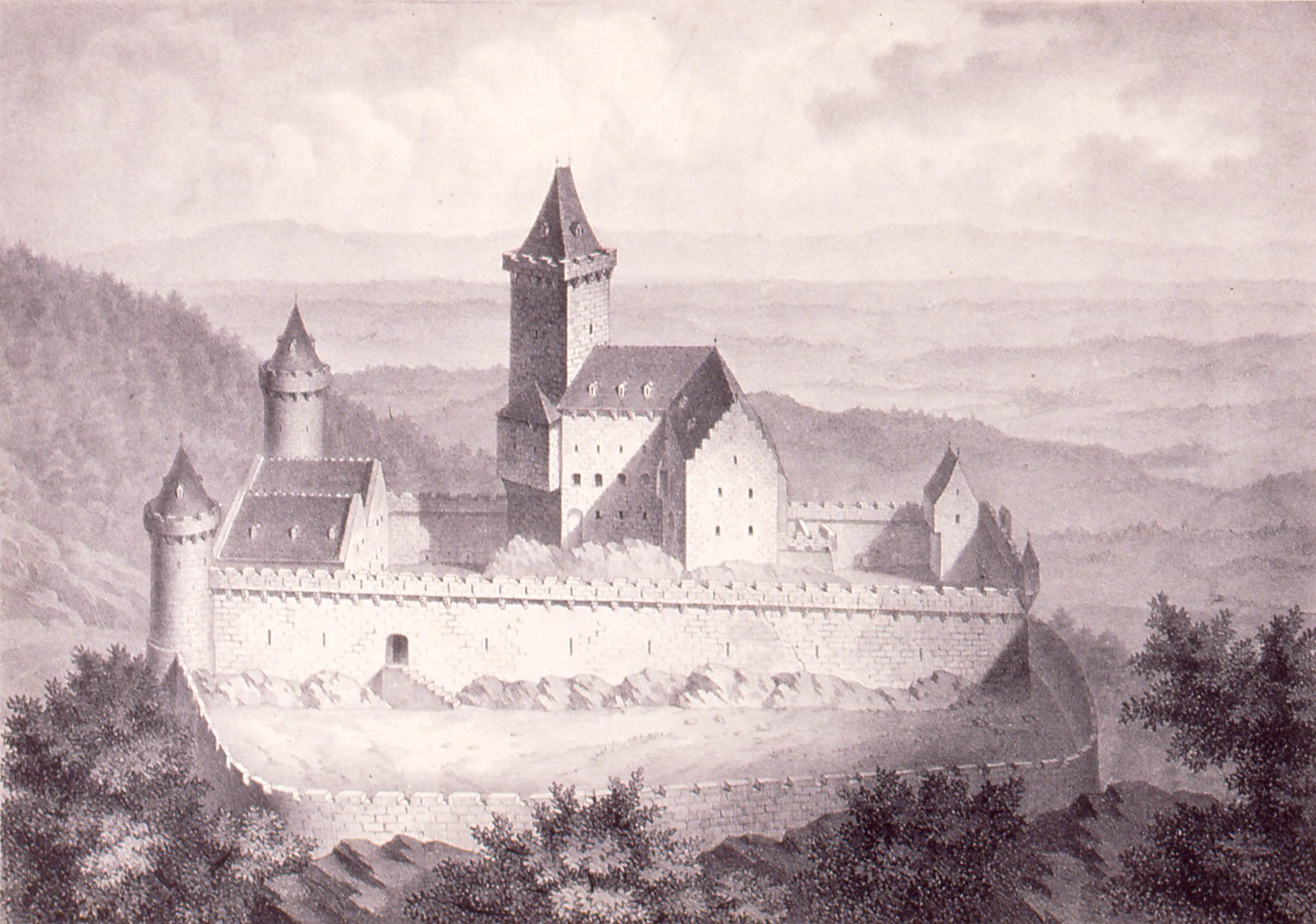
The castle as it appeared in the 16th and 17th centuries

== See also ==
- List of castles in France
