= Randoald of Grandval =

Saint Randoald of Grandval
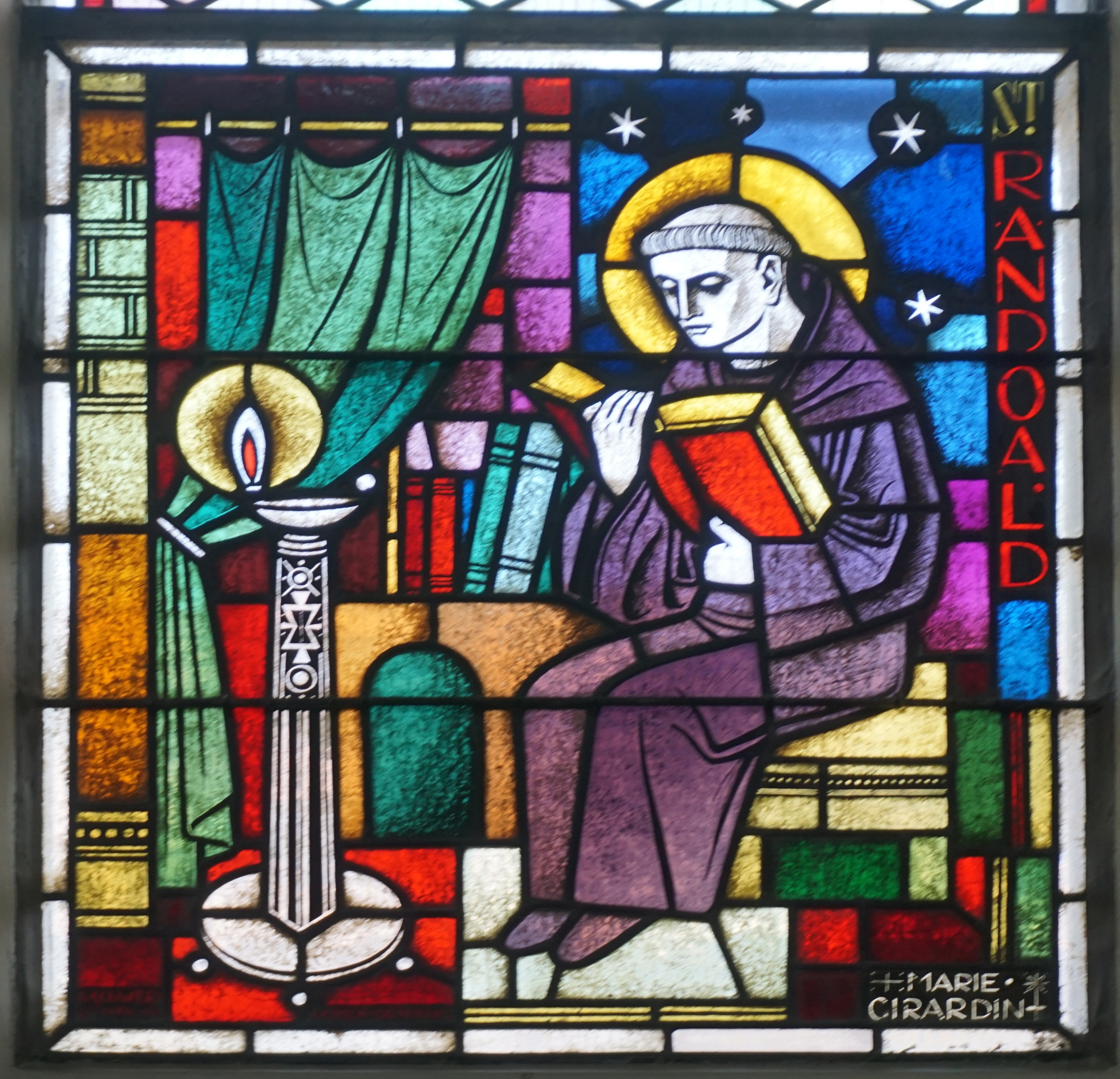
- Stained glass depiction of Saint Randoald in the Church of Saint Martin, Saint-Imier, Bernese Jura, Switzerland.

Martyr
- Died: 21 February 675 near Moutier
- Venerated in: Eastern Orthodox Church; Roman Catholic church
- Canonized: Pre-congregation
- Feast: 21 February
- Attributes: Monk's habit, martyr's palm, spear

Saint Randoald (also Rancald, Randaut; died 21 February 675) was prior of the Benedictine Moutier-Grandval Abbey under Germanus of Granfelden. He is venerated as a saint in the Eastern Orthodox Church and Roman Catholic church.

== Passio sancti Germani ==
The Passio sancti Germani recounts the death of Saint Randoald and appears in the eleventh-century Vitae et passiones diversorum sanctorum. (Note: Images of the manuscript of Vitae et passiones diversorum sanctorum may be viewed online through the 'e-codices': Virtual Manuscript Library of Switzerland project; link to first page of Vitae shown below: Presbyter Bobulenus, "Passio sancti Germani", Vitae et passiones diversorum sanctorum [Lives and sufferings of the Saints], Codex Sangallensis 551 (in Latin), pp. 106−125, doi:10.5076/e-codices-csg-0551, St. Gallen, Stiftsbibliothek (Abbey library of Saint Gall)) Written around 695 by Bobolène, a priest of Luxeuil Abbey, at the request of the religious brothers Chadoal and Aridius (contemporaries of Randoald), the manuscript is preserved in the Codex Sangallensis 551 ("Codex of Saint-Gall" 551), housed in the Abbey library of Saint Gall.

== Death ==
Randoald was martyred together with Germanus by partisans of the Duke of Alsace, Eticho. The monk and his abbot stood up for the region's poor against Eticho's efforts to subdue the inhabitants of the region around Delémont. Randoald had accompanied Abbot Germanus to the Church of Saint Maurice in Courtételle where the abbot remonstrated with the duke regarding his depredations in the area. The monastics had just left after negotiations with the duke and were returning to Moutier-Grandval. One of the duke's lieutenants with a few men set off in pursuit. They caught up with them and executed them, one of the soldiers cutting Randoald's head off, while Germanus was pierced with a spear.

== Veneration ==
The following night the religious collected the bodies and buried them first in Saint-Ursanne, then in Moutier-Granval.

They are both venerated as saints in the Eastern Orthodox and Catholic Churches. Miracles reportedly took place at their tomb, which became a center of pilgrimage. The remains of the martyrs were in 1477 transferred under the high altar. Their cult extended throughout the diocese of Basel and throughout the province of Besancon. The relics of the abbey were taken to the Church of Saint-Marcel in Delémont at the Reformation; the church still has the relics of Saints Germanus and Randoald, where they continue to be venerated. Their feast day is 21 February, the anniversary of their deaths.
