= Eugenia of Alsace =

French saint and abbess

Saint Eugenia of Alsace
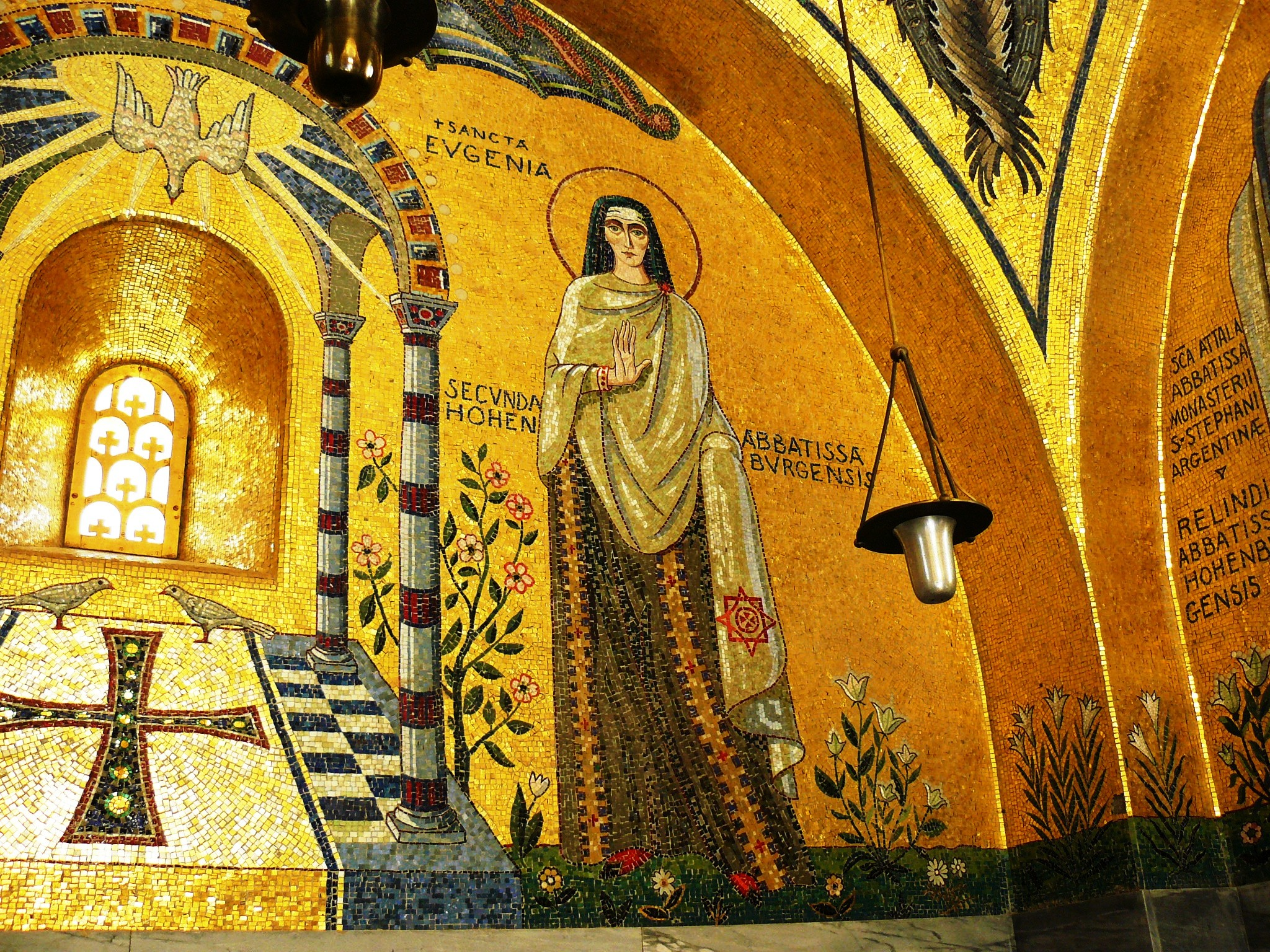
- Mosaic representing Eugenia in the Chapel of Tears of the Convent of Mont Sainte-Odile.

Abbess of Hohenburg, Venerable
- Residence: Hohenburg Abbey
- Died: 16 September 735
- Honored in: Eastern Orthodox Church; Roman Catholic Church
- Feast: 16 September

Eugenia of Alsace (French: Eugénie d'Alsace, died 16 September 735), was the second abbess of the Hohenburg Abbey, in Alsace from 721 to 735 who is venerated as a Christian saint. She was a niece of Saint Odile and sister of Saint Attalus. Saint Eugenia's feast day is celebrated on 16 September, which was the day she died of natural causes in 735 in Hohenburg.

== Biography ==
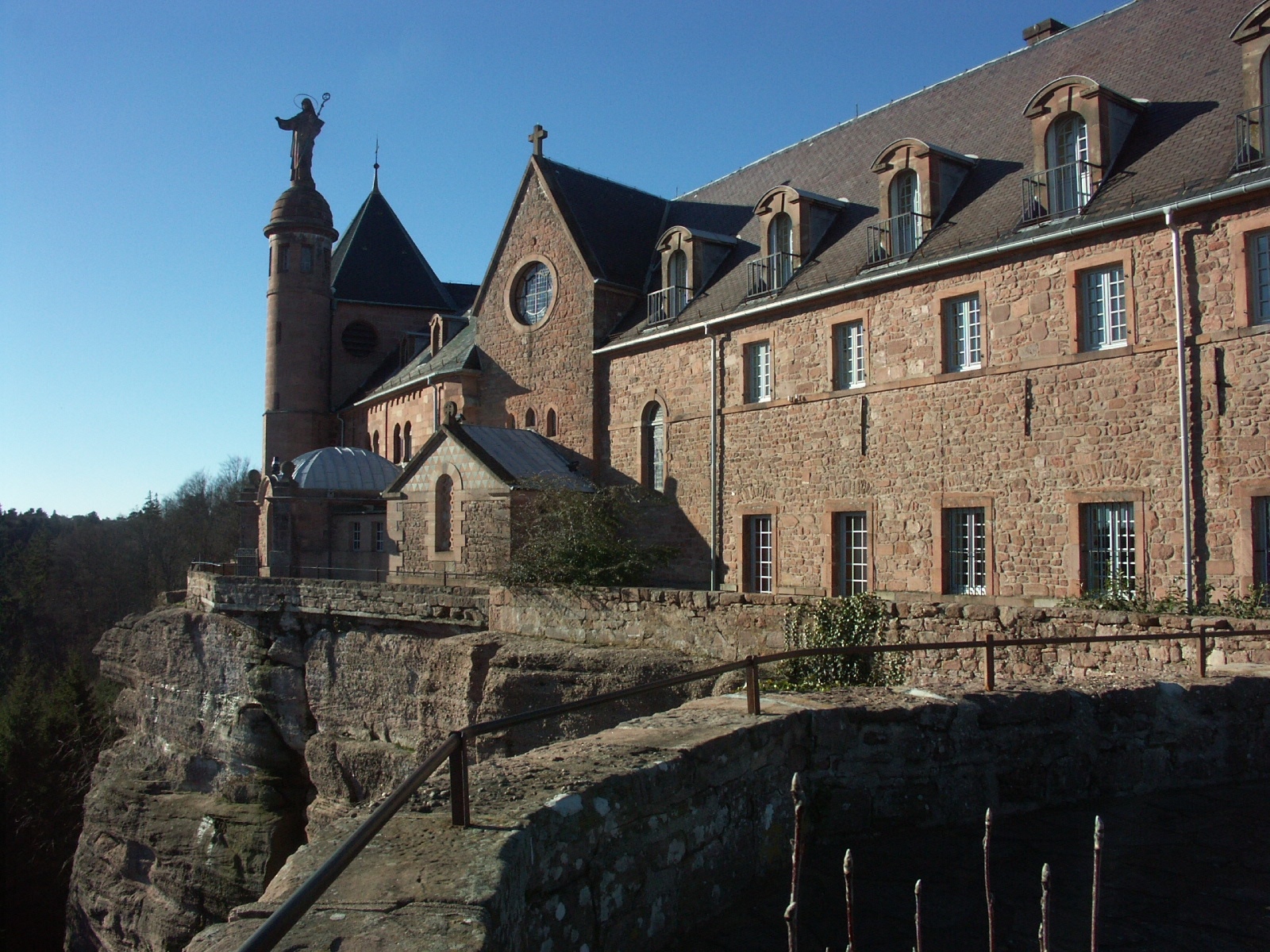
Monastery and convent atop Mount Odile.

Eugenia was born into nobility as the daughter of Adalbert of Alsace, Duke of Alsace. She followed in the footsteps of her aunt, Saint Odile (died about 720), the first abbess of Hohenburg, who is known as the patron saint of good eyesight and for whom the mountain top is named. Mont Sainte-Odile Abbey became a well-known destination for pilgrims.

Eugenia's signature as abbess of Hohenburg (Alsace) appears in a document from 722. Like Odile, she gave the example of all the virtues to her holy community. The spirit of the pious founder reigned in these two houses and it was a very edifying spectacle for Lower Alsace to see young virgins from the first families of the country renounce the sweetness of a comfortable and pleasant life to go to devote to the practices of penance. Eugenia governed her monastery for fifteen years. After she died, her body was interred in the convent's chapel of Saint Jean Baptiste, near the tomb of her aunt, Saint Odile. Eugenia's image still appears in mosaic in the chapel.

Eugenia's remains were kept secure there from 735 until 1622 when The Thirty Years War allowed Swedish troops to invade the convent, open her tomb and scatter the bones. Only a few relics remained which were collected by the nuns there. Some bones were moved in 1622 to the church of Oberehnheim in Alsace, France. Later, some relics were transferred to the parish church in Willgottheim, Alsace, France.
