= Saint Stephen's Church, Strasbourg =

Coordinates: 48°35′00″N 7°45′21″E

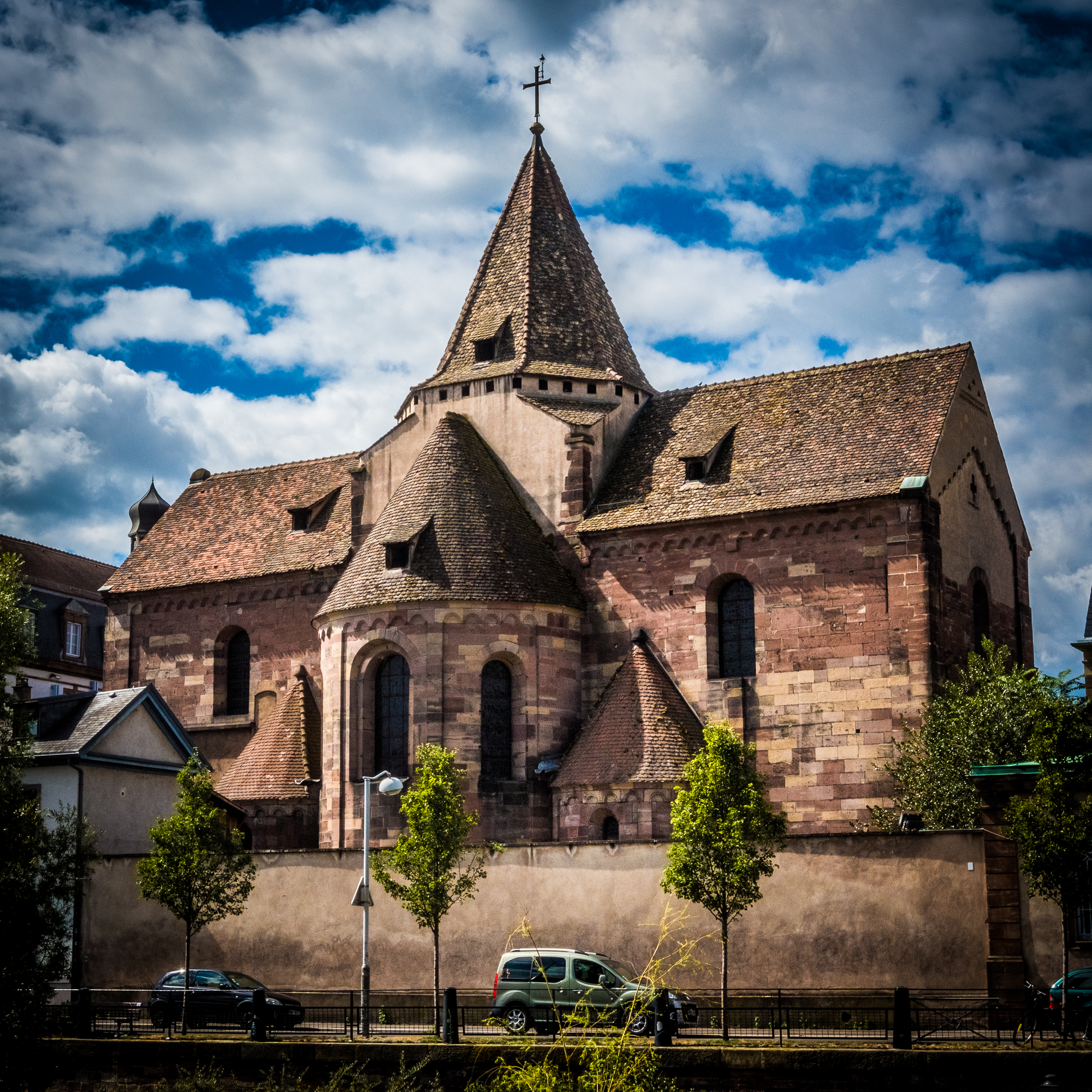
Romanesque transept, crossing and apse of Saint Stephen's Church

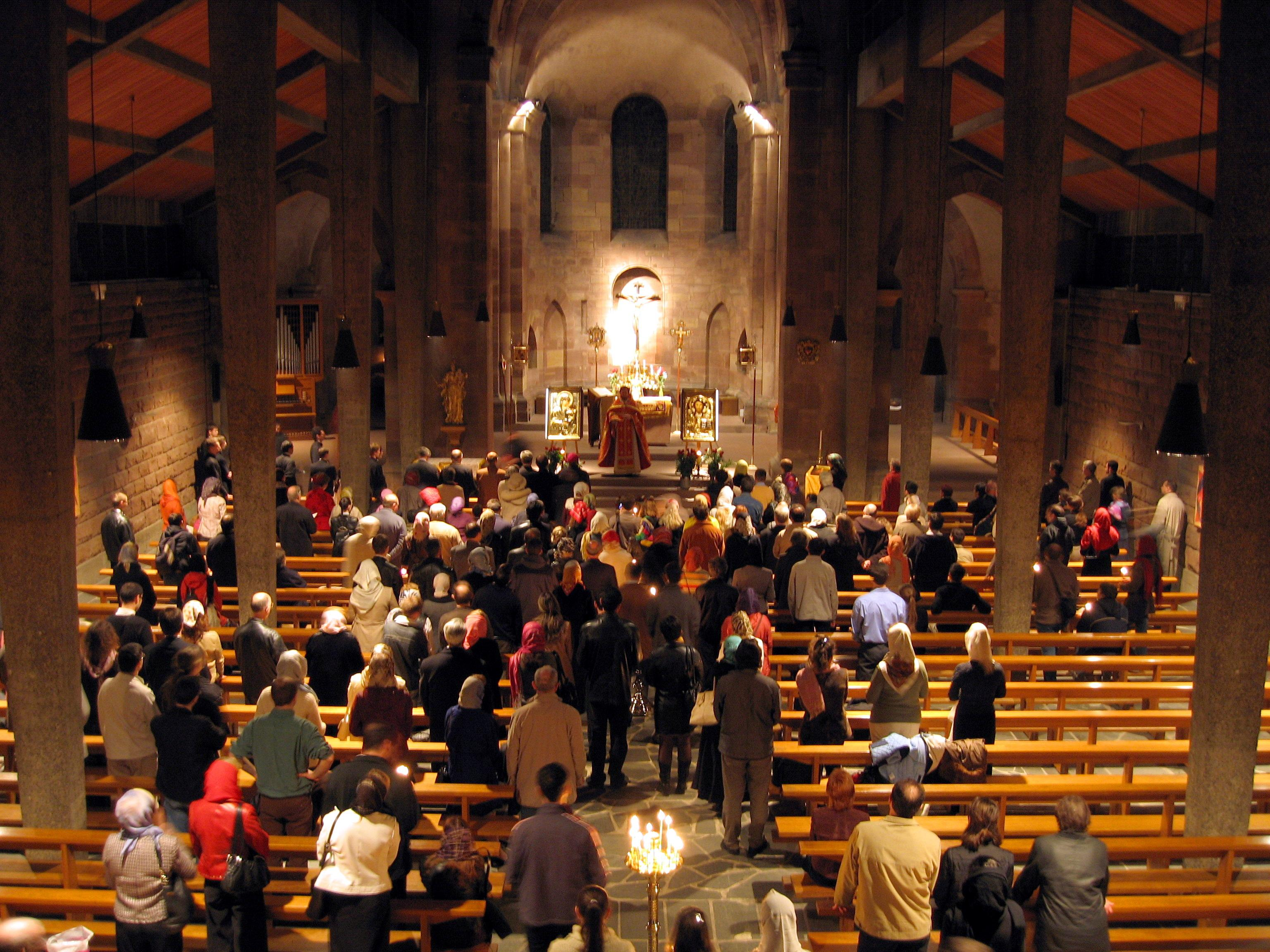
View across the 20th-century nave to the early 13th-century choir

Saint Stephen's Church (French: Église Saint-Étienne) in Strasbourg is located inside the catholic ‘Saint-Étienne’ college in Strasbourg, for which it serves as a chapel.

Saint Stephen's is one of the oldest churches in Strasbourg. The crypt contains the remains of a fifth-century Roman basilica. The site was originally occupied by a Roman fort. A new church was built on the site in early in 717 by Duke Adalbert of Alsace, brother of Saint Odile, as part of a new convent, in which he installed his daughter Attala as the first abbess.

The Church also served for many years as the episcopal seat for the north of Alsace.

The church was rebuilt in 1220 in Romanesque-Gothic style.

At the beginning of the 16th century, St Stephen's was a parish church, the parish of Stephen's being one of the nine parishes of Strasbourg. In 1534, as the reform was being introduced in Strasbourg, the parish of St Stephen's was transferred to St William's, on account of the opposition of the cannonesses of St Stephen's to the new teaching.

In the seventeenth century Louis XIV closed the abbey and transferred it to the Visitandines to serve as a boarding school for young women, a function which continued up until the French Revolution. In 1714 the church was equipped with an organ by Andreas Silbermann, which is now in Bischheim. After the French Revolution, the building was used as a warehouse, then as a theatre. In 1802, the church was deprived of its tower and in 1805 this was transformed into a theatre.

The college, of which the church now forms part, began life in 1861 as a 'Petit seminaire' (literally 'little seminary'), educating future priests as well as lay students.

Allied bombing destroyed much of the building in 1944. Only the wide transept with its triple apse survived. In 1956, the ancient site was excavated and a Merovingian apse was discovered beneath the foundations of the old tower. In 1961, the nave was renovated, exposing the timber structures. The church was classified as a historical monument in 1962.

In 2016, the monumental concert organ from the former conservatory located in the National Theatre of Strasbourg was moved into the nave in order to be used as a church organ. The instrument, a 1963 work by organ builder Curt Schwenkedel, had been out of use since 1995. It was entirely restored by Quentin Blumenroeder from Haguenau.

As the Church is now part of a school, public access is only possible on special occasions, such as European Heritage Days. The school owns some valuable historical tapestries from the abbey church, some of which can be seen in the nearby Notre Dame museum.
