= Mont Sainte-Odile Abbey =

Abbey in Bas-Rhin, in France

Coordinates: 48°26′16″N 07°24′17″E

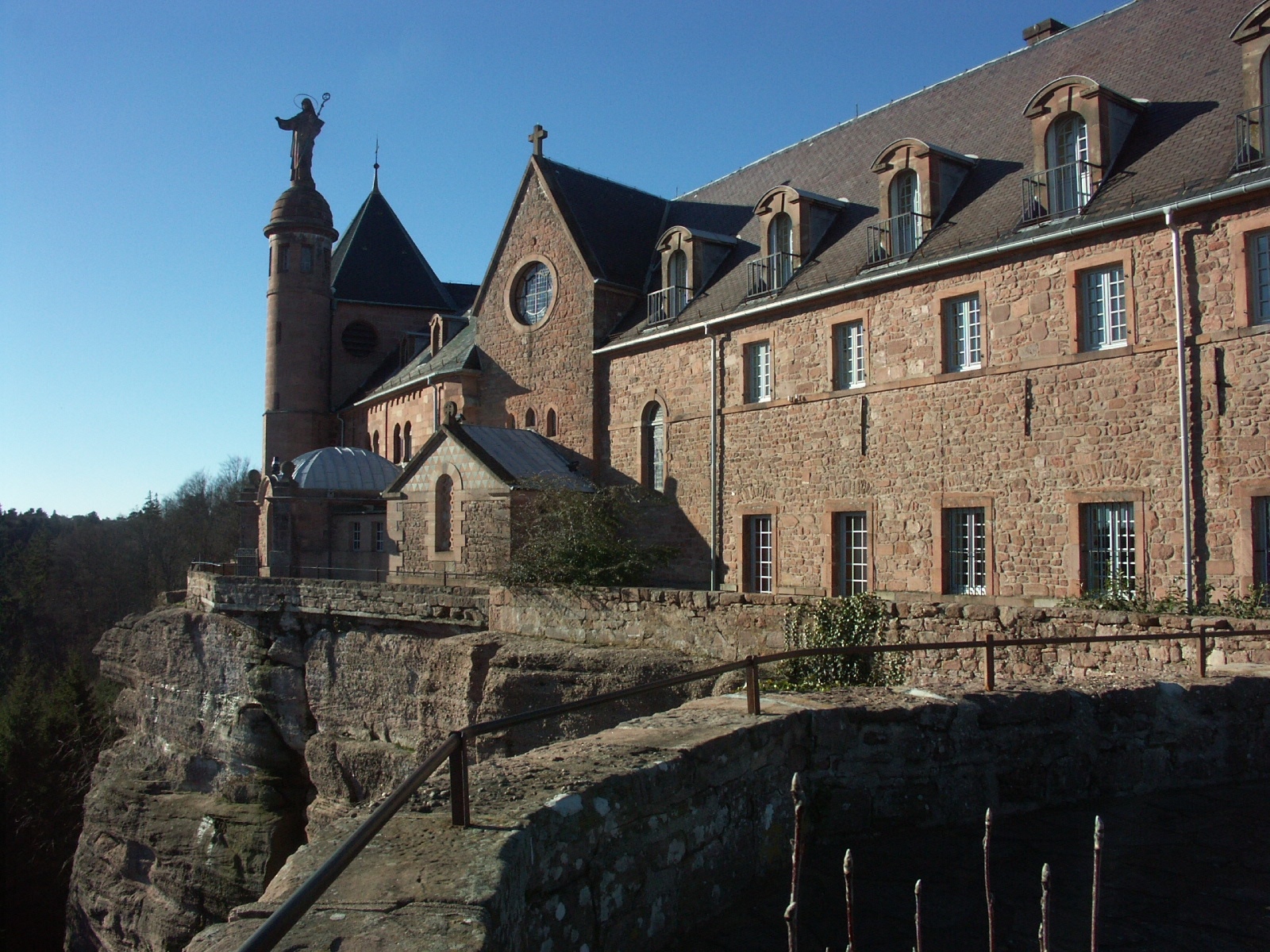
Mont Sainte-Odile Abbey

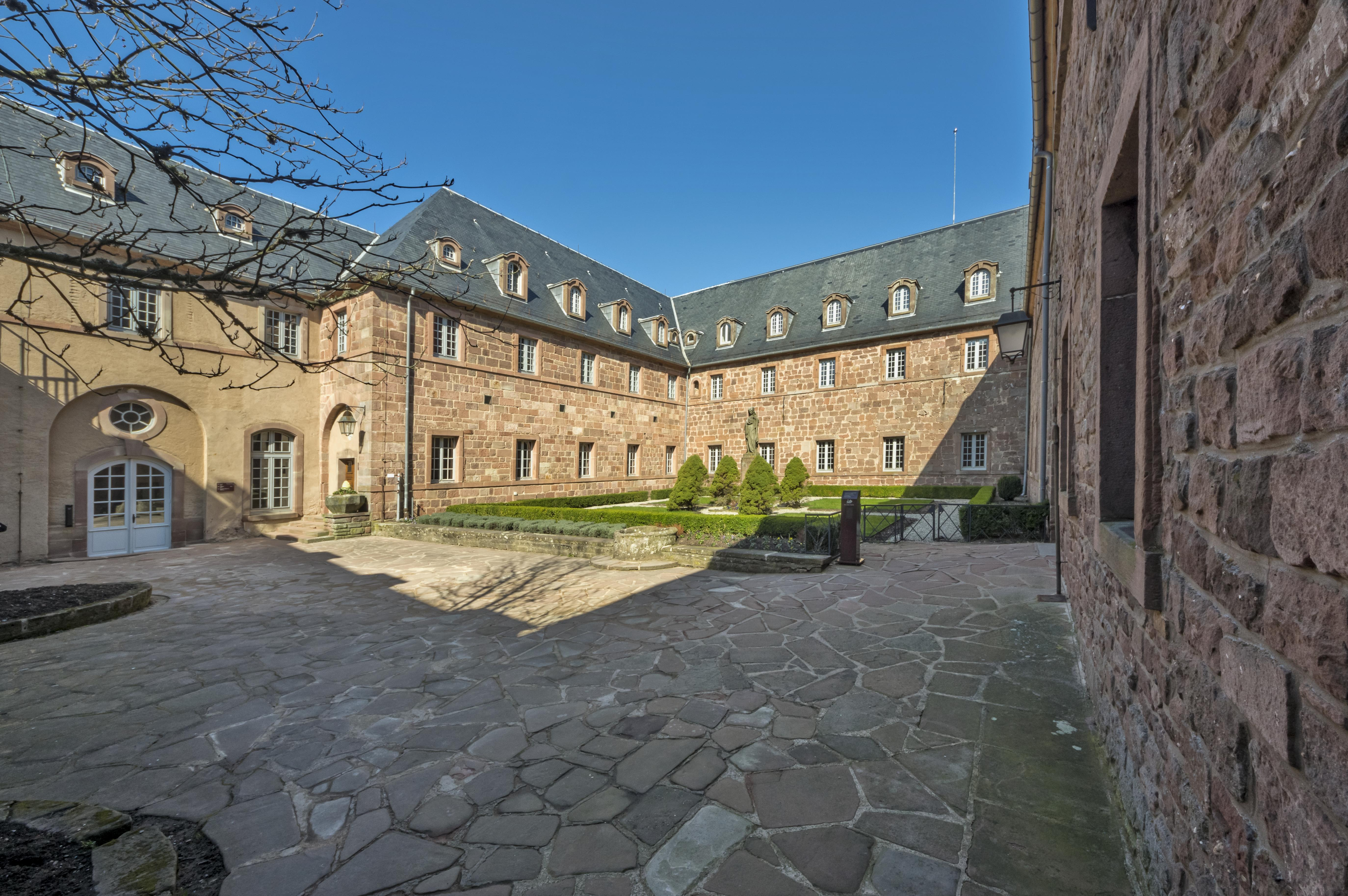
Courtyard of the cloister

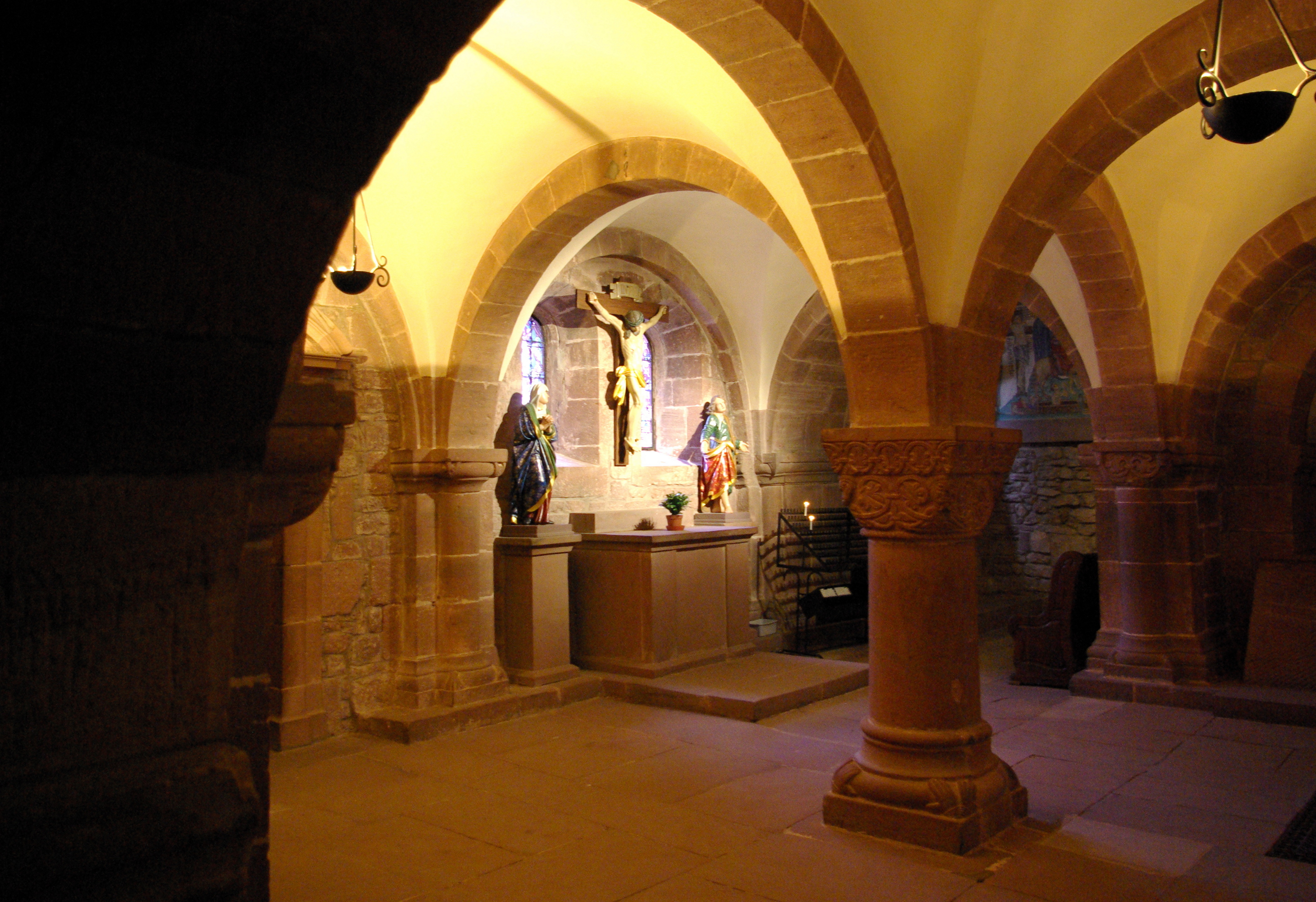
Chapel of the Cross

Mont Sainte-Odile Abbey, also known as Hohenburg Abbey, is a nunnery, situated on Mont Sainte-Odile, one of the most famous peaks of the Vosges mountain range in the French region of Alsace.

== History ==
It was founded about 690 by Adalrich, Duke of Alsace for his daughter, Odile, who was its first abbess. Saint Eugénie d'Alsace (died 735) was its second abbess. On the eastern slope of the Mont Sainte-Odile the first abbess built a hospice called Niedermünster or Nieder-Hohenburg, which afterwards became a house for ladies of nobility until it was destroyed by lightning in 1572.

Originally Hohenburg seems to have been occupied by Benedictine nuns who were replaced by canonesses in the 11th century. Devastated by fire several times, the abbey church was rebuilt in 1050 and consecrated by Pope Leo IX. When in the first half of the 12th century the monastery began to decline, its discipline was restored by Abbess Relindis of Bergen near Neuburg an der Donau, who became abbess of Hohenburg in about 1140. During her rule Hohenburg became famous for its strict discipline as well as the great learning of its nuns.

She was succeeded in 1167 by Herrade of Landsberg, under whose rule the fame of Hohenburg continued to increase. She built the Premonstratensian monastery of Saint Gorgo on the slope of the mountain in 1178, and the Augustinian monastery of Truttenhausen at its foot. Herrade was the author of Hortus deliciarum, a collection of short treatises on theology, astronomy, philosophy, and other branches of learning, also containing some original Latin poems with musical accompaniment, and some beautiful drawings. (The work was destroyed at the conflagration of the Strasbourg library in 1870). One noteworthy tradition of the abbey is the production of unicorn images; illustrations of unicorn hunts were particular to female orders.

Hohenburg Abbey was destroyed by fire in 1546. Some of the nuns returned to their parents, others became Protestants and married.

In 1661, Hohenburg was rebuilt and occupied by Premonstratensians. During the French Revolution it was confiscated by the government and sold as national property in 1791. In 1853 Andreas Räss, Bishop of Strasbourg, purchased the buildings for his diocese.

Perpetual adoration has been practiced at the convent since 1931.

== 2000-2003 book theft ==
Between August 2000 and May 2002 more than 1,000 ancient books went missing from the monastery library. Stanislas Gosse, a book collector and local teacher, stole the books after finding an old map in the city archives showing a secret entrance into the library. The route was not easy, however, involving climbing up exterior walls, a steep staircase and a secret chamber. A mechanism then opened the back of one of five cupboards. The disappearance of so many books over such a length of time confused the librarian, the monks and the police, with Gosse finally being caught by closed-circuit television cameras in 2003. Gosse received a fine, a suspended prison sentence, and was assigned community service of helping catalog the books in the library at Sainte-Odile.
