= Niedermunster Abbey, Alsace =

Abbey in Bas-Rhin, France

Coordinates: 48°26′06″N 7°24′30″E

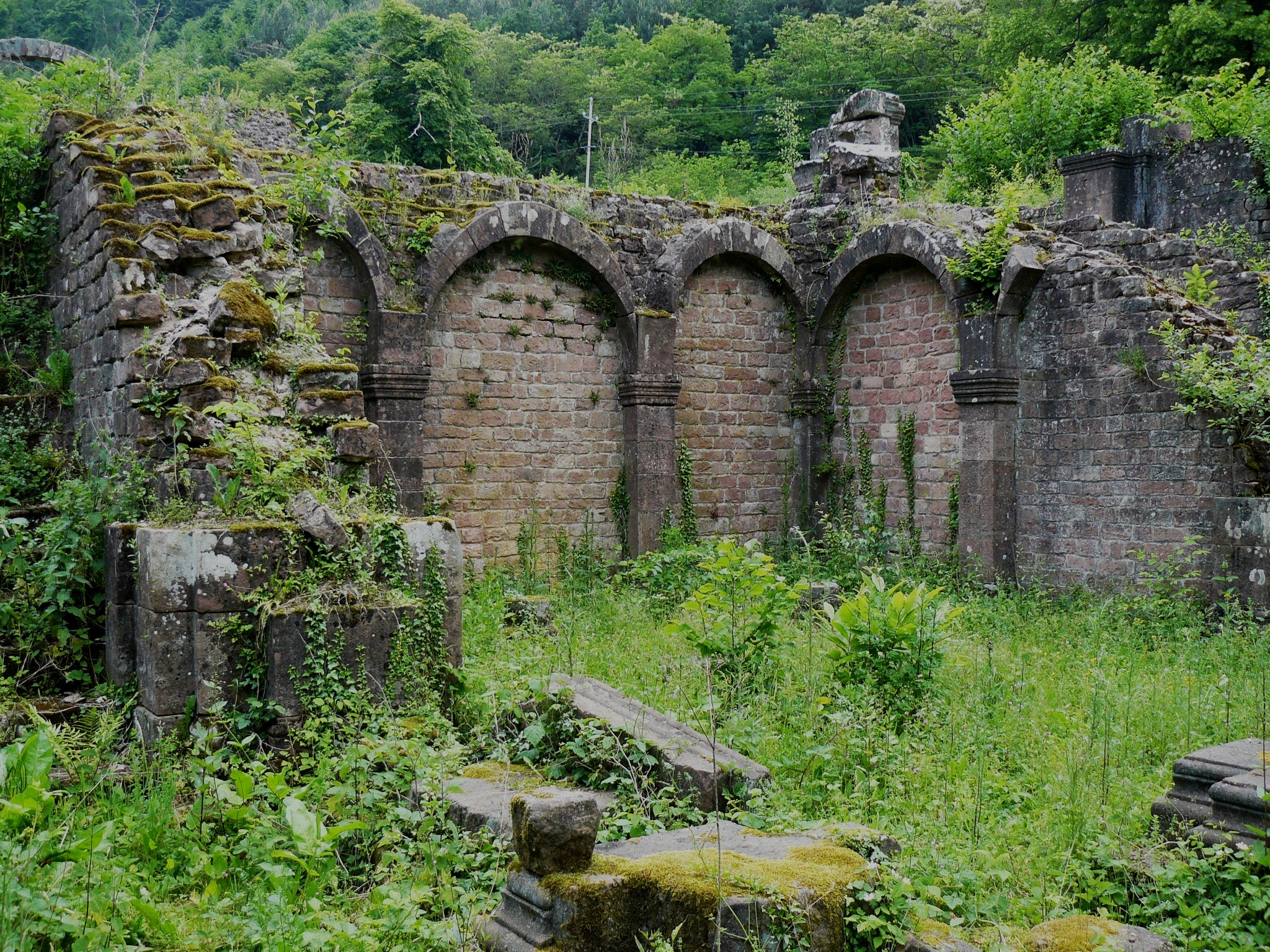
Ruins of Niedermunster Abbey

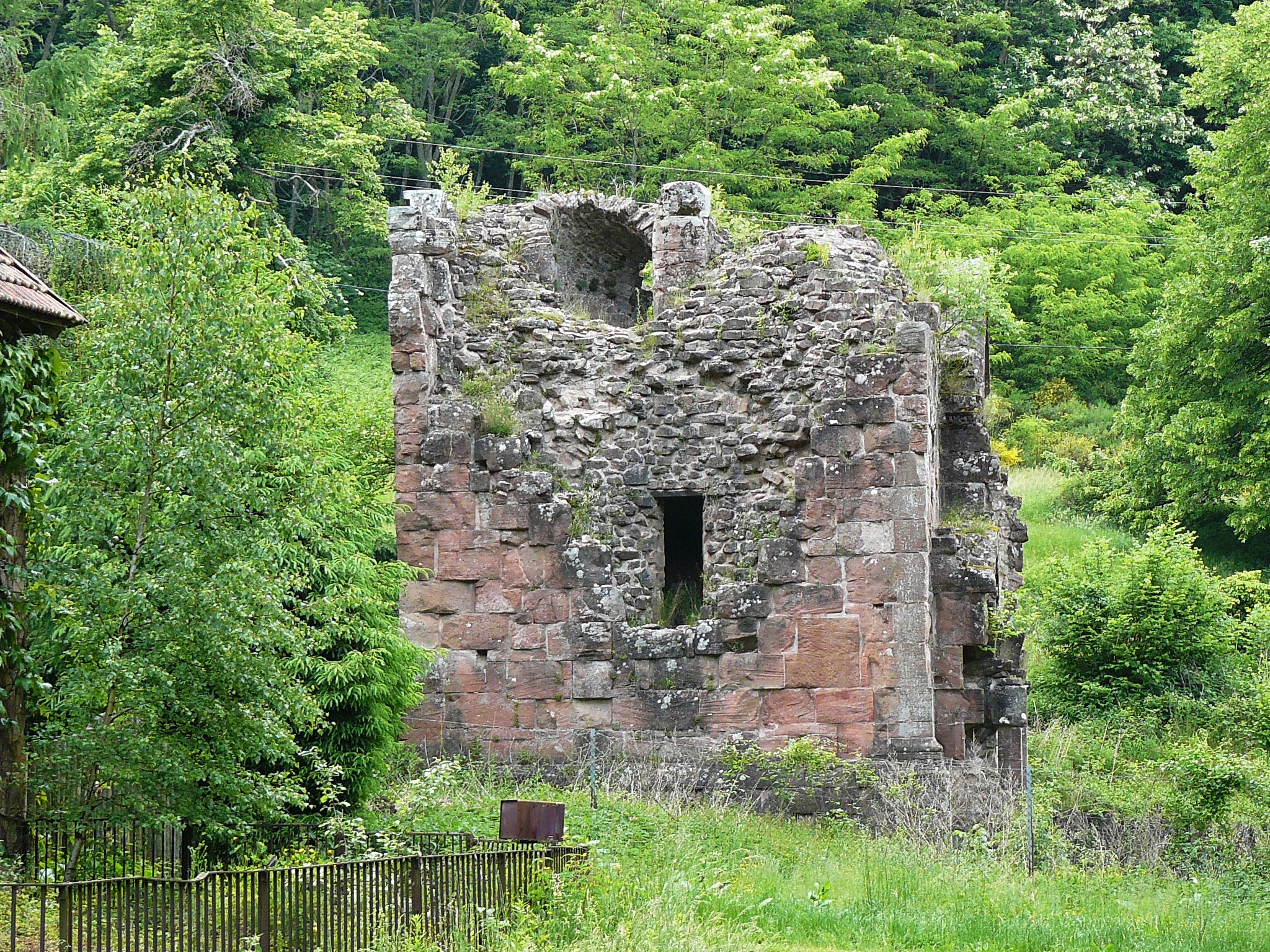
Part of the ruins of Niedermunster

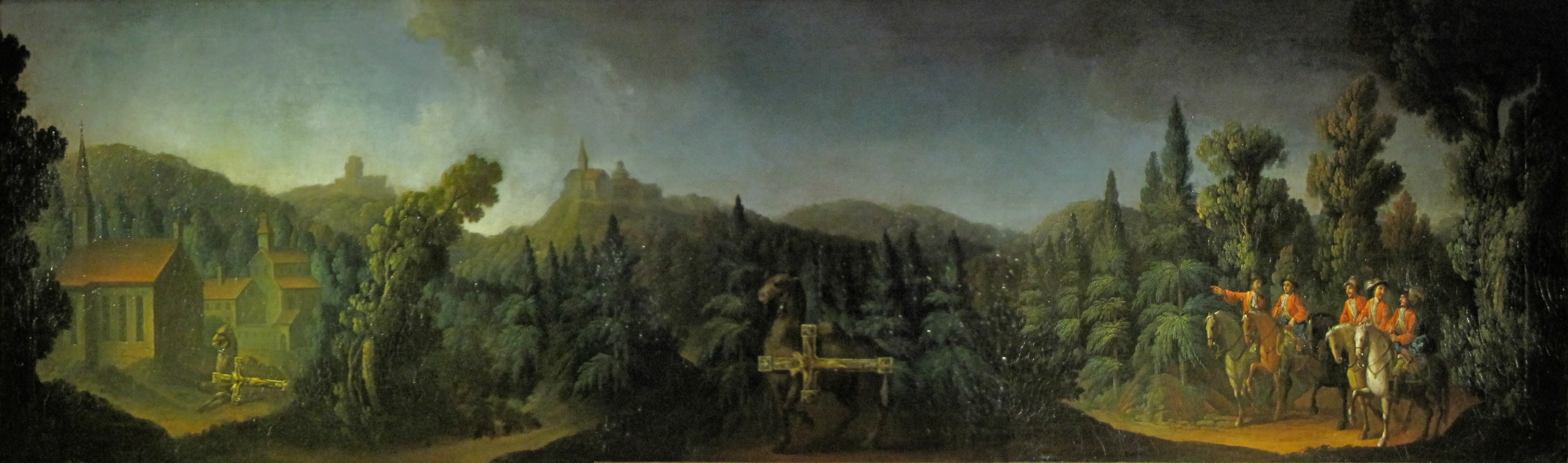
Legend creation Niedermunster Mont Sainte-Odile Camel

Niedermunster Abbey, situated at the foot of Mount Saint Odile at an altitude of 511 metres, was founded around 700 A.D. to cater for the overflow of pilgrims to the Saint Odile Abbey, formerly known as the Hohenbourg.

The abbey was founded by Saint Odile of Alsace, who was also the first Abbess. When Saint Odile died, in Niedermunster Abbey in 720, her niece Gundelina took over as abbess.

Until the end of the 12th century, the two abbeys formed a single institution, but from the beginning of the 13th century, they began to operate as separate establishments. In 1542 the abbey came under the authority of the Great Chapter of Strasbourg Cathedral.

The Abbey buildings of which the ruins are still visible today were built between 1150 and 1180 AD. The Abbey was seriously damaged during the Peasants' War in 1525 and again by two fires, in 1542 and 1572. The nuns abandoned the abbey in 1545 and it was never reoccupied.

The site was then used, up until the 19th century, as a quarry for other buildings, including the adjacent farm.

A hospital was built at the site, in addition to the abbey.

For several centuries the abbey was known for its relics, the head and arm of Saint Lazarus of Marseille. When the abbey was burnt down these were transferred to Andlau, eventually disappearing during the French Revolution.

== The Camel, the Cross and the Foreskin ==
Legend has it that, in 799 the future Charlemagne received a large number of relics from Fortunatus the patriarch of Jerusalem, including a fragment of the Holy Cross and the Holy Foreskin. This he later offered to Hugo of Tours who, feeling that he was not worthy to receive such a gift, had the gold cross which contained it strapped to a camel and sent it off to roam where it would, accompanied by five knights. The camel finally stopped at Niedermunster, there the knights founded the adjacent St James' hermitage. A similar Charlemagne legend relates that a fragment of the cross was given to William of Gellone and kept in the monastery of Saint-Guilhem-le-Désert.

There are two paintings of this event still in Alsace, one in Molsheim and the other in Andlau.

This relic attracted many visitors, the most famous of whom was reputedly Richard the Lion Heart in 1194, although the earliest reference to this visit can only be traced back to 1751.

The Abbey was also famous for its huge cross, one of the best known artworks of Carolingian France, reputedly part of the true cross. In the 16th century it was transferred to the Jesuits at Molsheim, only to disappear during the Revolution, when it was melted down in the Strasbourg Mint.

The well in the centre of the abbey is still said to cure eye diseases.
