= Boniface, Duke of Alsace =

Second Duke of Alsace

Bonifacius, often shortened to Boniface, was the second Duke of Alsace, in the mid 7th century. He is an obscure figure and his background is unknown, but charter evidence and onomastics make him a relative of the family of Gundoin and Wulfoald, a powerful extended kin group in Austrasia. He succeeded Gundoin as duke in Alsace and was himself succeeded by Adalrich, founder of the Etichonids.

Boniface had trouble keeping the people of the Sornegau from revolting. Boniface founded the a hunting lodge on the site of the future village of Wihr-au-Val around 660. Until the 10th century it was known as Bonifacii Villare. He "was involved" in the foundation of Gregoriental monastery around 662 and he was the first recorded donor to the abbey of Weissenburg in 661. This last donation was conditional: the gift passed to the monastery only upon the death of the granter, though such a practice had died out by the 780s. It does not indicate that Boniface died in 661.

== Sources ==
- Hummer, Hans J. Politics and Power in Early Medieval Europe: Alsace and the Frankish Realm 600 – 1000. Cambridge University Press: 2005.
