= Bergen, Neuburg =

Coordinates: 48°47′00″N 11°08′35″E

Bergen (German pronunciation: [ˈbɛʁɡn̩]) is a village near Neuburg an der Donau, in Neuburg-Schrobenhausen, in Upper Bavaria, in Bavaria. The place is known locally as Baring. It is part of the municipality of Neuburg an der Donau.

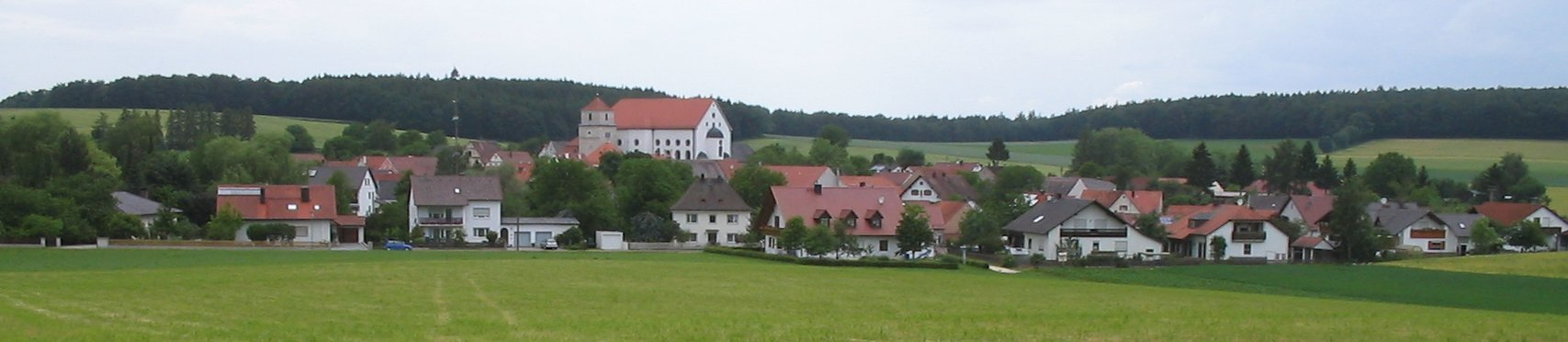
Panoramic view

== Location ==
Bergen lies about 8 km north of Neuburg an der Donau.

== Sights ==
Pilgrims church of the Holy Cross: Rococo frescoes by Johann Wolfgang Baumgartner, with Roman tower and Roman crypt (with the Rococo changes undertaken sensitively); Renaissance epitaph for Wilhalm von Muhr and his wife (by the sculptor Loy Hering).

== History of the church ==
- 787 first mention at the time of Karl the Great
- 976 establishment by Wiltrudis
- 27 September 988 confirmation of the establishment by Johannes XV
- 1007 delivery of the monastery by emperor Heinrich 11th to the Bamberg diocese
- 1095 consecration of a church new building by bishop Ulrich I of Eichstätt
- 1155 fire destroys large parts of the church
- 1190 consecration after re-establishment by bishop Otto von Eichstätt
- 1542 first abolition of the monastery by Ottheinrich Pfalzgraf of Neuburg
- 1552 final abolition of the monastery by Ottheinrich Pfalzgraf of Neuburg
- 1618 recatholicising of Bergen
- 1635 delivery of the church and parts of the monastery goods to the Jesuits of Neuburg
- 1700 church and crypt are reconditioned and extended by 7 altars
- 1755 change of the church
- 1758 consecration of the new building by prince bishop Raimund Anton of Eichstätt
- 1799 tower altered
- Around 1920 renovation of the church
- 2001-03 renewed renovation of the church
