= Fidelio (disambiguation) =

Fidelio is the only opera written by Ludwig van Beethoven.

Fidelio may also refer to:

- Fidelio (film), an Australian television live recording of the opera
- Fidelio: Alice's Odyssey, a 2014 French film
- Fidelio (magazine), a journal of the Lyndon LaRouche movement
- Fidelio Records, a classical music label
- "Fidelio", a password in the film Eyes Wide Shut
- Fidelio, discontinued software from Hotline Connect
- MICROS Fidelio, a property management system for hotels
- Fidelio F. Finke (1891–1968), Bohemian/German composer
- "Fidelio", a single by rapper Fakemink
- Fidelio award, of Music and Arts University of the City of Vienna
- "Witte Brigade-Fidelio", from 1944 the name of the Belgian WW II-era resistance group White Brigade. "Fidelio" was the code name for its founder and commander, Marcel Louette.

== See also ==
- 524 Fidelio, an asteroid
- Fidel (disambiguation)
- Fidelia (disambiguation)
- Fidelis (disambiguation)
