= Fidelia =

Fidelia may refer to:

- Fidelia (given name)
- Fidelia (pseudonym), common in the 18th century
- Pat Fidelia (born 1959), Haitian-American soccer player

Biology

- Fidelia (bee), a genus of insects in family Megachilidae
- Bradina fidelia, a moth in the family Crambidae
- Spilarctia fidelia, a moth in the family Erebidae
- Scorzoneroides (formerly Fidelia), a plant genus in the dandelion tribe

Other

- Fidelia and Speranza, a 1776 painting by Benjamin West
- Fidelia Isthmus, Heard Island, Antarctica

== See also ==
- Fidelio (disambiguation)
- Fidel (disambiguation)
