= Fidelis (name) =

Fidelis (Latin for "fidelity") is a given name (usually male) and surname. The equivalent is Fidélis in Portuguese or Fidel in Spanish.

Bearers of the name include:

Known by given name alone

- Saint Fidelis (disambiguation):
  - Carpophorus and Fidelis, legendary associates of Felinus and Gratian (died c.250).
  - Fidelis of Como (died c. 304), soldier-saint.
  - Fidelis (bishop of Mérida) (fl. 550s)
  - Fidelis of Sigmaringen (1577 - 1622), Counter-Reformation martyr.
- Fidélis (footballer, 1944-2012), José Maria Fidélis dos Santos, Brazilian football defender
- Fidélis (footballer, born 1989), Philipe Fidélis dos Santos, Brazilian football striker
- Fidelis, pseudonym of Agnes Maule Machar (1837–1927), a Canadian writer.
- Fidelis, pseudonym of Felix Boenheim (1890–1960), a German doctor and politician

Given name, with surname

- Fidelis Chojnacki(1906–1942), a Polish Capuchin friar and priest.
- Fidelis Fernando (born 1948), a Sri Lankan bishop
- Fidelis Gadzama (born 1979), Nigerian athlete and Olympic medalist.
- Fidelis Irhene (born 1996) a Nigerian football player who plays for Doxa Katokopias.
- Fidelis Justin Rasolonomenjanahary, a Malagasy politician.
- Fidelis Júnior Santana da Silva (born 1981), known as "Juninho", a Brazilian footballer.
- Fidelis Leite Magalhães, Timor-Leste
- Fidelis Makka (born 1950), Military Governor of Benue State, Nigeria
- Fidelis Mhashu (died 2018), a Zimbabwean politician.
- Fidelis Morgan (born 1952), an English actress.
- Fidelis Ndyabagye (born 1950) a Ugandan athlete.
- Fidelis Obikwu (born 1960), an English athlete.
- Fidelis Oditah (born 1964), a Nigerian barrister and jurist.
- Fidelis Okoro, a Nigerian politician.
- Fidelis Onye Som (born 1945) a Nigerian boxer.
- Fidelis Oyakhilome, (born 1939) a military governor of Rivers State, Nigeria.
- Fidelis Rakotonarivo (born 1956) a Madagascar bishop.
- Fidelis Saviour (born 1988) a Nigerian footballer.
- Fidelis Tapgun, a Nigerian politician and diplomat.
- Fidelis Uzochukwu Okafor, Nigerian academic and state governor.
- Fidelis Wainaina (1962–2008), founder of Maseno Interchristian Child Self Help Group

Middle name

- Eric Fidelis Alva (born 1970), U.S. Marine seriously injured in the Iraq War.
- Jacob Fidelis Ackermann (1765–1815), a German professor of anatomy and surgery.
- José Maria Fidélis dos Santos (1944–2012), a Brazilian footballer and coach.
- Pius Fidelis Pinto (born 1960), an Indian priest and scholar of Christianity.
- Rogério Fidélis Régis (born 1976), known as "Rogério", a Brazilian footballer.

Surname

- Andressa Fidelis (born 1994), a Brazilian sprinter.
- Cassandra Fidelis (1465–1558), Italian scholar
- Dimaku Fidelis (born 1989), a Nigerian footballer.
- Ercole dei Fidelis (c.1465–c.1504 or later), Italian goldsmith and engraver.
- Gary Fidelis (born 1964), a Malaysian field hockey player.
- Thaís Fidélis (born 2001), a Brazilian artistic gymnast.
