= Fidelis =

Fidelis may refer to:

People

- See Fidelis (name)

Places

- Fidelis, Florida, an unincorporated community and census-designated place in Santa Rosa County, Florida, United States.
- São Fidélis, a municipality in Rio de Janeiro, Brazil
- Baltazar Fidélis (CPTM), São Paulo metro station

Organisations

- Fidelis Books, division of LifeWay Christian Resources
- Fidelis Care, U.S. insurer
- Fidelis Education, technology company
- Fidelis, 501(c)4 organization owning CatholicVote.org
- Fidelis Furnishing Fabrics, litigant in Panorama Developments (Guildford) Ltd v Fidelis Furnishing Fabrics Ltd, 1971 UK company law case concerning the enforceability of obligations against a company.
- Fidelis Institute of Economic Ethics, within the Pontifical Athenaeum Regina Apostolorum.

Other

- Fidelis Andria, an Italian football club based in Andria, Apulia
- Sprint Fidelis, cardiac monitor made by Medtronic

== See also ==
- Semper fidelis (disambiguation)
- "Adeste Fidelis", Latin Christmas carol
- "Pia Fidelis", motto of various ancient Roman legions
- Fidelity
- Fidel (given name)
