= Fidelia (given name) =

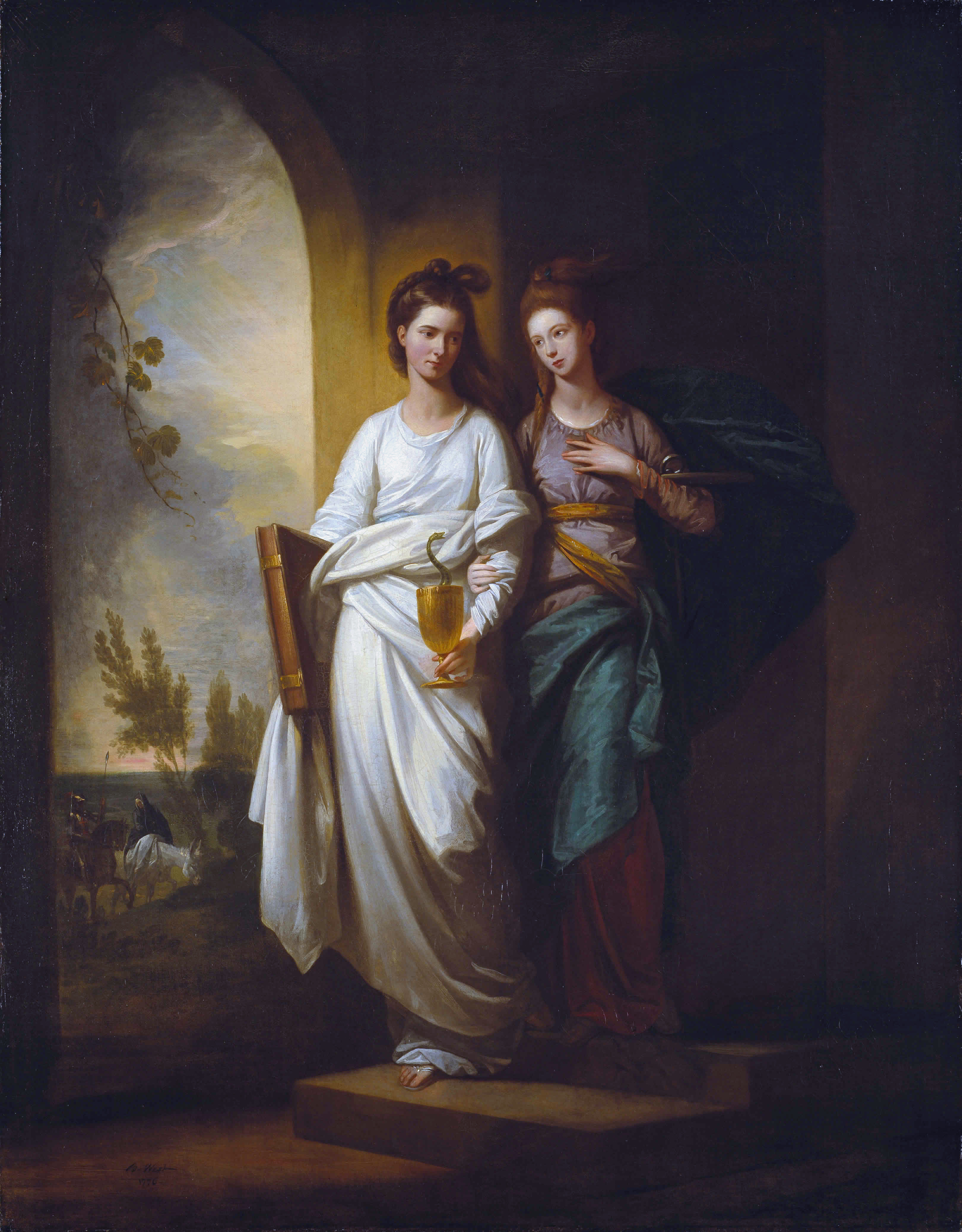
- Fidelia and Speranza by Benjamin West, 1776.
- Gender: Female
- Language: Latin

Origin
- Meaning: faithful

Other names
- Related names: Delia, Fadelia, Fedelia, Fedella, Fedelma, Fida, Fidea, Fidel, Fidele, Fidelice, Fidelina, Fidelise, Fidelity, Fidella, Fidelle, Fidelma, Fides, Fidessa, Fiducia, Fydell, Fydella, Phidelia, Phidella

Fidelia is a feminine given name derived from the Latin fidelis, meaning faithful. It was in use by the Puritans as a virtue name and was particularly well used in various forms in the 19th century.

== Women ==
- Fidelia Bridges (1834–1923), American artist
- Fidelia Brindis Camacho (1889–1972), Mexican teacher, journalist, suffragist, women's rights activist and politician
- Fidelia Fielding (1827–1908), American Member of the Mohegan Pequot people, and last-known speaker of the traditional Mohegan Pequot language
- Fidelia Fisk (1816–1864), American Congregationalist missionary and teacher
- L. Fidelia Woolley Gillette (1827–1905), American Universalist minister
- Fidelia Heard (1822-1895), an American captain's wife who made important initial contributions to research on Heard Island, an Antarctic island now part of Australia's Territory of Heard Island and McDonald Islands
- Fidelia Hill (1794–1854), British-born Australian poet
- Fidelia Jewett (1851–1933), American educator
- Fidelia Adams Johnson (1905–1996), American educator
- Fidelia Njeze (born 1964), Nigerian diplomat
- Ana Fidelia Quirot (born 1963), Cuban former track and field athlete and Olympian

== See also ==
- Fidelia (pseudonym), a popular pseudonym of 18th-century English writers
