= KDX =

KDX may refer to:

- Knocked Down eXport
- Korean Destroyer eXperimental, a Korean shipbuilding program
- KDX (software), a Bulletin Board System-style program (à la Hotline) by Haxial.
- kdx become GNOME Console
