= Wainaina =

Wainaina is a surname. Notable people with the surname include:

- Angel Wainaina (1983–2009), Kenyan actress, radio presenter and rapper
- Anthony Wainaina, Kenyan MP
- Binyavanga Wainaina (1971–2019), Kenyan writer
- Catherine Wainaina (born 1985), Kenyan beauty pageant winner
- Eric Wainaina (musician) (born 1973), Kenyan singer-songwriter
- Erick Wainaina (born 1973), Kenyan marathon runner
- Fidelis Wainaina, Kenyan activist
- Njoki Wainaina
