= Fidèle =

Fidèle or Fidele may refer to:

- Fidèle (album), a 1981 album by Julio Iglesias
- Fidèle (dog) (2003–2016), a yellow Labrador and tourist attraction in Bruges, Belgium
- Bourg-Fidèle, a commune in the Ardennes department in northern France
- Saint-Fidèle, Quebec, Canada
- French frigate Fidèle (1789)
- French frigate Fidèle (1795)
- Le Fidèle, French name of the 2017 film Racer and the Jailbird

== People with the given name ==
- Fidèle Agbatchi (born 1950), retired Beninese Roman Catholic archbishop
- Fidèle Dimou (born 1957), Congolese politician
- Fidèle Dirokpa (fl. 2003–2009), Democratic Republic of the Congo Anglican bishop
- Fidèle Gouandjika (born 1955), Central African politician and businessman
- Fidèle Moungar (born 1948), Chadian doctor and a veteran politician who served as Prime Minister of Chad in 1993
- Jean-Fidele Diramba (born 1952), former football referee from the African state of Gabon

== See also ==
- Fidel (disambiguation)
