= Delia =

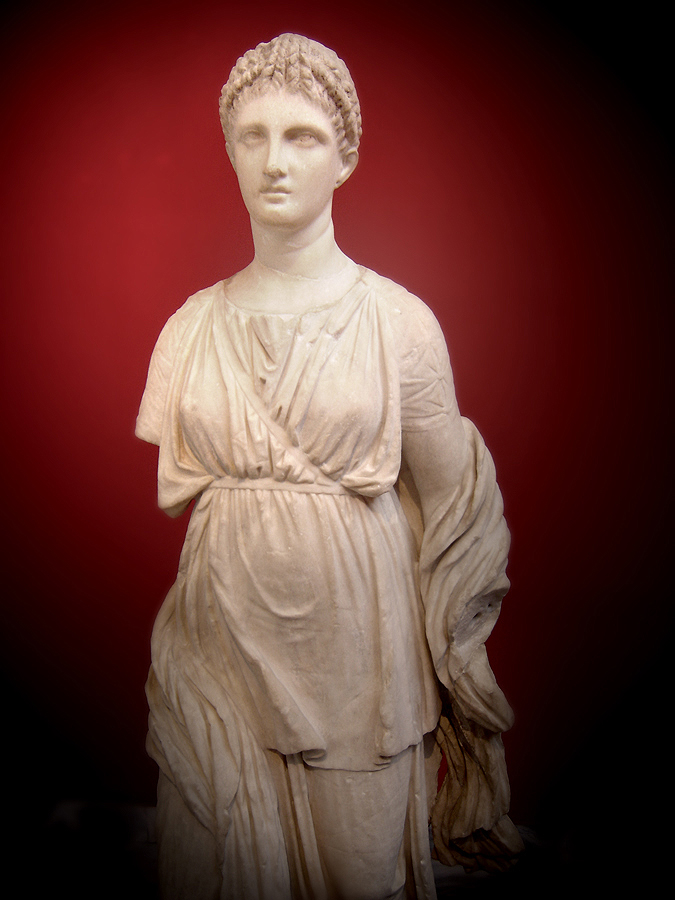
- A statue of the Delian-born goddess Artemis, found on the sacred island of Delos
- Gender: Feminine

Origin
- Meaning: generally "woman from the island of Delos"

Other names
- Related names: Delio (masculine equivalent); Della, Adelia, Bedelia, Cordelia, Fidelia, Odelia

Delia is a feminine given name either taken from an epithet of the Greek moon goddess Artemis, or else representing a short form of Adelia, Bedelia, Cordelia or Odelia. Della is a diminutive form.

== Meanings and origins ==
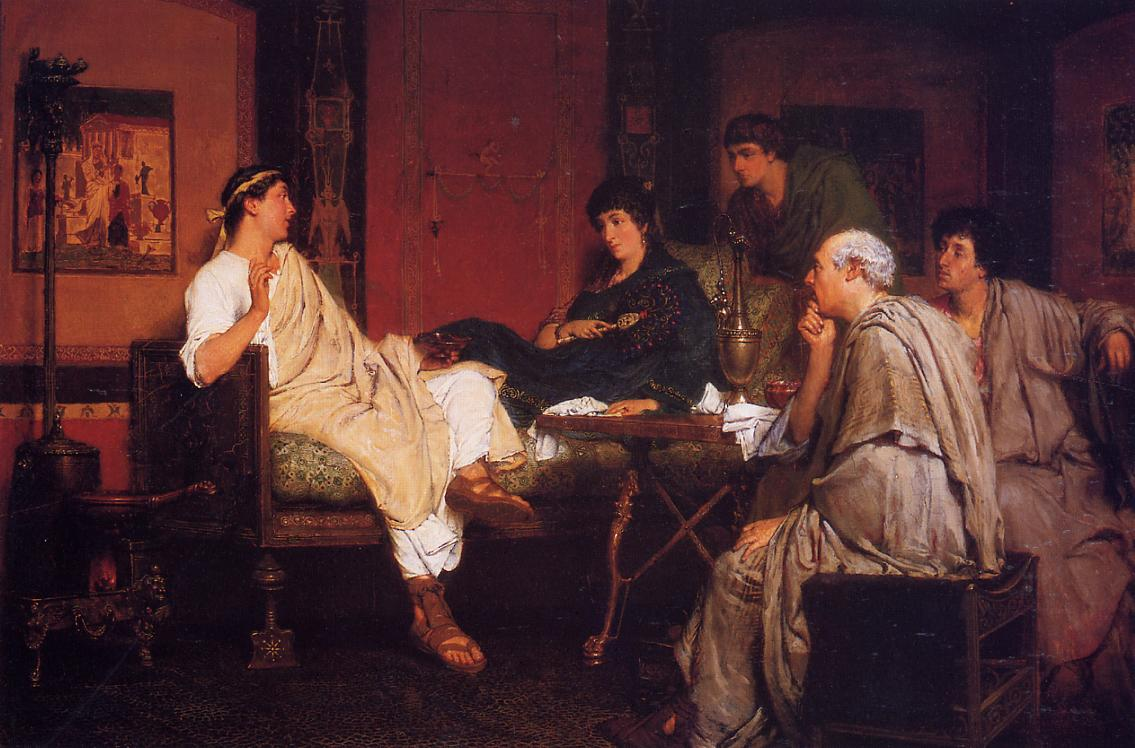
Lawrence Alma-Tadema, Tibullus at Delia's

According to records for the 1901 Irish census, there were 6,260 people named Delia living that year in all 32 counties of Ireland, with 256 more bearing the full forename Bedelia (plus 59 other people with the variant spelling Bidelia, and 361 Biddy, 529 Bride and 153984 Bridget). These related names originated as English renderings of the Irish name Brighid (or Bríd) meaning "exalted one", which originally belonged to a fertility goddess (later, to an important medieval saint).

In most cases, however, the name Delia refers to the tiny Greek island of Delos (Ancient Greek: Δῆλος), the birthplace of Artemis and her twin brother Apollo, given because they were born on the island of Delos. The name was used by Roman poet Tibullus as the pseudonym of his lover Plania in very popular love poems and thanks to him "Delia" later appeared in several poems of the 16th and 17th centuries, and it has occasionally been used as a given name since that time.

== People ==
- Delia Akeley (1869–1970), American explorer
- Delia Arnold (born 1986), Malaysian professional squash player
- Delia Bacon (1811–1859), American author and Shakespearean scholar
- Delia Boccardo (born 1948), Italian actress
- Didi Contractor (1929–2021, née Delia Kinzinger), German-American architect
- Delia Derbyshire (1937–2001), British musician and composer of electronic music
- Delia Ephron (born 1944), American author, screenwriter and playwright
- Delia Fiallo (1924–2021), Cuban romance novelist and screenwriter
- Delia Garcés (1919–2001), Argentine film actress
- Delia Gonzalez (born 1970), American boxer
- Delia Green (1886–1900), teenage African-American murder victim, reported inspiration for several traditional blues songs
- Delia Grigore (born 1972), Romanian Romani writer, philologist, academic and Romani rights activist
- Delia de Leon (1901–1993), British actress and disciple of Meher Baba
- Delia Opekokew, Cree lawyer and writer
- Delia Lawrie (born 1966), Australian politician
- Delia Matache (born 1982), Romanian pop singer
- Delia Mathews (born 1990), New Zealand-born ballet dancer
- Delia Mayer (born 1967), Swiss actress and singer
- Deliana Delia Meulenkamp (1933–2013), also known by her married name Delia Dooling, Dutch-born American swimmer
- Delia Parodi (1913–1991), Argentine politician
- Delia Scala (1929–2004), Italian ballerina and actress
- Cordelia Delia Sherman (born 1951), American fantasy writer and editor
- Delia Silance (1907–1984), American educator
- Delia Smith (born 1941), English celebrity chef and cookery writer
- Delia Valeri (1870–1947), American vocal coach
- Delia Vaudan, Italian luger who competed from the late 1970s to the early 1990s
- Delia Villegas Vorhauer (1940–1992), American, Latina social worker
- Delia Webster (1817–1904), American teacher, author, businesswoman and abolitionist
- Delia Ramirez (born 1983), American politician and U.S. Representative from Illinois.

== Fictional characters ==
- Delia Banks, on the TV show Ghost Whisperer (2005–2010), played by Camryn Manheim
- Delia Brown, on the American TV show Everwood (2002–2006), played by Vivien Cardone
- Delia Busby, from the television show Call the Midwife
- Delia Cahel, from the William Butler Yeats play Cathleen ni Houlihan
- Delia Dantes, in Tui T. Sutherland and Kari Sutherland's Menagerie book trilogy
- Delia Deetz, from the 1988 movie Beetlejuice, played by Catherine O'Hara
- Delia Delfano, from the Disney Channel sitcom I Didn't Do It
- Delia Jones, the main character in Zora Neal Hurston's short story "Sweat"
- Delia Ketchum, from Pokémon, the mother of Ash Ketchum
- Delia York, in the made-for-TV movie Omen IV: The Awakening (1991; played by Asia Vieira)
- Delia, the romantic interest of the Roman love poet Tibullus's first book
- Delia, a player character in the Korean MMO Vindictus
- Delia, the main character in Elena Ferrante's novel Troubling Love
