= 401 Ottilia =

Main-belt asteroid

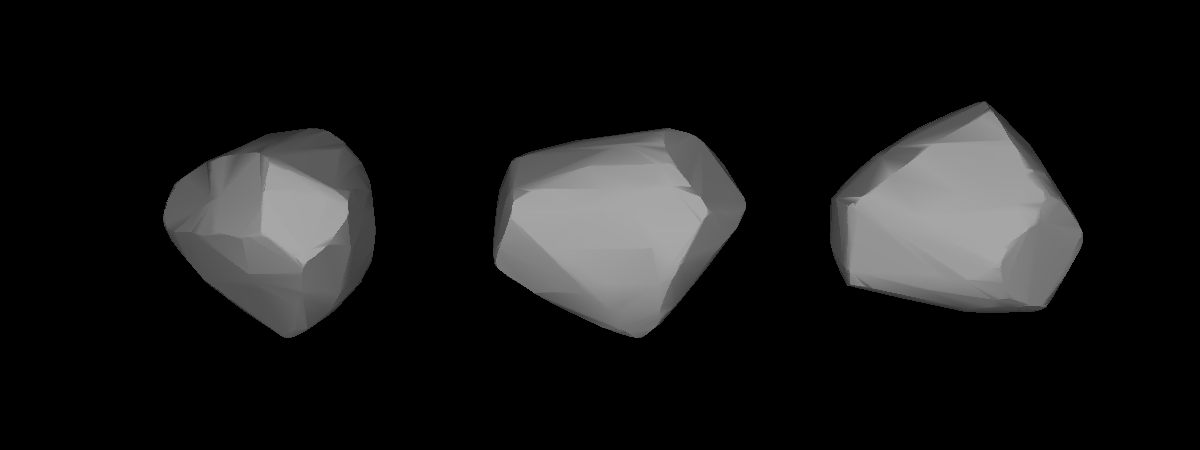
- Lightcurve-base 3D-model of 401 Ottilia.

Discovery
- Discovered by: Max Wolf
- Discovery date: 16 March 1895

Designations
- Pronunciation: /ɒˈtɪliə/
- Named after: Ottilia
- Alternative designations: 1895 BT
- Minor planet category: Main belt (Cybele)

Orbital characteristics
- Epoch 31 July 2016 (JD 2457600.5)
- Uncertainty parameter 0
- Observation arc: 121.08 yr (44225 d)
- Aphelion: 3.45079 AU (516.231 Gm)
- Perihelion: 3.24397 AU (485.291 Gm)
- Semi-major axis: 3.34738 AU (500.761 Gm)
- Eccentricity: 0.036643
- Orbital period (sidereal): 6.12 yr (2234.4 d)
- Mean anomaly: 172.933°
- Mean motion: 0° 9^{m} 40.032^{s} / day
- Inclination: 5.9715°
- Longitude of ascending node: 36.138°
- Argument of perihelion: 294.690°

Physical characteristics
- Dimensions: 87.803 km
- Synodic rotation period: 6.049 h (0.2520 d)
- Geometric albedo: 0.0412±0.002
- Absolute magnitude (H): 9.2

401 Ottilia is a large main-belt asteroid. It was discovered by Max Wolf on March 16, 1895, in Heidelberg. It is named after the Germanic folkloric character Ottilia.

The semi-major axis of the orbit of 401 Ottilia at 3.47 AU lies just outside the 2:1 Kirkwood gap, located at 3.27 AU. 401 Ottilia is part of the Cybele asteroid group.
