= Sainte-Odile, Paris =

Roman Catholic church in Paris, France

Coordinates: 48.8871°N 2.2930°E

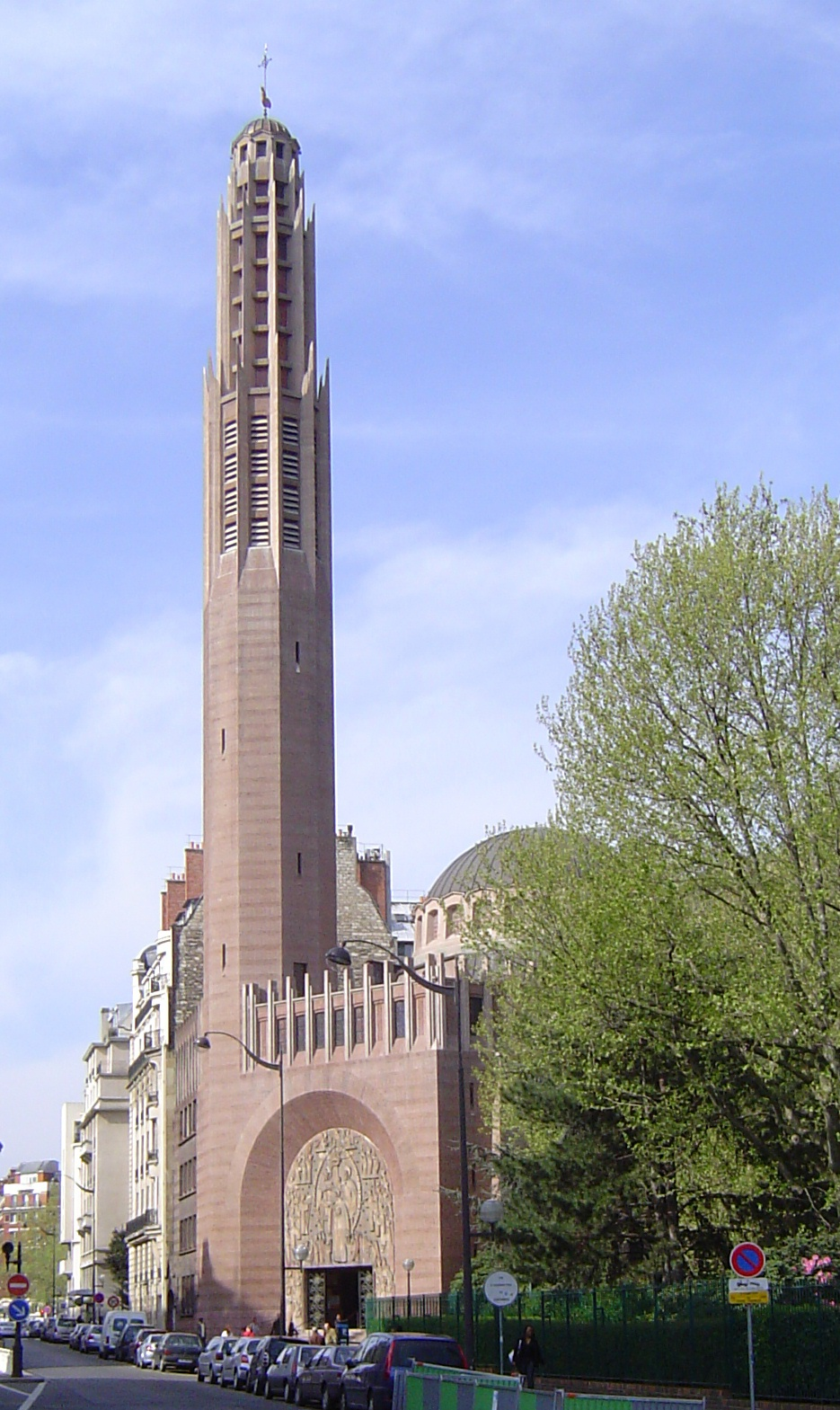
- Sainte-Odile

Religion
- Affiliation: Catholic Church
- Province: Archdiocese of Paris
- Rite: Roman Rite

Location
- Location: 2 avenue Stephane-Mallarme, 17th arrondissement of Paris
- Interactive map of Sainte-Odile, Paris

Architecture
- Architect: Jacques Barge
- Style: Art Deco
- Groundbreaking: 1935
- Completed: 1946

Sainte-Odile is a Roman Catholic church located in the 17th arrondissement of Paris, at the northwest edge of the city. It is dedicated to Saint Odile, the patron saint of Alsace. It was constructed between 1935 and 1946, and is a rare example of Art Deco architecture among the churches of Paris. Its bell tower, 72 meters high, is the tallest in Paris. It is also known for its remarkable collection of Art Deco stained-glass windows. It was classified as French historic monument in 2001.

== History ==
The project for a new church was launched by a popular journalist and curate of the church of Saint-Francois-Sales, Eugene-Edmond Loutil (1863-1959). He presented the idea to Cardinal Verdier, who was in the process of building over one hundred new churches in Paris, but was told that there was no more funding available. Loutil used his position as a journalist to appeal for funds, and raised the money needed to begin. To honour the patron saint of his native Alsace, he dedicated the church to its patron saint, Odile of Alsace.

For the architect of the project, Loutil selected Jacques Barge (1904-1979), only thirty years old and only four years out of architecture school. It was the only church he built in Paris; he concentrated later on constructing buildings in his native province of Indre.

Work on the church began in 1935 and was planned to last for three years, but in 1936, a left-wing movement, the Popular Front, took charge of the government. Construction was delayed by two nation-wide strikes, and then by the outbreak of World War II. The church was not completed until after the war, in 1946.

== Exterior ==
The design by Barge was inspired by classical Roman and Byzantine architecture, notably the Hagia Sophia in Istanbul, with its three domes, and the 10th-century Périgueux Cathedral. The octagonal bell tower resembled the minarets at Hagia Sofia.

The architect Jacques Barge included subtle symbolism into his plan. The bell tower is seventy-two meters high, and the church is the same length, reflecting the number of disciples of Christ mentioned in the Gospel of Luke.

The church was constructed of reinforced concrete, which made possible the large open space in the interior and the large stained-glass windows. However, bare concrete was not yet considered an appropriate material for the exterior of a church. Therefore, most of the interior and exterior of the church were clad in brick and stone, often laid in imaginative geometric designs.

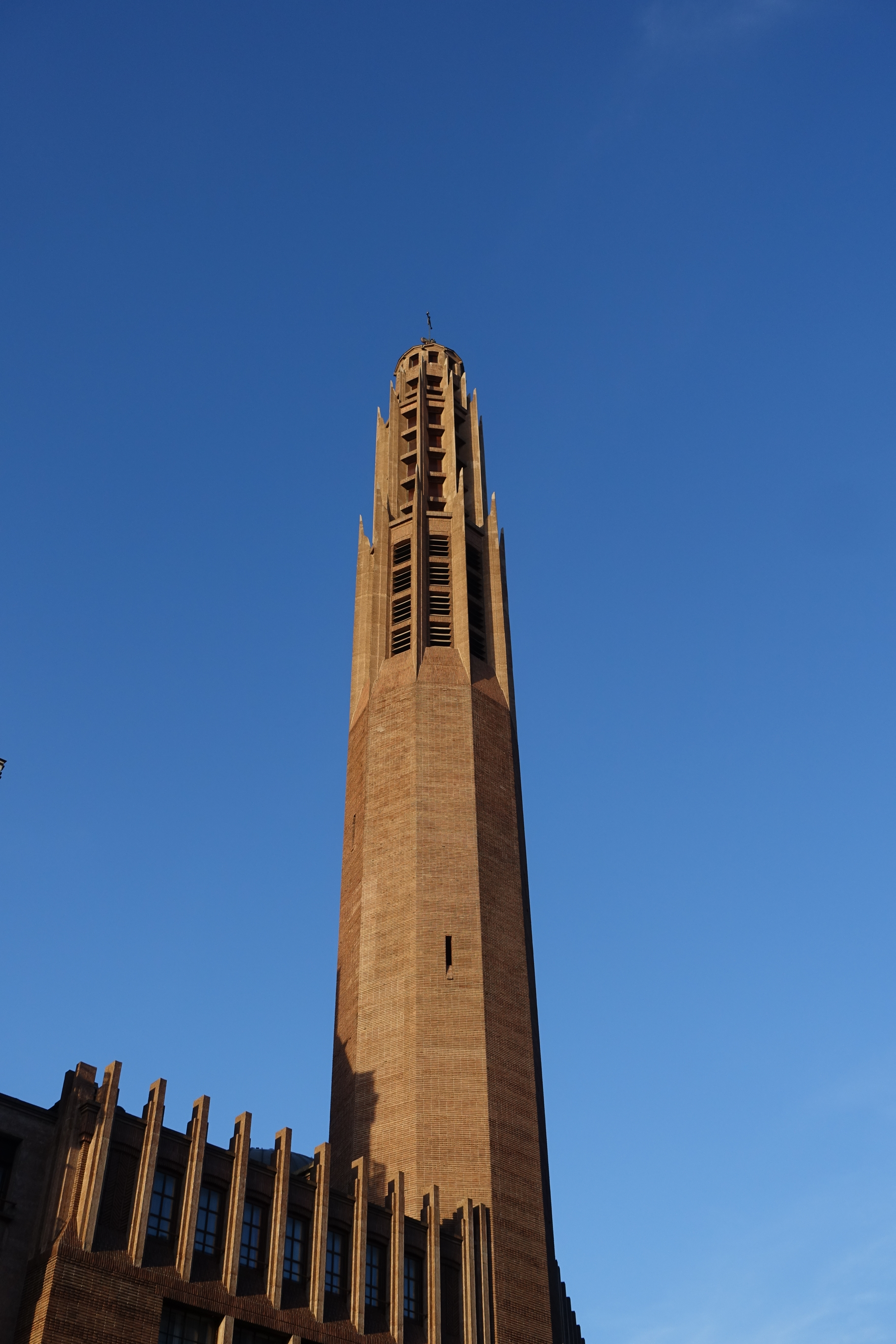
Bell tower

=== Cupolas and bell tower ===
The three cupolas, which bring a small amount of light to the interior, are constructed of thin reinforced concrete covered with a layer of copper.

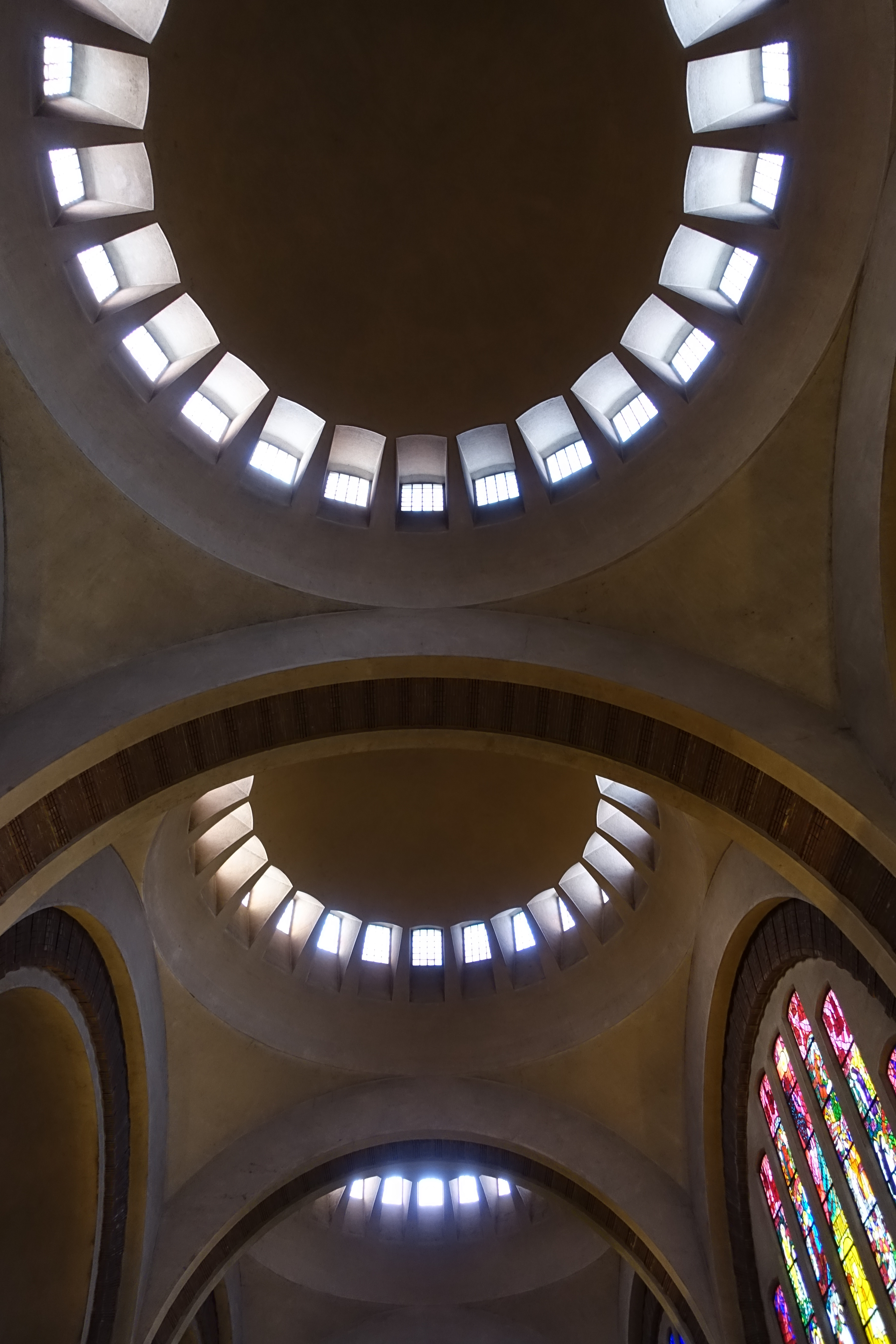
Cupolas from the interior

The bell tower was designed to be separate from the church building, to prevent the vibration of the bells from harming the church structure. It was constructed to hold twenty-three regular bells and three larger bells.

=== Tympanum and portal ===
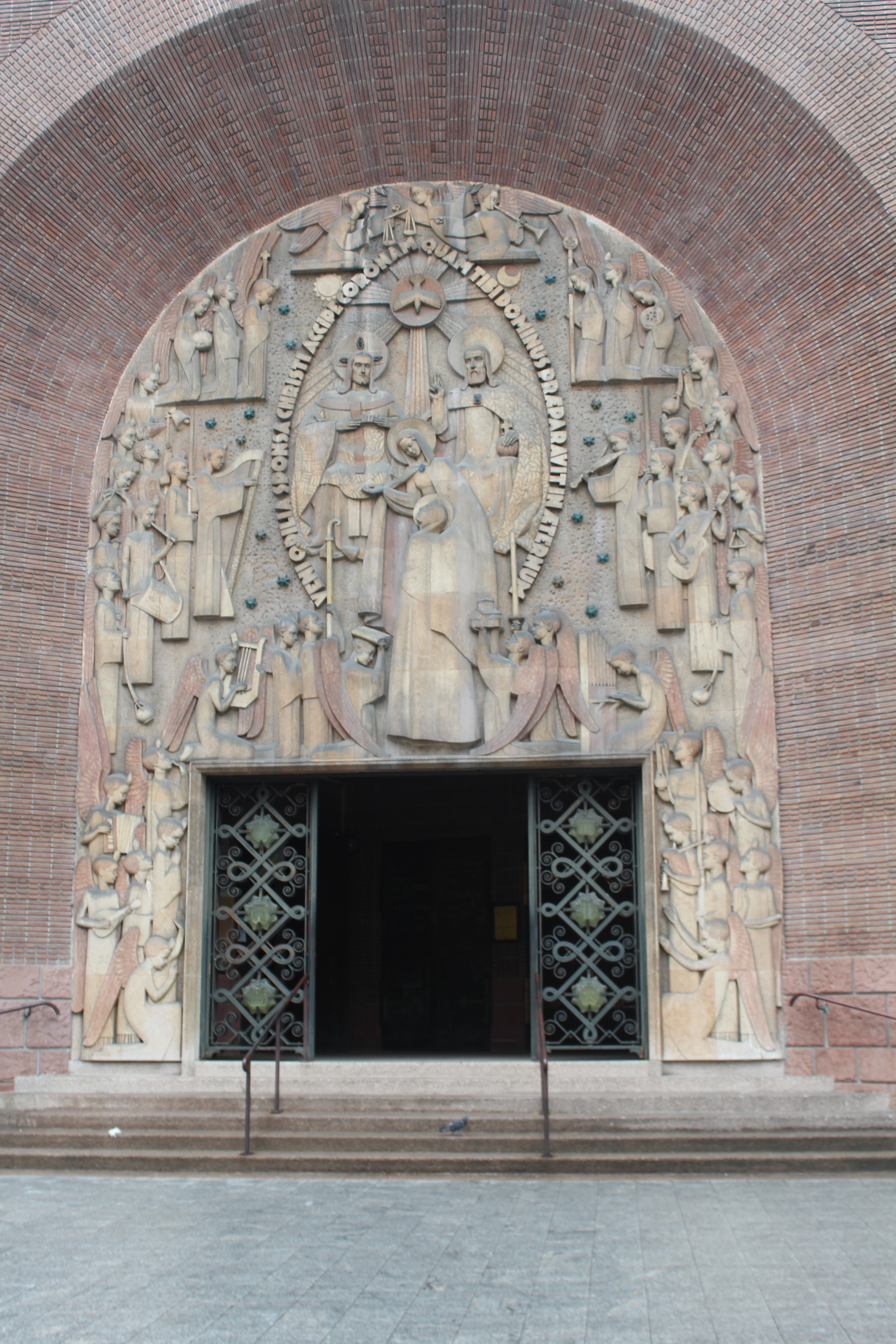
Tympanum and portal

The tympanum, the sculptural bas-relief sculpture over the main portal, was made by Anne-Marie Roux-Colas (1898-1993). It depicts the Virgin Mary introducing Saint Odile to the Heavenly Father and to Christ. The central scene is surrounded by figures of angel musicians, gathered in nine choirs, who welcome Saint Odile.

Below the tympanum is the portal to the church, decorated with a design of cast iron framing cabochons, or medallions of glass decorated with litanies of the Virgin Mary. The portal decoration is the work of Raymond Subes.

== Interior ==
The interior of the church has an abundance of Art Deco detail. The architect commissioned special works from the glass artist Francois Decorchemont, the ceramic artist Robert Barriot, the mosaic artist Labouret, and the sculptor Roux-Colas to create original works. The arcades along the right wall of the nave have columns with Art Deco capitals, and interior walls decorated with designs of rose-colored brick and stone placed in geometric patterns.

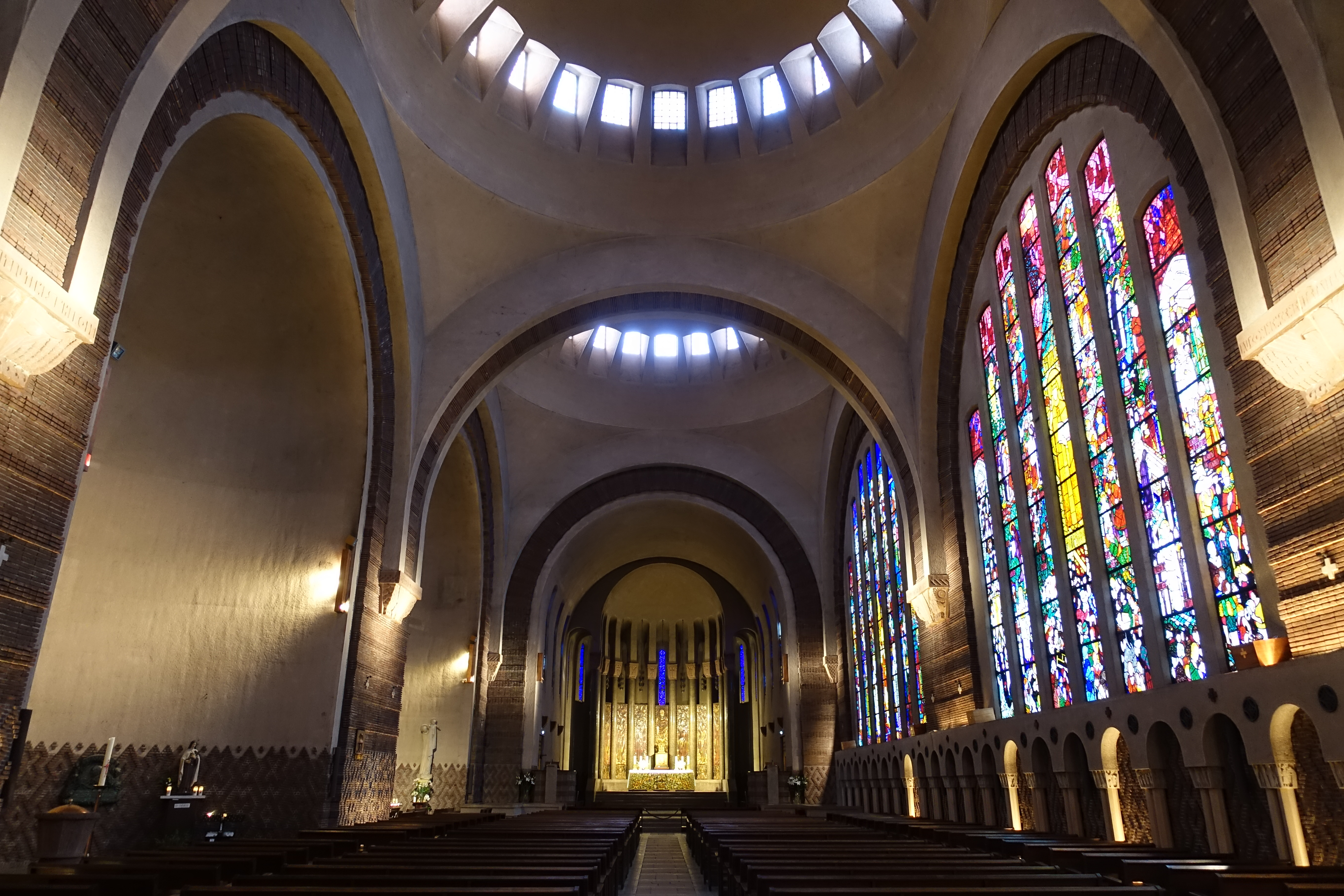
Interior, facing the sanctuary

=== Choir ===
The ceramicist Robert Barriot was in charge of the decoration of the choir. During the fifteen years that the choir was under construction, he and his family lived in the bell tower of the church. Barriot made the retable out of enamelled copper, which depicts the Seven Churches of the Apocalypse and the Twenty-Four Elders surrounding the Heavenly Father.

The altar in the choir was made by the glass craftsman Auguste Labouret (1871-1964), who did not complete it until 1953. Its decoration consists of thick pieces of coloured glass shattered into small pieces with a hammer, then shaped and composed into a sculpture which reflects light. It depicts two orange peacocks, which were a symbol of immortality in Roman catacombs, surrounded by interlaced floral designs of gray and green glass.

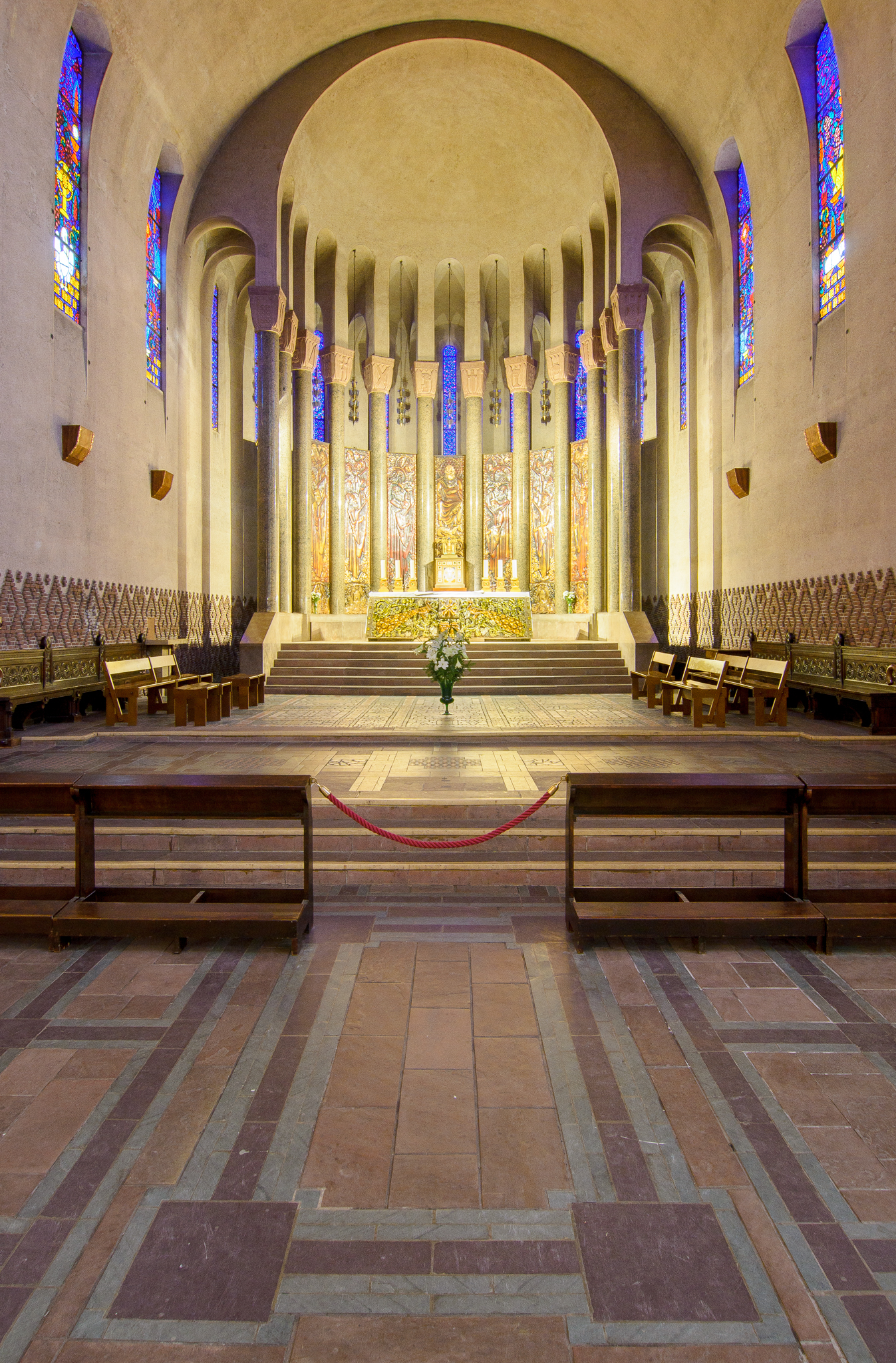
Sanctuary and choir

Atop the altar is the tabernacle, beneath a sculpture of a lamb at the feet of the Heavenly Father. Above the altar and retable are a group of narrow stained glass windows; the center window depicts Saint Odile.

=== Stained glass ===
The Art Deco stained glass is a distinctive feature of the church, created between 1935 and 1938 by Francois Decorchemont.

The glass is displayed in the three large windows in the nave. All three windows are crowded with colorful Biblical figures and events. The center windows is devoted to scenes from the life of Saint Odile (largely based on legend). The left window presents scenes from the life of Saint Raphael, and the right window presents the life of Archangel Saint Michael. These windows feature scenes depicting the Apostles spreading Christianity throughout France, and include a depiction of Saint Joan of Arc praying to Saint Michael.

Decorchement introduced several modern technical innovations in his windows. Instead of separating the pieces of glass with strips of lead, the practice of Gothic glass artists, he used cement. Instead of painting scenes on the glass in enamel paints, the common practice after the late Middle Ages, he used a much more difficult system using pate de verre made in different colors. Each piece of glass had its own distinct color. The fine details of the faces and costumes were not painted on, as in traditional stained glass, but colored with a furrow of pate de verre combined with cement.

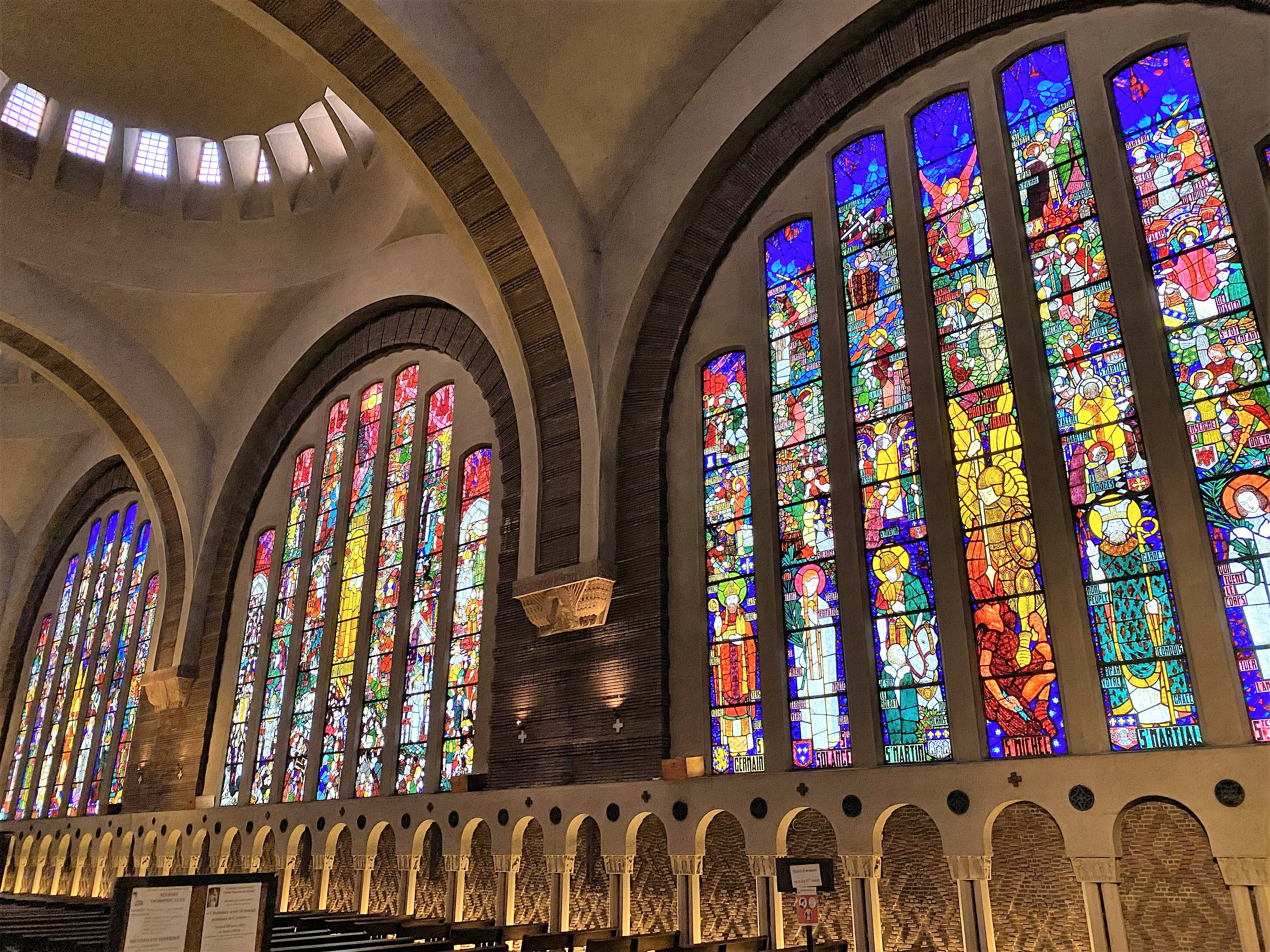
Stained-glass windows

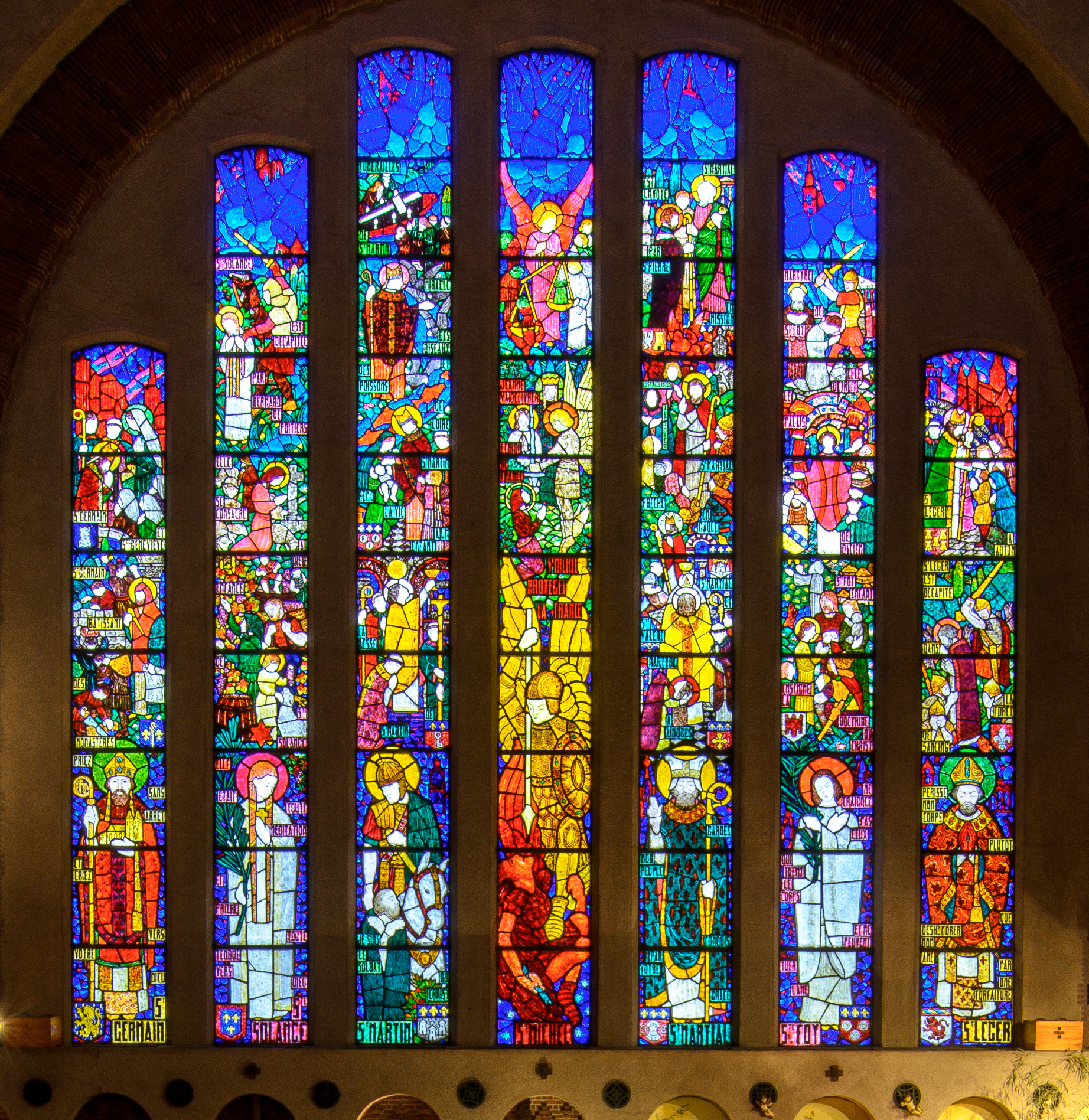
Window featuring St. Michael the Archangel

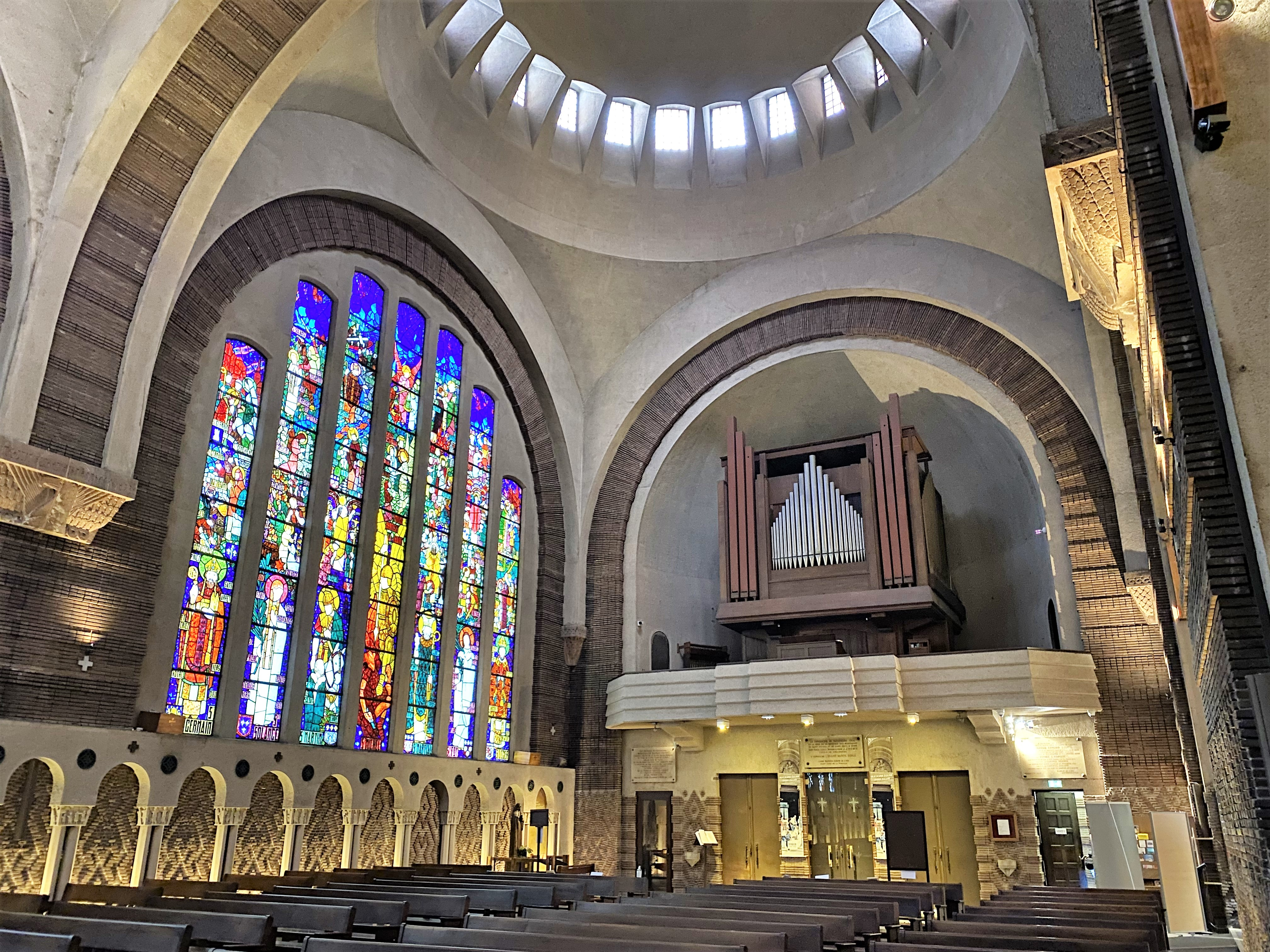
Great organ
