= Odile of Alsace =

Abbess and Christian saint

Saint Odile of Alsace
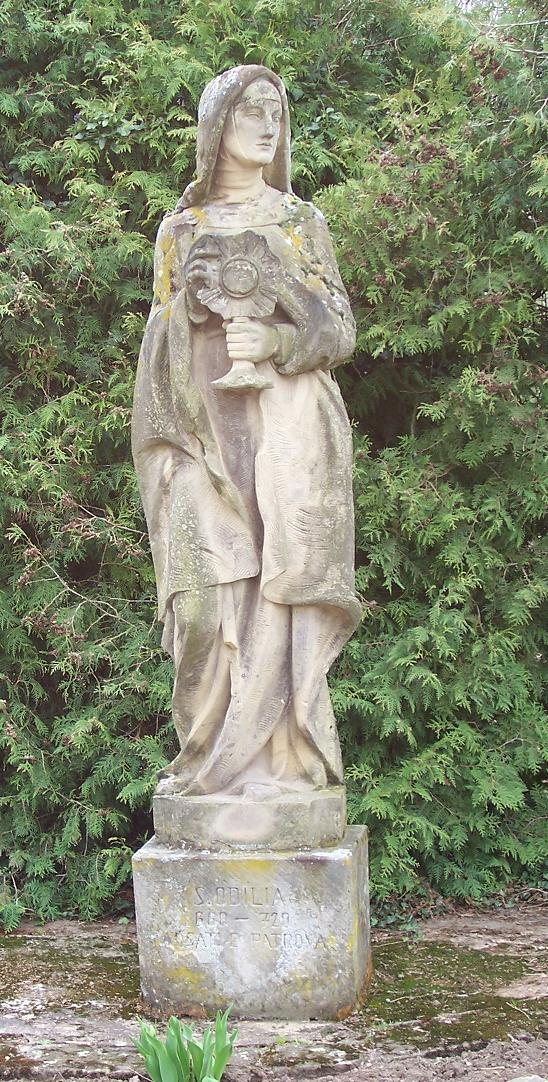
- Statue of Saint Odile in Avolsheim, Alsace

Abbess of Hohenburg Venerable Virgin
- Born: 660; Alsace, Austrasia
- Died: 720; Alsace, Kingdom of the Franks
- Venerated in: Eastern Orthodox Church; Roman Catholic Church
- Canonized: Pre-Congregation
- Feast: 13 December; 14 December (Alsace)
- Attributes: Abbess praying before an altar; woman with a book on which lie two eyes
- Patronage: the blind or partially sighted; Alsace, France

Odile of Alsace, also known as Odilia and Ottilia, born c. 662 – c. 720 at Mont Sainte-Odile), is a saint venerated in the Eastern Orthodox Church and the Roman Catholic Church. She is a patroness saint of good eyesight and of the region of Alsace.

Saint Odile is commemorated with a feast day on 13 December, and on 14 December in Alsace.

== Biography ==
Odile was the daughter of Etichon (also known as Athich, Adalrich or Aldaric), Duke of Alsace and founder of the Etichonid noble family. According to the 9th century "Life of Odilia", she was born blind. Her father did not want her because she was a girl and handicapped, so her mother Bethswinda had her brought to Palma (perhaps present day Baume-les-Dames in Burgundy), where she was raised by peasants.

A tenth-century legend relates that when she was twelve, Odile was taken into a nearby monastery. Whilst there, the itinerant bishop Erhard of Regensburg was led, by an angel it was said, to Palma where he baptised her Odile (Sol Dei), whereupon she miraculously recovered her sight. Her younger brother Hughes had her brought home again, which enraged Etichon so much that he accidentally killed his son. Odile miraculously revived him, and left home again.

She fled across the Rhine to a cave or cavern in one of two places (depending on the source: the Musbach valley near Freiburg im Breisgau, Germany, or Arlesheim near Basel, Switzerland.) Supposedly, the cliff face opened up in order to rescue her from her plight. In the cave, she hid from her father. When he tried to follow her, he was injured by falling rocks and gave up.

When Etichon fell ill, Odile returned to nurse him. He finally gave up resisting his headstrong daughter and founded the Augustine monastic community of Mont Sainte-Odile Abbey (also known as Hohenburg Abbey) for her. in the Hochwald (Hohwald), Bas-Rhin, where Odile became abbess and where Etichon was later buried. Some years later Odile was shown the site of Niedermünster at the foot of the mountain by St. John the Baptist in a vision. There she founded a second monastery, including a hospital. Here, the head and an arm of St. Lazarus of Marseille were displayed but later transferred to Andlau. The buildings of the Niedermünster burned down in 1542, but the local well is still said to cure eye diseases.

St. Odile died around 720 at the convent of Niedermünster. At the insistent prayers of her sisters she was returned to life, but after describing the beauties of the afterlife to them, she took communion by herself and died again. She was buried at Ste. Odile. She was succeeded as abbess of Mont Sainte-Odile Abbey by her niece, Saint Eugenia of Alsace.

== Veneration ==
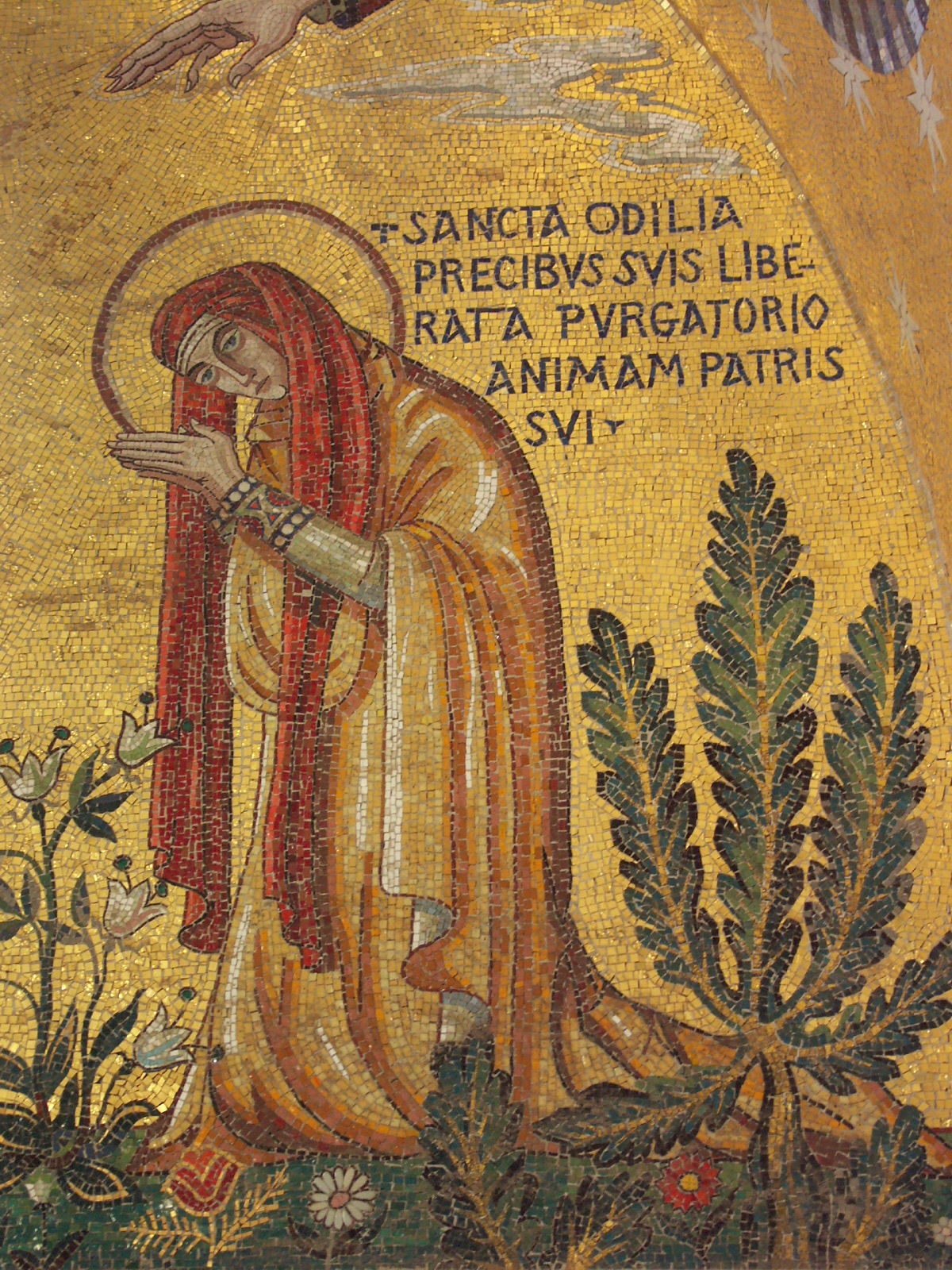
A depiction of St. Odile in Mont Sainte-Odile, Alsace, France.

The cult of St. Odile spread rapidly, and spread outside France to Germany. She was mentioned in the litanies of Freising, Utrecht and Ratisbon at least from the 9th century. Amongst the common people, pilgrimages to her shrine were popular, and were by no means limited to the masses; from Charlemagne onwards, emperors also conducted pilgrimages in her honour. Indeed, Charlemagne granted immunity to the convent at Hohenberg, which was later officially ratified by Louis the Pious on 9 March 837.

By the 14th century, Odile's cult had grown so strong that her relics were split and removed to Corbie, Prague and Einsiedeln. She enjoyed especial popularity in Strasbourg. The strength of her cult is supposed to have been a result of her patronage of the blind and partially sighted, which was especially pertinent in a time before the invention of spectacles.

St. Odile was long considered the patron of Alsace and eye patients, at least since before the 16th century; however, this was made official in 1807 by pope Pius VII. Her feast day is 13 December.

== Cultural representations ==
As the patroness of ocular afflictions and ear diseases, St. Odile is often depicted with a pair of eyes on a book – particularly fine examples of such images can be found from the 14th–16th centuries. A notable sculpture of her exists at the Bavarian National Museum in Munich, which portrays the event of her baptism. The larkspur is connected to St. Odile as well and is believed to cure eye diseases in popular medicine and superstition.

A Life of St. Odilia was written about the 10th century, mostly dedicated to the retelling of her legend, the antagonism of her father, and the death of her brother Hughes. From internal evidence, it seems that it was based upon an earlier, 8th century Life; however, as an account of her life, it cannot be considered to have much historical validity.

== Legacy ==
Mont Sainte-Odile and Sint Odiliënberg, is named for her.

=== Places dedicated to Saint Odile ===
==== St. Odile pilgrim's chapel, near Freiburg ====
In the valley of the Musbach, a small river that runs near Freiburg in Breisgau, pilgrims have venerated St. Odile for centuries. In ca. 1300 a chapel was built; the present church was started in 1503 and finished in the 18th century. The church is built adjacent to a spring whose water contains radon, which was wrongly thought to be beneficial to eyesight. In the 18th century the spring became part of the church building: in 1714 the source was included by enlarging the building, in 1780 the cave with the source in it was renovated and decorated in the fanciful style of the time.

==== Places where she had been ====
- Barr, Bas-Rhin, Alsace, France
- Freiburg, Baden-Württemberg, Germany: St. Odile's Church
- Arlesheim, Basel-Landschaft, Switzerland

==== Other places ====
- Absberg, Bavaria, Germany (St. Odile's Church (in German))
- Bandung, Indonesia (Santa Odilia's Parish Church (in Indonesian))
- Bettringen, Schwäbisch Gmünd, Baden-Württemberg, Germany (St. Odile's Church (in German))
- Buttisholz, Canton of Lucerne, Switzerland (St. Odile's chapel (in German))
- Eppingen, Baden-Württemberg, Germany (St. Odile's Mountain (in German))
- Fehren, Canton of Solothurn, Switzerland (St. Odile's Church (in German))
- Gohr, Dormagen, North Rhine-Westphalia, Germany (St. Odile's Church (in German))
- Graz, Styria, Austria (St. Odile's Institute for the Blind (in German))
- Hofen, Bönnigheim, Baden-Württemberg, Germany (St. Odile's Church (in German))
- Kersbach, Forchheim, Bavaria, Germany (St. Odile's Church (in German))
- Lörrach, Baden-Württemberg, Germany (St. Odile's Church (in German))
- Losheim am See, Saarland, Germany
- Möschenfeld (Grasbrunn), Bavaria, Germany: St. Odile's Church (in German))
- Offenhausen, Bavaria, Germany (St. Odile's Chapel (in German))
- Paris, France, Sainte-Odile, Paris
- Plochingen, Baden-Württemberg, Germany (St Odile's Chapel (in German))
- Randegg (Gottmadingen, Baden-Württemberg, Germany (St. Odile's Church (in German))
- Sankt Ottilien, Eresing, Bavaria, Germany (Abbey St. Odile (in German))
- Schorndorf, Baden-Württemberg, Germany (St. Odile's Mountain (in German))
- Stuttgart-Münster, Baden-Württemberg, Germany (St. Odile's Church (in German))
- Tangerang Regency, Indonesia (Citra Raya Parish Church of Santa Odilia (in Indonesian))
- Walzenhausen, Appenzell Ausserrhoden, Switzerland
- Wengen, Burgheim, Bavaria, Germany (St. Odile's Church (in German))

== Gallery ==
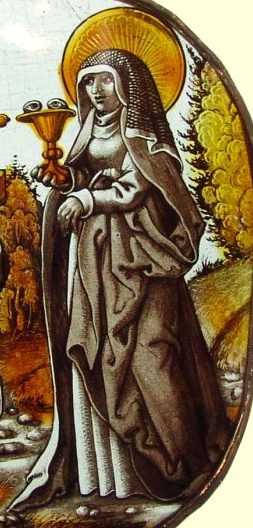
St. Odile, with a pair of eyes in a chalice. Stained glass from c. 1500.

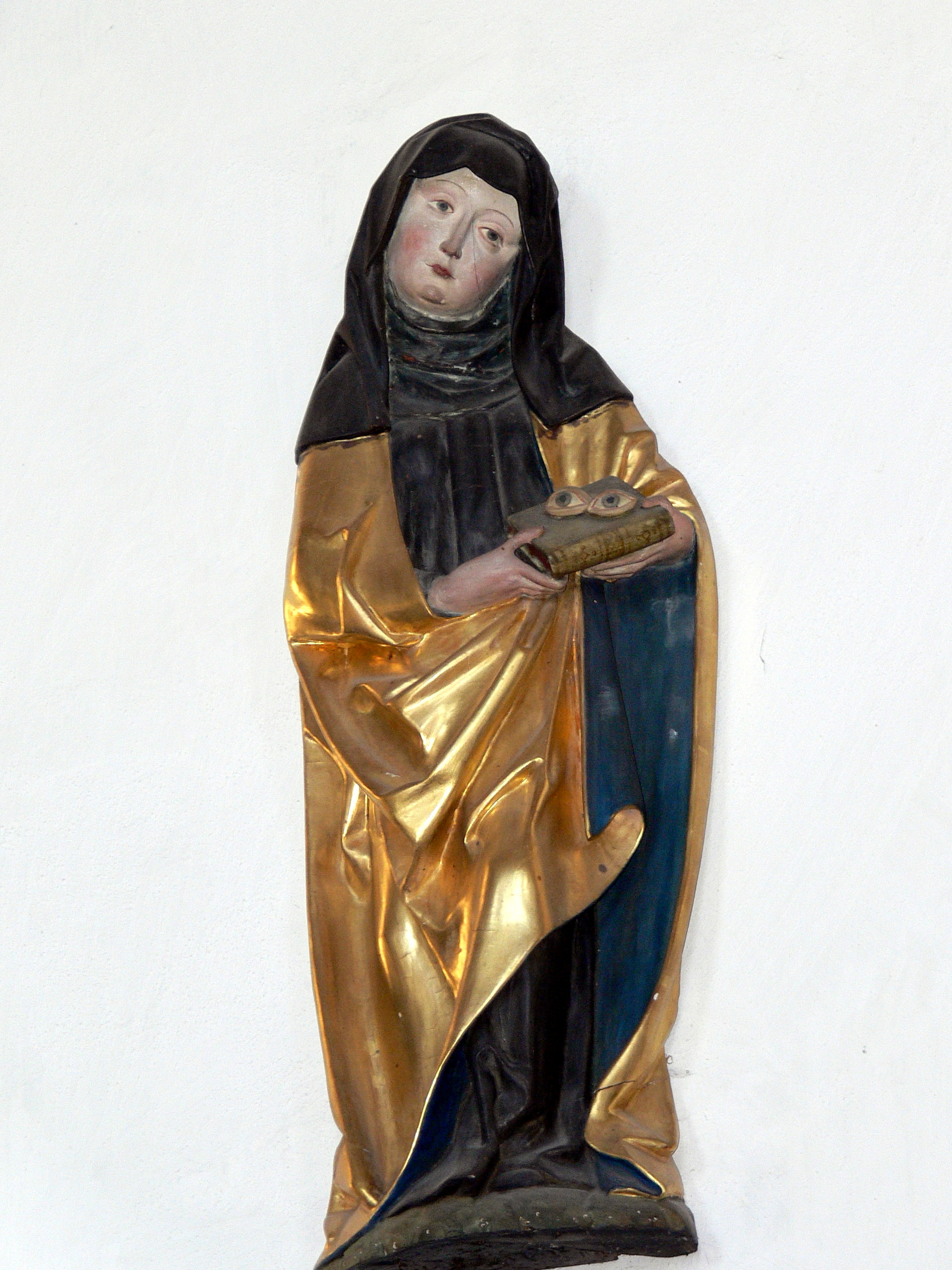
Relief from St James parish church in Abenberg, Germany

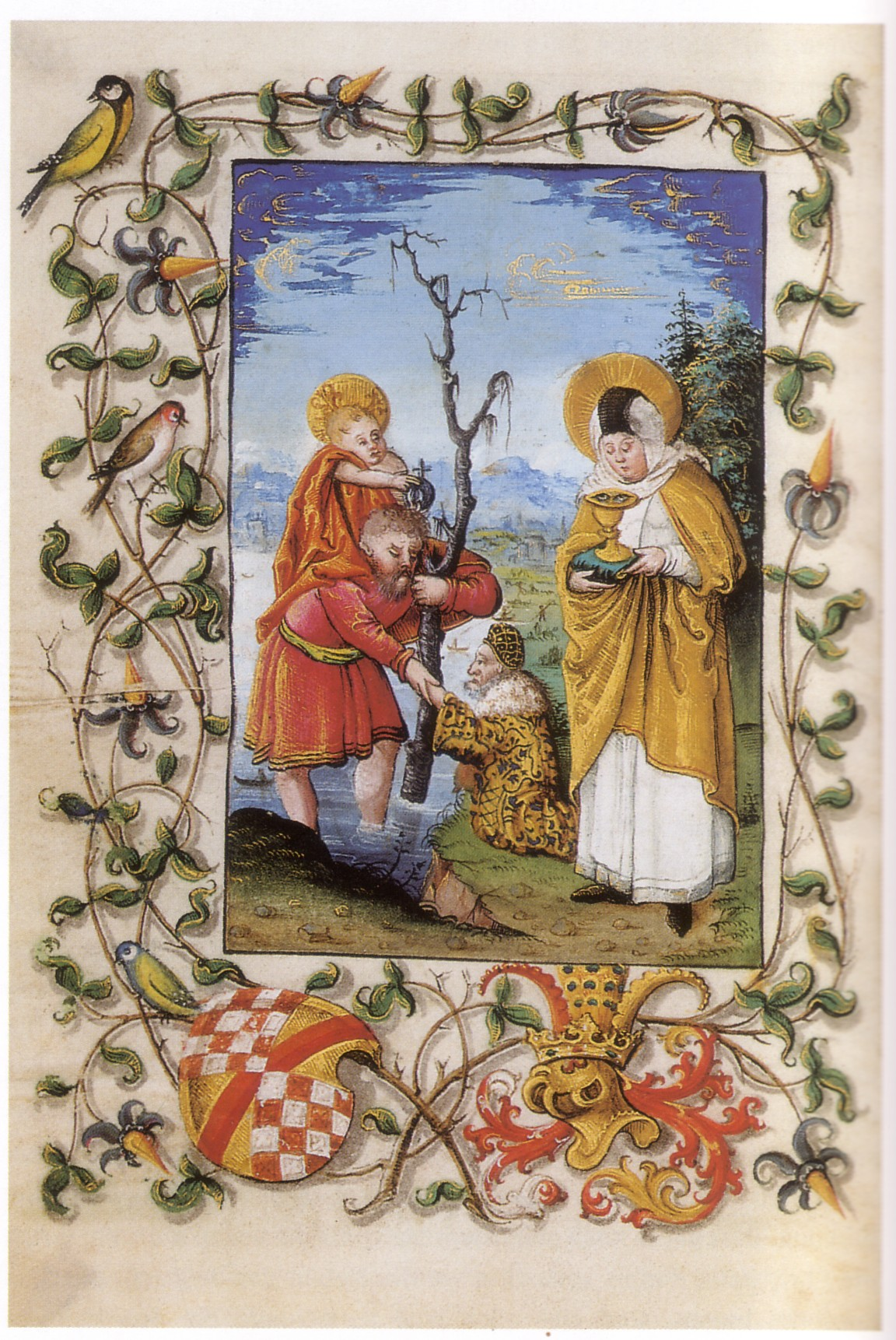
St. Odile depicted with St Christopher. Illumination from the Book of Hours of Christopher I, Margrave of Baden-Baden, c. 1519.

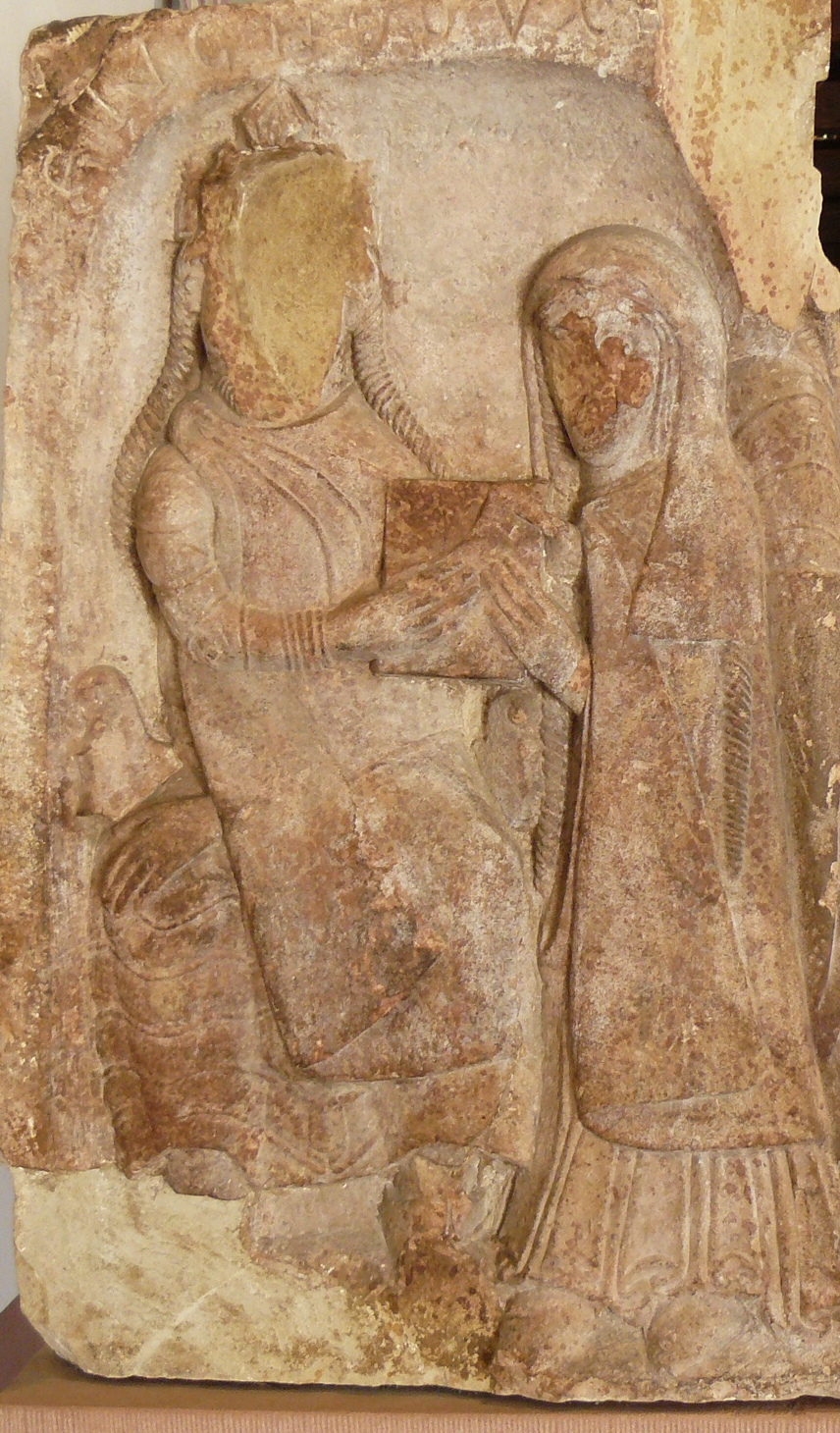
Twelfth century stele depicting Duke Aldaric delivering the deeds of the abbey to his daughter. Defaced during the French Revolution. From Mont Sainte-Odile.

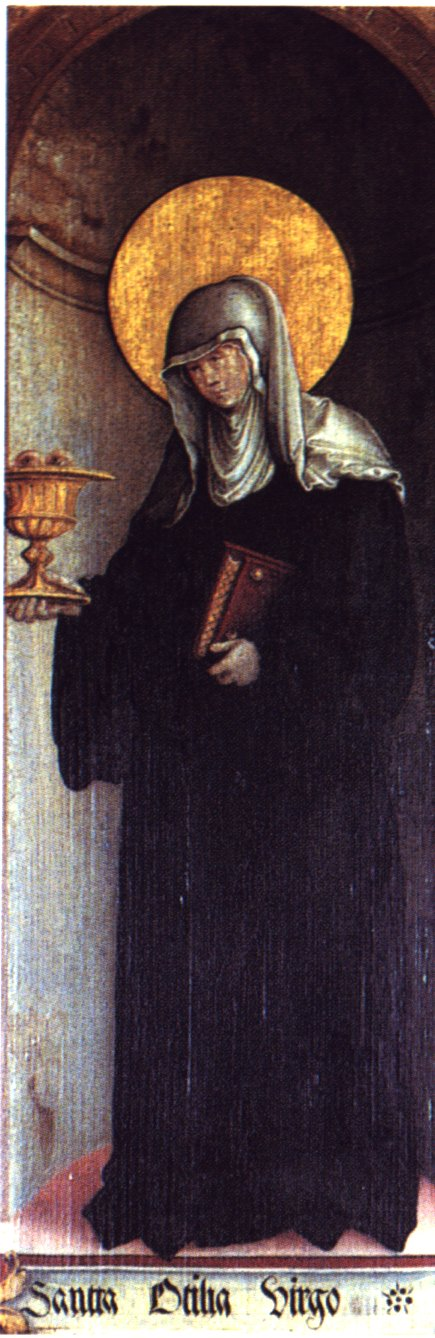
St. Odile as portrayed by the Master of Meßkirch, c. 1535–40

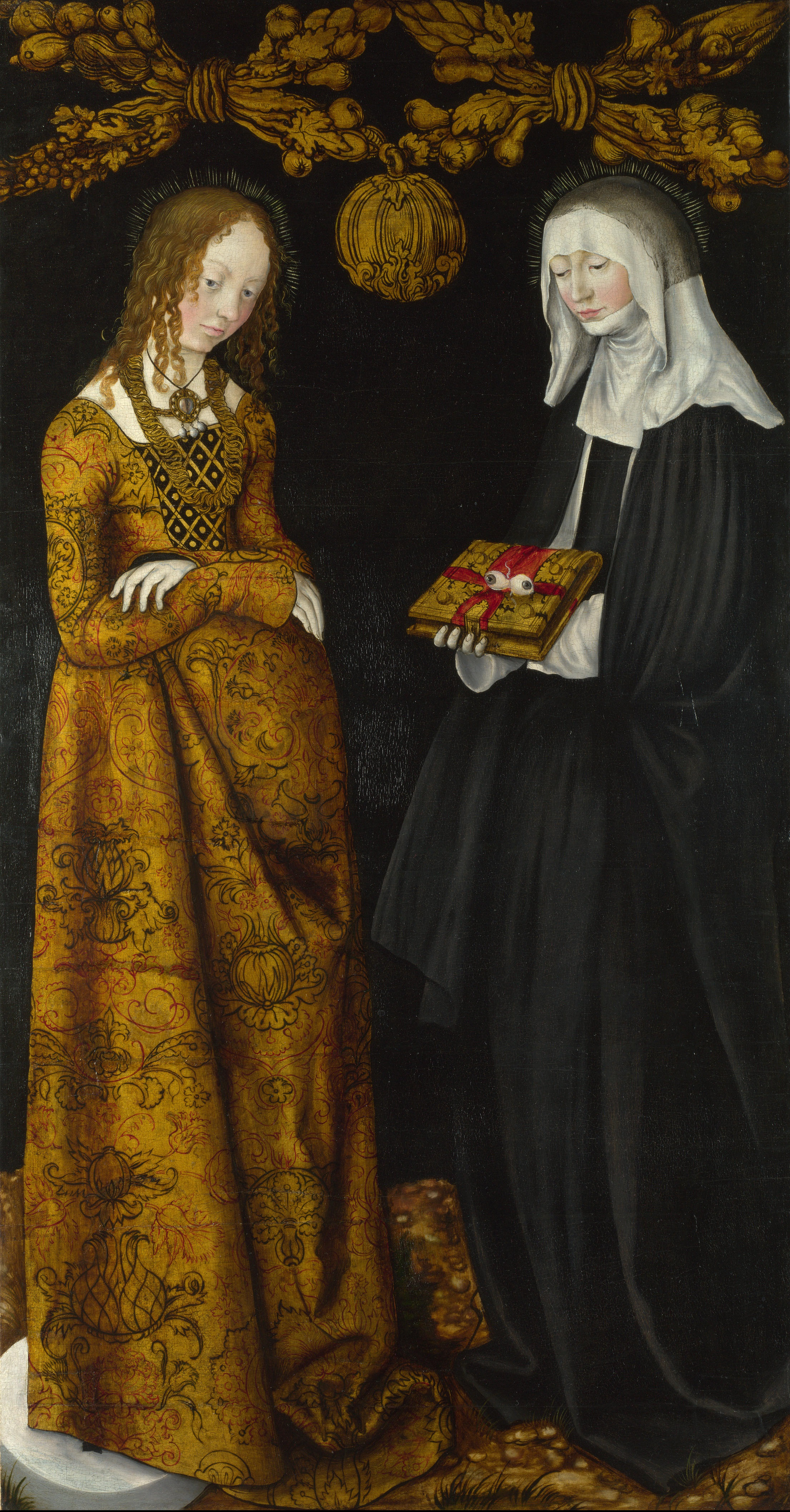
1506. Saints Christina and Ottilia by Lucas Cranach the Elder (1472–1553)

== See also ==
- Etichonids
- Adalrich, Duke of Alsace
- 401 Ottilia
