= Mount Aubert de la Rue =

Hill in Heard Island

Mount Aubert de la Rue (53°1′S 73°22′E) is an ice-free hill, 125 metres (410 ft) high, standing at the south end and surmounting the low Fidelia Isthmus that connects Laurens Peninsula with the main mass of Heard Island. It was first charted and named by Edgar Aubert de la Rue, French geologist aboard the whale catcher of the island in January 1929, and later surveyed by the Australian National Antarctic Research Expeditions in 1948.
