= Musbach valley =

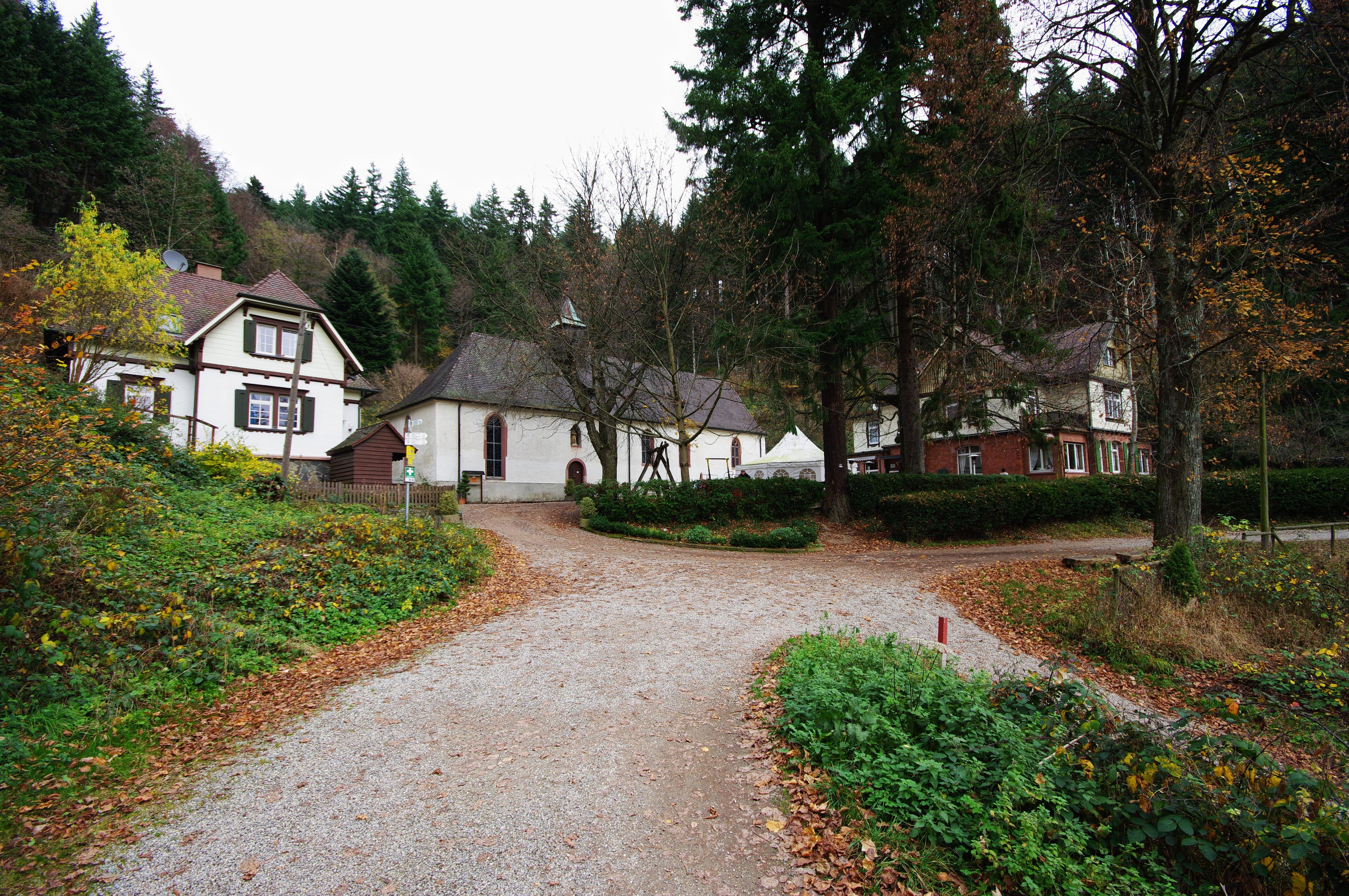
- St. Ottilien in the Musbach valley. The sacristan's house (left), the church with the chapel and the spring (center), the former sexton's house (right)
- Long-axis direction: North-South

Geography
- Coordinates: 48°0′10″N 7°53′57″E
- Interactive map of Musbach valley

The Musbachtal is a small 2.6 km long steep and narrow carved valley with a creek at the bottom.

== Location and geography ==
The valley stretches from the Carthusian monastery in Freiburg im Breisgau (Baden-Württemberg, Germany) to below the summit of the Roßkopf (Black Forest). It is a side valley of the Dreisam valley and is heavily vegetated with mixed forest. It begins below the Rosskopf summit at an altitude of 463 m and ends in Freiburg's suburb Waldsee (forest lake) at an altitude of 320 m. There is also the Vogelsanghütte (birdsong hut).

== Pilgrimage ==
The beginnings of the pilgrimage through the Musbach valley were between the 7th and the 13th centuries and it had its heyday in the 16th century. Through the lower part of the valley runs a way of the cross which ends at the end of the valley at the St. Odile chapel. In the 18th century eight stations of the cross were erected by Wolfgang Kleiser on the footpath which starts at the Kartäuserstraße (Carthusian street) and ends at the upper end of the valley in a clearing. These stations were renovated in 2003.
