= Fidèle Dimou =

Congolese politician

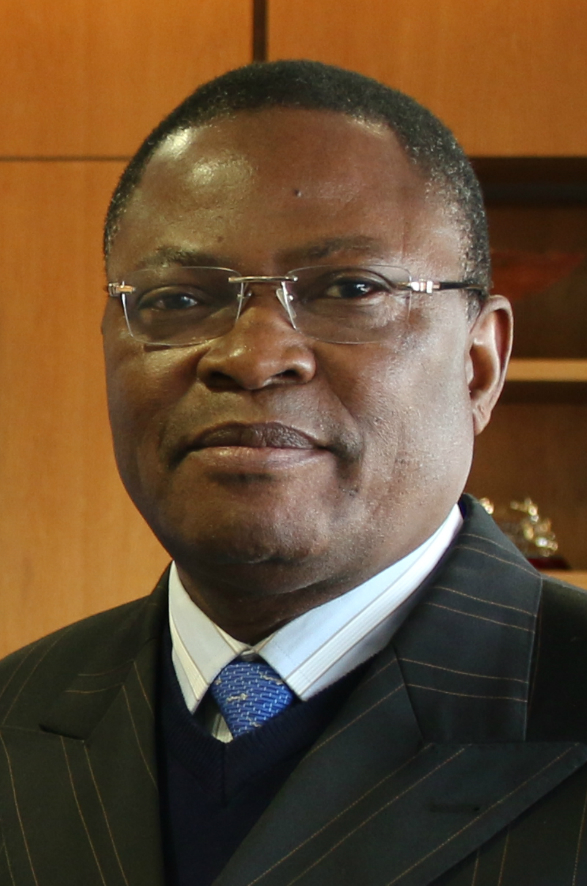
Dimou in 2019.

Fidèle Dimou (born 21 September 1957) is a Congolese politician who has served in the government of Congo-Brazzaville as Minister of Transport since 2017. Previously he was Prefect of Kouilou Department from 2006 to 2017.

== Life and career ==
Born in the Mossaka District of Cuvette Department in 1957, Dimou was Director-General of the Civil Service from 1998 to 2004. Subsequently, he was chief of staff for the Vice-President of the Constitutional Court from 2004 to 2006, while also working as Consultant to the Secretariat-General of the Government during the same period.

After the major city and port of Pointe-Noire—which had been capital of Kouilou Department—was split off into its own department, the Prefect of Kouilou, Alexandre Honoré Paka, was moved to the newly created post of Prefect of Pointe-Noire, while Dimou was appointed to replace him as Prefect of Kouilou on 18 January 2006. Dimou was installed as prefect by the Minister of Territorial Administration, François Ibovi, at a ceremony held in Madingo-Kayes in April 2006.

At the Sixth Extraordinary Congress of the Congolese Labour Party (PCT), held in July 2011, Dimou was elected to the PCT's 471-member Central Committee.

After more than 11 years as Prefect of Kouilou, Dimou was appointed to the government as Minister of Transport, Civil Aviation and the Merchant Marine on 22 August 2017.
