= 524 Fidelio =

Main-belt asteroid

Discovery
- Discovered by: Max Wolf
- Discovery site: Heidelberg
- Discovery date: 14 March 1904

Designations
- Alternative designations: 1904 NN

Orbital characteristics
- Epoch 31 July 2016 (JD 2457600.5)
- Uncertainty parameter 0
- Observation arc: 112.10 yr (40943 d)
- Aphelion: 2.9726 AU (444.69 Gm)
- Perihelion: 2.2965 AU (343.55 Gm)
- Semi-major axis: 2.6345 AU (394.12 Gm)
- Eccentricity: 0.12832
- Orbital period (sidereal): 4.28 yr (1561.9 d)
- Mean anomaly: 195.412°
- Mean motion: 0° 13^{m} 49.764^{s} / day
- Inclination: 8.2284°
- Longitude of ascending node: 326.697°
- Argument of perihelion: 80.137°

Physical characteristics
- Mean diameter: 67 ± 3 km 66 ± 5 km (alternate pole solution)
- Synodic rotation period: 14.171042 ± 0.000005 h 14.171031 ± 0.000005 h (alternate pole solution)
- Pole ecliptic longitude: 186° ± 25° 52° ± 50° (alternate pole solution)
- Pole ecliptic latitude: 54° ± 10° 76° ± 6° (alternate pole solution)
- Geometric albedo: 0.0402±0.003
- Absolute magnitude (H): 9.83

524 Fidelio is a large minor planet with a diameter of 71 km, orbiting the Sun near the center of the main asteroid belt. Fidelio contains both metals and carbon (Spectral class XC). Concerning its name, the Catalogue of Minor Planet Names and Discovery Circumstances notes, "This is the name of Leonora when disguised as a man in the opera Fidelio (composed 1805) by the German composer Ludwig van Beethoven. The name dates from a period when Max Wolf assigned the names of female operatic characters to asteroids he had newly discovered.

524 Fidelio is also the name of a song on the album Valentina by The Wedding Present.
