= Fidelis Justin Rasolonomenjanahary =

Malagasy politician

Fidelis Justin Rasolonomenjanahary is a Malagasy politician. A member of the National Assembly of Madagascar, he was elected as a member of the Tiako I Madagasikara party in the 2007 Malagasy parliamentary elections. He was reelected in 2013 Malagasy general elections and he represents the constituency of Ambohimahasoa.
