= Fidel =

Fidel most commonly refers to:

- Fidel Castro (1926–2016), Cuban communist revolutionary and politician
- Fidel V. Ramos (1928–2022), Filipino politician and former president

Fidel may also refer to:

== Other persons ==
- Fidel (given name)

== Film ==
- Fidel (2002 film), a 2002 mini-series by David Attwood about Castro
- Fidel (2009 film), a 2009 Filipino indie film
- Fidel: The Untold Story, a 2001 a documentary about Castro

== Other uses ==
- Fidel, the letters of the Geʽez script used in Ethiopia and Eritrea
- Vielle, a musical instrument and forerunner of the fiddle, also known as a fidel or a viuola
- Fidel (imprint), an imprint of VDM Publishing devoted to the reproduction of Wikipedia content

== See also ==
- Fidèle (disambiguation)
