= St. Odile (Freiburg) =

Coordinates: 48°00′11″N 7°53′58″E

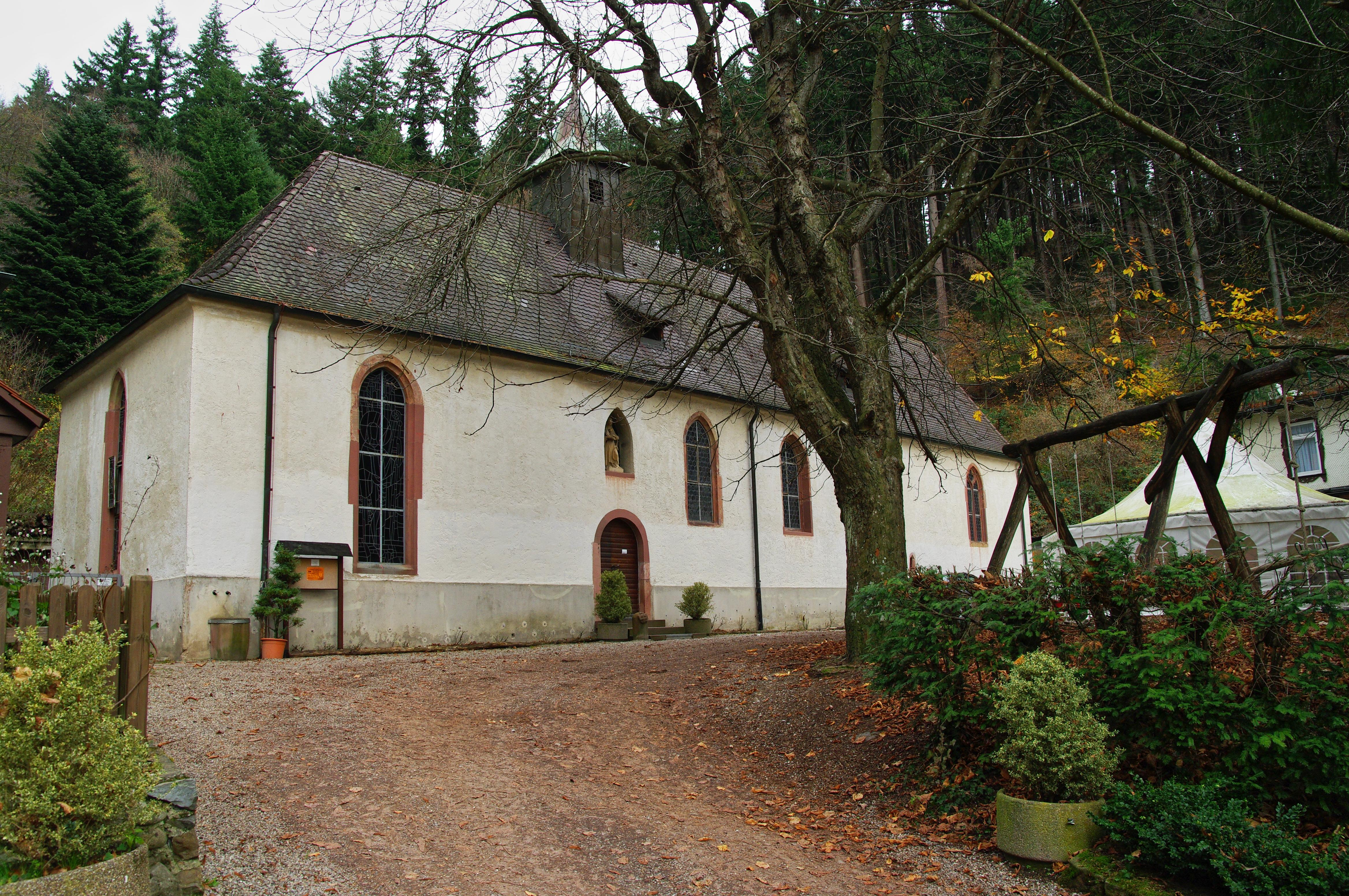
Freiburg, St. Odile

St. Odile is a forest sanctuary in Freiburg's suburb Waldsee. It is located at a height of 480 m in a forest clearing in the upper St. Odile ravine in the municipal forest of Freiburg at the southern slope of the Roßkopf at a distance of approximately 750 m from St. Wendelin.

== History ==
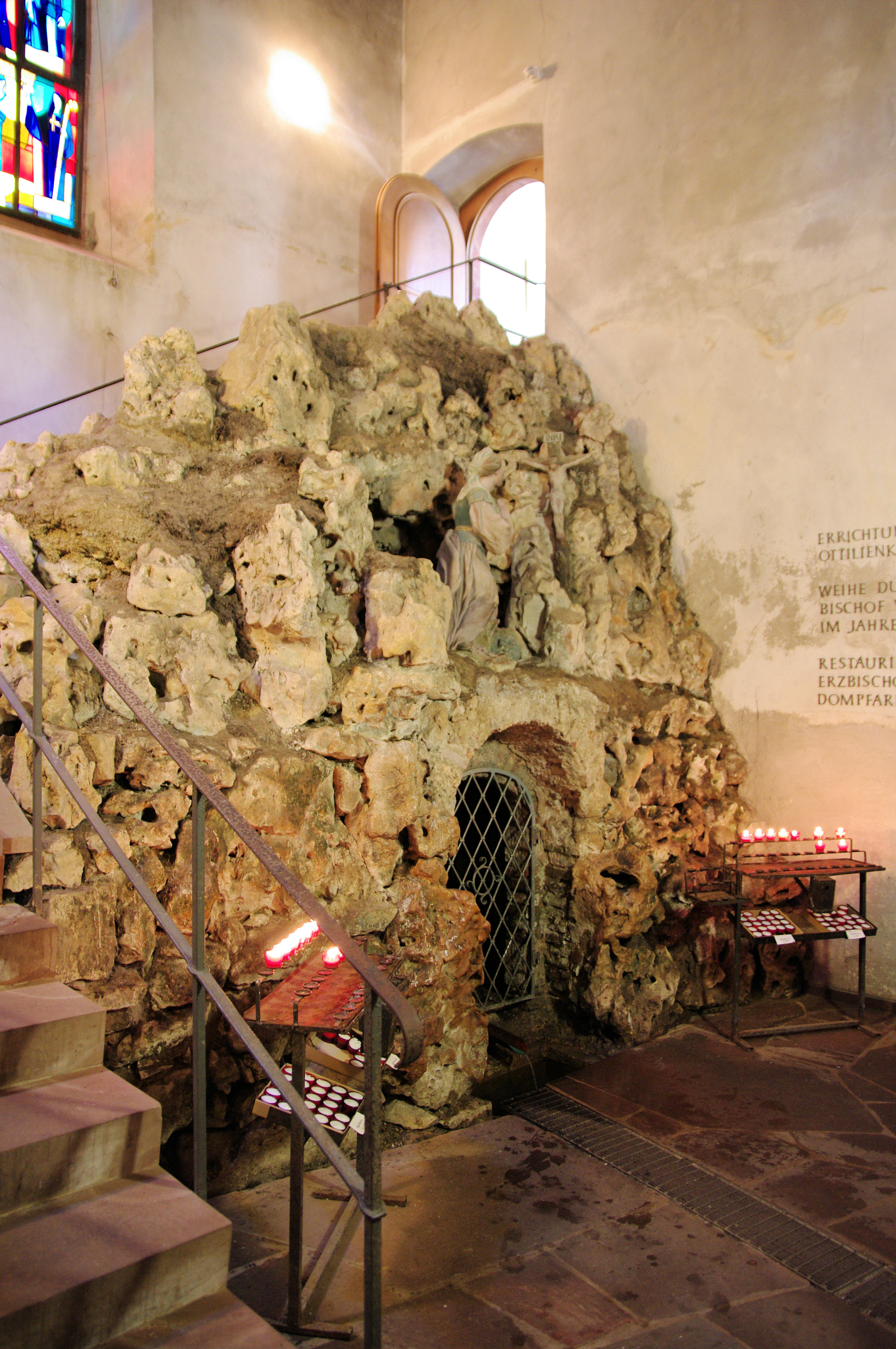
Saint Odile spring in the chapel

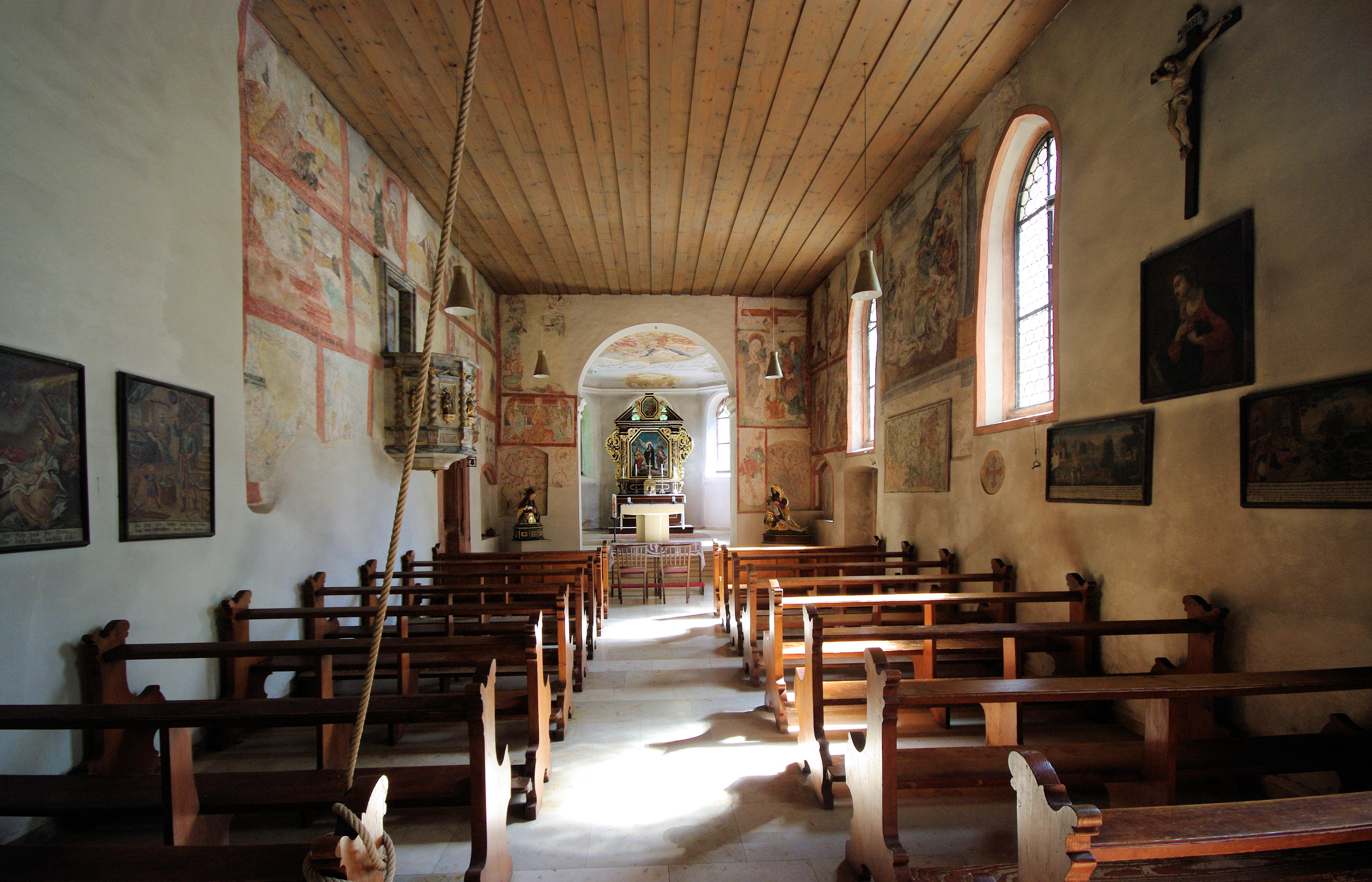
Interior of the chapel

It is one of the oldest pilgrimage destinations in Germany. The chapel is consecrated to Saint Odile. She is usually depicted with an abbess bar and a book on which two or three eyes are lying, indicating that she was born blind and is believed to cure eye diseases. The church was built over a spring whose water contains radon which is said to alleviate eye diseases. It is open to the public.

The first chapel stood at this place in 679 (in accordance with the information board in the chapel). In around 1100 a new chapel was built. In 1503 Peter Sprung, councillor of Freiburg, and his wife Elizabeth Zehenderin donated the reconstruction of the church. The consecration took place in 1505. Several wars severely damaged the church, during the Thirty Years' War from 1632 onwards it was looted several times by the Swedes. In 1648 it was repaired. The altar structures were installed in 1663/64. At the siege of Freiburg by the Duke of Villars in 1713 it was so badly damaged that it had to be extensively rebuilt in 1714. At the same time it was extended towards the west and the up to then freestanding Saint Odile spring was integrated into the building. The last restoration took place in 1966/1967. On that occasion magnificent medieval frescoes were uncovered.

The pilgrimage reached its peak in the 16th century, the beginnings of the pilgrimage were between the 7th and 13th centuries.

The dissolution ordered in Vienna in 1770 could be averted from the hermitages and forest sanctuaries St. Odile, St. Wendelin, St. Valentine and the Loretto Chapel. Later, the closure of all subsidiary churches and chapels was ordered by an imperial decree of 1783. The estates of the chapels should be ceded in 1788 to the parish Horben. The protest of the citizens was successful: In 1791 came the decision that St. Odile could be reopened. With a reference to this decree the attempted closure by the Badish government in 1807 could be averted as well. The new friary was built in 1885/86 and in 1888 the present inn built as a successor of that building which was destroyed by fire. The site was linked in 1885 by a driveway (car-free), a further connection by a footpath from the cannon-place on the castle mountain above downtown Freiburg was added in 1903. It can also be reached by car from the Kartäuserstraße. Moreover, a way of the cross leads through the St. Odile ravine, also from the Kartäuserstraße, to the chapel.

== See also ==
- List of religious buildings in Freiburg
- Places dedicated to Saint Odile
