= Fidélis (footballer, born 1944) =

Brazilian football player and coach

Personal information
- Full name: José Maria Fidélis dos Santos
- Date of birth: 13 March 1944
- Place of birth: São José dos Campos (SP), Brazil
- Date of death: 28 November 2012 (aged 68)
- Place of death: São José dos Campos (SP), Brazil
- Position: Right-back

Senior career*
Years	Team	Apps	(Gls)
1963–1968	Bangu		
1967	→ Houston Stars (loan)		
1969–1975	Vasco da Gama		
1975	America		
1976–1977	ABC		
1978	Operário-MS		
1979–1981	São José-SP		

International career
1966	Brazil		

Managerial career
- 1989–1990: Guarani de Divinópolis
- * Club domestic league appearances and goals

José Maria Fidélis dos Santos (13 March 1944 – 28 November 2012), known as just Fidélis, was a Brazilian football player and coach, who played as a right-back.

Santos was born in São José dos Campos (SP). He played for the following clubs: Bangu, Vasco, América-RJ, Corinthians, ABC, Operário-MS and São José-SP. He earned 8 caps (1 non-official) for the Brazil national team, and was part of the team at the 1966 FIFA World Cup.

On 28 November 2012, he died in his hometown São José do Campos from stomach cancer.

== Honours ==
Bangu

- Campeonato Carioca: 1966

Vasco da Gama

- Campeonato Carioca: 1970
- Campeonato Brasileiro: 1974

ABC

- Campeonato Potiguar: 1976
