= Fidelia Heard =

Surveyor of Heard Island and kindergarten teacher

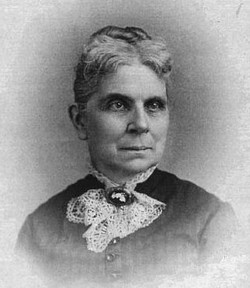
Fidelia Heard

Fidelia Reed Heard (August 13, 1822 – February 22, 1895) was an American captain's wife who made important initial contributions to research on Heard Island, an Antarctic island, now part of Australia's Territory of Heard Island and McDonald Islands. The island is named for her husband, Captain John Jay Heard, who alongside Fidelia is credited with first spotting the landmass on November 25, 1853. The island's Fidelia Isthmus is named for Fidelia herself.

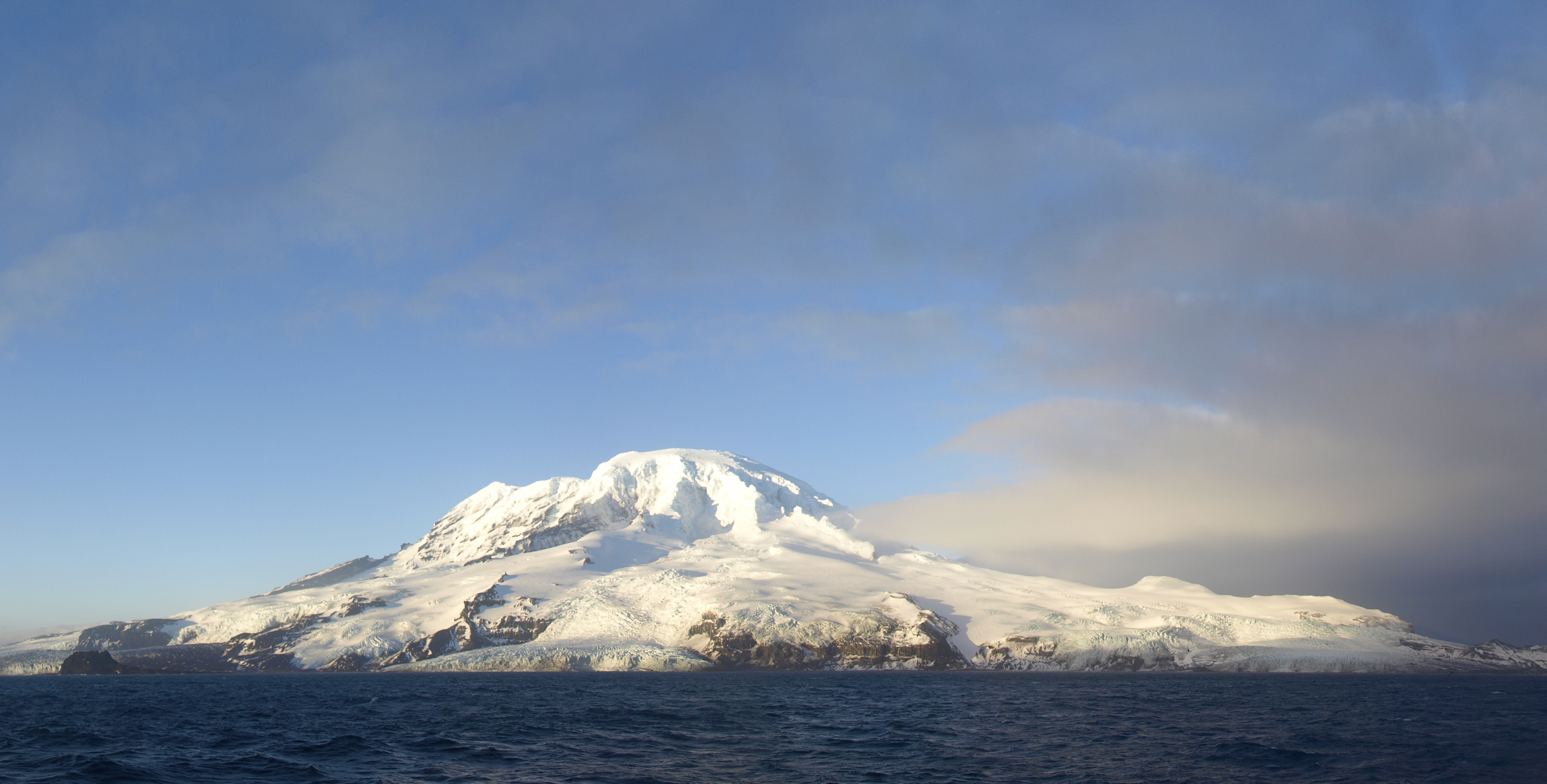
A view of Heard Island from a boat.

Fidelia was born in Easton, Massachusetts, in 1822. She traveled with her husband on the merchant vessel Oriental from Boston to Melbourne in 1853. The two had recently married, a few years after the death of John's first wife, and the trip was treated as their honeymoon. On the voyage, she began assisting the captain and learned to take maritime measurements. She kept a detailed journal of her journey, which became a central historical record of the initial discovery of what would later be named Heard Island. Together, she and her husband were the first to observe the remote island, and she provided the first written description of it:

"At 10 o'clock the Captain was walking on deck and saw what he supposed to be an immense iceberg. … the atmosphere was hazy, and then a heavy snow squall came up which shut it out entirely from our view. Not long after the sun shone again, and I went up again and with the glass, tried to get an outline of it to sketch its form. The sun seemed so dazzling on the water, and the tops of the apparent icebergs covered with snow; the outline was very indistinct. We were all the time nearing the object and on looking again the Captain pronounced it to be land. The Island is not laid down on the chart, neither is it in the Epitome, so we are perhaps the discoverers, … I think it must be a twin to Desolation Island, it is certainly a frigid looking place."

Fidelia also made the first known drawings of the landform. Transcripts of her journal and the log book of the Oriental were donated by her grandson, Joseph Jay Heard, and Hubert Wilkins to the American Geographical Society in the early 1930s. A 1990 expedition to the island found that Fidelia's initial survey "proved remarkably accurate." The research material she compiled on their voyage has continued to be used by scholars, and it is now held in the Scott Polar Research Institute Archives at the University of Cambridge.

Captain Heard's mental health deteriorated and he died on October 13, 1862, at the Boston Lunatic Asylum. His cause of death was recorded as "mania (four years)." Fidelia, with two young children to provide for, turned to teaching. A notice placed in the Boston Evening Transcript in 1860 advertised a "Vacation school for Misses and small children, will be kept by Mrs. J. J. Heard, in Concord Hall during the summer vacation [...] Terms fifty cents per week." By 1861, she was running a kindergarten with the patronage of Rev. Dr. Edward Everett Hale.

Although Elizabeth Peabody, who lectured and wrote extensively on early childhood education, is usually credited with opening the first kindergarten in Boston, the Boston Evening Transcript, in an article published soon after Mrs. Heard's death in 1895, acknowledged her as the "pioneer" of the kindergarten movement:

Although never claiming recognition for herself, and happy in her own memories of the early history of the establishment of this system in America, and glad to have others win honors and fame for their share in this great work, yet her name is inseparably connected with this movement, and must be spoken with tender reverence as the pioneer in this great revolution in the methods in the training of young children and in the establishment of the kindergarten here.

In 1860, thirty-five years ago, in the midst of a sad bereavement in which she was forced to provide for her children, she made known to a few friends her plans, which had been slowly maturing, for the opening of a school in Boston, in which she had wrought out the germs of the system which has now taken its place as the true method in all primary education.

These plans were then made known to Dr. Hale, but not until then did she know that the whole scheme had already been wrought out and reduced to a science by Froebel in Germany. With great enthusiasm she provided herself with the English translations of his text books, mastered them, and, through the interest and sympathy of Dr. Hale, a school was started, the first kindergarten in America.
