= Fidelia Isthmus =

The Fidelia Isthmus (53.02173°S 73.36812°E) is an isthmus that connects the Laurens Peninsula with the rest of Heard Island, a subantarctic territory of Australia in the southern Indian Ocean. Mount Aubert de la Rue looms over it.

The isthmus is named after Fidelia Heard, the wife of John J. Heard, who is credited with discovering Heard Island as captain of the merchant ship Oriental on November 25, 1853. Fidelia Heard made the first known drawings of the island.

A 2016 expedition to Heard Island found that the isthmus had been breached by two channels, further separating the Laurens Peninsula (also known as "Red Island").
