= Saint Fidelis =

Saint Fidelis may refer to:

- Fidelis of Como (San Fedele) (died ca. 304 AD), Italian soldier-saint
- Fidelis of Sigmaringen (1577-1622), Capuchin friar martyred in the Counter-Reformation
- Basilica of St. Fidelis, the Cathedral of the Plains
