= Panorama Developments (Guildford) Ltd v Fidelis Furnishing Fabrics Ltd =

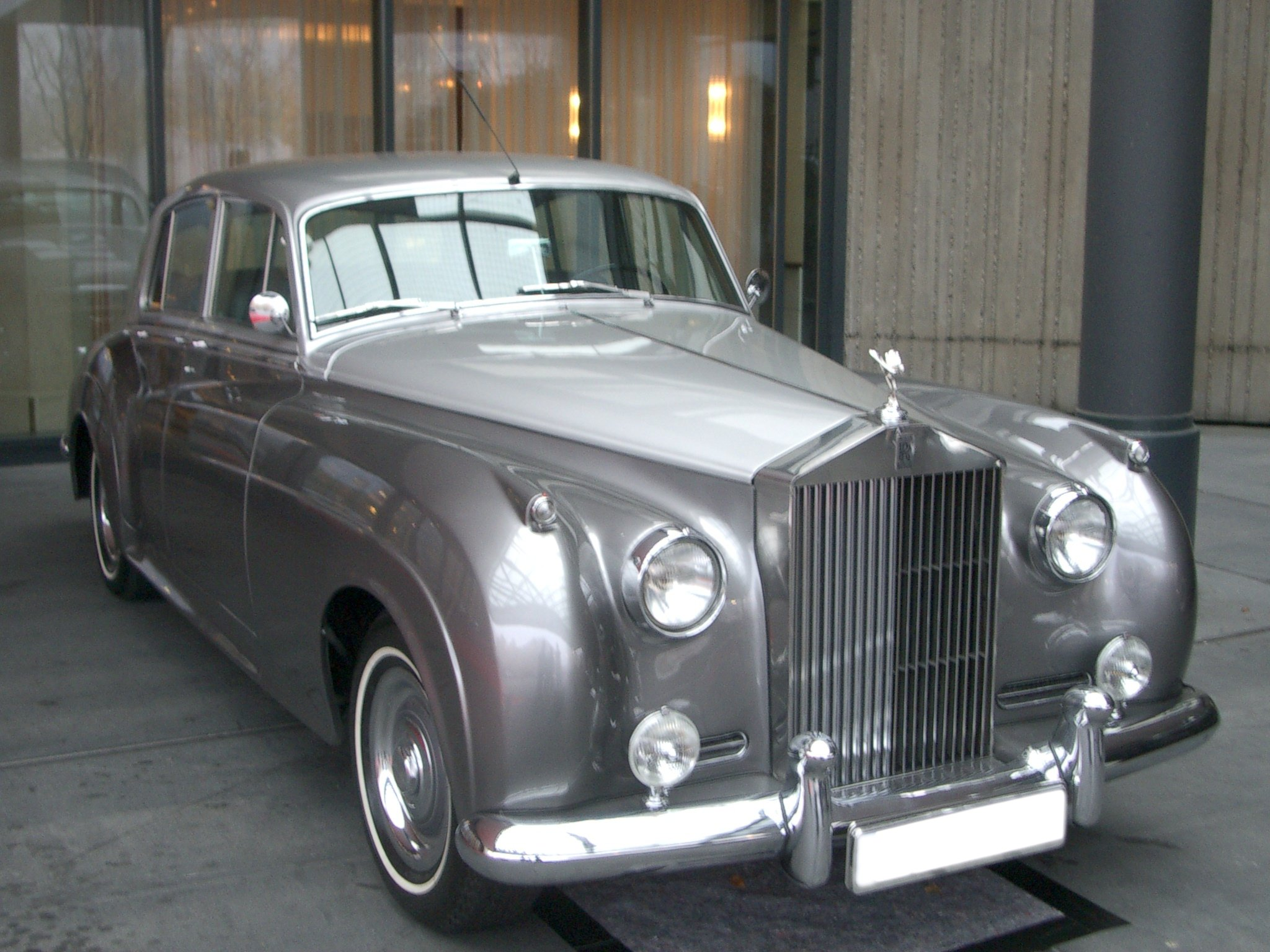
- Court: Court of Appeal of England and Wales
- Citation: [1971] 2 QB 711

Court membership
- Judges sitting: Lord Denning MR, Salmon LJ and Megaw LJ

Keywords
- Agency, apparent authority

Panorama Developments (Guildford) Ltd v Fidelis Furnishing Fabrics Ltd [1971] 2 QB 711 is a UK company law case, concerning the enforceability of obligations against a company.

== Facts ==
Fidelis’ company secretary, Mr Bayne, hired cars from Panorama Development's business, Belgravia Executive Car Rental. Bayne used the Fidelis' paper and represented that he wished to hire a number of Rolls-Royce's and Jaguars for the business while his managing director was away. He was lying and he used them himself. Bayne was prosecuted and imprisoned, but Belgravia had outstanding £570 12s 6d for the hired cars. Fidelis claimed that it was not bound to the hire contracts, because Bayne never had the authority to enter them.

== Judgment ==
Lord Denning MR held that Fidelis was nevertheless bound on the contract to Panorama. Mr Bayne, as company secretary had implied actual authority by virtue of his position as Company Secretary to enter into such agreements. Times had changed since 1887 when Barnett v South London Tramways Co held that company secretaries could not be assumed to have authority for anything. Secretaries are ‘certainly entitled to sign contracts connected with the administrative side of a company’s affairs, such as employing staff and ordering cars, and so forth.’ His judgment went as follows.

Mr. Hames, who appears for the Fidelis company, takes two points. His first point is that the contracts for hire were made with Mr. Bayne personally and not with the company: and so the company are not liable on them. He points out, quite rightly, that, on the face of each of these hiring agreements, the hirer is specifically stated to be "R. L. Bayne." He says that they were regular documents, duly executed, which were intended to embody the agreement that was made: and Belgravia cannot gainsay them. I was much impressed by that argument. It appears that in these "self-drive hire" transactions, Belgravia, for insurance purposes, always want the driver to be named as the hirer. So they deliberately inserted Mr. Bayne's name as the hirer. Can they now go back on their own documents? Belgravia have to prove that the Fidelis company was in fact the party which hired the cars. For this, they have to go outside their own regular hiring agreements. Can they do this? I think they can. I regard these hiring agreements as part and parcel of a contract contained in correspondence: so much so that you must not look at the hire agreement alone, but at all that took place. "In order fairly to estimate what was arranged and agreed, ... you must look at the whole of that which took place and passed between them": see Hussey v Horne-Payne (1879) 4 App Cas 311, per Earl Cairns LC at p 316.

Applying those considerations, it is clear that these cars were hired as a result of letters which described Fidelis Furnishing Fabrics Ltd. as the contracting party. The cars were booked by letters written on the paper of the Fidelis company and signed by Mr. R. L. Bayne, with the words underneath "Company Secretary." References were given as to the credit and standing of the Fidelis company. In these circumstances, the hiring agreements were mere machinery for carrying the correspondence into effect. One of them was overstamped with the signature: "Fidelis Furnishing Fabrics Ltd. - R. L. Bayne, Company Secretary." Clearly that agreement was with the company. It would be absurd to draw a distinction between that agreement and the others. The contract for each of them was with the company and not with Mr. Bayne.

Mr. Hames' second point is this: he says that the company is not bound by the letters which were signed by Mr. Bayne as "Company Secretary." He says that, on the authorities, a company secretary fulfils a very humble role: and that he has no authority to make any contracts or representations on behalf of the company. He refers to Barnett, Hoares & Co v South London Tramways Co (1887) 18 QBD 815 where Lord Esher M.R. said at p. 817:

"A secretary is a mere servant; his position is that he is to do what he is told, and no person can assume that he has any authority to represent anything at all; ..."

Those words were approved by Lord Macnaghten in George Whitechurch Ltd v Cavanagh [1902] AC 117, 124. They are supported by the decision in Ruben v Great Fingall Consolidated [1906] AC 439. They are referred to in some of the textbooks as authoritative.

But times have changed. A company secretary is a much more important person nowadays than he was in 1887. He is an officer of the company with extensive duties and responsibilities. This appears not only in the modern Companies Acts, but also by the role which he plays in the day-to-day business of companies. He is no longer a mere clerk. He regularly makes representations on behalf of the company and enters into contracts on its behalf which come within the day-to-day running of the company's business. So much so that he may be regarded as held out as having authority to do such things on behalf of the company. He is certainly entitled to sign contracts connected with the administrative side of a company's affairs, such as employing staff, and ordering cars, and so forth. All such matters now come within the ostensible authority of a company's secretary.

Accordingly I agree with the judge that Mr. R. L. Bayne, as company secretary, had ostensible authority to enter into contracts for the hire of these cars and, therefore, the company must pay for them. Mr. Bayne was a fraud. But it was the company which put him in the position in which he, as company secretary, was able to commit the frauds. So the defendants are liable. I would dismiss the appeal, accordingly.

Salmon LJ said the secretary ‘is the chief administrative officer of the company’ so he has ostensible authority with administrative matters. Nothing is more natural than ‘ordering cars so that its servants may go and meet foreign customers at airports, nothing to my mind, is more natural than that the company should hire those cars through its secretary.’ It might not be so with matters of commercial management of the company, for example, a contract for the sale or purchase of goods in which the company deals’ but that was not the case here.

Megaw LJ concurred.

== See also ==
- Agency in English law
- Capacity in English law
- UK company law
