= Hotline Communications =

Software company known for Hotline Connect

Hotline Communications Limited
- The logo for Hotline Communications, once dubbed "the best kept secret" on the internet by the L.A. Times
- Founded: 1997

Hotline Communications Limited (HCL) was a software company founded in 1997, based in Toronto, Canada, with employees also in the United States and Australia. Hotline Communications' main activity was the publishing and distribution of a multi-purpose client/server communication software product named Hotline Connect, informally called, simply, Hotline. Initially, Hotline Communications sought a wide audience for its products, and organizations as diverse as Avid Technology, Apple Computer Australia, and public high schools used Hotline. At its peak, Hotline received millions of dollars in venture capital funding, grew to employ more than fifty people, served millions of users, and won accolades at trade shows and in newspapers and computer magazines around the world.

Hotline eventually attracted more of an "underground" community, which saw it as an easier to use successor to the Internet Relay Chat (IRC) community. In 2001 Hotline Communications lost the bulk of its VC funding, and went out of business later that year. All of its assets were acquired in 2002 by Hotsprings, Inc., a new company formed by some ex-employees and shareholders. Hotsprings Inc. has since also abandoned development of the Hotline Connect software suite; the last iteration of Hotline Connect was released in December 2003.

Since 2008 some Hotliners have been slowly purchasing the defunct URLs so that they now have the main server, tracker, and BigRedH.com. This has allowed a revival of sorts while many open source clients have popped up over the last few years. Many active projects now have led to a revival of sorts seeing over 30 servers on the main tracker (HLTracker.com).

All new and existing clients have been preserved on the new wiki site after moving from an advertisement-based wiki host to hlwiki.com. The community has continued to grow, and new servers are added regularly with updated clients that support modern computers, while older clients remain available for compatibility with older systems

== History ==
Hotline was designed in 1996 and known as "hotwire" by Australian programmer Adam Hinkley (known online by his username, "Hinks"), then 17 years old, as a classic Mac OS application. The source code for the Hotline applications was based on a class library, "AppWarrior" (AW), which Hinkley wrote. AppWarrior would later become litigious, as Hinkley wrote parts of it while he was employed by an Australian company, Redrock Holdings. Six other fans of Hotline, David Murphy, Alex King, Phil Hilton, Jason Roks, David Bordin, and Terrance Gregory, joined Adam Hinkley's efforts to promote and market the Hotline programs, working day and night and using the company's own products to stay in touch from across the US, Canada, and Australia. Eventually, Canadian Jason Roks approached Adam Hinkley and encouraged him to move to Toronto, where Hotline Communications, Ltd. was incorporated. In 1997, Hotline won a "Best of the Show" award from one of the award ceremonies concurrent with the Boston MacWorld Expo. It received accolades in computer magazines and the mainstream press from Macworld Sweden (which awarded it a "Golden Mouse Award") to the Los Angeles Times, which called it one of the "best kept secrets on the internet", as well as a short article in Wired Magazine's September 1997 issue. At the time, the company's main objective was to release a stable Windows-compatible version to reach a wider audience.

However, a few months after Hinkley moved to Canada, he and his colleagues at Hotline Communications got into a major disagreement and Hinkley left the firm, encrypting source files for Hotline on Hotline Communication's computers, thus crippling the company. Lawsuits against Hinkley were filed by both Hotline Communications and Redrock, and Hinkley lost copyright of his "AppWarrior" library as well as rights over the "Hotline" software. The legal battle and Hinkley's case drew some media attention, especially on the Internet.

In the late 1990s, when Hotline's popularity was at its peak, thousands of Hotline servers were available, catering to a wide variety of user interests, including pornography, MP3s, and pirated software; it was these underground purposes that drew the majority of media attention. To access these files most Hotline servers required a login and password. The password was often obtainable by visiting a website provided by the server admin and clicking on a banner advertisement. Server admins would earn money per click and in return offer pirated software, music, movies and pornography to users.

At the end of the 1990s, by then outdated Hotline software started to gradually fade, as peer-to-peer systems like Gnutella and Kazaa became increasingly popular. Many early Hotline users felt sympathy for Hinkley and viewed Hotline Communications with a bad eye and the Hotline Connect suite did not sell well. In September 2001, Hotline Communications announced development of version 2.0 of the Hotline suite had been stopped, beta versions of which had not been well received by the community, and laid off most of its employees. In mid-October of the same year, the company announced the re-hire of their engineering team "in anticipation of the release of Hotline 2.0" on their website (offline as of May 2006). However, no stable build of Hotline 2.0 was ever released.

As of June 2026, hltracker.com and tracked.stickytack.com continue to provide tracker services for Hotline clients.
