= Fidelis Wainaina =

- Born: 1962; Kenya
- Died: March 5, 2008 (aged 46); Kenya
- Other names: Nyar Okuyo
- Occupation(s): Educator, development activist, farmer
- Known for: Founder of MICH, rural development, women's empowerment

Fidelis Wainaina (1962 – 5 March 2008) was the founder of Maseno Interchristian Child Self Help Group (MICH), an organization that strives for self-sustainability through agriculture, for the people of rural western Kenya. She won the Yara Prize in 2006 alongside Celina Cossa of Mozambique.

A former school teacher, Wainaina abandoned her teaching career after growing frustrated with a curriculum that prepared students more for exams than for the realities of life outside the classroom. She worked to eradicate poverty and hunger by assisting impoverished families farm their land sustainably. Popularly known by the Luo people of western Kenya as Nyar Okuyo (daughter of the Kikuyu), Wainaina was a champion of "gender revolution" in advocacy for women empowerment. Her focus groups in development were mainly street children and widows, especially those ravaged by the HIV/AIDS pandemic.

She died on 5 March 2008 at the age of 46, after being diagnosed with cancer.
