= Fidel (given name) =

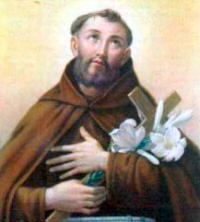
San Fidel de Sigmaringa

Fidel is a given name from the Latin "Fidelis" meaning "faithful." The feminine derivative is Fidelia. Notable people with the name include:

- Fidel Dávila Arrondo (1878–1962), Spanish Army officer
- Fidel Castaño, Colombian drug lord and paramilitary
- Fidel Castro (1926–2016), Cuban socialist revolutionary and politician
- Fidel Edwards (born 1982) West-Indian cricketer
- Fidel Negrete (1932–2016), Mexican long-distance runner
- Fidel Nemenzo, Filipino mathematician, professor, and current chancellor of the University of the Philippines Diliman
- Fidel V. Ramos (1928–2022), Filipino military general, politician, and former president of the Philippines
- Fidel Sánchez Hernández (1917–2003), president of El Salvador from 1967 to 1972
- Fidel Alonso de Santocildes (1844-1895), Spanish general of the Cuban War of Independence
- Fidel Solórzano (born 1962), Ecuadorian decathlete
- Fidel Velázquez Sánchez (1900–1997), Mexican union leader
- Pen name of Guillermo Prieto (1818–97), Mexican writer
- Fidel Chaves de la Torre (born 1989), Spanish footballer better known as just Fidel

== See also ==
- Fidelis (name), Latin equivalent
