= List of state leaders in the 4th century =

This is a list of state leaders in the 4th century (301–400) AD.

== Africa ==
=== Africa: East ===
- Kingdom of Aksum (complete list) –

- Aphilas, King (f. early 4th century)
- Wazeba, King (f. early 4th century)
- Ousanas, King (c.320)
- Ezana, King (c.333–c.356)
- MHDYS, King (c.350)
- Ouazebas, King (f. late 4th century)
- Eon, King (c.400)

== Americas ==
=== Americas: Mesoamerica ===
Mexico

- Teotihuacan –

- Spearthrower Owl, Emperor (374–439)

Maya civilization

- Tikal (complete list) –

- Sihyaj Chan K'awiil I, Ajaw (c.307)
- Unen Bahlam, Ajaw (c.317)
- K'inich Muwaan Jol, Ajaw (?–359)
- Chak Tok Ich'aak I, Ajaw (c.360–378)
- Yax Nuun Ahiin I, Ajaw (c.379–404)

== Asia ==
=== Asia: Central ===
Monɡolia

- Rouran Khaganate (complete list) –

- Yujiulü Mugulü, Tribal Chief (4th century)
- Yujiulü Cheluhui, Tribal Chief (4th century)
- Yujiulü Tunugui, Tribal Chief (4th century)
- Yujiulü Bati, Tribal Chief (4th century)
- Yujiulü Disuyuan, Tribal Chief (4th century)
- Yujiulü Pihouba, Tribal Chief (4th century)
- Yujiulü Wenheti, Tribal Chief (4th century)
- Yujiulü Heduohan, Tribal Chief (?-402)

=== Asia: East ===
China

- Western Jin, China (complete list) –

- Hui, Emperor (290–307)
- Sima Lun, Emperor (301)
- Huai, Emperor (307–311)
- Min, Emperor (313–316)

- Eastern Jin, China (complete list) –

- Yuan, Emperor (317–323)
- Ming, Emperor (323–325)
- Cheng, Emperor (325–342)
- Kang, Emperor (342–344)
- Mu, Emperor (344–361)
- Ai, Emperor (361–365)
- Fei, Emperor (365–372)
- Jianwen, Emperor (372)
- Xiaowu, Emperor (372–396)
- An, Emperor (396–419)

- Later Liang –

- Lü Guang, Emperor (386–400)
- Lü Shao, Emperor (400)
- Lü Zuan, Emperor (400–401)
- Lü Long, Emperor (401–403)

- Later Qin –

- Yao Chang, Emperor (384–393)
- Yao Xing, Emperor (394–416)

- Later Yan –

- Murong Chui, Emperor (384–396)
- Murong Bao, Emperor (396–398)
- Lan Han, Emperor (398)
- Murong Sheng, Emperor (398–401)

- Northern Liang –

- Duan Ye, Prince (397–401)

- Northern Wei –

- Emperor Daowu, Emperor (386–409)

- Southern Liang –

- Tufa Wugu, Prince (397–399)
- Tufa Lilugu, Prince (399–402)

- Western Liang –

- Li Gao, Prince (400–417)

- Western Qin –

- Qifu Gangui, Prince (388–400)

- Southern Yan –

- Murong De, Prince (398–405)

Japan

- Japan, Yayoi period (complete list) –

- Ōjin, Emperor (270–310)
- Nintoku, Emperor (313–399)
- Richū, Emperor (400–405)

Korea

- Baekje (complete list) –

- Bunseo, King (298–304)
- Biryu, King (304–344)
- Gye, King (344–346)
- Geunchogo, King (346–375)
- Geungusu, King (375–384)
- Chimnyu, King (384–385)
- Jinsa, King (385–392)
- Asin, King (392–405)

- Geumgwan Gaya (complete list) –

- Geojilmi, King (291–346)
- Isipum, King (346–407)

- Goguryeo (complete list) –

- Micheon, King (300–331)
- Gogug-won, King (331–371)
- Sosurim, King (371–384)
- Gogug-yang, King (384–391)
- Gwanggaeto, King (391–413)

- Silla (complete list) –

- Heulhae, King (310–356)
- Naemul, King (356–402)

=== Asia: Southeast ===
Cambodia

- Funan (complete list) –

- Zhāntán, King (c.357)

Indonesia

Indonesia: Java

- Salakanagara –

- Dewawarman VII, King (early 4th century)
- Dewawarman VIII, King (early 4th century–362)

- Tarumanagara (complete list) –

- Jayasingawarman, King (358–382)
- Dharmayawarman, King (382–395)
- Purnawarman, King (395–434)

Indonesia: Kalimantan (Borneo)

- Kutai Martadipura –

- Kudungga, King (mid 4th century)
- Asvavarman, King (late 4th century)
- Mulavarman, King (c.400)

Malaysia: Peninsular

- Kedah Sultanate (complete list) –

- Durbar Maharaja I, Maharaja (c.330–390)
- DiMaharaja Putra, Maharaja (c.390–440)

Vietnam

- Champa (complete list) –

- Fan Yi, King (c.284–336)
- Fan Wen, King (336–349)
- Fan Fo, King (349–380)
- Bhadravarman I, King (380–413)

=== Asia: South ===
Northeast India

- Kamarupa: Varman dynasty (complete list) –

- Pushyavarman, King (350–374)
- Samudravarman, King (374–398)
- Balavarman, King (398–422)

India

- Western Ganga dynasty (complete list) –

- Konganivarman Madhava, King (350–370)
- Madhava, King (370–390)
- Harivarman, King (390–410)

- Gupta Empire (complete list) –

- Ghatotkacha, King (c.280–319)
- Chandragupta I, Emperor (c.320–335)
- Samudragupta, Emperor (c.335–375)
- Ramagupta, Emperor (c.375–380)
- Chandragupta II, Emperor (c.380–413/15)

- Kadamba dynasty: Banavasi (complete list) –

- Mayurasharma, Maharaja (345–365)
- Kangavarma, Maharaja (365–390)
- Bhageerath, Maharaja (390–415)

- Kushan Empire (complete list) –

- Vasudeva II, Ruler/Emperor (c.275–310)
- Chhu, Ruler/Emperor (c.310?–325?)
- Shaka I, Ruler/Emperor (c.325–345)
- Kipunada, Ruler/Emperor (c.345–375)

- Western Satraps (complete list) –

- Visvasena, Satrap (293–304)
- Rudrasimha II, Satrap (304–348)
- Yasodaman II, Satrap (317–332)
- Rudradaman II, Satrap (332–348)
- Rudrasena III, Satrap (348–380)
- Simhasena, Satrap (380–384/5)
- Rudrasena IV, Satrap (382–388)
- Rudrasimha III, Satrap (388–395)

- Vakataka dynasty (complete list) –

- Pravarasena I, King (270–330)

Pravarapura–Nandivardhana branch

- Rudrasena I, King (330–355)
- Prithivishena I, King (355–380)
- Rudrasena II, King (380–385)
- Prabhavatigupta, Regent (385–405)
- Divakarasena, King (385–400)
- Damodarasena, King (400–440)

Vatsagulma branch

- Sarvasena, King (330–355)
- Vindhyasena, King (355–400)
- Pravarasena II, King (400–415)

Pakistan

- Kushano-Sasanian Kingdom (complete list) –

- Hormizd II, Kushanshah (300–303)
- Peroz II, Kushanshah (303–330)
- Varahran, Kushanshah (330–365)

Sri Lanka

- Anuradhapura Kingdom (complete list) –

- Mahasena, King (277–304)
- Sirimeghavanna, King (304–332)
- Jettha Tissa II, King (332–341)
- Buddhadasa, King (341–370)
- Upatissa I, King (370–412)

=== Asia: West ===
Persia

- Persia: Sasanian Empire (complete list) –

- Narseh, Shahanshah, King of Kings (293–302)
- Hormizd II, Shahanshah, King of Kings (302–309)
- Adur Narseh, Shahanshah, King of Kings (309)
- Shapur II, Shahanshah, King of Kings (309–379)
- Ardashir II, Shahanshah, King of Kings (379–383)
- Shapur III, Shahanshah, King of Kings (383–388)
- Bahram IV, Shahanshah, King of Kings (388–399)
- Yazdegerd I, Shahanshah, King of Kings (399–420)

== Europe ==
=== Europe: Balkans ===
- Roman Empire: East/ Byzantine Empire (complete list) –

- Diocletian

- Emperor in civil war (284–285)
- Sole Emperor (285–286)
- Eastern Emperor (286–305)

- Galerius

- Eastern Caesar (293–305)
- Eastern Emperor (305–311)

- Maximinus II

- Eastern Caesar (305–308)
- Eastern Emperor (310–312)

- Licinius

- Western Emperor (308–313)
- Eastern Emperor (313–324)

- Constantine I

- Western Caesar (306–312)
- Western Emperor (312–324)
- Sole Emperor (324–337)

- Constantius II

- Eastern Emperor (337–350)
- Sole Emperor (350–361)

- Julian

- Western Emperor (355–361)
- Sole Emperor (361–363)

- Jovian, Sole Emperor (363–364)
- Valens

- Eastern Emperor (364–378)

- Theodosius I

- Eastern Emperor (379–392)
- Emperor (392–395)

- Arcadius

- Junior Emperor (383–395)
- Eastern Emperor (395–408)

=== Europe: British Isles ===
Ireland

- Ireland (complete list) –

These kings are generally thought historical, but dates are uncertain and naming some High Kings may be anachronistic or inaccurate.
- Niall Noígíallach, High King (generally thought historical: 4th–5th century)
- Nath Í, High King (4th–5th century)

=== Europe: Central ===
- Alamannia, tribal kingdoms (complete list) –

- Chrocus, leader (fl.260–306)
- Mederic, petty king (early 4th century)
- Chnodomarius, petty king (pre-350–357)
- Gundomadus, petty king (fl.354–357)
- Agenaric, petty king (fl.357)
- Suomarius, petty king (fl.357–358)
- Hortarius, petty king (fl.357–359)
- Vestralpus, petty king (fl.359)
- Urius, petty king (fl.359)
- Ursicinus, petty king (fl.359)
- Macrianius, petty king (fl.359)
- Hariobaudes, petty king (fl.359)
- Vadomarius, petty king (fl.359)
- Rando, petty king (fl.368)
- Vithicabius, petty king (360–368)
- Priarius, petty king (?–378)

- Vandals (complete list) –

- Wisimar, King (?–335)
- Godigisel, King (359–407)

=== Europe: East ===
- Bosporan Kingdom (complete list) –

- Theothorses, client king under Rome (279–309)
- Rhadamsades, client king under Rome (309–322)
- Rhescuporis VI, client king under Rome (314–341)

=== Europe: Southcentral ===
- Roman Empire: West (complete list) –

- Maximian

- Caesar (285–286)
- Western Emperor (286–305)

- Constantius Chlorus

- Western Caesar (293–305)
- Western Emperor (305–306)

- Severus

- Western Caesar (305–306)
- Western Emperor, in civil war (306–307)

- Maxentius, Western Emperor, in civil war (306–312)
- Licinius

- Western Emperor (308–313)
- Eastern Emperor (313–324)

- Constantine I

- Western Caesar (306–312)
- Western Emperor (312–324)
- Sole Emperor (324–337)

- Crispus, Caesar (317–326)
- Constantine II, Emperor of Gaul, Britannia, and Hispania (337–340)
- Constans I

- Emperor of Italy and Africa (337–340)
- Western Emperor (340–350)

- Constantius II

- Eastern Emperor (337–350)
- Emperor (350–361)

- Magnentius, usurper Emperor (350–353)
- Decentius, usurper Caesar (350–353)
- Vetranio, Co-Emperor (350)
- Julian

- Western Emperor (355–361)
- Sole Emperor (361–363)

- Jovian, Sole Emperor (363–364)
- Valentinian I, Western Emperor (364–375)
- Gratian

- junior Western Emperor (367–375)
- Western Emperor (375–383)

- Valentinian II

- junior Western Emperor (375–383)
- Western Emperor (383–392)

- Magnus Maximus, usurper Emperor (383–388)
- Eugenius, Western Emperor (392–394)
- Theodosius I

- Eastern Emperor (379–392)
- Sole Emperor (392–395)

- Honorius, Western Emperor (395–423)
- Stilicho, power behind the throne (395–408)

=== Eurasia: Caucasus ===
- Armenia: Arsacid dynasty (complete list) –

- Tiridates III, client King under Rome (287–330)
- Khosrov III, client King under Rome (330–339)
- Tiran VII, client King under Rome (339–c.350)
- Arsaces II (Arshak II), client King under Rome (c.350–368)
- Interregnum under Sasania
- Pap, client King under Rome (370–374)
- Varazdat, client King under Rome (374–378)
- Arsaces III (Arshak III), client King under Rome (378–387)
- Vologases III, client King under Rome, Co-Ruler (378–386)
- Khosrov IV, client King under Rome (387–389)
- Vramshapuh, client King under Rome (389–417)

- Kingdom of Iberia (Kartli) (complete list) –

- Mirian III, King (284–361)
- Sauromaces II, King (361–363)
- Aspacures II, King (363–365)
- Mihrdat III, King (365–380)
- Aspacures III, King (380–394)
- Trdat, King (394–406)

== See also ==
- List of political entities in the 4th century
