= Alamannia =

Former territory inhabited by the Germanic Alemanni peoples

Kingdom of Alamannia Regnum Alamanniae (Latin)
- 213–911
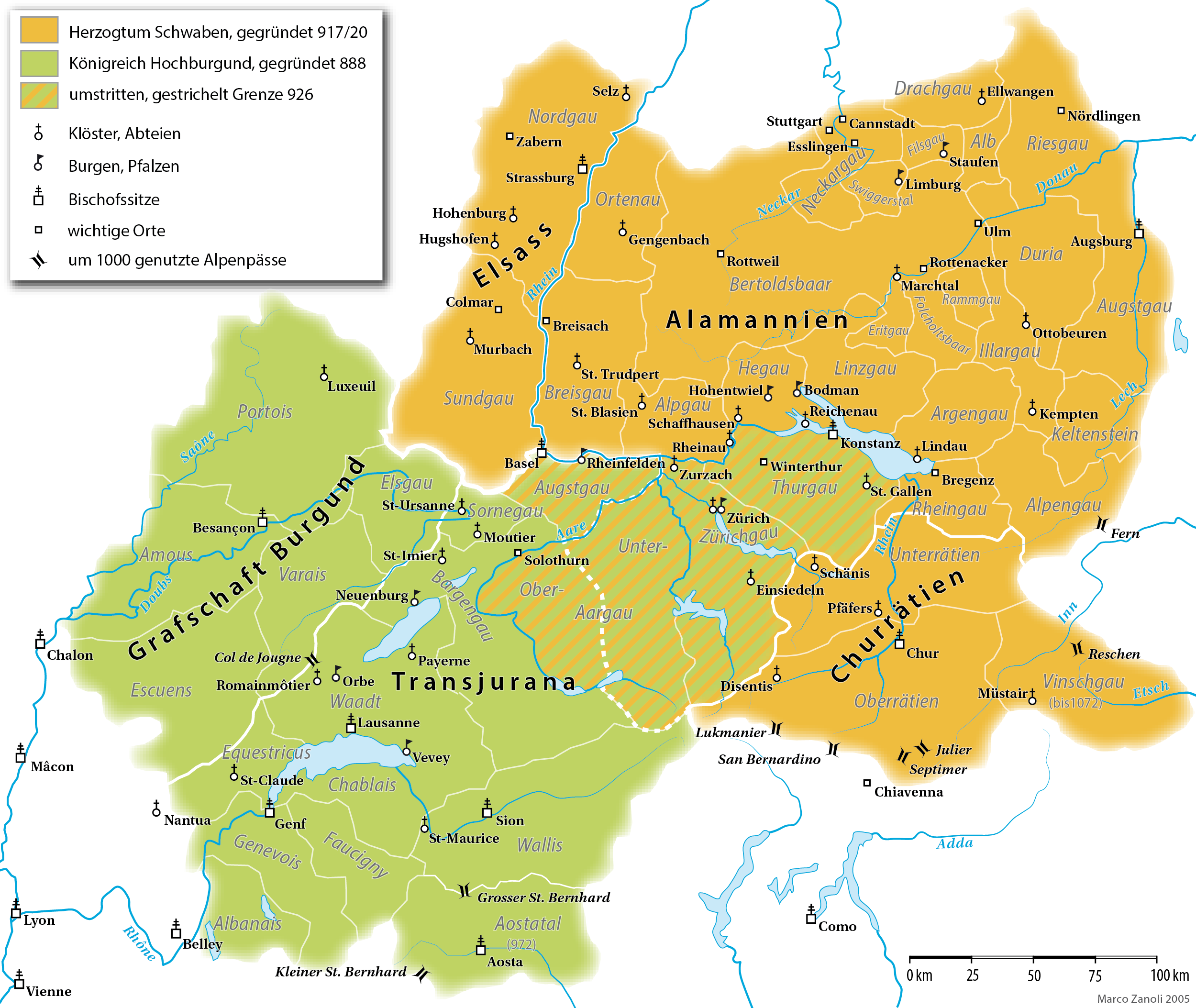
- Alemannia (orange) and Upper Burgundy (green) in the 10th century
- Status: Part of the Frankish Empire (496, 539–843), the Ostrogothic Kingdom (496–539), and East Francia (843–911)
- Government: Monarchy
- Historical era: Migration Period, Early Middle Ages
  - Alemanni invade Germania superior: 213
  - Under Frankish suzerainty: 496
  - Under direct Carolingian rule: 746
  - Stem duchy of East Francia: 843
  - Election of Conrad I of Germany, formation of the Holy Roman Empire: 911
Preceded by	Succeeded by
Germania superior	Duchy of Swabia

Alamannia, or Alemania, was the kingdom established and inhabited by the Alemanni, a Germanic tribal confederation that had broken through the Roman limes in 213.

The Alemanni expanded from the Main River basin during the 3rd century and raided Roman provinces and settled on the left bank of the Rhine River from the 4th century.

Ruled by independent tribal kings during the 4th and the 5th centuries, Alamannia lost its independence in the late 5th century and became a duchy of the Frankish Empire in the 6th century. As the Holy Roman Empire started to form under King Conrad I of East Francia (reigning 911 to 918), the territory of Alamannia became the Duchy of Swabia in 915. Scribes often used the term Suebia interchangeably with Alamannia in the 10th to the 12th centuries.

The territory of Alamannia as it existed from the 7th to 9th centuries centred on Lake Constance and included the High Rhine, the Black Forest and the Alsace on either side of the Upper Rhine, the upper Danube River basin as far as the confluence with the Lech River, with an unclear boundary towards Burgundy to the south-west in the Aare River basin (the Aargau). Raetia Curiensis, although not part of Alemannia, was ruled by Alemannic counts, and became part of the Duchy of Swabia since it was established by Burchard I (Duke of Alemannia from 909 to 911).

The territory corresponds to what is still the area of Alemannic German in the modern period, French Alsace, German Baden and Swabia, German-speaking Switzerland and the Austrian Vorarlberg.

In the area of present-day Switzerland, the Alemannic territory expanded during the High Middle Ages, with the Walser migration into the Alps, with the Zähringer and later the influence of Bern towards Upper Burgundy, and into Grisons as lower Raetia came under the rule of the Werdenberg counts.

== Geography ==
The Alamanni were pushed south from their original area of settlement in the Main basin and in the 5th and 6th century settled new territory on either side of the Rhine. Alemannia, under Frankish rule (later the Duchy of Swabia) within the Holy Roman Empire, covered a territory that was more or less undisputed during the 7th to 13th centuries, organised into counties or pagi.

In Swabia: Hegowe (Hegau), between Lake Constance, the upper Danube and the Swabian Jura. Perahtoltaspara (Berchtoldsbaar) in the upper Neckar basin, left of the upper Danube as far as Ulm, including the source of the Danube. Nekargowe (named for the Neckar, capital Canstatt). Swiggerstal (the modern Ermstal), Filiwigawe (Filsgau, named for the Fils), Trachgowe (Drachgau, near Schwäbisch Gmünd) and Alba (Albuch) between the Neckar and the Danube. Duria (Duriagau) between Ulm and Augsburg.

Albegowe (Allgäu), Keltinstein (between Geltnach and Wertach) and Augestigowe (capital Augsburg) along the Lech forming the border to Bavaria. Rezia (Ries, ultimately from the name of the Roman province of Raetia) in the Northeastern corner, left of the Danube (capital Nördlingen). Linzgowe (Linzgau) and Argungowe (named for Argen River) north of Lake Constance. Eritgau, Folcholtespara (Folcholtsbaar), Rammegowe (Rammachgau) and Illargowe (named for the Iller, capital Memmingen) on the right side of the Danube.

In Baden: Brisigowe (Breisgau) along the Upper Rhine opposite Sundgau, and Mortunova, the later Ortenau, along the Upper Rhine opposite Nordgau. Alpegowe (Albgau), centered on St. Blaise Abbey, Black Forest.

In modern France (the Alsace): Suntgowe (Sundgau) and Nordgowe (Nordgau).

In modern Switzerland: Augestigowe (the territory surrounding Augst) and Turgowe (modern Thurgau, named for the Thur; Zürichgau was detached from Thurgau in the 8th century).

The territory between Alamannia and Upper Burgundy was known as Argowe (modern Aargau, named for the Aare). The pertinence of this territory to either Alamannia or Upper Burgundy was disputed.

The county of Raetia Curiensis was absorbed into Alamannia in the early 10th century. It comprised the Ringowe (Rheingau, named for the Rhine) and Retia proper.

== History ==
=== Tribal kingdoms ===
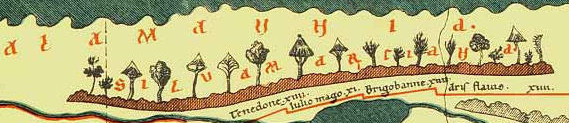
Alamannia is shown beyond Silva Marciana (the Black Forest) in the Tabula Peutingeriana. Suevia is indicated separately, further downstream of the Rhine, beyond Silva Vosagus, between Argentorate (Strasbourg) and Moguntiacum (Mainz).

Originally a loose confederation of unrelated tribes, the Alemanni underwent coalescence or ethnogenesis during the 3rd century, and were ruled by kings throughout the 4th and 5th centuries until 496, when they were defeated by Clovis I of the Franks at the Battle of Tolbiac.

The Alemanni during the Roman Empire period were divided into a number of cantons or goviae, each presided by a tribal king. But there appears to have been the custom of the individual kings uniting under the leadership of a single king in military expeditions.

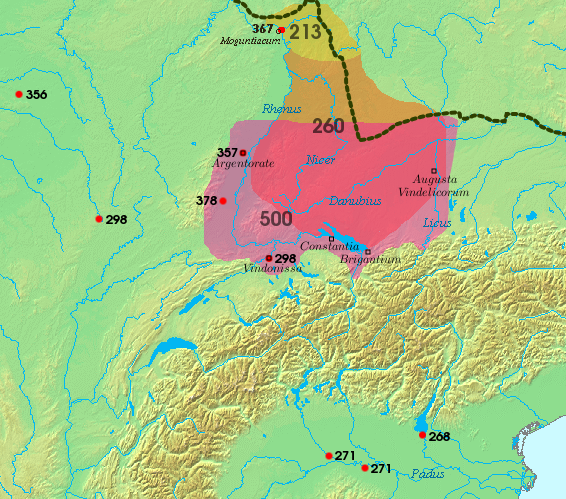
Area settled by the Alamanni during the 3rd to 6th centuries; notable raids or battles of the 3rd to 4th centuries are also indicated.

Some kings of the Alemanni of the 4th and 5th centuries are known by name, the first being Chrocus (died 306), a military leader who organized raids across the limes during the 3rd century. Chnodomarius (fl. 350) supported Constantius II in the rebellion of Magnentius. Chnodomarius was the leader of the Alemannic army in the battle of Strasbourg in 357.

Macrian, Hariobaudes, Urius, Ursicinus, Vadomarius, and Vestralpus were Alemannic kings who in 359 made treaties with Julian the Apostate. Macrian was deposed in an expedition ordered by Valentinian I in 370. Macrian appears to have been involved in building a large alliance of Alemannic tribes against Rome, which earned him the title of turbarum rex artifex ("king and crafter of unrest").

The Romans installed Fraomar as a successor of Marcian, but the Bucinobantes would not accept him and he was expelled and Macrian restored and Valentinian made the Bucinobantes his foederati in the war against the Franks. Macrian was killed on campaign against the Franks, in an ambush laid by the Frankish king Mallobaudes.

Gibuld (fl. 470) is the last known king of the Alemanni. His raid on Passau is mentioned in the vita of Saint Lupus. The name of Gibuld's successor who was defeated at Tolbiac is not known.

=== Merovingian duchy ===
After their defeat in 496, the Alemanni bucked the Frankish yoke and put themselves under the protection of Theodoric the Great of the Ostrogoths but after his death they were again subjugated by the Franks under Theudebert I in 536. Thereafter, Alamannia was a nominal dukedom within Francia.

Though ruled by their own dukes, it is not likely that they were very often united under one duke in the 6th and 7th centuries. The Alemanni most frequently appear as auxiliaries in expeditions to Italy. The Duchy of Alsace was Alemannic, but it was ruled by a line of Frankish dukes and the region around the upper Danube and Neckar rivers was ruled by the Ahalolfing family and not by the ducal house which ruled central Alamannia around Lake Constance. Rhaetia too, though Alamannic, was ruled by the Victorids coterminously with the Diocese of Chur.

Alamannia was Christianised during the 7th century, although not as thoroughly as either Francia to its west or Bavaria to its east. The first Alamannic law code, Pactus Alamannorum, dates to this period. The Roman dioceses of Strasbourg and Basel covered Alsace and that of Chur, as mentioned, Rhaetia. Alamannia itself had a diocese only in the east, at Augsburg (early 7th century). There were two Roman bishoprics, Windisch and Octodurum, which were moved early to other sites (Avenches and Sitten respectively).

Western Alamannia did eventually (7th century) receive a diocese (Constance) through the cooperation of the bishops of Chur and the Merovingian monarchs. The foundation of Constance is obscure, though it was the largest diocese in Germany throughout the Merovingian and early Carolingian era. The dioceses of Alamannia, including Chur, which had been a suffragan of the Archdiocese of Milan, were placed under the jurisdiction of the Archdiocese of Mainz by the Carolingians.

After the death of Dagobert I in 638, Alamannia, like Bavaria, Aquitaine, and Brittany, broke its ties with its Frankish sovereigns and struggled for independence. This was largely successful until the early 8th century, when a series of campaigns waged by the Arnulfing mayors of the palace reduced Alamannia to a province of Francia once again. It was, however, during this period of de facto independence that the Alamanni began to be ruled by one duke, though Alsace and Rhaetia remained outside of the scope of Alamannia.

Between 709 and 712, Pepin of Heristal fought against Lantfrid, who appears as dux of the Alamanni, and who committed to writing the second Alamannic law code, the Lex Alamannorum. In 743, Pepin the Short and Carloman waged a campaign to reduce Alamannia and in 746 Carloman began a final thrust to subdue the Alamannic nobility. Several thousand Alamanni noblemen were summarily arrested, tried, and executed for treason at a Council at Cannstatt.

=== Carolingian rule ===
During the reign of Louis the Pious, there were tendencies to renewed independence in Alamannia, and the 830s were marked by bloody feuds between the Alamannic and Rhaetian nobility vying for dominion over the area. Following the Treaty of Verdun of 843, Alamannia became a province of East Francia, the kingdom of Louis the German, the precursor of the Kingdom of Germany. It was called a regnum in contemporary sources, though this does not necessarily mean that it was a kingdom or subkingdom. At times, however, it was.

It was granted to Charles the Bald in 829, though it is not certain whether he was recognised as duke or king. It was certainly a kingdom, including Alsace and Rhaetia, when it was granted to Charles the Fat in the division of East Francia in 876. Under Charles, Alamannia became the centre of the Empire, but after his deposition, it found itself out of favour. Though ethnically singular, it was still plagued by Rhaetian-Alamannic feuds and fighting over the control of the Alamannic church.

Alamannia in the late 9th century, like Bavaria, Saxony, and Franconia, sought to unite itself under one duke, but it had considerably less success than either Saxony or Bavaria. Alamannia was one of the jüngeres Stammesherzogtum, one of the "younger" stem duchies, or tribal duchies, which formed the basis of the political organisation of East Francia after the collapse of the Carolingian dynasty in the late 9th and early 10th centuries.

In the 10th century, no noble house of Alamannia succeeded in founding a ducal dynasty, as the Ottonians did in Saxony or the Liutpolding in Bavaria, though the Hunfridings came closest.

The duchy encompassed the area surrounding Lake Constance, the Black Forest, and the left and right banks of the Rhine, including Alsace and parts of the Swiss Plateau, bordering on Upper Burgundy. The boundary with Burgundy, fixed in 843, ran along the lower Aare, turning towards the south at the Rhine, passing west of Lucerne and across the Alps along the upper Rhône to the Saint Gotthard Pass. In the north, the boundary ran from the Murg (some 30 km south of Karlsruhe) to Heilbronn and the Nördlinger Ries. The eastern boundary was at the Lech. Argovia was disputed territory between the dukes of Alamannia and Burgundy.

Burchard II, son of the late Burchard I and count in Raetia Curiensis, took the title of duke of Swabia, Duke acknowledged by the newly elected king Henry the Fowler in 919. The duchy of Swabia was ruled by the Hohenstaufen during 1079–1268 and was disestablished with the execution of Conradin and its territory was politically fragmented during the succeeding interregnum period.

== Legacy ==
Alemannic German persists as a separate family of dialects within High German. The distribution of the Low Alemannic and High Alemannic subgroups largely correspond to the extent of historical Alemannia, while the Highest Alemannic dialects spread beyond its limits during the High Middle Ages. The Brünig-Napf-Reuss line is a cultural boundary within High Alemannic which marks the division of Alemannia proper and the Argovia marches between Alemannia and Burgundy.

The names for Germany in modern Arabic (ألمانيا), Catalan (Alemanya), Welsh (Yr Almaen), Cornish (Almayn), French (Allemagne), Persian (ألمان), Galician-Portuguese (Alemanha), Spanish (Alemania), and Turkish (Almanya) all derive from Alamannia. A similar correspondence exists for "German", both as the language and the adjectival form of "Germany".

== List of rulers of Alamannia ==
=== Independent kings ===
The following are the known names of early Alemannic kings. They did not necessarily rule all of Alamannia, but were more likely petty kings ruling over smaller tribes or cantons, e.g. Macrian (fl. 370), king of the Alamannic tribe of the Bucinobantes.

- Chrocus 306
- Mederic (father of Agenarich, brother Chnodomarius)
- Chnodomarius 350, 357
- Agenaric (Serapio) 357
- Suomarius 357, 358
- Hortarius 357, 359
- Gundomadus 354 (co-regent of Vadomarius)
- Alemannic kings mentioned by Ammianus Marcellinus: Vestralpus, Urius, Ursicinus, Macrianius, Hariobaudes, Vadomarius. Julian the Apostate made peace treaties with these kings in 359.
- Rando 368
- Vithicabius 360–368
- Priarius ?–378
- Hunno 385
- Gibuld (Gebavult) c. 470

=== Dukes under Frankish suzerainty ===
- Butilin 539–554
- Leuthari I, before 552–554
- Haming 539–554
- four dukes in the Diocese of Avenches 548–573:
  - Lantachar d. 548
  - Magnachar 555–565
  - Vaefar 565–573
  - Theodefrid 573
- Leutfred 570–587, deposed by Childebert II
- Uncilin 587–607
- Gunzo 613
- Chrodobert 630
- Gundoin, Duke of Alsace, fl. 630s
- Leuthari II 642
- Boniface, Duke of Alsace, until c. 662
- Adalrich, Duke of Alsace, c. 662–after 683
- Adalbert, Duke of Alsace, after 683–723
- Gotfrid until 709
- Willehari 709–712 (in Ortenau)
- Lantfrid 709–730
- Theudebald 709–744
- Liutfrid, Duke of Alsace, 723–after 742

=== Carolingians ===
The Alemanni were under direct Carolingian rule during 746 (Council of Cannstatt) to 892. Intermittently, junior members of the Carolingian dynasties were appointed regulus or subregulus of Alemannia while at other times, Alemannia was under the direct administration of the Carolingian kings (after 843 kings of East Francia).

- Childeric III (King of the Franks 743–751)
  - Carloman 744–747
  - Drogo 747–748
- Pepin the Short 748–768 (King of the Franks 751–768)
- Carloman I (King of the Franks 768–771)
- Charlemagne (King of the Franks 768–814)
  - Hnabi Ahalolfing, grandson of Gotfrid, is mentioned as an Alamannic duke during the reign of Charlemagne
- Louis the Pious (King of the Franks 814–840)
- Charles the Bald 829–840 (King of the Franks 840–843, King of West Francia 843–877)
- Louis the German 843–864 (King of Bavaria 817–843, King of East Francia 843–876)
- Charles the Fat 864–880 (King of West Francia 884–887)
  - Hugh, Duke of Alsace 867–885
- Louis the Younger 880–882 (King of Bavaria 880–882)
- Arnulf of Carinthia (King of East Francia 887–899)
  - Charles the Fat 882–888 (King of West Francia 884–887)
  - Bernard 888–892
- Louis the Child (King of East Francia 889–911)
  - Burchard I Hunfriding 909–911

From the later 8th century, Alemannic dynasties were able to establish themselves once again. Variously called counts, or margraves, or dukes, these native dynasties during the later years of Carolingian rule managed to establish themselves as de facto independent, establishing the "younger stem duchy" of Alemannia/Swabia by the early 10th century. The rivalry between the Hunfridings and Ahalolfings was decided in favour of Burchard II Hunfriding in the Battle of Winterthur of 919.

== See also ==
- List of Alamannic pagi
- Lex Alamannorum
- Annales Alamannici
- Early history of Switzerland
- Alemannic German
