= Hortarius =

4th century Alemannic king

Hortarius (German: Hortar) was an Alemannic king in the 4th century.

Hortarius is mentioned by the Roman historian Ammianus Marcellinus. After defeating the Roman army master Barbatio in 357, the Alemannic kings Hortarius, Suomarius, Urius, Ursicinus and Vestralpus united under the leadership of Chnodomarius and Agenaric and moved against the Roman commander Severus at the Battle of Strasbourg. After losing the battle, Hortarius was able to escape execution by proving materials to the Romans. In 358, emperor Julian made a peace treaty with Hortarius and he remained at peace with the Romans who were allowed to cross his lands.

Another Alemannic nobleman called Hortarius served together with Bitheridus, a chieftain of the Bucinobantes, as a troop leader in the Roman army under Valentinian I. He was soon accused however, by the dux Florentius, of conspiring with Macrian and other Allemanic leaders and was subsequently tortured and burnt alive.

== Sources ==
- Dieter Geuenich: Geschichte der Alemannen (= Kohlhammer-Urban-Taschenbücher. 575). 2., überarbeitete Auflage. Kohlhammer Verlag, Stuttgart 2005, ISBN 3-17-018227-7.
- Dieter Geuenich: Hortar. In: Reallexikon der Germanischen Altertumskunde (RGA). 2. Auflage. Band 15, Walter de Gruyter, Berlin / New York 2000, ISBN 3-11-016649-6, S. 131.
