= Suomarius =

Suomarius (German: Suomar) was an Alemannic petty king in the 4th century.

The Roman historian Ammianus Marcellinus reports that after a victorious battle against the Roman general Barbatio in 357, the Alemannic kings Suomarius, Hortarius, Urius, Ursicinus and Vestralpus united under the leadership of Chnodomarius and Agenaric and fought the Romans at the Battle of Strasbourg. After losing the battle, Suomarius asked the Roman commander Severus to spare his life and provide him with land, which Severus did in return for soldiers and supplies. In 358, the future emperor Julian concluded a peace treaty with Suomarius. This treaty was not renewed by Julian's successor Valentinian I.
