= Scudilo =

Alemannic warrior

Scudilo (Greek: Σκοδιλών) was an Alemannic warrior who served in the Roman army under emperor Constantius II.

== Life ==
If Scudilo is identical to the Skolidoas mentioned by Zosimus, he began serving in the Roman army as a tribune in 351. He probably served as tribunus scutariorum (chief of the bodyguards) of emperor Constantius II. In 351 Scudilo moved with an army from Milan to the Rhine with the intention of crossing the river at Augusta Raurica and attacking the Alemannic brothers Vadomarius and Gundomadus. However, the bridge was held by the Alemanni. Local guides showed the Romans a ford, but they still failed to cross the river. Despite his good reputation, Scudilo was suspected, together with Agilo and Latinus, of having warned the Alemannic king Vadomarius of an impending Roman attack. Nevertheless, the Alemanni negotiated a peace treaty with the Romans, allegedly because their priests had discouraged battle on the basis of bad omens.

Scudilo was later sent to Antioch to persuade Constantius Gallus into vising the court of Constantius II. Shortly thereafter, he died of a hemorrhage.
