= Latinus (Alemanni) =

4th century Germanic warrior serving Rome

Latinus was an Alemannic warrior.

From 351 to 354 he served as comes domesticorum in the Roman army under emperor Constantius II. In 354, Latinus, Agilo, and Scudilo were suspected of having warned the Alemannic king Vadomarius of an impending Roman military attack.
