= 496 =

Calendar year

496 in various calendars
- Gregorian calendar: 496; CDXCVI
- Ab urbe condita: 1249
- Assyrian calendar: 5246
- Balinese saka calendar: 417–418
- Bengali calendar: −98 – −97
- Berber calendar: 1446
- Buddhist calendar: 1040
- Burmese calendar: −142
- Byzantine calendar: 6004–6005
- Chinese calendar: 乙亥年 (Wood Pig); 3193 or 2986 — to — 丙子年 (Fire Rat); 3194 or 2987
- Coptic calendar: 212–213
- Discordian calendar: 1662
- Ethiopian calendar: 488–489
- Hebrew calendar: 4256–4257
- Hindu calendars
- Vikram Samvat: 552–553
- Shaka Samvat: 417–418
- Kali Yuga: 3596–3597
- Holocene calendar: 10496
- Iranian calendar: 126 BP – 125 BP
- Islamic calendar: 130 BH – 129 BH
- Javanese calendar: 382–383
- Julian calendar: 496; CDXCVI
- Korean calendar: 2829
- Minguo calendar: 1416 before ROC 民前1416年
- Nanakshahi calendar: −972
- Seleucid era: 807/808 AG
- Thai solar calendar: 1038–1039
- Tibetan calendar: ཤིང་མོ་ཕག་ལོ་ (female Wood-Boar); 622 or 241 or −531 — to — མེ་ཕོ་བྱི་བ་ལོ་ (male Fire-Rat); 623 or 242 or −530

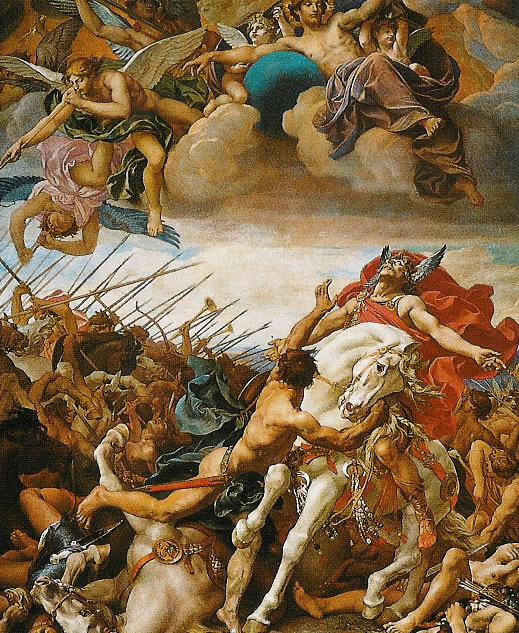
King Clovis I leading the Franks to victory, by Ary Scheffer (1881)

Battle of Tolbiac (496)

Year 496 (CDXCVI) was a leap year starting on Monday of the Julian calendar. In the Roman Empire, it was known as the Year of the Consulship of Paulus without colleague (or, less frequently, year 1249 Ab urbe condita). The denomination 496 for this year has been used since the early medieval period, when the Anno Domini calendar era became the prevalent method in Europe for naming years.

== Events ==
=== By place ===
==== Byzantine Empire ====
- Emperor Anastasius I has Euphemius, patriarch of Constantinople, deposed and excommunicated. He appoints Macedonius II as his successor. Euphemius is sent into exile.

==== Europe ====
- Battle of Tolbiac: King Clovis I defeats the Alamanni at Zülpich (Germany). Gibuld, last king of the Alamanni, is killed in battle and the territory is incorporated into the Frankish Kingdom.
- December 25 – Clovis I is baptized into the Catholic faith at Rheims, by Saint Remigius. The conversion strengthens the bonds between his Gallo-Roman subjects, led by their Catholic bishops.

==== Africa ====
- Thrasamund succeeds his brother Gunthamund after his death, and becomes king of the Vandals. Under his rule, he resumes the persecution of the Catholics.

==== Asia ====
- King Kavadh I of Persia is deposed and exiled to Susiana by his younger brother Djamasp. He is installed by the nobles to the Sassanid throne.
- Emperor Xiao Wen Di of Northern Wei starts the Sinicization process, by changing his clan name to the Han Chinese surname Yuan.

=== By topic ===
==== Religion ====
- November 21 – Gelasius I dies after a 4-year reign, and is succeeded by the Rome-born Anastasius II as the 50th pope.

== Births ==
- Childebert I, king of the Franks (d. 558)
- Erzhu Tianguang, general of Northern Wei (d. 532)
- Gao Huan, general of Northern Wei (d. 547)
- Germain, bishop of Paris (d. 576)
- Imru' al-Qais, was a pre-Islamic Arabian poet and last King of Kinda (d. 565)

== Deaths ==
- November 21 – Pope Gelasius I.
- Athanasius, Coptic Orthodox patriarch of Alexandria
- Epiphanius, bishop of Pavia (b. 438).
- Gennadius of Massilia, priest and historian.
- Gibuld, king of the Alamanni
- Gunthamund, king of the Vandals and Alans
