= Mederic =

Mederic may refer to:

- Mederic (king), a 4th-century Alemannic petty king
- Mederic (monk), a 7th-century French saint
