= Bitheridus =

Bitheridus (German: Bitherid) was a chieftain (Latin: primas) of the Bucinobantes, an Alemannic tribe. In 372, along with his kinsman Hortarius, Bitheridus served as a troop leader in the Roman army under Valentinian I.
