= Fraomar =

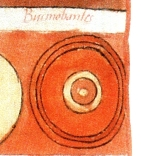
Sign of the Bucinobantes on the shields of the ancient roman army.

Fraomar (Latin: Fraomarius) was briefly the king of the Bucinobantes, an Alamannic tribe, from c.372 to 373.

In 372/3, the Roman emperor Valentinian I attacked the Alamanni and attempted to take their 'king', Macrian, prisoner. Fraomar was set up in his place, but the Alamanni were unhappy and Macrian was eventually returned to power by his supporters. In 374 Valentinian was forced to make peace with Macrian.

== Sources ==
- Ammianus Book 29.
- Drinkwater, J F The Alamanni and Rome 213-496 Oxford 2007
