= Gunzo =

7th-century duke of the Alamanni

The article is about the historical figure. For the Japanese magazine, see Gunzo.

Gunzo (also Cunzo) was a 7th-century duke of the Alamanni under Frankish sovereignty. His residence was at villa Iburninga (today's Überlingen) at Lake Constance. Gunzo was the father of Fridiburga, who was engaged to Frankish king Sigibert II (who was murdered in 613).

Gunzo organized a synod in Konstanz in 635, which resulted in the election of deacon John of Grab as bishop of Constance, succeeding the deceased bishop Gaudentius. This event is the earliest certain attestation of Constance as an independent bishopric.

It is disputed whether Gunzo ruled over all of Alemannia, or only over the eastern part. If the former is the case, he is to be identified either with Gundoin, the founder of the Moutier-Grandval monastery, or with the predecessor of the latter, duke Uncilin.
