= Brisigavi =

Germanic tribe

The Brisigavi or Brisgavi were a Germanic tribe dwelling in the southern region of the Black Forest, in south Germany, during the 5th century AD.

== Name ==
They are mentioned as Brisigaui (seniores and iuniores) on the Notitia Dignitatum (5th c. AD).

The meaning of the name is obscure. It may be a hybrid, with a Celtic first element, of uncertain meaning (brisi(o)-), and a Germanic second element (-gawi), meaning 'region, land'. Ashwin E. Gohil has proposed to translate the name as 'place of the leftovers of pressed grapes’.

Today the southern region of the Black Forest is named Breisgau.

== Geography ==
The Brisigavi lived in the southern part of the Black Forest (Abnob(ai)a Ore). Their territory was located east of Leuci, south of the Alamani, west of the Vindelici, north of the Raurici.

== History ==
The Roman historian Ammianus Marcellinus wrote in 354 that Vadomarius was the chieftain of the Brisgavi, and that he was murdered in the year 368 by his own people, influenced by the Romans.

== See also ==
- List of Germanic peoples
- Barbarian invasions
