= Neckar Suebi =

Neckar river Suebi

The Neckar Suebi (Latin: Suebi Nicrenses or Suebi Nicretes) were a Suebian people who lived within the Roman Empire in the first and second centuries AD, in the region near the Neckar river.

They were incorporated into the Roman province of Germania Superior, where their territory became the Civitas Ulpia Sueborum Nicrensium, centred on Lopodunum, modern Ladenburg.

They formed part of the population background of the region in which the Alemanni later emerged.

== History ==
Germanic groups settled in the Rhine–Neckar region during the early Roman imperial period. By around AD 100 a Suebian population was established in the lower Neckar region, which later became associated with the Roman Civitas Ulpia Sueborum Nicrensium.

Under Roman rule the Neckar Suebi were incorporated into the provincial and military structures of Germania Superior. Archaeological and epigraphic evidence nevertheless preserves their identification as Suebi associated with the Neckar region.

== Relationship to the Alemanni ==
The Neckar Suebi were one of the populations present in southwestern Germany before the appearance of the Alemanni in third-century sources. Steuer places them within a longer history of population movement into southwestern Germany, while the formation of the Alemanni involved groups arriving from a considerably wider area rather than a simple continuation of the Neckar Suebi alone.

== Sources ==
- Nuber, Hans Ulrich (1984). "Decumates agri. §§ 2–6". Reallexikon der Germanischen Altertumskunde. Vol. 5 (2 ed.). De Gruyter. pp. 273–286.
- Schlegel, Oliver (2002). "Neckarsweben § 2. Archäologisches". In Beck, Heinrich; Geuenich, Dieter; Steuer, Heiko (eds.). Reallexikon der Germanischen Altertumskunde. Vol. 21 (2 ed.). Berlin/New York: Walter de Gruyter. pp. 45–47. ISBN 978-3-11-017272-0.
- Steuer, Heiko (2021). „Germanen“ aus Sicht der Archäologie: Neue Thesen zu einem alten Thema. Berlin/Boston: De Gruyter. doi:10.1515/9783110702675. ISBN 978-3-11-070267-5.
- Wiegels, Rainer (2002). "Neckarsweben § 1. Historisches". In Beck, Heinrich; Geuenich, Dieter; Steuer, Heiko (eds.). Reallexikon der Germanischen Altertumskunde. Vol. 21 (2 ed.). Berlin/New York: Walter de Gruyter. pp. 39–45. ISBN 978-3-11-017272-0.
