= Council of Cannstatt =

The Council of Cannstatt, also referred to as the blood court at Cannstatt (Blutgericht zu Cannstatt), was a council meeting at Cannstatt, now a part of Stuttgart, in 746 that took place as a result of an invitation by the Mayor of the Palace of Austrasia, Carloman, the eldest son of Charles Martel, of all nobles of the Alemanni.

According to the annals of Metz, the annales Petaviani and an account by Childebrand, Carloman arrested several thousand noblemen who attended accusing them of taking part in the uprising of Theudebald, Duke of Alamannia and Odilo, Duke of Bavaria, and summarily executed them all for high treason. The number of deaths is a matter of debate. The action eliminated virtually the entire tribal leadership of the Alemanni and ended the independence of the duchy of Alamannia, after which it was ruled by Frankish dukes.

== Bibliography ==
- Rainer Christlein et al.: Die Alamannen. Archäologie eines lebendigen Volkes. Stuttgart 1978
- Karlheinz Fuchs, Martin Kempa, Rainer Redies: Die Alamannen (exhibition catalogue), Theiss, Stuttgart, 2001 ISBN 3-8062-1535-9 *Karlheinz Fuchs, Martin Kempa, Rainer Redies: Die Alamannen
- Dieter Geuenich: Geschichte der Alemannen. Kohlhammer Verlag, Stuttgart 2004 ISBN 3-17-018227-7, ISBN 3-17-012095-6
- Zur Geschichte der Alamannen (Wege der Forschungen), Darmstadt, 1979

== See also ==
- Blood court
- Stockholm Bloodbath (similar event in Swedish history)
- Massacre of Verden
