= Battle of Solicinium =

Battle between the Romans and Alamanni

- Part of the Roman–Alamanni conflict and Roman–Germanic Wars
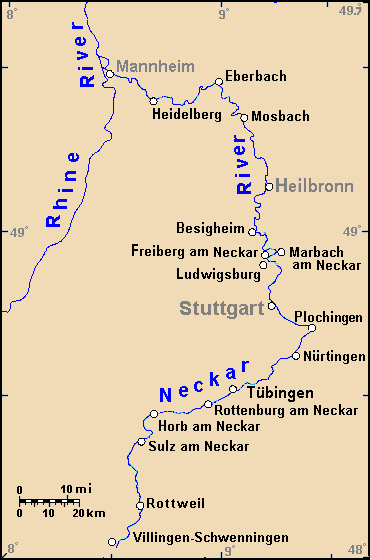
- Neckar watershed closer
Date	368 AD
Location	Southwest Germany, south of the Limes
Result	Roman victory

Belligerents
Roman Empire	Alamanni

Commanders and leaders
Valentinian I Sebastianus	Rando

Casualties and losses
Heavy	Unknown

The Battle of Solicinium was fought in 368 between the Roman army, led by Emperor Valentinian I, and an army of Alamanni invading the province of Gaul. The Romans managed to repel the Alamanni but suffered heavy losses during the battle.

== Background ==
After the death of Julian in Persia in 363, the Alemans, forgetting the treaty of truce which the emperor had extorted from them after his four successful campaigns beyond the Rhine (in 357, 358, 359, and 360), renewed their incursions into Gaul, alleging as the pretext for war the contempt of Valentinian I's ministers in failing to supply them the accustomed tribute. In the year 366 they crossed the Rhine, and after amply compensating for the remission by the plunder which they secured, retired beyond the river. The next year, when they repeated their expedition, they found the Romans prepared, for Valentinian had crossed the Alps to secure the threatened province. However, in two successive battles, they defeated his generals, signalizing their victory by the capture of several standards. The enraged emperor, after restoring by a severe sentence the discipline of the legions, entrusted the command to Jovinus, an able officer who soon proved his qualification for the appointment by the total discomfiture of the invaders. After defeating two separate detachments of the Alemani along the Moselle, he met the united forces of the nation at Chalons-Sur-Marne and amended the disgrace of the previous defeat by routing the enemy, who suffered losses of up to 10,000, as opposed to no more than 1,200 of the Romans. The remnant was driven over the Rhine, and Jovinus, after retiring to Paris for the winter, received the honours of the consulship for the next year as the reward of his success.

== Campaign of 368 ==
The celebrations for Jovinus' victory were soon interrupted by the intelligence of new disasters. Rando, a barbarian chieftain, in early 368 fell unexpectedly on the town of Moguntiacum (modern Mainz) on the Rhine, and put the defenceless inhabitants to the sword, before retiring over the river. Valentinian, furious, now determined to anticipate their future depredations by a campaign into their own territory beyond the Rhine. Count Sebastian was deputed to encircle the enemy from the south, by way of Rhaetia, while the emperor himself advanced with the entire forces of the west from Gaul. Finding their arms inadequate for the defence of their fields and villages, the Alemans retreated into the mountains, erecting their camp on an unidentified hill referred to as "Solicinium", in the area of Württemberg.

It is reported that the emperor, while on a personal reconnaissance of the enemy position on the lower reaches of the mountain, was nearly captured by an advanced party of the enemy who had been placed in ambuscade, losing his helmet and standard-bearer while retreating.

=== Battle ===
There is little known about the actual battle. It appears that Valentinian carried their defenses by a general assault, charging up the slope, and the barbarians, when they were ejected from the summit, were driven down the opposite side of the hill into the clutches of Sebastian, who had been placed in their rear to anticipate the retreat. The result was the total defeat of the Alemans.

==== Location of the battle ====
The actual location of the battle is not known and remains subject to historical speculation and disagreement. No archaeological evidence has been found so far and many of the hills in the region could be the actual site of the battle. The locations under consideration are Sulz am Neckar, Heidelberg, Schwetzingen, Rottenburg (Sülchen), Glauberg or the Spitzberg near Tübingen. All these sites are located in southwestern Germany, but spread over an area of roughly 200 km in diameter. The most recent research shows that the battle probably took place in the northern part of what is today Hechingen, and the lost city of "Solicinium" was located where the Roman museum of Hechingen is located today.

== Sources ==
- Gibbon, Edward, The Decline And Fall Of The Roman Empire, (The Modern Library, 1932), chaps. XIX., XXII., XXV.
