= Chrodobert =

Aleman dux

Chrodobert, Crodobert, or Choadebert (Crodobertus or Chrodobertus) was an Aleman dux of the early seventh century (fl. 631/632). He probably ruled in the south of the region later known as Swabia.

There is little evidence to suggest the existence of an Aleman duke in the period from c. 610 to c. 630, but Fredegar records that around 631 an Alemannic army under duke Chrodobert participated in Dagobert I's assault on the realm of the Slavs to the east. The Alemannic host (exercitus Alamannorum) was one of the three columns of the Austrasian army (exercitus regnum universum Austrasiorum). While the Alemanni won a battle at an unknown location and the Lombard allies were successful against the Slavs in the Julian Alps, the main army of Austrasian Franks under Dagobert was defeated at the Battle of Wogastisburg.

Chrodobert's authority in Alemannia probably increased after the succession of Sigebert III to the throne of Austrasia.

The relationship between Chrodobert and both earlier and later dukes of the Alemanni is unknown. It is possible that Chrodobert was the same person as the Hruodi mentioned in the passio of Saint Killian.

== Sources ==
- Geuenich, Dieter. Geschichte der Alemannen. Verlag Kohlhammer: Stuttgart, 2004. ISBN 3-17-018227-7.
- Mittelalter-Genealogie: Chrodobert.
