= Rando (king) =

4th century Alemannic King

- Occupation: Monarch

Rando was an Alemannic petty king in the 4th century. In 368, Rando invaded the city of Mogontiacum (modern-day Mainz), where the Christian festival was being celebrated (probably Easter or Pentecost). Since Roman emperor Valentinian I was stationed at Trier with his troops, Rando was free to raid with impunity. After campaigning against the Brisgavi, who had been rendered leaderless after the murder of their king Vithicabius, Valentinian conducted a revenge campaign against Rando. Rando entrenched himself at a high-altitude fortress and continued his campaign against the Romans. In an ambush at the Battle of Solicinium, Rando almost succeeded in killing Valentinian. Rando's army, encamped on a towering mountain, was soon surrounded by Valentinian's forces. After the Romans scaled the northern slope, the Alemanni fled, taking heavy casualties.

== Sources ==
- Baynes, Norman H. (1964). "The Dynasty of Valentinian and Theodosius the Great". In Bury, John Bagnell; Gwatkin, H.M; Whitney, J.P. (eds.). The Cambridge Medieval History. Vol. 1. Cambridge University Press.
- Drinkwater, John F. (2007). The Alamanni and Rome 213-496: (Caracalla to Clovis). Oxford University Press.
- Dieter Geuenich: Geschichte der Alemannen (Kohlhammer-Urban-Taschenbücher. 575). 2., überarbeitete Auflage. Kohlhammer Verlag, Stuttgart 2005, ISBN 3-17-018227-7.
