= Mederic (king) =

Alemannic petty king

Mederic (German: Mederich; Latin: Medericus) was an Alemannic petty king. His brother Chnodomarius was the petty king of another district. Mederic spent much time in Gaul, where he was introduced to ancient Greek culture. Because of this influence, Mederic gave his son Agenaric the name Serapio, after the Graeco-Egyptian god Serapis.
