= Agilo =

4th-century Roman general of Alamannic origin

- Relatives: Araxius (father-in-law)
- Military career
- Allegiance: Roman Empire
- Service years: attested 354–366
- Rank: magister peditum

Agilo was an Alemannic warrior who served multiple Roman emperors in the 4th century. Originally tribunus stabuli (354) and then tribunus gentilium et scutariorum (354–360), he was promoted to magister peditum (360–362). Under Constantius II he was sent to protect the frontier on the Tigris, while Julian appointed him to the Commission of Chalcedon but passed him over for military service. In 365 the usurper Procopius recruited Agilo to his cause; Agilo eventually defected to the legitimate emperor Valens in 366.

== Bibliography ==
- Cameron, Averil; Garnsey, Peter, eds. (1998). The Cambridge Ancient History XIII: The Late Empire, A.D. 337–425. Cambridge University Press. ISBN 978-0-521-30200-5.
  - Curran, John (1998). From Jovian to Theodosius. pp. 78–110., in Cameron et al (1998)
- Jones, Martindale & Morris. The Prosopography of the Later Roman Empire 3 vols. Cambridge University Press.(see Prosopography of the Later Roman Empire)
  - Jones, Arnold Hugh Martin; Martindale, J. R.; Morris, John, eds. (1971). Volume 1, AD 260-395. Cambridge University Press. ISBN 978-0-521-07233-5.
- Otto Seeck: Agilo. in: Paulys Realencyclopädie der classischen Altertumswissenschaft (RE). Band I,1, Stuttgart 1893, col. 809.
