= Gibuld =

Alamanic king

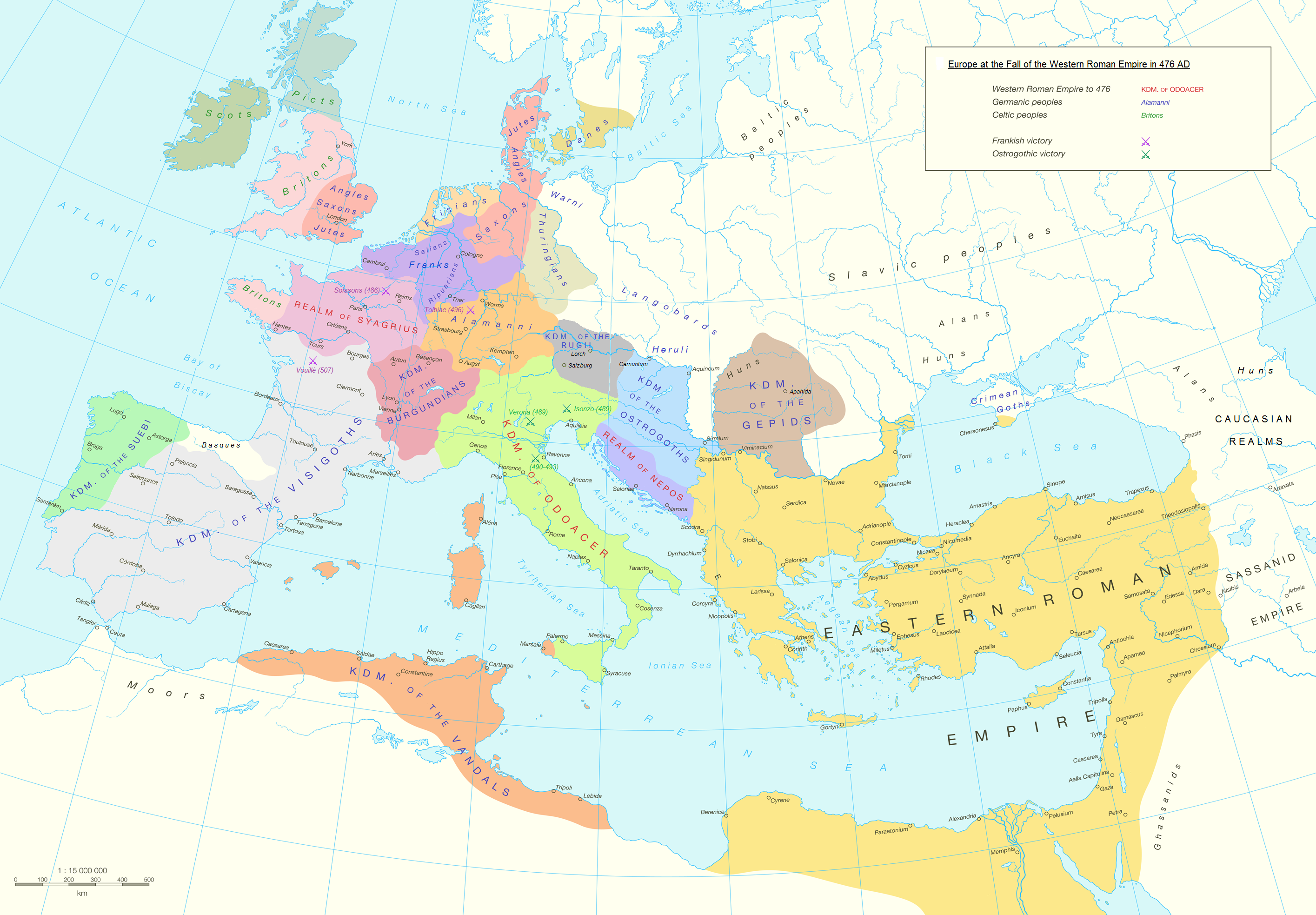
Europe in the late 5th century.

Gibuld (fl. 470) was the last known king of the Alamanni before the defeat of the Alamanni at the battle of Tolbiac in 496.

== Attestations ==
Gibuld is known from two hagiographic sources, the contemporary (470s) Vita Severini by Eugippius, where his name is Latinized as Gibuldus, and the later Vita Lupi where it is rendered Gebavultus. The independence of the two accounts has been debated in scholarship. It is clear that the Vita Lupi preserves the older form of the name (which is interpreted as it were from Common Germanic *Gebō-wulþuz "gift-splendour"), which would mean that if the passage in the Vita Lupi depends on the Vita Severini, it would have to be based on an early version of that text, now lost.

Another suggestion was that Gibuldus and Gebavultus may in fact have been two princes from the same noble family, but not necessarily the same individual. But the predominant opinion appears to be that the two accounts are independent, and that the recurrence of the name supports the thesis that the Alamanni, formerly divided among numerous petty tribal kingships, by the late 5th century had become united under a single king.

According to Eugippius, Gibuld used to harry Passau, until he was asked by Saint Severinus of Noricum to free his Roman hostages. Gibuld was so impressed by the Christian abbot that he agreed to free seventy of his prisoners. The Vita Lupi tells a similar story about with Lupus in the role of Severinus. If the two accounts are considered independent, this would suggest that the hostages episode reflects a historical event, although it remains open whether it took place at Passau, Troyes, or yet elsewhere. In either case, Gibuld's floruit would have been close to AD 470.

Alemannia in the mid 5th century was situated to the east to two Arian kingdoms in Gaul, that of the Burgundians and that of the Visigoths. Some scholars (Schubert 1909) have speculated that due to Visigothic influence Gibuld may also have adopted the Arian confession, while it is clear that the greater part of the Alamannic population remained pagan well into the 6th century.
