= Hariobaudes =

Alemannic petty king

Hariobaudes (German: Hariobaud) was an Alemannic petty king in the 4th century AD. The Roman writer Ammianus Marcellinus reports that Julian crossed the Rhine at Mainz in 359 and concluded a peace treaty with the Alemannic kings Hariobaud, Macrian, Urius, Ursicinus, Vadomarius and Vestralpus after they agreed to return all prisoners.

== Sources ==
- Hermann Reichert: Hariobaudus. In: Reallexikon der Germanischen Altertumskunde (RGA). 2. Auflage. Band 14, Walter de Gruyter, Berlin / New York 1999, ISBN 3-11-016423-X, S. 10–12.
- Dieter Geuenich: Geschichte der Alemannen (Kohlhammer-Urban-Taschenbücher. 575). 2., überarbeitete Auflage. Kohlhammer Verlag, Stuttgart 2005, ISBN 3-17-018227-7.
