= Vithicabius =

Alemannic petty king from 360 to 368

Vithicabius (German: Vithicab) was an Alemannic petty king from 360 to 368. He was a son of Vadomarius, and succeeded his father as king after the latter had been banished to Hispania by emperor Julian. He had grown up in Roman custody. Ammianus Marcellinus describes Vithicabius as a physically weak, but a brave and aggressive leader. Although having promised Julian to maintain peace, Vithicabius continued raiding Roman territory. He was assassinated in 368 under Valentinian I by a bribed servant, but the Alemannic raids on Roman territory continued nevertheless.

== Sources ==
- Julius Cramer: Die Geschichte der Alamannen als Gaugeschichte (= Untersuchungen zur deutschen Staats- und Rechts-Geschichte. H. 57, ISSN 0083-4572). Marcus, Breslau 1899, (Neudruck. Scientia, Aalen 1971, ISBN 3-511-04057-4).
- Dieter Geuenich: Die alemannischen Breisgaukönige Gundomadus und Vadomarius. In: Sebastian Brather, Dieter Geuenich, Christoph Huth (Hrsg.): Historia archaeologica. Festschrift für Heiko Steuer zum 70. Geburtstag (= Reallexikon der germanischen Altertumskunde. Ergänzungsbände. Band 70). de Gruyter, Berlin u. a. 2009, ISBN 978-3-11-022337-8, S. 205–216.
- Dieter Geuenich: Geschichte der Alemannen (Kohlhammer-Urban-Taschenbücher. 575). 2., überarbeitete Auflage. Kohlhammer Verlag, Stuttgart 2005, ISBN 3-17-018227-7.
