= Macrian =

Macrian or Makrian (Latin: Macrianus) was the king of the Bucinobantes, an Alemannic tribe, in the late fourth century and the brother of Hariobaudes. Macrian tried to confederate all the north Germanic and Alemannic tribes together against Rome.

According to Ammianus Marcellinus, In 359 Julian the Apostate took Mogontiacum (Mainz on the Rhine) and, after the exchange of prisoners, made treaties of peace with the various Alemanni kings, Macrian, Hariobaudes, Urius, Ursicinus, Vadomarius, and Vestralpus.

Due to continuing unrest, however, the emperor Valentinian I, in the year 370, invaded Alemannia and deposed Macrian, whom he labelled turbarum rex artifex ("king and crafter of unrest"). With the help of deserters, Macrian was captured and imprisoned. In his place was set up Fraomar, but the Bucinobantes would not accept him and he was expelled and Macrian restored. In 371 Valentinian was forced to grant Macrian an alliance; the Bucinobantes became foederati of Rome and loyal allies in the war with the Franks.

Macrian was killed on campaign against the Franks, in an ambush laid by their king Mallobaudes.

== Sources ==
- Thompson, E. A. Romans and Barbarians: The Decline of the Western Empire. Madison: University of Wisconsin Press, 1982. ISBN 0-299-08700-X.
- Geuenich, Dieter. Geschichte der Alemannen. Kohlhammer Verlag: Stuttgart, 2004. ISBN 3-17-018227-7.
- Castritius, H. "Macrianus." in Reallexikon der Germanischen Altertumskunde. Vol. 19, pp. 90–92.
