= Vestralpus =

Vestralpus (German: Vestralp) was an Alemannic petty king of the Bucinobantes in the 4th century AD. The Roman historian Ammianus Marcellinus reports that Julian crossed the Rhine at Mainz in 359 and concluded peace treaties with the Alemannic kings Vestralpus, Macrian, Hariobaudes, Urius, Ursicinus and Vadomarius after they had returned all Roman prisoners.

== Sources ==
- Rainer Christlein: Die Alamannen. Archäologie eines lebendigen Volkes. Theiss, Stuttgart u. a. 1978, ISBN 3-8062-0190-0.
- Thorsten Fischer: Vestralp. In: Reallexikon der Germanischen Altertumskunde (RGA). 2. Auflage. Band 32, Walter de Gruyter, Berlin / New York 2006, ISBN 3-11-018387-0, S. 309–310.
- Karlheinz Fuchs, Martin Kempa, Rainer Redies (Red.): Die Alamannen. 4. Auflage, Lizenzausgabe. Theiß, Stuttgart 2001, ISBN 3-8062-1535-9 (Ausstellungskatalog).
- Dieter Geuenich: Geschichte der Alemannen (= Kohlhammer-Urban-Taschenbücher. 575). 2., überarbeitete Auflage. Kohlhammer Verlag, Stuttgart 2005, ISBN 3-17-018227-7
