= Barbatio =

Roman army officer

Barbatio (died AD 359) was a Roman general of the infantry (Magister Peditum = Master of Foot) under the command of Constantius II. Previously he was a commander of the household troops (protectores domestici) under Gallus Caesar, but he arrested Gallus under the instruction of Constantius, thereby ensuring his promotion on the death of Claudius Silvanus. In 359, both he and his wife Assyria were arrested and beheaded for treason against Constantius, possibly as part of a plot by Arbitio, a senior cavalry commander (Magister Equitum = Master of Horse), and another exponent of the forms of scheming and political intrigue that became such a part of the later Roman Empire.

== Fall of Gallus ==
Barbatio, a soldier of unknown origin, began his rise when he was appointed to command the household troops of Caesar Gallus, a cousin of Constantius II. When Gallus fell out of favor with the emperor, it was Barbatio who arrested him and stripped him of his imperial attire. The Caesar was taken to Pola, where he was beheaded, and his face mutilated after execution. For his part in the affair, Barbatio was awarded by Constantius with a series of promotions, making him commander of the infantry in Gaul after the death of Claudius Silvanus in 355. According to Ammianus, Barbatio was a man of "rough manners and vaulting ambition, who incurred general hatred by his treacherous betrayal of Caesar Gallus". Having betrayed one Caesar, he soon found himself in a position to attempt to betray another.

== Barbatio and Julian ==
Not long after the death of Gallus, Constantius summoned Julian, the dead man's half-brother, from his studies in Athens to the royal court in Milan. There he was married to Helena, the emperor’s sister, and promoted to the rank of Caesar.

In 357, Julian's second year as Caesar, plans were laid for an offensive against the Alamanni, the most dangerous of the enemy tribes. It was intended that two armies, the first commanded by Julian and the second by Barbatio, would advance in a classic Roman tactic known as a forceps or forfex, forming diverging wings, embracing and destroying the enemy. Julian then marched from his camp in Sens to Reims, while Barbatio moved north with 25,000 troops from Italy to Raetia. While these moves were underway another German tribe, the Laeti, passed between both armies and attacked Lyons. Julian sent three elite cavalry squadrons to intercept them, attacking and killing a large number as they returned from the raid loaded with booty. The survivors fled past Barbatio's camp unchallenged. The commander excused himself to the Emperor by blaming others for his neglect of duty.

Still later, Julian asked Barbatio for some boats to form a pontoon bridge over the Rhine to pursue another enemy tribe. Barbatio simply had the boats burned. Supplies intended for Julian's army were also destroyed. Eventually the planned pincer movement was frustrated when Barbatio, in the words of Ammianus, "…as if he had ended the campaign successfully, distributed his soldiers in winter quarters and returned to the Emperor's court to frame some charges against Caesar, as was his custom." His departure left Julian open to attack, but against all expectations he defeated the Alemanni at the Battle of Strasbourg. Constantius, in distant Milan, immediately claimed the victory as his own.

Edward Gibbon hypothesized that Barbatio, who escaped all reprimand, could have only acted as he did under instruction. Gibbon wrote in The History of the Decline and Fall of the Roman Empire, "But the hopes of the campaign were defeated by the incapacity, or the enemy, or the secret instructions of Barbatio; who acted more as if he had been an enemy of the Caesar and a secret ally of the Barbarians"

== Treason and death ==
In 359, with Barbatio away on another campaign, his wife, Assyria, whom Ammanius describes as an "indiscreet and silly woman", decided to write to him, seemingly fearful that he was about to cast her off. Her letter, which has not survived, hinted, in Ammianus' account, at Barbatio's own imperial ambitions, and his possible intention of marrying the empress Eusebia in the event of Constantius' death. It was not composed by Assyria herself, but by a female slave, who had formerly belonged to Silvanus, and may possibly have harboured some grudge towards her new owners. The servant immediately took a copy of this letter to Arbitio, suggesting that the whole thing was part of an elaborate plot. Arbitio at once brought the matter to the attention of Constantius. Barbatio was arrested and confessed that he had received the letter. Both he and Assyria were subsequently executed.

There is no evidence at all that Barbatio actually planned to murder Constantius. According to some historians, it seems more likely that, following his usual pattern of behaviour, he simply wished to ingratiate himself still further with the Emperor, with the possible hope of becoming a co-emperor. It is also questionable if the incriminating letter contained Assyria's actual words.

== See also ==
- Roman army
- List of Roman generals

== Sources ==
- Hunt, David (1998), "Julian", The Cambridge Ancient History, vol. XIII: the Late Empire AD 337–425, Cambridge: University Press
- Jones, A.H.M.; J.R. Martindale & J. Morris (1971). Prosopography of the Later Roman Empire. Vol. 1. Cambridge University Press. ISBN 0-521-07233-6.
- Potter, David S. (2004). The Roman Empire at Bay: AD 180–395. New York: Routledge. ISBN 0-415-10057-7.
