= Chrocus =

Ancient Alamannic ruler

Chrocus or Crocus (fl. 260–306 AD) was a leader of the Alamanni in the late 3rd to early 4th centuries. In 260, he led an uprising of the Alamanni against the Roman Empire, traversing the Upper Germanic Limes and advancing as far as Clermont-Ferrand, and possibly as far as Ravenna, and he was possibly present at the Alamannic conquest of the French town of Mende.

According to Gregory of Tours' History of the Franks, Chrocus was a famous king of his time and was responsible for a great deal of destruction throughout Gaul, most notably of all ancient temples located in Gaul, though this may have been exaggerated. One of the temples he allegedly tore down was called the Vasso Galatæ, a marvelous structure that once stood in Clermont.

Chrocus, with his troops, aided Constantine I's proclamation as emperor. In 306, he was present as a general in Roman service at the death of Constantius Chlorus in York, Britannia, and called for his son Constantine to be declared the new Roman Emperor (Epitome de Caesaribus 41).

== Literature ==
- Dieter Geuenich, Geschichte der Alemannen, Kohlhammer Verlag Stuttgart 2004, ISBN 3-17-018227-7 / ISBN 3-17-012095-6
