= Ursicinus (king) =

Ursicinus was an Alemannic petty king in the 4th century AD. The Roman historian Ammianus Marcellinus notes that Julian defeated the Alemannic kings Ursicinus, Macrian, Hariobaudes, Urius, Vadomarius and Vestralpus at the Battle of Strasbourg in 357. Apparently, no general Alemannic kingship existed. The groups only acted together in larger military campaigns. According to recent research it is possible that Ursicinus and the other Alemannic commanders only sent troops, rather than participating in the battle themselves. In 359 Julian crossed the Rhine at Mainz. After the Romans had devastated Alemannic territory, the Alemanni agreed to return all prisoners and to conduct a peace treaty. Ursicinus is not mentioned in the sources again.

== Sources ==
- Thomas Fischer: Ursicinus. In: Reallexikon der Germanischen Altertumskunde (RGA). 2. Auflage. Band 31, Walter de Gruyter, Berlin / New York 2006, ISBN 3-11-018386-2, S. 562–563.
