= Urius =

Alemannic petty king

Urius (German: Ur) was an Alemannic petty king in the 4th century AD. The Roman writer Ammianus Marcellinus reports that Julian crossed the Rhine at Mainz in 359 and concluded a peace treaty with the Alemannic kings Urius, Hariobaudes, Macrian, Vadomarius, Ursicinus and Vestralpus.

== Sources ==
- Thorsten Fischer: Urius. In: Reallexikon der Germanischen Altertumskunde (RGA). 2. Auflage. Band 31, Walter de Gruyter, Berlin / New York 2006, ISBN 3-11-018386-2, S. 544–545.
- Dieter Geuenich: Geschichte der Alemannen (= Kohlhammer Verlag, Urban-Taschenbücher. 575). 2., überarbeitete Auflage. Kohlhammer, Stuttgart 2005, ISBN 3-17-018227-7.
