= Agenaric =

Alemanni prince, son of king Mederic

- Father: Mederic

Agenaric (German: Agenarich; Latin: Agenarichus), also called Serapio, was an Alemannic prince in the 4th century. Agenaric was the son of petty king Mederic and the nephew of another petty king, Chnodomarius. In 357, together with his uncle, Agenaric commanded the Alemannic army at the Battle of Strasbourg, in which the Alemanni were defeated by Julian.
