= Gundomadus =

Gundomad (Latin: Gundomadus; ? – 357 AD) or Gundomar, was an Alemannic petty king in the area around Breisgau, Germany in the 4th century. The Roman historian Ammianus Marcellinus reports that Gundomad, together with his brother Vadomarius, in 354 concluded a peace treaty at Augst after having been defeated in battle by Emperor Constantius II. In 357, Gundomad was killed by his own people for having been too loyal to the Romans. They then made an uprising against Emperor Julian.

== Sources ==
- Dieter Geuenich: Gundomad. In: Reallexikon der Germanischen Altertumskunde (RGA). 2. Auflage. Band 13, Walter de Gruyter, Berlin / New York 1999, ISBN 3-11-016315-2, S. 216.
- Dieter Geuenich: Geschichte der Alemannen (= Kohlhammer-Urban-Taschenbücher. 575). 2., überarbeitete Auflage. Kohlhammer Verlag, Stuttgart 2005, ISBN 3-17-018227-7.
- Dieter Geuenich: Die alemannischen Breisgaukönige Gundomadus und Vadomarius. In: Sebastian Brather, Dieter Geuenich, Christoph Huth (Hrsg.): Historia archaeologica. Festschrift für Heiko Steuer zum 70. Geburtstag (= Reallexikon der germanischen Altertumskunde. Ergänzungsbände. Band 70). de Gruyter, Berlin u. a. 2009, ISBN 978-3-11-022337-8, S. 205–216.
