= Chnodomarius =

4th-century AD warleader of the Alamanni

Chnodomar (Latinized Chnodomarius) was the king of an Alamannic canton in what is now south-west Germany, near the Rhine from sometime before 352 till 357. He seems to have had a recognized position among the other Alamanni.

== Early career ==
The Alemanni were a confederacy of Germanic tribes believed to have first migrated to the west early in the 3rd century AD. In 352 they invaded Gaul, supposedly incited by Constantius II, during the rebellion of Magnentius, whose brother Decentius was defeated in a battle with Chnodomarius. After the fall of Magnentius, the Alemanni refused to relinquish the territory and spoils which they had acquired in Gaul. Foiling Constantius' attempts to eject them, they ravaged the country and occupied the suburbs of the principal cities. Chnodomarius, as one of the most powerful of the Alemannic kings, assumed a prominent place in the conduct of the war, and allegedly convinced the other kings to break the agreement with Constantius after the usurper's death.

== Battle of Strasbourg ==
Chnodomarius is known to have commanded the army which defeated the Roman Magister Peditum (Master of Foot) Barbatio in 357, driving him south to Augst, and disabling him from further action during the campaign. A simultaneous pincer movement had been conceived by the Romans, Barbatio marching right of the Rhine from near Basel with 25,000 men while the Caesar Julian attacked from the left towards Strasbourg with 13,000. Barbatio's defeat negated this plan, and also stranded Julian in enemy territory, near Saverne. Chnodomarius, confident after overcoming Barbatio's numerically superior army, learned Julian's location from a Roman deserter and decided to attack.

The full force of the Alemannic confederation, iterated by Ammianus as seven kings, ten petty princes, and thirty-five thousand common soldiers, assembled at Strasbourg. Chnodomarius, along with his nephew Serapio, was entrusted by the confederate chiefs with overall command, in deference to his superior might and his successes against Decentius and Barbatio. Julian retained his self-confidence in the emergency, and in the ensuing battle he won a complete victory. Chnodomarius commanded the left of the Alemannic forces during the battle, composed chiefly of cavalry, and by a skillful stratagem (and an interesting early example of combined-arms warfare) he contrived to drive the heavy cavalry of the Romans in a panic from the field. Julian rallied the fleeing Clibanarii and led them back into battle, but the defeat of the Alemanni was due principally to determined fighting by the Roman infantry.

Chnodomarius and the other Alemannic chiefs dismounted before the battle at the insistence of the Alemannic tribesmen, who feared their leaders might desert them if things went badly. Apparently, their fears were justified; as soon as the tide of battle turned in Julian's favour, Chnodomarius and a small body of retainers made discreetly for a boat which was waiting on the riverbank. They were intercepted by Roman soldiers, who recognized the king by his impressive armour, and Chnodomarius was brought to Julian's tent as a prisoner.

== Death ==
After repeatedly assuring the disheartened chieftain of his safety as sacred to the honour of the Empire, Julian dispatched him in chains to the court of Constantius, where he was treated with conspicuous honour. Regardless, he died not long after in the Imperial city, the victim reportedly of a commonplace illness, perhaps exacerbated by the bitterness of his exile and defeat.

== Character ==
Ammianus Marcellinus, in his account of the Battle of Strasbourg, describes Chnodomarius as "brave as a warrior and general, eminent for skill above his fellows", and very large and strong, even by barbarian standards. Pride in his physical prowess contributed to the king's blustering demeanour, which, Ammianus claims with satisfaction, disappeared after the defeat at Strasbourg. Chnodomarius was allegedly brought before Julian in an abject and frightened condition, throwing himself on the ground and pleading for mercy until the bemused Caesar stopped him with a reassuring speech.
