= Bucinobantes =

Germanic tribe

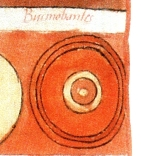
Sign of the Bucinobantes on the shields of the ancient Roman army

The Bucinobantes (German: Bucinobanten) were an Alemannic tribe in the region of the modern city of Mainz on the river Main.

The Roman historian Ammianus Marcellinus wrote that Caesar Julian crossed the river Rhine near Mainz in 359 for negotiations with Macrian, the chieftain of the Bucinobantes, and with other Alamannic chiefs.

After several rebellions against the Roman Empire, the emperor Valentinian I failed in his attempt (with the support of the Burgundians) to arrest Macrian. Valentinian appointed Fraomar as chieftain of the Bucinobantes, but they refused to accept the appointment. In the end Valentinian was forced in 371 to agree to an alliance with Macrian.

Possibly as part of a deal with Macrian, in 371 Valentinian relocated Fraomar and his followers from Mainz to Britain.

== Sources ==
- Thompson, E. A. Romans and Barbarians: The Decline of the Western Empire. Madison: University of Wisconsin Press, 1982. ISBN 0-299-08700-X.
