= Vadomarius =

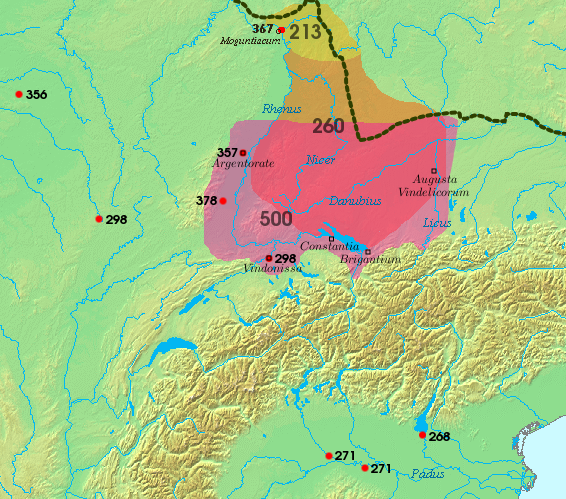
Area settled by the Alemanni, and sites of Roman-Alemannic battles, 3rd to 6th centuries

Vadomarius (German: Vadomar) was an Alemannic king and Roman general, who shared power with his brother Gundomadus. After instigating an indecisive campaign in Gaul against the Romans, Vadomarius and his brother signed a treaty with the Roman emperor Constantius II in AD 356. Encouraged by Constantius II, Vadomarius employed his Alemanni forces in an attack against Julian (Constantius' Caesar who had revolted against his rule). Vadomarius then concluded a treaty with Julian, after which, he unsuccessfully attempted to play the two Roman figures against one another. When Julian was made aware of this, he arrested Vadomarius and banished him to Hispania. His son Vithicabius succeeded him as king. Later, Vadomarius allied himself with Rome under emperors Jovian and Valens, leading his forces against the usurper Procopius and fighting the Persians on Rome's behalf.

== Life ==
The life of Vadomarius is best documented by the Roman historian Ammianus Marcellinus. According to his writings, Constantius II explicitly went to Valentia to wage war against Vadomarius and Gundomadus, whose forces had been laying waste to parts of Gaul. In 356, Vadomarius and his brother Gundomadus concluded a peace treaty with the Romans after having lost a battle against emperor Constantius II.

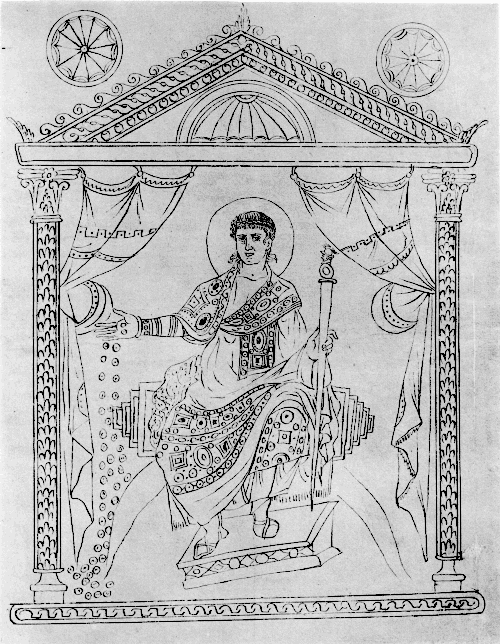
The emperor Constantius II (ruled 337–61), Julian's cousin and superior. One of the three sons and successors of Constantine I the Great, he survived his two brothers to become sole emperor in 350. He is portrayed with a halo, as were most Christian emperors of the period. Portrait on a manuscript of the Chronography of 354, Rome

After Gundomadus was treacherously killed by his own people in 357, the Alemanni rallied themselves under Vadomarius, while remaining an ally of Constantius II. Julian's rise to power and Vadomarius' decision to stand by Constantius II was likely the result of intimidation, which subsequently led him to join and lead the Alamannic coalition in AD 357. It is possible that Vadomarius even may have supplied troops to fight against other Germanic tribesman during the Battle of Strasbourg. The evidence for this stems from the fact that he continued acting as an agent of Constantius II in sorting out the mess following the battle—meanwhile, he also kept an eye on Julian. In this regard, historian John F. Drinkwater argues that "Vadomarius should be regarded as Roman." Constantius II even granted Vadomarius and the Alemanni rights to settle along the western bank of the Rhine. Seeking to use the Alemanni against Julian the Apostate, Constantius II then incited the Germanic Alemanni to march upon his erstwhile competitor in the East, having established trust with them. However, Julian's military power was greater than expected and in 359, he crossed the Rhine near Mainz with his forces and scattered his enemies; thereafter he concluded peace treaties with the Alemannic kings Vadomarius, Macrian, Hariobaudes, Urius, Ursicinus and Vestralpus.

In 360, Vadomarius attacked areas along the border of Tyrol, which greatly grieved Julian since it violated the recent treaty. Vadomarius was carrying out these raids along the border areas per the urging of Constantius II, which were outlined in letters between the two. When Julian learned of these messages, he was incensed and invited Vadomarius to a banquet, at which he was arrested and placed under guard. Vadomarius was subsequently banished to Spain.

After being a Spain for a brief period, Vadomarius then had a distinguished career in the Roman army, rising to the position of dux of Phoenice. Under emperor Valens, Vadomarius employed siege-warfare techniques he would have learned as a Roman soldier to besiege the supporters of the usurper Procopius in Nicaea. He is last heard from fighting against the Persians in Mesopotamia in 371. Vadomarius was succeeded as king by his son Vithicabius, who much like his father, was considered a threat to Rome. The emperor Gratian had Vithicabius murdered when his loyalty to the Roman throne "became suspect." The story of both Vadomarius and his son reveal the manner in which Romans handled their barbarian neighbors, co-opting and recruiting them when it suited their needs but against whom they often used treacherous means.

== See also ==
- Muderic
