= Alemanni =

Germanic people

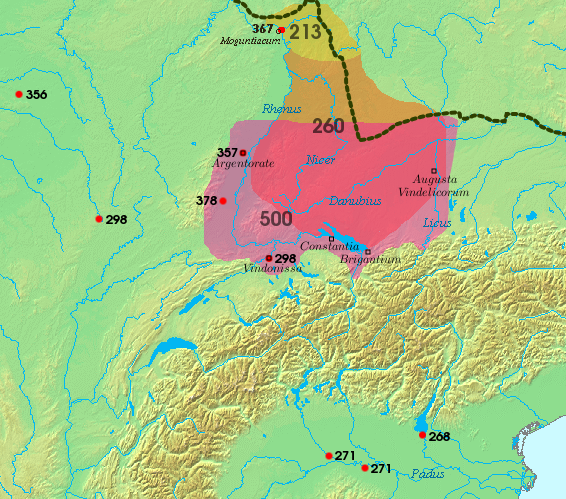
Area settled by the Alemanni, and sites of Roman–Alemannic battles, 3rd to 6th centuries

The Alemanni or Alamanni were a confederation of Germanic peoples who first appeared in the region east of the Upper Rhine river during the third century AD. By about 260 AD they had taken control of a large swathe of lands in Roman territory in the province of Germania Superior, including the so-called Agri Decumates, and they later expanded into present-day Alsace and northern Switzerland. Already in the third century their country was referred to as Alamannia. The area settled by the Alemanni corresponds roughly to the area where Alemannic German dialects remain spoken, including German Baden-Württemberg and southwestern Bavaria, French Alsace, German-speaking Switzerland, Liechtenstein and Austrian Vorarlberg.

The first apparent written mention of the Alemanni that has survived is in reports of the works of Cassius Dio. Surviving reports of his work mention them in the context of a campaign of Roman emperor Caracalla in 213 AD. The earliest undoubted contemporary mention of the Alemanni under that name is a panegyric delivered for Maximian in 289. In 496 AD, after the fall of the Western Roman Empire, the Alemanni were conquered by the Frankish leader Clovis and incorporated into the Frankish empire.

Under the Franks, the Alemanni were gradually converted to Christianity during the 7th century, and the Lex Alamannorum, recording their customary law, was made during this period. In 746, Carloman ended an uprising by summarily executing all Alemannic nobility at the blood court at Cannstatt, and for the following century, Alemannia was ruled by Frankish dukes. Following the treaty of Verdun of 843, Alemannia became a province of the eastern kingdom of Louis the German, the precursor of the Holy Roman Empire. The duchy persisted until 1268.

The medieval successors of the Alemanni are known in English as Swabians, a name which is still used in some cultural and regional contexts today, and their country eventually came to be called Swabia (German: Schwaben), which is a name used today to refer to Württemberg and neighbouring southwestern Bavaria. From about the fifth century, written records already occasionally referred to the Alemanni with an old name, Suebi, that had traditionally been used by Roman writers to refer to a category of Germanic peoples found in several parts of Europe. Whether earlier Alemanni had seen themselves as Suebi is however unclear. From the ninth century, Alamannia was increasingly used only for Alsace, west of the Rhine, while the Alamannic territory in general was increasingly called the Duchy of Swabia. By the 12th century, the name Suebia had mostly replaced Alamannia. Instead, in French Allemagne became the more general name of Germany. Influenced by French usage similar terms are found in a number of other languages, including Spanish and Middle English, which commonly used the term Almains for Germans.

== Name ==
The name Alamanni is generally analysed as a Germanic compound of *ala- and *man(n)-, the latter meaning "man" or "person". The precise sense of the compound is disputed. Rübekeil interprets *ala- as having a collective or universal sense, and understands the name approximately as "the Manni as a whole" or "the totality of the Manni", rather than as "men from all tribes". Haubrichs argues that *ala- could instead have an intensifying sense, so that the name may have meant something like "true", "complete", or "pre-eminent men".

The sixth-century historian Agathias, citing a tradition which he attributed to Gaius Asinius Quadratus in the third century, reports that the Alemanni were "gathered together and mixed" people and that their name expressed this character. Modern linguistic discussions do not generally treat this as the literal meaning of a different name formation. Rather, Rübekeil and Haubrichs both interpret it as a hostile or mocking reinterpretation of a Germanic name whose components were transparent.

An older proposal that the first element was *alah "sanctuary" is incompatible with the early spellings of the name and is not accepted by scholars anymore.

=== As a name for modern Germans ===
The French-language name of Germany, Allemagne, is derived from the name of the Alemanni, from Old French aleman(t), and from French was loaned into a number of other languages, including Middle English, which commonly used the term Almains for Germans. Likewise, the Arabic name for Germany is ألمانيا (Almanya), the Turkish is Almanya, the Catalan is Alemanya, the Spanish is Alemania, the Portuguese is Alemanha, the Welsh is Yr Almaen and the Persian is آلمان (Alman).

== Relationship with the Suebi ==
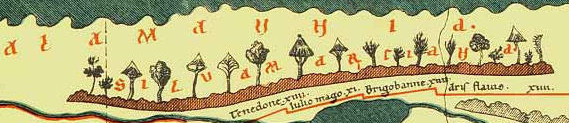
Alamannia is shown beyond Silva Marciana (the Black Forest) in the Tabula Peutingeriana. Suevia is indicated separately, further downstream of the Rhine, beyond Silva Vosagus.

Modern scholars think it is probable that Suebian groups such as the Neckar Suebi and Semnones contributed to the ancestry of the Alemanni. On the other hand, although the two terms Alemanni and Suebi gradually became interchangeable in later centuries, the reasons for this are unclear today, and it is unclear whether any third or fourth century Alemanni would have seen themselves as Suebi. In this period the term Suebi was not normally associated by Roman authors with the Alemanni, but most often with the neighbours and allies of the Marcomanni and Quadi who lived north of the Danube.

The distinction is also visible in the early fourth-century Laterculus Veronensis, probably compiled in 314. In its geographically ordered list of peoples near the Rhine, it gives the sequence Burgunziones Alamanni Sueui Franci ... Iotungi, treating the Alemanni, Suebi and Juthungi as separate names within the same broad region. The distinction is also reflected in the Tabula Peutingeriana, which shows Svevia and Alamannia as neighbouring but separate regions beyond the Rhine. The surviving map is medieval, and these particular labels have sometimes been regarded as later additions, but Liccardo argues that they could preserve a late antique geographical scheme: the name Alamannia was already in Roman use by 297/298, and the separate representation of Svevia and Alamannia fits a period when the two names had not yet become synonymous.

There are on the other hand some indications of a Suebian association in early records. A third century monument associates the Juthungi with the Semnones, who were known to Romans as one of the main Suebian peoples, and in the fourth century, Ammianus Marcellinus described the Juthungi as a division of the Alemanni (Alamannorum pars). Another special case is the fourth-century poet Ausonius, who described his captive Bissula as a "Suebian girl", although he located her homeland beyond the Rhine near the sources of the Danube, in an area otherwise associated with the Alemanni. This may however have been literary or archaizing rather than proof that the names Suebi and Alemanni were normally interchangeable in the fourth century.

A distinction between the names of the Suebi and Alemanni continues to appear in some documents even after the fourth century. For example, writing about fifth-century events, the 6th-century writer Jordanes described a group of Suebi who moved from the east under the rule of a leader named Hunimund, after he lost a battle with the Ostrogoths. He reported that they settled together with the Alemanni, but treats them as a distinct group living in the same area. By the time of the Ravenna Cosmography, compiled around 700, the names Suebi and Alamanni had become interchangeable, and the corresponding regional names were likewise equated in geographical writing. In the ninth century the two names could be treated explicitly as synonyms. Walafrid Strabo, himself writing in Alemannia, stated that Alamanni and Suebi were two names for the same gens. According to him, neighbouring Latin-speaking peoples used the former, while local Germanic usage employed the latter.

== Origins and background ==
Before the third century, much of the region east of the Rhine where the Alemanni later became established was under Roman control, but Germanic groups had been settling there since the first century AD. Around the lower Neckar, a Suebian population known as the Neckar Suebi (Suebi Nicretes) was centred on Lopodunum (Ladenburg), and their settlement community later developed into the Roman Civitas Ulpia Sueborum Nicretum. The connection between these populations and the later Alemanni is unclear, but connections are likely.

Scholars today doubt that the Alemanni migrated into the region in the third century as a single organized group. The prevailing view instead sees the third century Alemanni as a people with diverse origins, who formed their new identity partly in response to the new conditions created by the Roman abandonment of the Upper German–Raetian limes (military border). Archaeological evidence likewise suggests origins among several different groups rather than a single migrating population.

Another likely driver of change was that the wider Germanic world was itself undergoing major changes in the third century, as a result of the Marcomannic Wars in 166–180. The archaeological evidence indicates that the Alemanni had connections to regions involved in those wars including Bohemia, and central and northern Germany. Scholars suggest that new confederations emerged, eventually including the Alemanni, partly in response to the massive disruption to older political groupings and elites caused by the wars. The Alemanni and Juthungi were not named in accounts of the Marcomannic wars, and may not have existed yet. However for example the Semnones were directly affected by the second century wars, and they were later associated with the Juthungi in a third-century Roman monument.

== Earliest mentions ==
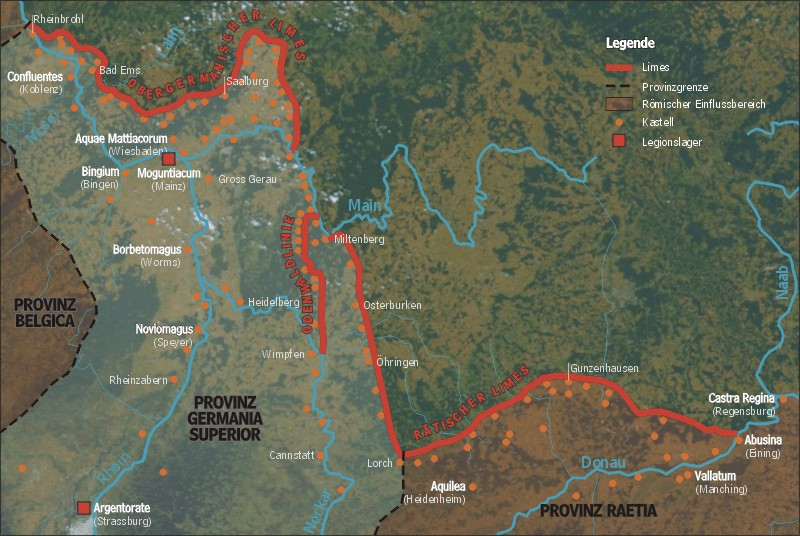
The Limes Germanicus 83 to 260 CE

The earliest undoubted contemporary mention of the Alemanni under that name is a panegyric delivered for Maximian in 289, although many scholars accept evidence that the name was used much earlier. The early history of the Alemanni, like their northern neighbours the Franks, is difficult to reconstruct because before the late third-century contemporary sources mainly describe the enemies of the Romans near the Rhine using broad terms such as Germani or simply barbari. In later centuries, classical writers sometimes identified groups who had been involved in third-century events as Alemanni or Franks. Notably for example, the third-century Juthungi are specifically described as Alemanni in the fourth century. However, modern scholars consider such later mentions to be uncertain, because possibly anachronistic.

A strong but uncertain contender for the earliest possible written references to the Alemanni may be reflected in the surviving fragments of Cassius Dio's account of Caracalla's German campaign of 213, but this is not universally accepted. The relevant portion of Dio's work no longer survives, but parts are preserved in the Constantinian Excerpta de virtutibus et vitiis, other Byzantine excerpts, and the later epitome of John Xiphilinus. The Excerpta de virtutibus et vitiis uses the Greek form Ἀλαμβαννοί, implying Alambanni, on several occasions, and Ἀλβανοί (Albani) on one occasion, while also naming the Chatti (Χάττοι) as being involved in these events. The Excerpta de sententiis, in a passage attributed to Peter the Patrician, who was using Dio for this period, implies Albanni (Ancient Greek: Ἀλβαννοί). Xiphilinus calls another group involved in the campaign Κέννοι (Kenni), but the identity of this group is unclear, and the name may for example represent the Chatti rather than the Alemanni. Scholars therefore disagree about whether Dio really mentioned the Alemanni by that name in his account of Caracalla's campaign. Lawrence Okamura, Matthias Springer, and Helmut Castritius have all argued against it, while Bleckmann, Hummer and other scholars have defended the widespread acceptance of the idea that Dio mentioned them. Most recently, Becker compared the Constantinian excerpts with those portions of Dio for which the original text survives. He found that the excerpts preserve the order of Dio's narrative and provide no parallel for the interpolation of new ethnic names. He therefore considers it very likely that the forms Ἀλαμβαννοί and Ἀλβανοί derive from Dio himself, and argues that they can plausibly represent scribal variants of Ἀλαμαννοί or Alamanni.

A further possible third-century attestation is preserved by the sixth-century historian Agathias, who attributes to the mid-third-century writer Asinius Quadratus a description of the Alemanni as a mixed people, but once again some modern scholars consider this uncertain because it is only reported in a much later source.

== Caracalla's campaign of 213 ==
The surviving evidence indicates that Caracalla conducted a Germania campaign beyond the Upper German–Raetian frontier in 213. Contemporary records show that on 11 August he was preparing to cross the frontier of Raetia into territory beyond the empire. The precise route of the campaign is uncertain, but later tradition places at least some of the fighting near the Main. Aurelius Victor, writing around 360, states that Caracalla defeated the Alamanni, "near the river Main". This has often been used to locate the campaign in the Main region, although it does not by itself show that the Alemanni were permanently settled there.

The surviving Dio tradition contains several anecdotes about Caracalla's dealings with Germanic groups during the campaign. In one passage he is described as intervening among them, ordering forts and settlements to be established and changing place names. In another, he summoned men of military age on the pretext of recruiting them as mercenaries and then had them surrounded and killed. A further passage reports that people identified in the transmitted text as Alemanni claimed to have caused an illness of Caracalla by magical means, while the emperor attempted to counter them by invoking ancestral spirits.

== Invasions of Italy, 250–280 ==
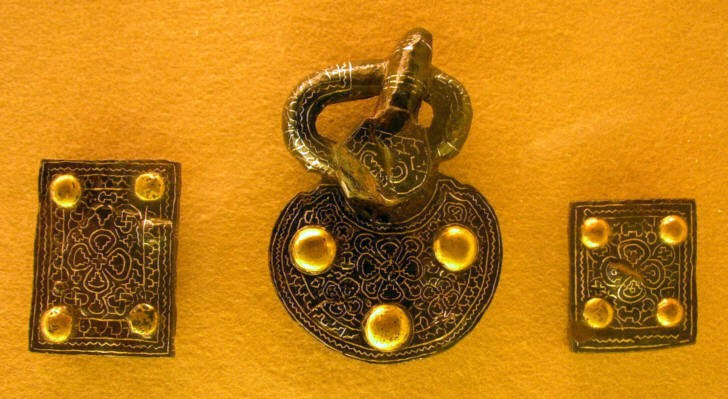
Alemannic belt mountings, from a seventh-century grave in the grave field at Weingarten

Centuries later, the sixth-century writer Gregory of Tours described an Alemannic king named Chrocus who invaded Gaul during the reigns of Valerian (reigned 253–260) and Gallienus (reigned 253–268), causing widespread destruction before his capture and execution at Arles. Modern scholars have sometimes connected this account with the invasions of 259–260, known from other sources, but this connection is uncertain.

More securely, Roman-era chronicles (still written well after the events) describe Germanic incursions into Italy in 260, and some refer to them as Alemanni. Prosper of Aquitaine and the Chronica Gallica of 511 state that Alamanni crossed into Italy after devastating Gaul, while Eutropius and Orosius call the invaders more generally Germani. This may be related to a 260 Roman victory altar erected near Augsburg, which records the defeat of a group described as the Semnones sive Iouthungi. Scholars have interpreted the word sive in different ways, with some seeing it as expressing doubt about the identity of the invaders, and others reading it as "Semnones, or — more precisely — Juthungi".

In 268, Claudius II (reigned 268–270) defeated another Germanic force near Lake Garda, at the Battle of Lake Benacus. The much later Epitome de Caesaribus calls these invaders Alemanni, although there is no contemporary source identifying them by that name. A group of these invaders was subsequently defeated by Gallienus at the Battle of Mediolanum near Milan.

In 269, the Historia Augusta also attributes to the short-lived emperor Marius a speech referring to omnis Alamannia omnisque Germania, "all Alamannia and all Germania". Because the work was composed much later and frequently projects later terminology and circumstances into the third century, this is not considered secure evidence that the regional name Alamannia was already in use in 269.

In 270 or, more probably, 271, another invasion of northern Italy led to a defeat of Aurelian (reigned 270–275) at the Battle of Placentia, followed by Roman victories at the Battle of Fano (Fanum Fortunae) and Battle of Pavia (Ticinum). The ancient sources use different names for the invaders. The only contemporary source, the Greek historian Dexippus, calls them Juthungi, while Zosimus later called them Alemanni. The Historia Augusta, an exceptionally problematic late-antique source containing numerous anachronisms and fabrications, instead calls them Marcomanni.

== Tetrarchy period, 289–305 ==
The first secure contemporary mention of the Alemanni under that name occurs in a Latin panegyric delivered at Trier in 289 for Maximian (reigned 286–305). The panegyrist clearly states that the Burgundiones et Alemanni had invaded Gaul together in 287 with a very large force, but that their numbers contributed to famine among them, which allowed Maximian to defeat them.

The Burgundians were previously unknown in this area, but mentioned by Ptolemy as living near the Vistula in the second century. A further panegyric delivered in 291 shows that relations between the Burgundians and Alemanni had changed, but also seems to suggest that the Burgundians had recently suffered defeat in the east. It states that the Burgundians had occupied Alemannic farmland (Burgundiones Alamannorum agros occupauere), which the Alemanni were attempting to recover. The same passage also refers to a Burgundian defeat by the eastern European Goths, and says that the Alemanni "again armed themselves for/as the defeated" (rursumque pro victis armantur Alemanni), a difficult phrase whose precise historical meaning is uncertain. In later records Roman historians such as Ammianus report the Burgundians living east of the Alemanni in an area which included old Roman border forts.

In 297/298 a panegyric for Constantius Chlorus (Caesar 293–305) referred to the devastation of Alamannia, apparently the earliest definite surviving contemporary use of that territorial name. Between 298 and 302 Constantius won major victories over the Alemanni, including the Battle of Lingones near modern Langres and the Battle of Vindonissa near modern Windisch.

== Constantine and Alamannia, 306–337 ==
After Constantius Chlorus died at York in July 306, his son Constantine (reigned 306–337) was proclaimed emperor by the troops there. According to the late fourth-century Epitome de Caesaribus, one of those who played a particularly important role in his elevation was Chrocus, described as a king of the Alemanni who had accompanied Constantius as an auxiliary. Scholars note that the name Chrocus also appeared in the account of Gregory of Tours, as the name of an Allemanic king decades earlier, in about 260. However, it is uncertain whether this represents the same person.

Under Constantine, Roman pressure on the Rhine continued. Panegyrics delivered in his reign describe campaigns against barbarian groups beyond the Rhine and explicitly include the Alemanni among his enemies. After a campaign in 313 Constantine celebrated another victory over the Rhine barbarians at Trier.

At about the same time, Alamannia also appeared in imperial propaganda as a territorial designation. Gold coins struck at Trier between 310 and 313 show a mourning female personification labelled ALAMANNIA beneath the legend GAVDIVM ROMANORVM, "joy of the Romans".

== Alemanni and the Constantinian dynasty, 337–363 ==
After Constantine's death in 337, inscriptions continue to give his son Constantine II the victory title Alamannicus, although these may simply repeat an earlier title rather than record a new campaign.

During the civil war between Magnentius and Constantius II in 350–353, Frankish and Alemannic groups again crossed the Rhine frontier while Roman forces were occupied by the internal conflict. The surviving sources disagree over whether this resulted primarily from Magnentius' withdrawal of frontier troops or from a deliberate attempt by Constantius to use Germanic allies against his rival.

From the middle of the fourth century the evidence for the Alemanni becomes much more detailed, above all through the contemporary historian Ammianus Marcellinus, who was himself in Gaul between 353 and 357. His account does not describe a single centralized Alemannic kingdom, but numerous kings and peoples which could make war or peace with Rome separately. Ammianus uses varying terms such as gens, populus, pagus and pars to describe different peoples or divisions of the Alemanni, some of which had their own kings and policies. Among the groups he associates with the Alemanni are the Bucinobantes, Lentienses and Juthungi. Other groups known from fourth-century sources include the Brisigavi and Raetovarii.

In 354 Constantius II (reigned 337–361) campaigned successfully against Alemanni near Augst and concluded peace with the Breisgau kings Gundomadus and Vadomarius. In 355 he defeated the Lentienses near Lake Constance. Germanic attacks nevertheless continued, and later that year Constantius appointed his cousin Julian as Caesar and sent him to restore Roman control in Gaul.

In 356 Julian assembled his army at Reims and marched eastwards. During the march an Alemannic force ambushed the two legions forming the Roman rear guard and nearly destroyed them before Roman reinforcements arrived. This episode is sometimes referred to as the Battle of Reims. Julian subsequently recovered several Roman positions along the Rhine.

In 357 a large coalition of Alemannic rulers under Chnodomarius and Serapio confronted Julian at the Battle of Strasbourg. Ammianus names seven kings in the coalition, together with subordinate regales and other leading men. The Alemanni were defeated and Chnodomarius was captured. The scale of the battle has sometimes been emphasized in modern accounts, although the ancient figures for the size of the armies and casualties are probably exaggerated.

Julian continued campaigning east of the Rhine in 357–359 and concluded separate agreements with several Alemannic kings. In 358 he forced Suomarius and Hortarius to submit and return Roman prisoners. In 359 he made treaties with Macrianus, Hariobaudes, Vadomarius, Urius, Ursicinus and Vestralpus. In 360/361 he accused Vadomarius of encouraging attacks on Raetia, captured him, and imposed another peace settlement.

== Conflicts under Valentinian and Gratian, 364–378 ==
Relations deteriorated again after Valentinian I became emperor in 364. In 365–366 Alemannic groups penetrated deeply into Gaul. The Roman commander Charietto was killed in January 366, but in the following months Jovinus defeated the invaders near Châlons.

In 368 repeated raids led Valentinian to cross the Rhine and campaign against the Alemanni in a difficult engagement conventionally known as the Battle of Solicinium. During the same period the Alemannic ruler Rando took advantage of the absence of Roman troops to raid Mainz. Valentinian subsequently strengthened the Rhine frontier with new fortifications. These works themselves caused further conflict when Roman construction extended into territory claimed by Alemannic groups.

In 370/371 the Romans attacked the Lentienses from Raetia, while Burgundians, acting in cooperation with Valentinian, advanced from the east through Alemannic territory. Valentinian also attempted to remove the Bucinobantian king Macrianus, but eventually concluded a treaty with him in 374.

In 378 the Lentienses, led by their king Priarius, invaded Roman territory and were defeated at the Battle of Argentovaria by an army commanded by Nannienus and Mallobaudes. Priarius was killed, and the emperor Gratian (reigned 367–383) pursued the survivors across the Rhine before concluding a treaty under which fighting men were taken into Roman service. Gratian's involvement in this campaign delayed his movement east to support Valens against the Goths before the Battle of Adrianople later that year.

== End of the Western Roman Empire, 378–496 ==
After the massive Roman defeat at Adrianople in 378, large numbers of Goths, Alans and Huns from the east moved into the Middle and Lower Danubian regions, many settling within the empire itself.

In about 406, contemporary and near-contemporary sources describe Suebi, Vandals and Alans making an eventful crossing of the Rhine into Gaul, most of whom probably departed from the Middle Danubian. While the sixth-century Gregory of Tours later identified these Suebi as Alemanni, modern scholars generally treat this as anachronistic, and caused by the later merging of the names Suebi and Alemanni. Alemanni and Burgundians from near the Rhine nevertheless appear to have expanded westwards across the Rhine during this period in the early fifth century.

In 411 Alemannic and Frankish troops served in the army of Constans, son of the usurper Constantine III. According to Sozomen, troops had been recruited from peoples living beyond the Rhine.

In 430 the Juthungi, who had earlier been associated with the Alemanni, raided Raetia but were defeated by forces of Aetius. This is the last surviving record in which they appear as a distinct people.

In 443 Aetius resettled the Burgundians, who had settled in Roman territory around Mainz and Worms, in the region of Geneva. This allowed the Alemanni to extend further across the Rhine. By 454, Sidonius Apollinaris referred to Alemanni who had extended their power to the western bank of the Rhine.

In 457 another Alemannic group crossed the Alps into northern Italy, where it was defeated by forces of the emperor Majorian. The principal source, Sidonius Apollinaris, celebrates the episode as a major imperial success, although modern scholars caution that the attackers may have been only a relatively small raiding force.

Around 469–470, Jordanes reports that a group of Danubian Suebi moved westwards and became associated with the Alemanni. He describes Suebi and Alemanni as allied against the Ostrogoths, while still treating them as distinct peoples.

In the 470s an Alemannic ruler named Gibuld is mentioned in the Vita Sancti Severini of Eugippius. Near Passau, he agreed with Severinus of Noricum to release Roman captives held by the Alemanni. A roughly contemporary hagiographical tradition, the Vita Lupi episcopi Trecensis, similarly describes an Alemannic ruler named Gebavultus negotiating with Lupus of Troyes over prisoners. Because of the similarity of the names and circumstances, some scholars have identified these two men. Alternatively, it has been suggested by some scholars that the Vita Lupi tradition itself may have been borrowed from the Vita Severini, but there is no consensus.

== Subjugation by the Franks ==
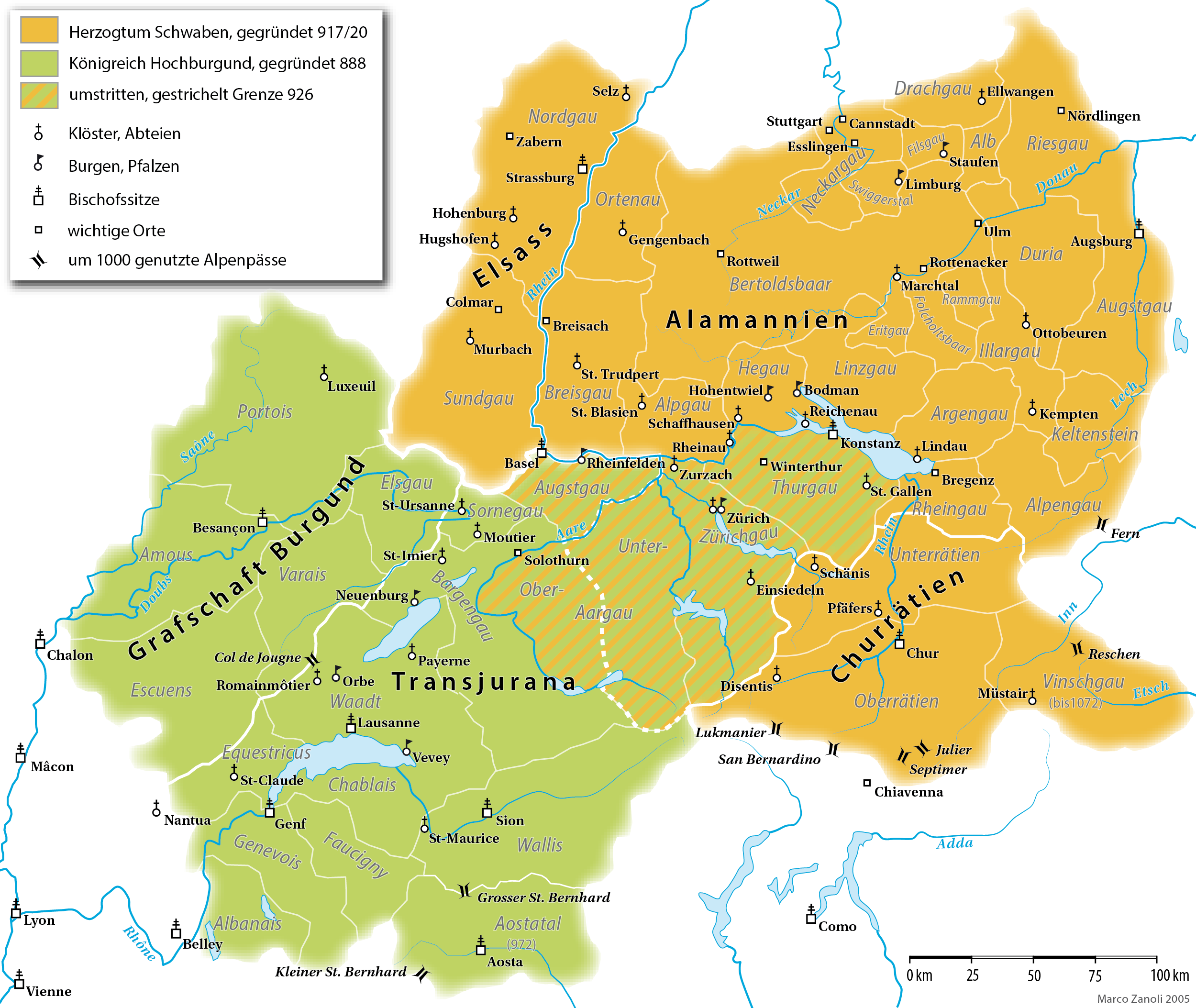
Alemannia (yellow) and Upper Burgundy (green) around 1000

The kingdom of Alamannia between Strasbourg and Augsburg lasted until 496, when the Alemanni were conquered by Clovis I at the Battle of Tolbiac. The war of Clovis with the Alemanni forms the setting for the conversion of Clovis, briefly treated by Gregory of Tours. (Book II.31) After their defeat in 496, the Alemanni bucked the Frankish yoke and put themselves under the protection of Theodoric the Great of the Ostrogoths but after his death they were again subjugated by the Franks under Theudebert I in 536. Subsequently, the Alemanni formed part of the Frankish dominions and were governed by a Frankish duke.

In 554, at the Battle of the Volturnus; Byzantine General Narses defeated a combined force of Franks and Alemanni in southern Italy.

Until the 8th century, Frankish suzerainty over Alemannia was mostly nominal. However, in 746 after an uprising by Theudebald, the Duke of Alamannia, Carloman executed the Alamannic nobility at the blood court at Cannstatt, and for the following century, Alemannia was ruled by Frankish dukes.

As the Carolingian Empire weakened, the Alemannic counts became almost independent, and a struggle for supremacy took place between them and the Bishopric of Constance. Following the treaty of Verdun of 843 Alemannia became a province of the eastern kingdom of Louis the German, the precursor of the Holy Roman Empire. The chief family in Alamannia was that of the counts of Raetia Curiensis, who were sometimes called margraves, and one of them, Burchard II, established the Duchy of Swabia, which was recognized by Henry the Fowler in 919 AD and became a stem duchy of the Holy Roman Empire. The duchy persisted until 1268.

== Culture ==
=== Language ===
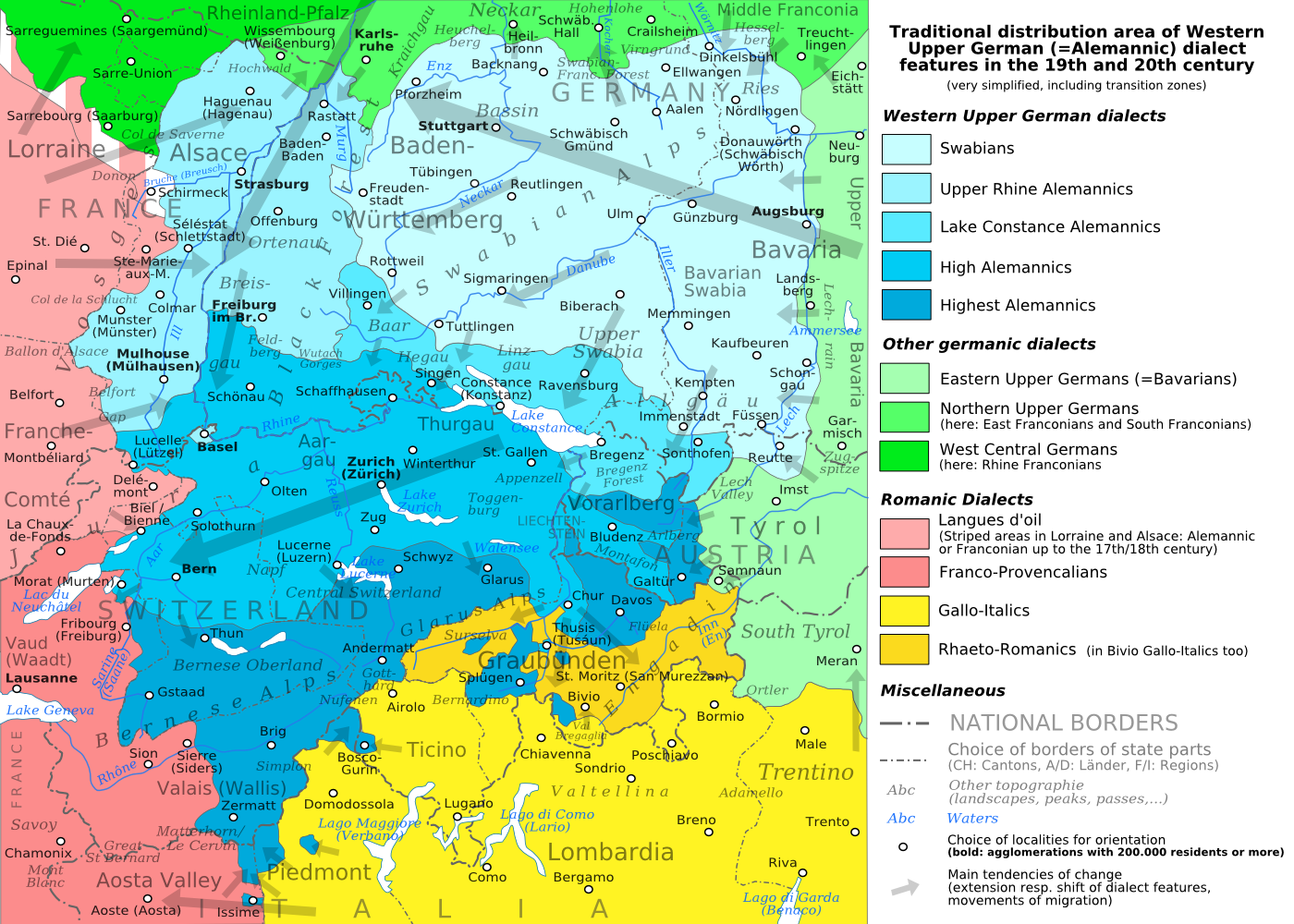
The traditional distribution area of Western Upper German (Alemannic) dialect features in the 19th and 20th centuries

The German spoken today over the range of the former Alemanni is termed Alemannic German, and is recognised among the subgroups of the High German languages. Alemannic runic inscriptions such as those on the Pforzen buckle are among the earliest testimonies of Old High German. The High German consonant shift is thought to have originated around the fifth century either in Alemannia or among the Lombards; before that, the dialect spoken by Alemannic tribes was little different from that of other West Germanic peoples.

Alemannia lost its distinct jurisdictional identity when Charles Martel absorbed it into the Frankish empire, early in the eighth century. Today, Alemannic is a linguistic term, referring to Alemannic German, encompassing the dialects of the southern two-thirds of Baden-Württemberg (German state), in western Bavaria (German state), in Vorarlberg (Austrian state), Swiss German in Switzerland and the Alsatian dialect of the Alsace (France).

=== Political organization ===
The Alemanni established a series of territorially defined pagi (cantons) on the east bank of the Rhine. The exact number and extent of these pagi is unclear and probably changed over time.

Pagi, usually pairs of pagi combined, formed kingdoms (regna) which, it is generally believed, were permanent and hereditary. Ammianus describes Alemanni rulers with various terms: reges excelsiores ante alios ("paramount kings"), reges proximi ("neighbouring kings"), reguli ("petty kings") and regales ("princes"). This may be a formal hierarchy, or they may be vague, overlapping terms, or a combination of both. In 357, there appear to have been two paramount kings (Chnodomar and Westralp) who probably acted as presidents of the confederation and seven other kings (reges). Their territories were small and mostly strung along the Rhine (although a few were in the hinterland). It is possible that the reguli were the rulers of the two pagi in each kingdom. Underneath the royal class were the nobles (called optimates by the Romans) and warriors (called armati by the Romans). The warriors consisted of professional warbands and levies of free men. Each nobleman could raise an average of c. 50 warriors.

=== Religion ===
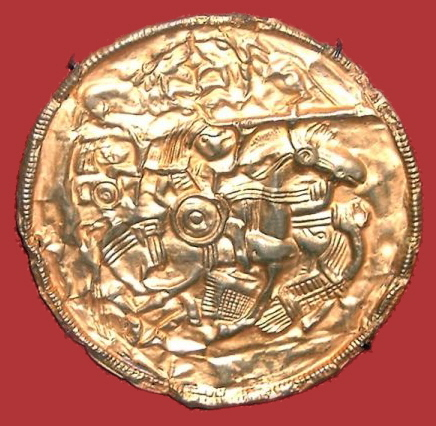
The gold bracteate of Pliezhausen (sixth or seventh century) shows typical iconography of the pagan period. The bracteate depicts the "horse-stabber underhoof" scene, a supine warrior stabbing a horse while it runs over him. The scene is adapted from Roman era gravestones of the region.

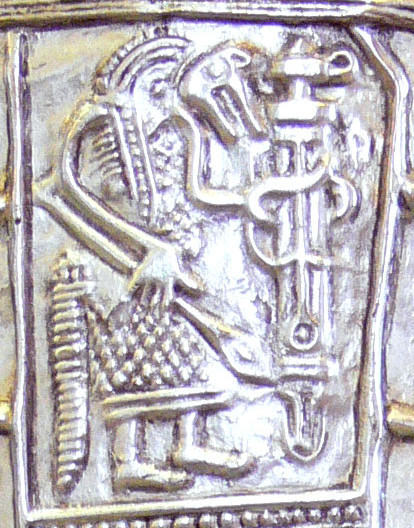
The seventh-century Gutenstein scabbard, found near Sigmaringen, Baden-Württemberg, is a late testimony of pagan ritual in Alemannia, showing a warrior in ritual wolf costume, holding a ring-spatha.

The Christianization of the Alemanni took place during Merovingian times (sixth to eighth centuries). We know that in the sixth century, the Alemanni were predominantly pagan, and in the eighth century, they were predominantly Christian. The intervening seventh century was a period of genuine syncretism during which Christian symbolism and doctrine gradually grew in influence.

Some scholars have speculated that members of the Alemannic elite such as king Gibuld due to Visigothic influence may have been converted to Arianism even in the later fifth century.

In the mid-6th century, the Byzantine historian Agathias records, in the context of the wars of the Goths and Franks against Byzantium, that the Alemanni fighting among the troops of Frankish king Theudebald were like the Franks in all respects except religion, since

they worship certain trees, the waters of rivers, hills and mountain valleys, in whose honour they sacrifice horses, cattle and countless other animals by beheading them, and imagine that they are performing an act of piety thereby.

He also spoke of the particular ruthlessness of the Alemanni in destroying Christian sanctuaries and plundering churches while the genuine Franks were respectful towards those sanctuaries. Agathias expresses his hope that the Alemanni would assume better manners through prolonged contact with the Franks, which is by all appearances, in a manner of speaking, what eventually happened.

Apostles of the Alemanni were Columbanus and his disciple Saint Gall. Jonas of Bobbio records that Columbanus was active in Bregenz, where he disrupted a beer sacrifice to Wodan. Despite these activities, for some time, the Alemanni seem to have continued their pagan cult activities, with only superficial or syncretistic Christian elements. In particular, there was no change in burial practice, and tumulus warrior graves continued to be erected throughout Merovingian times. Syncretism of traditional Germanic animal style with Christian symbolism is also present in artwork, but Christian symbolism became more and more prevalent during the seventh century. Unlike the later Christianization of the Saxons and of the Slavs, the Alemanni seem to have adopted Christianity gradually, and voluntarily, spread in emulation of the Merovingian elite.

From c. the 520s to the 620s, there was a surge of Alemannic Elder Futhark inscriptions. About 70 specimens have survived, roughly half of them on fibulae, others on belt buckles (see Pforzen buckle, Bülach fibula) and other jewellery and weapon parts. The use of runes subsides with the advance of Christianity. The Nordendorf fibula (early seventh century) clearly records pagan theonyms, logaþorewodanwigiþonar read as "Wodan and Donar are magicians/sorcerers", but this may be interpreted as either a pagan invocation of the powers of these deities, or a Christian protective charm against them. A runic inscription on a fibula found at Bad Ems reflects Christian pious sentiment (and is also explicitly marked with a Christian cross), reading god fura dih deofile ᛭ ("God for/before you, Theophilus!", or alternatively "God before you, Devil!"). Dated to between AD 660 and 690, it marks the end of the native Alemannic tradition of runic literacy. Bad Ems is in Rhineland-Palatinate, on the northwestern boundary of Alemannic settlement, where Frankish influence would have been strongest.

The establishment of the bishopric of Konstanz cannot be dated exactly and was possibly undertaken by Columbanus himself (before 612). In any case, it existed by 635, when Gunzo appointed John of Grab bishop. Constance was a missionary bishopric in newly converted lands, and did not look back on late Roman church history unlike the Raetian bishopric of Chur (established 451) and Basel (an episcopal seat from 740, and which continued the line of Bishops of Augusta Raurica, see Bishop of Basel). The establishment of the church as an institution recognized by worldly rulers is also visible in legal history. In the early seventh century Pactus Alamannorum hardly ever mentions the special privileges of the church, while Lantfrid's Lex Alamannorum of 720 has an entire chapter reserved for ecclesial matters alone.

== Genetics ==
A genetic study published in Science Advances in September 2018 examined the remains of 13 individuals buried at a seventh-century Alemannic graveyard in Niederstotzingen, Germany, and concluded that the community there in the late 6th and early 7th century was based around a local family, but also contained people who had moved from other regions. Based on archaeological evidence the gravesite was probably used for about two generations, from about 580 to 630 AD. Five of the individuals were closely related men, who probably grew up locally, based on their strontium and oxygen isotypes. This group had a genetic profile resembling modern northern and eastern European populations, and all had the Y haplogroup R1b-U106. At least four of them were buried with grave goods. Two individuals buried at the cemetery were found to be genetically different from both the others and each other, displaying genetic links to Southern Europe, and one of these probably grew up in a higher altitude area.

According to Gretzinger et al. (2024), the early medieval Alemannic and Bavarian populations of southern Germany had considerably more steppe-related ancestry and, consequently, significantly less Early European Farmer (EEF) ancestry than the pre-Roman Iron Age Hallstatt population, which they saw as being consistent with "the arrival of Germanic-speaking tribes from northern Germany or Denmark". The data indicates a significant increase in Scandinavian-related ancestry—a proxy for Germanic-speaking groups—in the first half of the first millennium AD, with "median northern European ancestry" rising significantly, reaching high levels in the early medieval period. This population turnover was associated with the introduction of new paternal haplogroups, such as I1-M253, which is commonly found in "Continental North European-like ancestry". These Alemannic and Bavarian populations of Late Antiquity and the Early Middle Ages were genetically indistinguishable from Iron Age and Medieval groups in Northern Germany and Scandinavia, and showed the closest resemblance to present-day populations from Denmark, northern Germany, the Netherlands, and Scandinavia.

== See also ==
- Annales Alamannici
- List of rulers of Alamannia
- List of confederations of Germanic tribes
- Armalausi
- Varisci
- Helvetii
- Charietto

== Sources ==
- Anton, Hans (1981), "Burgunden II. Historisches § 4-7", in Beck, Heinrich; Geuenich, Dieter; Steuer, Heiko (eds.), Reallexikon der Germanischen Altertumskunde, vol. 4 (2 ed.), De Gruyter, pp. 235–248, ISBN 978-3-11-006513-8
- Becker, Armin (2026). "Die Alamannen bei Cassius Dio". In Matijević, Krešimir; Wiegels, Rainer (eds.). Maximinus Thrax in seiner Zeit (PDF). Göttingen: Göttingen University Press. pp. 287–306. doi:10.17875/gup2026-3058.
- Bleckmann, Bruno (2002). "Die Alamannen im 3. Jahrhundert: Althistorische Bemerkungen zur Ersterwähnung und zur Ethnogenese". Museum Helveticum. 59: 145–171.
- Drinkwater, John F. (2007). The Alamanni and Rome 213–496. Caracalla to Clovis. Oxford: Oxford University Press. ISBN 978-0-19-929568-5.
- Geuenich, Dieter (2000), "Juthungen § 2. Historisches", in Beck, Heinrich; Geuenich, Dieter; Steuer, Heiko (eds.), Reallexikon der Germanischen Altertumskunde, vol. 16 (2 ed.), De Gruyter, pp. 141–142, ISBN 978-3-11-016782-5
- Geuenich, Dieter (2023). "Alemannen. I. Sprachliches & II. Geschichtliches". Germanische Altertumskunde Online. De Gruyter.
- Haubrichs, Wolfgang (2002). "Nomen gentis. Die Volksbezeichnung der Alamannen". In Jaehrling, Jürgen; Meves, Uwe; Timm, Erika (eds.). Röllwagenbüchlein: Festschrift für Walter Röll zum 65. Geburtstag. Berlin/New York: Max Niemeyer Verlag. pp. 19–42. doi:10.1515/9783110911916. ISBN 978-3-484-10845-5.
- Hummer, Hans J. (1998). "The fluidity of barbarian identity: the ethnogenesis of Alemanni and Suebi, AD 200–500". Early Medieval Europe. 7 (1): 1–27.
- Jänichen, Hans (1973). "Alemannen. II. Geschichtliches". Reallexikon der Germanischen Altertumskunde. Vol. 1 (2 ed.). De Gruyter. pp. 138–142.
- Kuhn, Hans (1973). "Alemannen. I. Sprachliches". Reallexikon der Germanischen Altertumskunde. Vol. 1 (2 ed.). De Gruyter. pp. 137–138.
- Liccardo, Salvatore (2023), Old Names, New Peoples: Listing Ethnonyms in Late Antiquity, Brill, doi:10.1163/9789004686601, ISBN 978-90-04-68660-1
- Nixon, C E V; Rodgers, Barbara Saylor (1994). In praise of later Roman emperors: the Panegyrici Latini. Berkeley: University of California Press. ISBN 0-520-08326-1.
- Nuber, Hans Ulrich (1984). "Decumates agri. §§ 2–6". Reallexikon der Germanischen Altertumskunde. Vol. 5 (2 ed.). De Gruyter. pp. 273–286.
- O'Sullivan, Niall; et al. (September 5, 2018). "Ancient genome-wide analyses infer kinship structure in an Early Medieval Alemannic graveyard". Science Advances. 4 (9) eaao1262. American Association for the Advancement of Science. Bibcode:2018SciA....4.1262O. doi:10.1126/sciadv.aao1262. PMC 6124919. PMID 30191172.
- Rübekeil, Ludwig (2004). "Was verrät der Name der Alamannen über ihr Ethnos?". In Naumann, Hans-Peter (ed.). Alemannien und der Norden: Internationales Symposium vom 18.–20. Oktober 2001 in Zürich. Ergänzungsbände zum Reallexikon der Germanischen Altertumskunde. Vol. 43. Berlin/New York: De Gruyter. pp. 114–141. ISBN 978-3-11-017891-3.
- Runde, Ingo (1998). "Die Franken und Alemannen vor 500. Ein chronologischer Überblick". In Geuenich, Dieter (ed.). Die Franken und die Alemannen bis zur "Schlacht bei Zülpich" (496/97). Reallexikon der Germanischen Altertumskunde – Ergänzungsbände. Vol. 19. De Gruyter. ISBN 978-3-11-015826-7.
- Springer, Matthias; Castritius, Helmut (2008). "Wurde der Name der Alemannen doch schon 213 erwähnt?". In Ludwig, Uwe; Schilp, Thomas (eds.). Nomen et Fraternitas: Festschrift für Dieter Geuenich zum 65. Geburtstag. Reallexikon der Germanischen Altertumskunde – Ergänzungsbände. Vol. 62. De Gruyter. pp. 431–448. ISBN 978-3-11-020238-0.
- Steuer, Heiko (1973). "Alemannen. III. Archäologisches". Reallexikon der Germanischen Altertumskunde. Vol. 1 (2 ed.). De Gruyter. pp. 142–163.
- Steuer, Heiko (2021). „Germanen“ aus Sicht der Archäologie: Neue Thesen zu einem alten Thema. De Gruyter. doi:10.1515/9783110702675. ISBN 978-3-11-070267-5.
- Steuer, Heiko (2023). "Alemannen. III. Archäologisches". Germanische Altertumskunde Online. De Gruyter.
- Witschel, Christian (2020). "Germanische Einfälle in die Provinzen an Rhein und oberer Donau im 3. Jh. n. Chr.: Die Problematik der epigraphischen, numismatischen und archäologischen Zeugnisse". In Mitthof, Fritz; Martin, Gunther; Grusková, Jana (eds.). Empire in Crisis: Gothic Invasions and Roman Historiography. Tyche Supplementband. Vol. 12. Wien: Verlag Holzhausen. pp. 423–530. ISBN 978-3-903207-38-7.
- Ian Wood (ed.), Franks and Alamanni in the Merovingian Period: An Ethnographic Perspective (Studies in Historical Archaeoethnology), Boydell & Brewer Ltd, 2003, ISBN 1-84383-035-3.

=== Primary sources ===
- Ammianus Marcellinus, passim
- Dio Cassius lxvii. ff.
- Melchior Goldast, Rerum Alamannicarum scriptores (1606, 2nd ed. Senckenburg 1730)
- Gregory of Tours, Historia Francorum, book ii.

=== Old modern works ===
- C. Zeuss, Die Deutschen und die Nachbarstämme (Munich, 1837), pp. 303 ff.
- O. Bremer in H. Paul, Grundriss der germanischen Philologie (2nd ed., Strassburg, 1900), vol. iii. pp. 930 ff.
