= Willehari =

Willehari or Willihari (Latin: Vilarius, Wilharius, Willeharius, or Willicharius) was an Alemannic duke (dux) in the Ortenau in the early eighth century.

According to the Vita Sancti Desiderii, Pepin of Heristal of the Franks, led two expeditions against Willehari in 709 and 712. It is unknown why Pepin intervened in Alemannia at this time, but it is likely that he was trying to affirm Frankish suzerainty by upholding the rights of succession of Lantfrid and Theudebald, the sons of the late duke Gotfrid, whom Willehari may have been elected to replace. It is possible that Alemannia was not united at this time and that several different regions were ruled separately by different families. Alsace, for one, was definitely ruled by another family, the Etichonids, and elsewhere it is likely that the Ahalolfings were in power.

== Sources ==
- Geuenich, Dieter. Geschichte der Alemannen. Kohlhammer Verlag: Stuttgart, 2004. ISBN 3-17-018227-7
