= Etichonids =

Germanic noble family

Etichonid dynasty
- Country: Francia; East Francia; Holy Roman Empire
- Founded: 7th century
- Founder: Eticho
- Final ruler: Gertrude of Dagsburg
- Dissolution: 1225

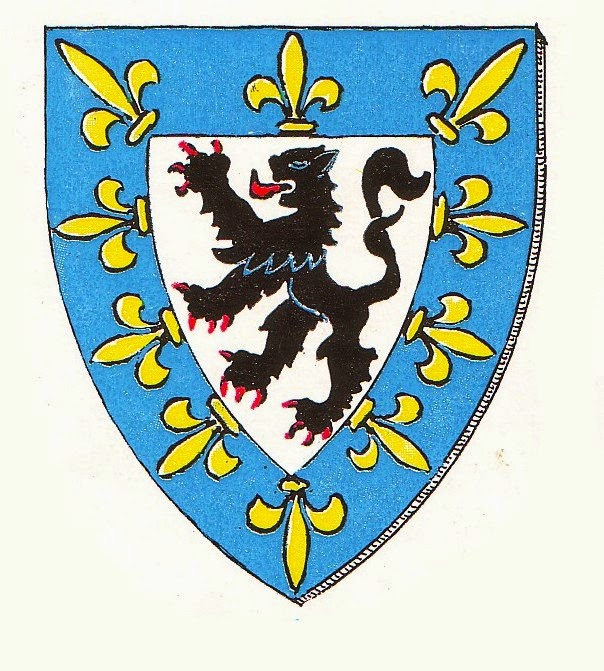
Coat of arms of the Etichonids as Counts of Egisheim

The Etichonids were an important noble family, probably of Frankish–Burgundian origin, who ruled the Duchy of Alsace in the Early Middle Ages (7th–10th centuries). The dynasty is named for Eticho (also known as Aldarich), who ruled from 673 to 690.

The earliest accounts record the family's beginnings in the pagus Attoariensis around Dijon in northern Burgundy. In the mid-7th century a duke of the region named Amalgar and his wife Aquilina are noticed as major founders and patrons of monasteries. King Dagobert I and his father made donations to them to recover their loyalty and compensate them for the losses that they had sustained as supporters of Queen Brunhild and her grandson, Sigebert II. Amalgar and his wife founded a convent at Brégille and an abbey at Bèze, installing a son and daughter in the abbacies. They were succeeded by their third child, Adalrich, who was the father of Adalrich, Duke of Alsace. This second Adalrich was the first to secure the ducal title. His name, Eticho, a variation of Adalrich, is used by modern scholars as the name of the family.

Under the Etichonids, Alsace was generally divided into a northern and a southern county, Nordgau and Sundgau. These counties, as well as the monasteries of the duchy, were brought under tighter control of the dukes with the rise of the Etichonids. There exists scholarly debate concerning whether or not the Etichonids were in conflict or alliance with the Carolingians, but it is possible that they were both: opponents of the extension of Charles Martel's authority in the 720s when he first made war on Alemannia, but allies when the Alemanni, under Duke Theudebald invaded Alsace (which had a large Alemannic element in its population) in the early 740s. The last Etichonid duke, Liutfrid, may have died fighting Theudebald on behalf of Pepin the Short with his son, Hilfrid.

Among the descendants of the Etichonids, in the female line were Hugh of Tours and his family, including his daughter Ermengard, who was wife to Lothair I and thus mother to three Carolingian kings. In the 10th century, the Etichonids remained powerful in Alsace as counts, but their power was circumscribed significantly by the Ottonians; by the 11th century, Pope Leo IX seemed unaware that his ancestors, the lords (or counts) of Dagsburg and Egisheim for the previous half century were in fact the direct descendants of the last Etichonids. All notable European families trace their lineage to the Etichonids.

== Etichonid dukes and counts in Alsace ==
(Note: Here the numbering of the counts is the same for all states, as all were titled Counts of Alsace, despite the different parts of land and its particular numbering of the rulers.)

Ruler	Born	Reign	Death	Ruling part	Consort	Notes
Eticho I Adalric	635	662–690	20 February 690	Alsace	Berswinde c.655 six children	Founder of the family and first count of Nordgau.
Adalbert I	665	690–722	722	Alsace	Gerlinde of Pfalzel six children Berlinde two children	Also duke of Alsace.
Eberhard I	?	722–747	747	Sundgau	? one child	Son of Adalbert I, retained Sundgau, the southern part of Alsace.
Eticho II	700	722–723	723	Nordgau	Unknown two children	Son of Adalric, retained Nordgau, the northern part of Alsace.
Alberic I	?	723–747	747	Nordgau	Unknown four children	Son of Eticho II.
Liutfrid I	700	747–767	767	Sundgau	Hiltrude two children	Son of Adalbert I.
Rhutard I	?	747–765	765	Nordgau	Hirmisende no children	Son of Liutfrid I, probably a usurper. Left no descendants. Nordgau passed to the Alberic's heir, Eberhard.
Eberhard II	?	765–777	777	Nordgau	Unknown one child	Son of Alberic I.
Liutfrid II	745	767–769; 770–802	802	Sundgau	Hiltrude of Wormsgau four children	Son of Liutfrid I.
Garin	?	c.769	769?	Sundgau	Unknown	Probably usurpers, as they don't seem to have family connections with the Etichonids.
Pirathlion	?	c.770	770?	Sundgau	Unknown	Probably usurpers, as they don't seem to have family connections with the Etichonids.
Udalric	?	778–804	804?	Nordgau	Unknown	Probably usurpers, as they don't seem to have family connections with the Etichonids.
Ruthelin	?	805–c.810?	before 817?	Nordgau	Unknown	Probably usurpers, as they don't seem to have family connections with the Etichonids.
Erchangaire	?	c.810?–817	817?	Nordgau	Unknown	Probably usurpers, as they don't seem to have family connections with the Etichonids.
Wuorand	?	817	817?	Nordgau	Unknown	Probably usurpers, as they don't seem to have family connections with the Etichonids.
Hugh I	c.760	802–837	20 October 837	Sundgau	Ava of Morvois four children	Son of Liutfrid II.
Eberhard III	?	817–864	864	Nordgau	Unknown one child	Son of Eberhard II.
Liutfrid III	?	837–864	864	Sundgau	Unknown three children	Son of Hugh I.
Adalbert II	?	864–898	898	Nordgau	Unknown	Probably usurper.
Hugh II	?	864–880	880	Sundgau	Unknown no children	Son of Liutfrid III, left no descendants. He was succeeded by his brother Liutfrid.
Liutfrid IV	?	880–910	910	Sundgau	Unknown one child	Son of Liutfrid III.
Eberhard IV	840	898–910	910	Nordgau	Adelinda two children	Son of Eberhard III.
Liutfrid V	?	910–938	938	Sundgau	Unknown one child	Son of Liutfrid IV.
Hugh III	?	910–940	940	Nordgau	Adelinda two children	Brother of Eberhard IV. Also known as Hugo III.
Guntram the Rich	c.920	938–954	20 March 973	Sundgau	Unknown one child	Son of Hugh III, ruled Sundgau for a period, before returning it to the heir of Liutfrid V. Guntram was grandfather of Radbot, Count of Habsburg, founder of the House of Habsburg.
Hugh IV	?	940–959	959	Nordgau	Unknown	Also known as Hugo IV.
Liutfrid VI	?	954–977	977	Sundgau	Unknown one child	Son or brother of Liutfrid V.
Eberhard V	?	959–973	18 December 973	Nordgau	Liutgarde of Lotharingia one child	Son of Hugh III.
Hugh V Raucus	?	973–986	986	Nordgau	Unknown	Son of Eberhard IV.
Liutfrid VII	?	977–c.1003	c.1003?	Sundgau	Unknown one child	Son of Liutfrid VI. Left no descendants. The county seemed to have returned to non-hereditary rulership, by members of nobility with apparently no relation with the Etichonids.: c. 1003: Otto I; c. 1027: Giselbert; c. 1048: Berengar; c. 1052: Kuno; c. 1063: Rudolph; c. 1084: Henry; Then Sundgau might have been given to the Habsburgs.
Eberhard VI	?	986–1016	1016	Nordgau	Bertha no children	Left no descendants.
Hugh VI	c.970	1000–1016	1048	Eguisheim–Dagsburg	Heilwig of Dagsburg eight children	Acquired Eguisheim, and by marriage added Dagsburg to his patrimony. Among his children was Bruno of Eguisheim-Dagsburg. After his brother's death in 1016, he was the heir to Nordgau, which became annexed to Eguisheim.
Hugh VI	c.970	1016–c.1030?	1048	Eguisheim–Dagsburg–Nordgau	Heilwig of Dagsburg eight children	Acquired Eguisheim, and by marriage added Dagsburg to his patrimony. Among his children was Bruno of Eguisheim-Dagsburg. After his brother's death in 1016, he was the heir to Nordgau, which became annexed to Eguisheim.
Hugh VI	c.970	c.10301038	1048	Nordgau	Heilwig of Dagsburg eight children	Acquired Eguisheim, and by marriage added Dagsburg to his patrimony. Among his children was Bruno of Eguisheim-Dagsburg. After his brother's death in 1016, he was the heir to Nordgau, which became annexed to Eguisheim.
Hugh VI	c.970	1038–1046	1048	Eguisheim–Nordgau	Heilwig of Dagsburg eight children	Acquired Eguisheim, and by marriage added Dagsburg to his patrimony. Among his children was Bruno of Eguisheim-Dagsburg. After his brother's death in 1016, he was the heir to Nordgau, which became annexed to Eguisheim.
Gerhard I	?	c.1030?–1038	1038	Eguisheim	Petronice of Lorraine no children	Left no descendants. Eguisheim reverted to his brother.
Hugh VII	?	c.1030?–1046	18 November 1049	Dagsburg	Mathilde d'Eename two children	Inherited Dagsburg, and after his brother's death, reunited it with Eguisheim.
Hugh VII	?	1046–1049	18 November 1049	Eguisheim–Dagsburg–Nordgau	Mathilde d'Eename two children	Inherited Dagsburg, and after his brother's death, reunited it with Eguisheim.
Henry I	?	1049–1065	28 June c.1065	Eguisheim–Dagsburg–Nordgau	Unknown c.1040 four children	
Gerhard II	?	1065	c.1100?	Nordgau	Richarda four children	
Gerhard II	?	1098–c.1100?	c.1100?	Eguisheim	Richarda four children	
Hugh VIII	?	1065–1089	5 September 1089	Dagsburg–Nordgau	Mathilde of Montbéliard no children	Inherits Dagsburg and Nordgau. He was dispossessed of Nordgau by Henry IV, Holy Roman Emperor, during the Investiture Controversy, and killed in the attempt of its recover. On his death with no descendants, his brother inherited only Dagsburg.
Albert I	?	1065-1089	24 August 1098	Eguisheim	Hedwig one son Ermesinde of Luxembourg; 1096; Longwy two children	
Albert I	?	1089–1098	24 August 1098	Dagsburg–Eguisheim	Hedwig one son Ermesinde of Luxembourg; 1096; Longwy two children	
Hugh IX	?	1098–1137	1137	Dagsburg	Gertrude of Loon three children	Also known as Henry Hugh.
Hedwig	?	c.1100?–1126	1126	Eguisheim	Gerard I, Count of Vaudémont; 1080 four children	After her death Eguisheim passed to Vaudémont line of the House of Lorraine.
Hugh X	?	1137–1175	1175	Dagsburg	Lutgarde of Sulzbach after 1142 four children	Also known as Henry Hugh.
Albert II	?	1175–1212	1212	Dagsburg	Gertrude of Baden; 1180 three children	Also count of Moha.
Gertrude	c.1190	1212–1225	1225	Dagsburg	Theobald I, Duke of Lorraine; 1215 no children Theobald I of Navarre; 1217 (annulled 1223) no children Simon of Leiningen; 1224 no children	With no heirs, after her death Dagsburg passed to the Leiningen family.

== See also ==
Genealogy of the Etichonid agnates

== Sources ==
- Hummer, Hans J. Politics and Power in Early Medieval Europe: Alsace and the Frankish Realm 600–1000. Cambridge University Press: 2005. See mainly pp 46–55.
