= Hugh IV of Nordgau =

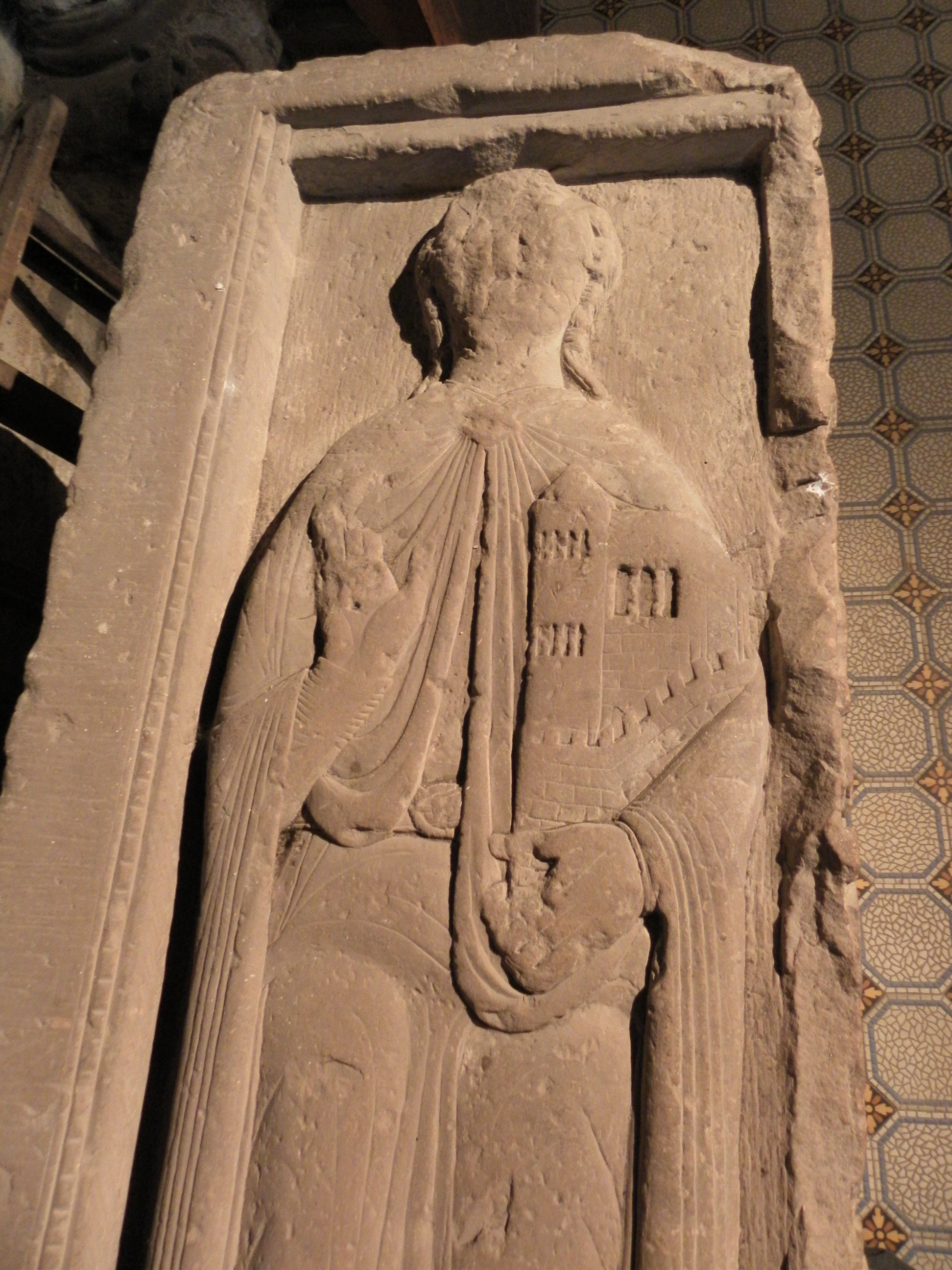
Gisant of Hugh IV of Nordgau (or perhaps his son Henry)

Hugh IV of Nordgau (970 – 1048) was Count of Nordgau, Egisheim and Dagsburg. He and his wife patronized numerous abbeys and monasteries. His son, Bruno, became Pope Leo IX in 1048.

== Biography ==
Hugh was the son of Hugh II of Nordgau. According to Nicolas Viton of Saint-Allais, he succeeded, in 1027, his nephew Eberhard VI, who had died childless. In the same year Ernest II, Duke of Swabia, rebelled against his stepfather, the Salic emperor Conrad II, and Hugh's lands and castles in Alsace were devastated and plundered, before he was forced to surrender and was imprisoned.

Hugh founded the Abbey of Hesse, to honour Blessed Bishop Martin, near Sarrebourg, whose privileges were confirmed by his son, Pope Leo IX in 1050. In Altdorf, Hugh had a monastery dedicated to the martyr Cyriacus. He also founded the Abbey of Woffenheim, while his wife, Hedwig of Dabo, founded the Abbey of Notre-Dame d'Oelenberg near Reiningue.

Hugh died in 1048, while his wife had died two years earlier, in 1046.

== Marriage and children ==
Hugh married Hedwig of Dagsburg, daughter and heiress of Louis, Count of Dagsburg. They had:

- Gerard, count of Egisheim, killed in battle in 1038; married Kuniza (or Pétronice) of Lorraine;
- Matilda, who married Richwin, count of Scarpone; they had Louis of Montbéliard;
- Hugh, Count of Dachsbourg, who predeceased his father; married Matilde d'Eename
- Bruno, canon and then bishop of Toul (1026), who became pope Leo IX (1049)
- Adelaide, who married Adalbert of Calw, count of Ufgau
- Gertrude, who married Liudolf, Margrave of Frisia
- Hedwig, who married Otto II, Duke of Swabia;
- Geppa, abbess of Nuitz or Neuss (North Rhine-Westphalia) in Germany, near Düsseldorf.

== Sources ==
- Jakobs, Hermann (1968). Der Adel in der Klosterreform von St. Blasien (in German). Köln: Böhlau.
- Robinson, I.S., ed. (2004). The Papal Reform of the Eleventh Century: Lives of Pope Leo IX and Pope Gregory VII. Manchester University Press.
- Vanderputten, Steven (2018). Dark Age Nunneries: The Ambiguous Identity of Female Monasticism, 800–1050. Cornell University Press.
