= County of Dagsburg =

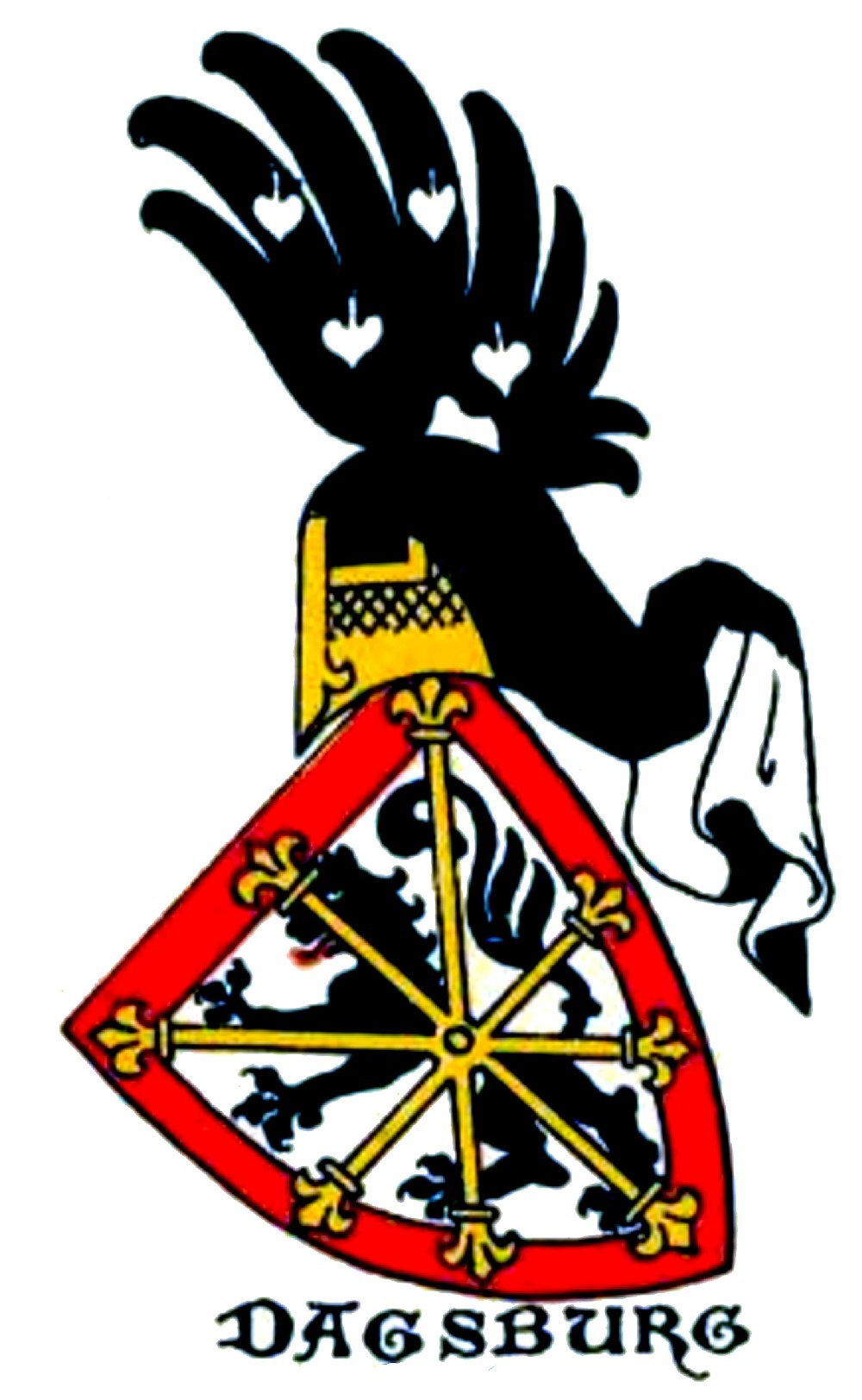
Coat of arms of the Counts of Dagsburg

The County of Dagsburg with its capital Dagsburg (now Dabo in France) existed in Lorraine from 11th to 18th centuries when the area was still part of Holy Roman Empire.

== History ==
The ancestral castle in Dabo, the Dagsburg Castle in Lorraine, was acquired by the Etichonids shortly before the year 1000 through the marriage of Hugo VI, Count of Nordgau and Count of Eguisheim, with Heilwig of Dagsburg (d. 1046).

The Etichonids built another Dagsburg Castle in Upper Alsace in 1150. The male members of the family used the title of Count of Dagsburg and Count of Eguisheim at this time; later they added the County of Metz. Among their possessions were numerous manors in the upper Saar area, Moha and Waleffe and High justice in the Diocese of Metz.

The Etichonids died out in 1225. Gertrude of Dagsburg, the last member of the family, left behind eleven castles (including the Château de Guirbaden) and the vogtei over nine monasteries. The possessions around Dabo fell to the House of Leiningen in 1241.

Another part of the inheritance went to the House of Zähringen, who at times left some of their rights to the Archbishopric of Strasbourg, with whom they had territorial disputes. The Bishop of Metz decided that the fiefs of Moha and Waleffe had fallen vacant, and gave them to the Prince-Bishop of Liège.

A branch called Leiningen-Dagsburg existed within the House of Leiningen from 1317 to 1797.

== References and sources ==
- Gerhard Köbler: Historisches Lexikon der deutschen Länder, 1992
- Detlev Schwennicke: Europäische Stammtafeln, vol. I.2, 1999, table 200b
