= Husseren-les-Châteaux =

Commune in Grand Est, France

- Commune
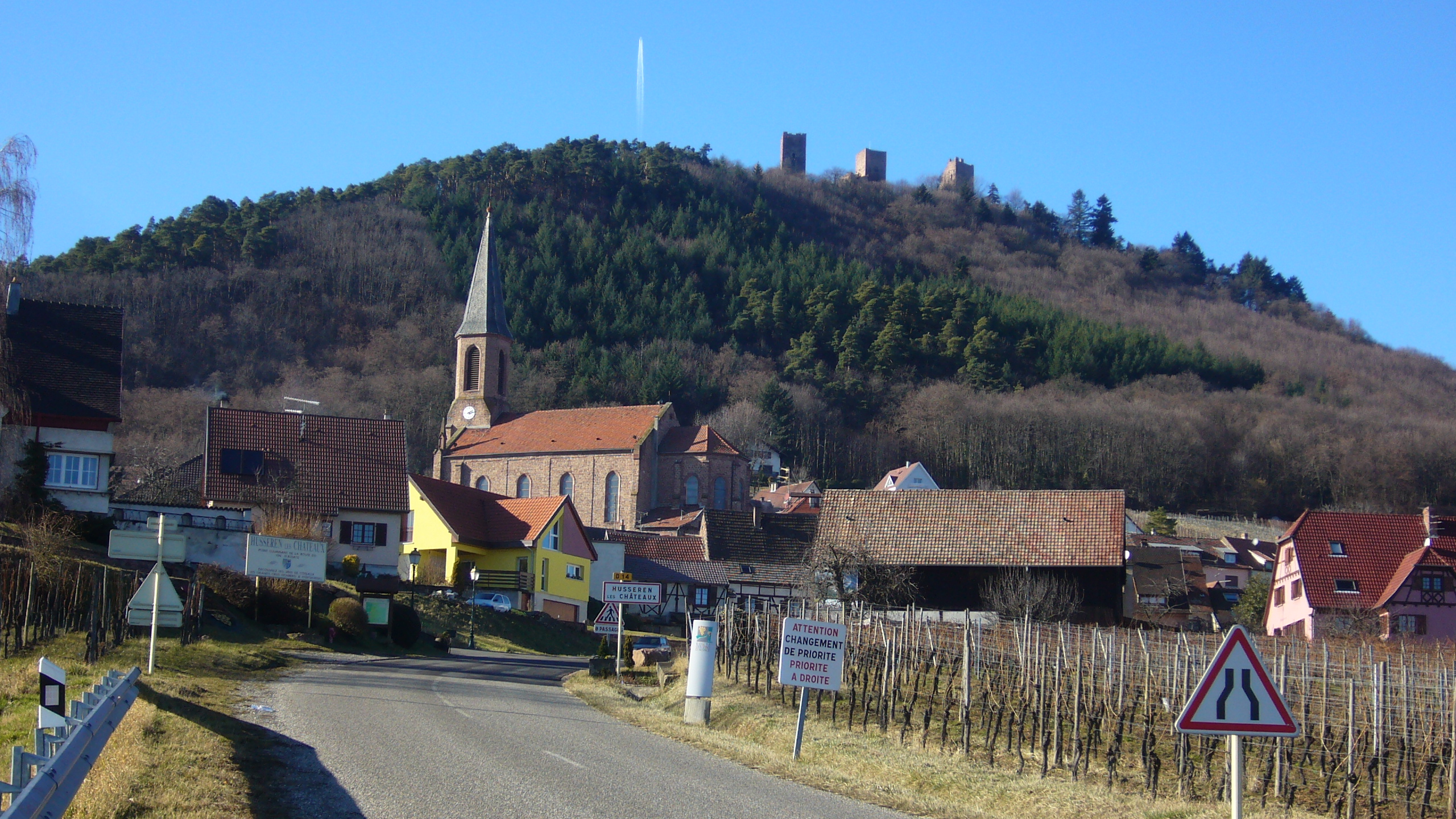
- The road into Husseren-les-Châteaux

- Coat of arms
- Location of Husseren-les-Châteaux
- Location within France Location within Grand Est
- Coordinates: 48°02′08″N 7°16′54″E
- Country: France
- Region: Grand Est
- Department: Haut-Rhin
- Arrondissement: Colmar-Ribeauvillé
- Canton: Wintzenheim

Government
  - Mayor (2020–2026): Édouard Leiber
- Area^{1}: 1.2 km^{2} (0.46 sq mi)
- Elevation: 380 m (1,250 ft)
- Highest elevation: 595 m (1,952 ft)
- Lowest elevation: 320 m (1,050 ft)
- Population (2023): 502
  - Density: 420/km^{2} (1,100/sq mi)
- Time zone: UTC+01:00 (CET)
  - Summer (DST): UTC+02:00 (CEST)
- INSEE/Postal code: 68150 /68420
- ^{1} French Land Register data, which excludes lakes, ponds, glaciers > 1 km^{2} (0.386 sq mi or 247 acres) and river estuaries.

Husseren-les-Châteaux (German: Häusern) is a commune in the Haut-Rhin department in Grand Est in north-eastern France. The village lies on the edge of the Ballons des Vosges Nature Park, where the Vosges meet the Upper Rhine Plain.

The village is overlooked by the ruins of three castles which stand in close proximity to each other: Dagsbourg, Wahlenbourg and Weckmund. They are known locally as Les Trois Châteaux. Although the ruins can be reached by car they are a popular hiking destination.

This village is one of the many villages along 'La Route des Vins d'Alsace', close to Eguisheim and is in the middle of vineyards.

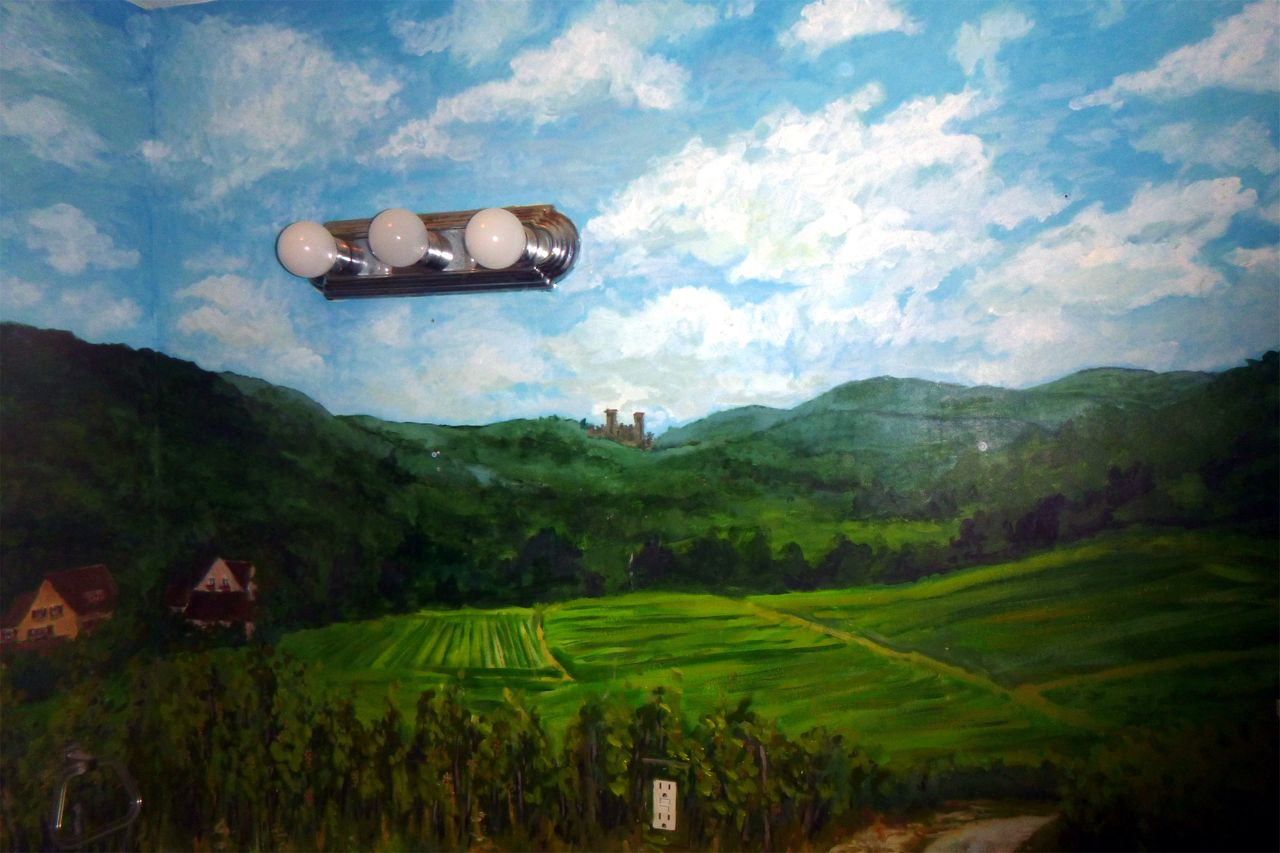
Michelle Heffley painting of a vineyard of Domaine Bruno Schueller (formerly Domaine Gerard Schueller) in Hesseren-les-Châteaux (Alsace)

The village is connected to Eguisheim by the Route du Vin (D14).

== See also ==
- Communes of the Haut-Rhin department
