= Theudebald, Duke of Alamannia =

8th-century Alamanni ruler

Theudebald or Theutbald was the Duke of Alamannia from 730 until his deposition. He was a son of Gotfrid and brother and co-ruler with Lantfrid from 709.

In 727, Theudebald expelled Pirmin, the founder of Reichenau Abbey, out of a hatred for Charles Martel (ob odium Karoli), whose influence in Alamannia he detested. During a military campaign in 730, Lantfrid was killed and Theudebald became sole duke. In 732, Theudebald was chased out of Alemannia by Charles Martel, but upon Charles' death in 741 he returned to claim his dukedom.

In 742, Theudebald rebelled against the nominal authority of the Merovingian monarchy which was then being exercised by the two mayors of the palace Pepin the Short and Carloman; the Basques, Bavarii, and Saxons all revolted simultaneously. That same year Theudebald invaded the Duchy of Alsace, then ruled by Duke Liutfrid. The Alsatian duke was probably killed alongside his son fighting for the mayors. In 744, Pepin invaded the Swabian Jura and chased Theudebald from his mountain redoubt. He was defeated in Alsace by Pepin's select band of warriors. In 745, Carloman had to march on the duke again, this time defeating him and executing many at the blood court of Cannstatt. Alamannia was subjected once and for all. Its subsequent history was much affected by the violence with which its ducal independence was snuffed out.

== Sources ==
- Reuter, Timothy. Germany in the Early Middle Ages 800–1056. New York: Longman, 1991.
- Hummer, Hans J. Politics and Power in Early Medieval Europe: Alsace and the Frankish Realm 600 – 1000. Cambridge University Press: 2005.
- Bachrach, Bernard S. Merovingian Military Organization, 481–751. Minneapolis: University of Minnesota Press, 1971.
- Alemanni.

Preceded by Gotfrid; Lantfrid	Duke of Alamannia ?–746	Succeeded by Carloman
