= Liutfrid, Duke of Alsace =

Liutfrid (died probably 742), also spelled Leodefred, Leudefred, or Leudefrid, was the Duke of Alsace, the third in a line of Etichonid dukes dating back to circa 670. He succeeded his father Adalbert in 723.

In the 720s he made his younger brother Eberhard count of the Sundgau. He made his court at Strasbourg, where he patronised the monastery of Weissenburg in seven separate donations between 734 and his death. Liutfrid was on good terms with the bishop of Strasbourg, Heddo, a partisan of Charles Martel.

Liutfrid probably supported Charles Martel in his wars with the Alemanni across the Rhine. He disappears from the records in 742, along with his son Hildfrid, and presumably they died fighting for the Carolingians, for their last charter is dated to the first year of the reign of Carloman, son of Charles Martel. No duke was appointed to succeed the heirless Liutfrid. He had two wives, probably both Alsatian: Hiltrudis (Hiltrude[e]) and Theutila.

== Sources ==
- Bouchard, Constance Brittain (2015). Rewriting Saints and Ancestors: Memory and Forgetting in France, 500-1200. University of Pennsylvania Press.
- Hummer, Hans J. (2005). Politics and Power in Early Medieval Europe: Alsace and the Frankish Realm, 600–1000. Cambridge: Cambridge University Press. ISBN 978-0-521-85441-2.
