= Lanfredus =

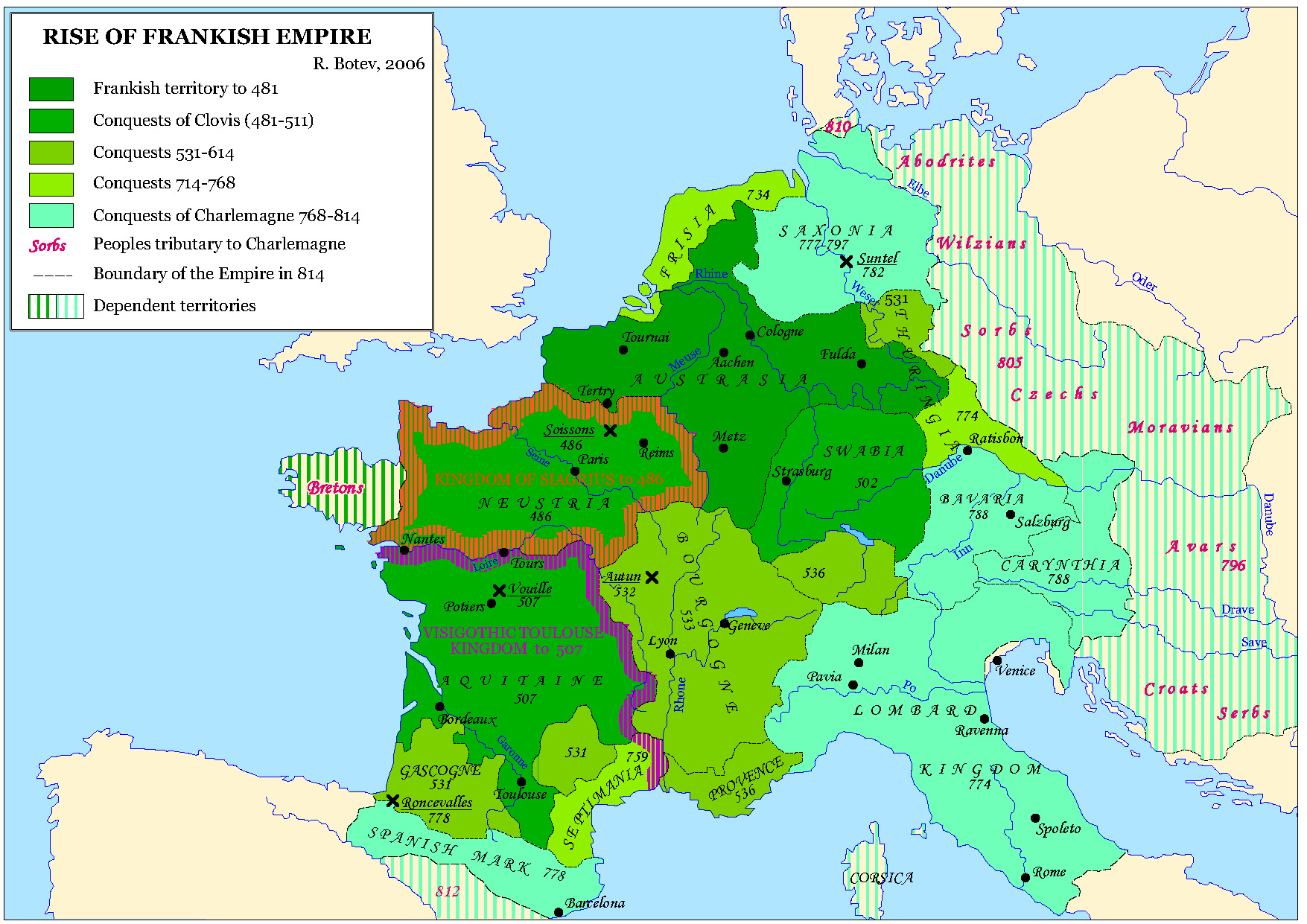
Expansion of Frankish rule (Alamannia rendered as Swabia)

Lanfredus (Latinised from Lantfrid or Lanfred) (died 730) was duke of Alamannia under Frankish sovereignty from 709 until his death. He was the son of duke Cotefredus. Lanfredus's brother was Theudebald.

Following Cotefredus's death in 709 and the accession of Lanfredus and his brother Theudebald, the Frankish maior domus Pepin of Herstal invaded Alamannia and fought against yet another duke, Willehari, whose territory was restricted to the Ortenau in western Alamannia. This campaign can be seen as an attempt by Pepin to impose royal authority on the duchy following the death of Cotefredus and also to assert his right to influence or even control the succession within the duchy. Pepin’s campaign against Willehari might therefore have taken place to assist Lanfredus and Theudebald in their claim to the duchy. However, both Lanfredus and Theudebald were hostile to Pepin’s successor.

After Pipin’s death in 714, Lanfredus dissolved all links with the royal court and its new maior domus Charles Martell.

Alamannic resistance against Frankish supremacy was tenacious. In 722 Charles Martel forcefully subdued the duchies of Alamannia and Bavaria but in the following year both duchies again rose against Carolingian supremacy.

In 724 Pirmin founded the Reichenau Abbey under the protection of Charles Martel, Lanfredus and Theudebald considered this a provocation and in 727 Theudebald ob odium Karoli ("out of hatred against Charles") evicted first Pirmin and, in 732, his successor Heddo from Reichenau. The Abbey of St. Gall, however, founded 719 by the Alamannic monk Otmar, was favoured by the dukes of Alamannia and the regional aristocracy.

Between 724 and 730 Lanfredus usurped the right to issue a law-code whereas up until then law-giving had been one of the major activities of the Merovingian kings. He instigated a revision of the Laws of the Alamans (Lex Alamannorum Lantfridus), a sign and an expression of his claim to be an independent ruler. Even though in the law-code the king is mentioned as dominus, there is no reference to the role of the maior domus, which is an indication of Lanfredus's loyalty towards the Merovingian dynasty.

In 730 Charles Martell invaded the duchy with an army once again. Lanfredus's death is recorded for the same year. Whether this occurred as a result of the fighting is not clear. His brother Theudebald succeeded to the duchy as sole ruler.

== Bibliography ==
- E. Ewig (2001). Die Merowinger und das Frankenreich. 4th ed., Kohlhammer Verlag: Köln. ISBN 3-17-017044-9.
- D. Geuenich (1997). Geschichte der Alemannen. Kohlhammer Verlag: Köln. ISBN 3-17-012095-6.
- R. Kaiser (1993). Das römische Erbe und das Merowingerreich. Oldenbourg: München. ISBN 3-486-53691-5.
- R. Schieffer (2000). Die Karolinger. 3rd ed., Kohlhammer Verlag: Köln. ISBN 3-17-016480-5.
- J. M. Wallace-Hadrill (1993). The Long-Haired Kings. Orig. publ. 1962, University of Toronto Press: Toronto. ISBN 0-8020-6500-7.
- I. Wood (1994). The Merovingian Kingdoms 450-751. Longman: Harlow. ISBN 0-582-49372-2.
