= Nordgau (Alsace) =

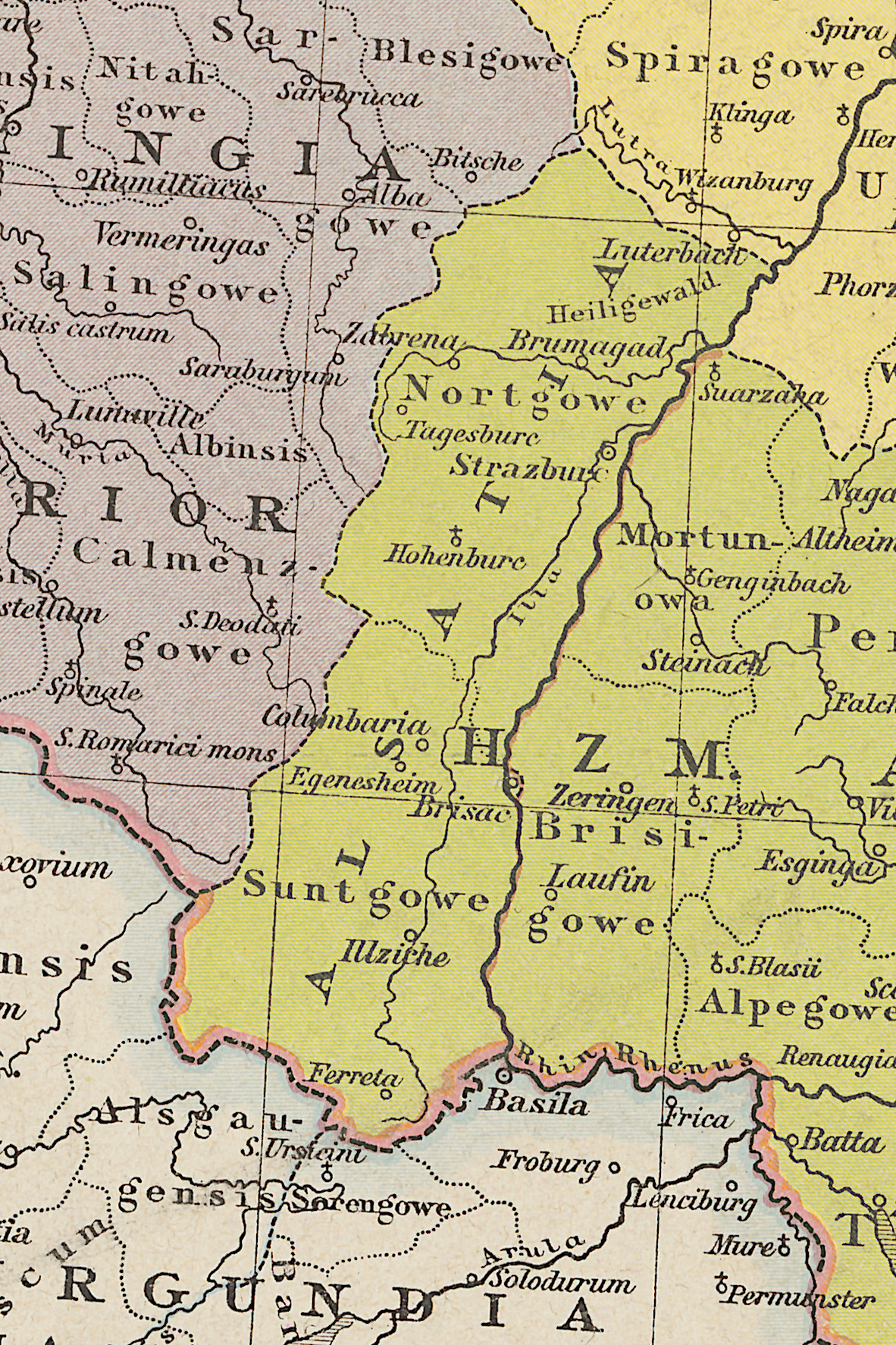

The Alsatian Nordgau was a medieval Gau in an area roughly comparable to the present-day French Bas-Rhin department.

== History ==
In the Middle Ages, what was then Alsace was divided into two districts, called Nordgau (“Nordgowe”, Unterelsass) and Südgau (“Suntgowe”, Sundgau, Oberelsass). The border roughly corresponded to that which was established in 297, when the Roman province of Germania Superior was divided into Maxima Sequanorum in the south and Germania Prima in the north.

The Alsatian Nordgau is to be distinguished from the Bavarian Nordgau, that existed at the same time.

From the 9th to the end of the 11th century, the Alsatian Nordgau was almost entirely in the hands of the Etichonids family. The family developed into the Counts of Egisheim and Dagsburg, whose possessions were however situated more in Upper Alsace.

The last Count was Hugues VII de Dabo who was dispossessed of Nordgau by Henry IV, Holy Roman Emperor, during the Investiture Controversy, and killed in 1089 in an attempt of its recover. The Nordgau was later largely merged into the Prince-Bishopric of Strasbourg, other parts came to the Habsburgs and the Décapole.

== See also ==
- Lower Alsace

== Sources ==
- Julius Cramer, Die Geschichte der Alamannen als Gaugeschichte - Siebentes Buch - Die neualamannischen Gaue des Elsass, M. & H. Marcus, Breslau, 1899, online Pag. 522-527
- Jean-Daniel Schoepflin, L'Alsace illustrée: ou recherches sur l'Alsace pendant la domination des Celtes, des Romains, des Francs, des Allemands et des Français Volume 3, François Perrin Libraire-Èditeur, Mulhouse, 1851, Online Pag. 269-271
- Charles Wastelain, Description de la Gaule-Belgique selon les trois ages de l'histoire, l'ancien, le moyen et le moderne, Cramé, Lille, 1761, Online Pag. 98-102
