= Illfurth =

Commune in Grand Est, France

- Commune
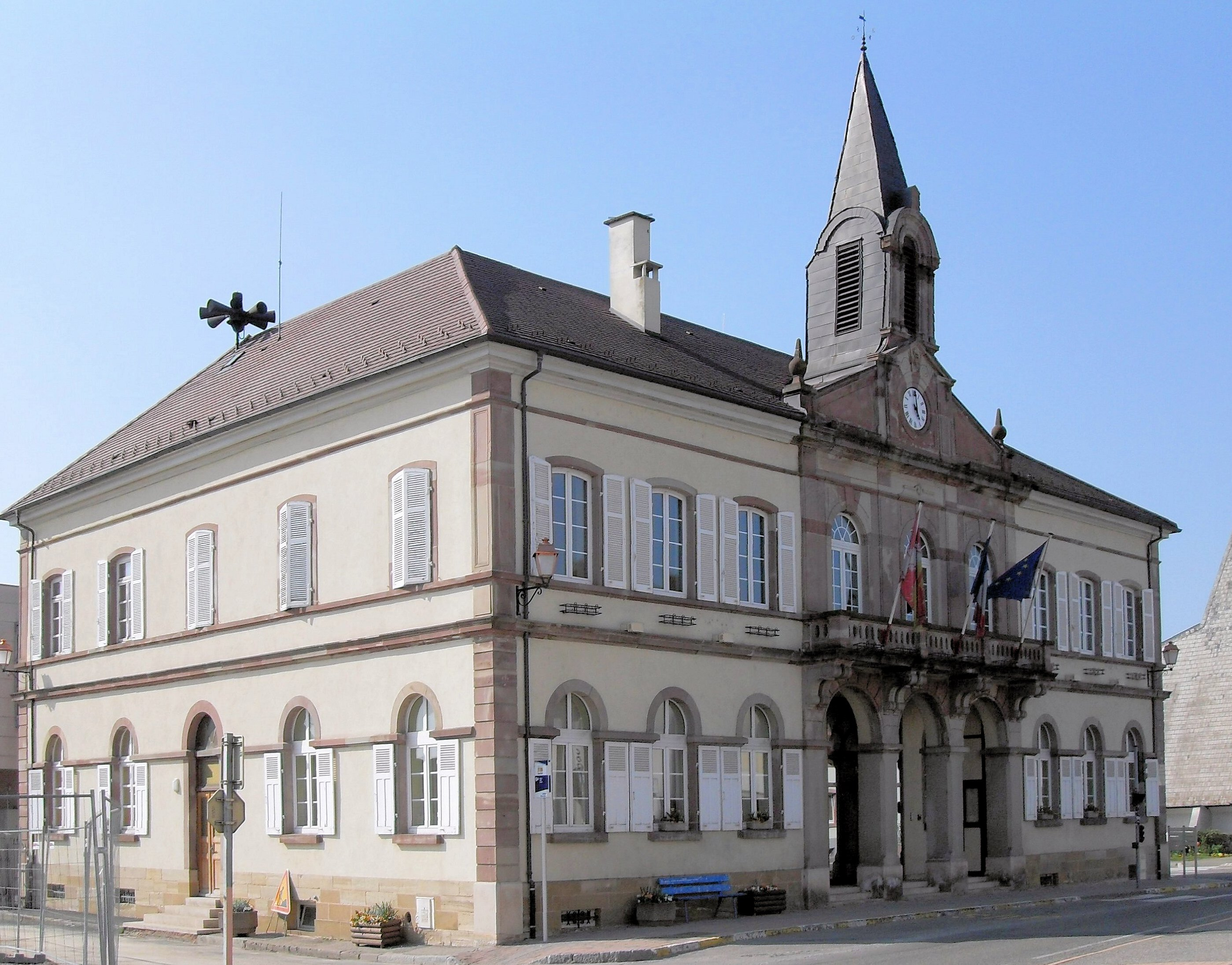
- The town hall in Illfurth

- Coat of arms
- Location of Illfurth
- Location within France Location within Grand Est
- Coordinates: 47°40′24″N 7°15′57″E
- Country: France
- Region: Grand Est
- Department: Haut-Rhin
- Arrondissement: Altkirch
- Canton: Altkirch

Government
  - Mayor (2020–2026): Christian Sutter
- Area^{1}: 9.16 km^{2} (3.54 sq mi)
- Elevation: 260 m (850 ft)
- Highest elevation: 391 m (1,283 ft)
- Lowest elevation: 255 m (837 ft)
- Population (2023): 2,445
  - Density: 267/km^{2} (691/sq mi)
- Time zone: UTC+01:00 (CET)
  - Summer (DST): UTC+02:00 (CEST)
- INSEE/Postal code: 68152 /68720
- ^{1} French Land Register data, which excludes lakes, ponds, glaciers > 1 km^{2} (0.386 sq mi or 247 acres) and river estuaries.

Illfurth (French pronunciation: [ilfyʁt]; German: Illfurt) is a commune in the Haut-Rhin department in Alsace in north-eastern France. It lies on the river Ill and the Rhône–Rhine Canal, southwest of Mulhouse.

== Population ==
Historical population
Year	Pop.	±% p.a.
1968	1,671	—
1975	1,721	+0.42%
1982	1,692	−0.24%
1990	1,828	+0.97%
1999	1,959	+0.77%
2007	2,282	+1.93%
2012	2,511	+1.93%
2017	2,474	−0.30%
2023	2,445	−0.20%
Source: INSEE

== See also ==
- Communes of the Haut-Rhin département
