= Naulette =

Cave and archaeological site in Belgium

Naulette Cave
- Caverne de la Naulette (French)
- Location in Belgium
- 50°12′50″N 4°55′51″E
- Periods: Palaeolithic
- Associated with: Neanderthals
- Location: near Dinant, Province of Namur
- Region: Wallonia, Belgium

Site notes
- Excavation dates: 1866,
- Archaeologists: Édouard Dupont

Naulette, French: Caverne de la Naulette is a large cave located in Wallonia on the left bank of the Lesse, a tributary of the Meuse in the hills above Dinant, Belgium.

In 1866 Belgian paleontologist Édouard Dupont discovered a fragmented edentulous human mandible and an incomplete ulna at Naulette, that are now housed in the Brussels Natural History Museum .

Contrary to earlier human fossil discoveries, such as the Neanderthal 1 remains in Germany, which could not be traced back to its contextual origin the Naulette fossil's antiquity was quickly confirmed as it was recorded in a precise stratigraphic context and could be compared and associated with remains of large, extinct prehistoric mammals, mammoth, rhinoceros and reindeer unearthed from the same sediment layer. French anthropologist Paul Broca wrote that the discovery constitutes "the first event providing Darwinists with anatomical evidence. It is the first link in the chain which, according to them, extends from man to the apes".

The mandible exhibits certain peculiarities, is of a very ape-like type in its extreme projection and that of the teeth sockets (the teeth themselves are lost), suggesting very strong canines and large molars that increase in size backward. The Naulette Man is now considered to be a Neanderthal assigned to the Mousterian culture.

== See also ==
- Caves of Han-sur-Lesse
