= Eguisheim =

Commune in Grand Est, France

- Commune
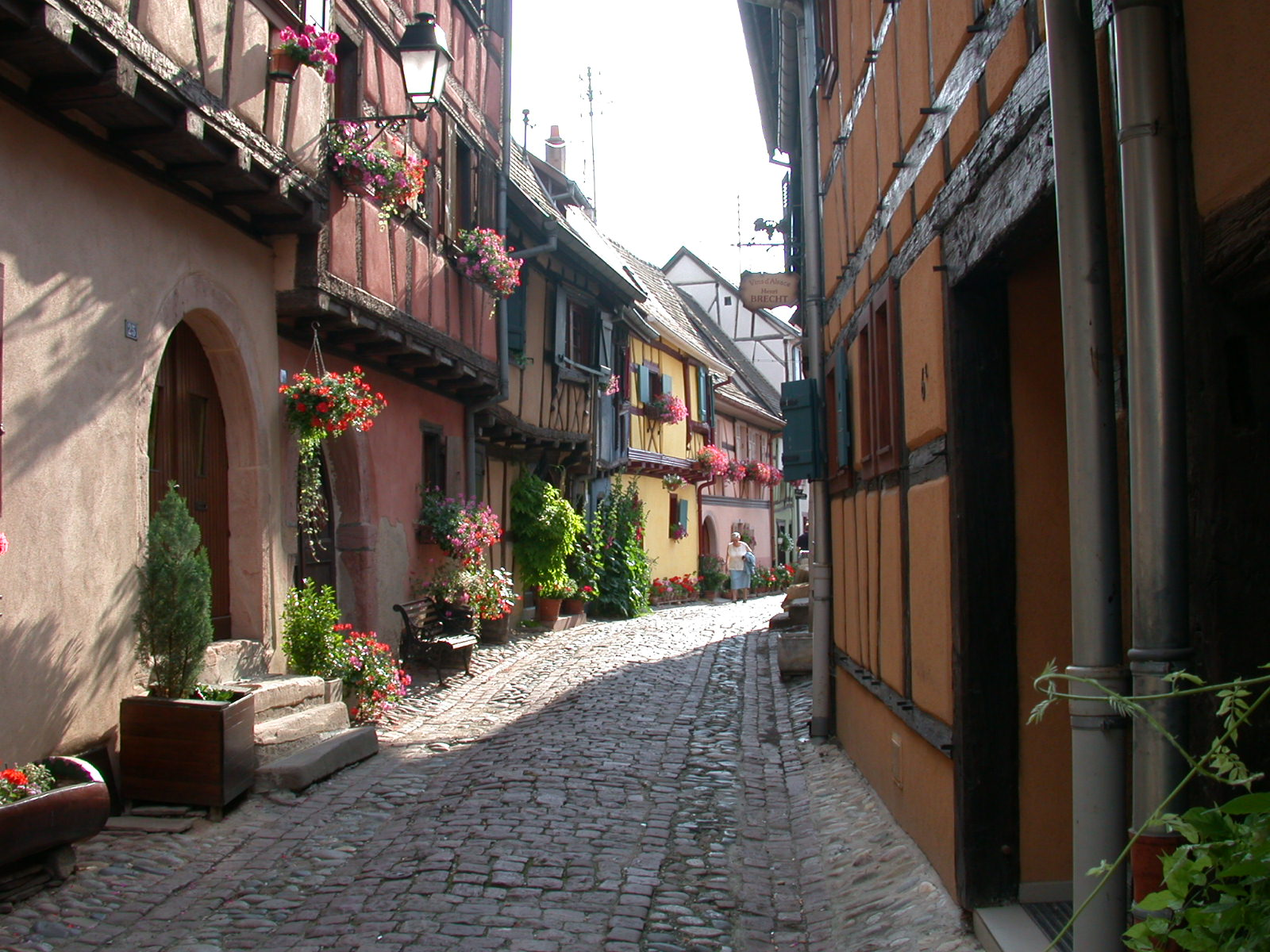
- Street in Eguisheim

- Coat of arms
- Location of Eguisheim
- Location within France Location within Grand Est
- Coordinates: 48°02′37″N 7°18′24″E
- Country: France
- Region: Grand Est
- Department: Haut-Rhin
- Arrondissement: Colmar-Ribeauvillé
- Canton: Wintzenheim

Government
  - Mayor (2020–2026): Claude Centlivre
- Area^{1}: 14.13 km^{2} (5.46 sq mi)
- Elevation: 210 m (690 ft)
- Highest elevation: 764 m (2,507 ft)
- Lowest elevation: 191 m (627 ft)
- Population (2023): 1,729
  - Density: 122.4/km^{2} (316.9/sq mi)
- Time zone: UTC+01:00 (CET)
  - Summer (DST): UTC+02:00 (CEST)
- INSEE/Postal code: 68078 /68420
- ^{1} French Land Register data, which excludes lakes, ponds, glaciers > 1 km^{2} (0.386 sq mi or 247 acres) and river estuaries.

Eguisheim (French: [egisaim]; German: Egisheim; Alsatian: Egsa) is a commune in the Haut-Rhin department in Grand Est in north-eastern France. It lies in the historical region of Alsace (German: Elsass). The village lies on the edge of the Ballons des Vosges Nature Park, where the Vosges meet the Upper Rhine Plain.

Eguisheim is about 7 kilometres (4 mi) from Colmar.

The vineyards around Eguisheim produce Alsace wine of high quality. The village is ranked in the top 20 of Les Plus Beaux Villages de France. In May 2013 it was voted the 'Village préféré des Français' (Favorite French Village), an annual distinction that passes from town to town throughout France.

== Toponymy ==
The ancient estate spanning the communes of Eguisheim and Husseren was likely named Exsa or Exa, leaving Alsatian variants like Agse or Egse—nicknames still used by locals today[20]. The term Die drei Hexe (literally “Three Witches” in German tinged with Alsatian dialect) refers to the three castles long in ruins on these communes. Though simplified as die drei egisheimer Schlösser (“the three Eguisheim castles”), the literal translation of Drei Hexe has fueled speculation among enthusiasts of infernal folklore. The Gallo-Roman name Exsa likely denotes a defensive withdrawal or fortification relative to a common Roman thoroughfare. This prefix characterizes the hills, mounts, and lands of the expansive, peripheral Gallo-Roman estate. Carolingian cartularies from around 770 CE refer to the estate as Aginesheim. Proponents of anthroponymic influence argue that the Germanic personal name Agino, Egeno, or Egino—common in ancient records and linked to a figure named Egino, a descendant of Duke Aldaric—combines with the suffix -heim. The latter derives from an old Germanic lexeme meaning “house” or “dwelling,” later extended to “village.” Another hypothesis posits that Exsina, a diminutive of Exsa, evolved into Agesina and later Agina, suggesting it was once an outlying hamlet of the estate. The suffix -heim commonly denotes a significant, often royal, domain—not only in Alsace but also in Swabia and across Germany. Slightly altered to -hem in Flemish, it appears in Belgium and Nord-Pas-de-Calais, and even in Britain as -ham. Its origin may also lie in Gaulish, with -heim being a Germanic adaptation. Combined with the Saxon genitive of dependency, this explains Aginasheim, later Eginesheim and finally Eguisheim. The evolution differs for Eginesberg, which morphed early into Egischberg and then Eichberg, referring to the hill of the local grand cru vineyard. Notably, the original German spelling was Egisheim; the letter “U” was inserted to “Frenchify” the toponym, resulting in a phonetic francization. The cited castles—likely ancient watchtowers overseeing the plains and foothills—were only fully constructed in ashlar stone by the 12th century. They bore names like castel de Vaudémont, burg de Weckmund, Wahlenburg (or Wahlenbourg), and Dagsbourg (or Dabo), after dominant lordly families. The town long belonged to the Eguisheim-Dabo line, while the lesser Weckmund and Wahlenbourg families—possibly named retroactively after their castles—were connected through marriage.

== History ==
Human presence in the area as early as the Paleolithic age is testified by archaeological excavations. Two parts from a human skull (from the frontal and parietal bones) were found in 1865 and given to Charles-Frédéric Faudel, a physician in nearby Colmar, who carefully described the find and noted they were found undisturbed between animal bones, which allowed for a relative dating at a time when the very existence of prehistoric humans was still doubted. The find became known in France in 1867 through Paul Broca, and subsequently became a topic of discussion in the debate over what would become paleoanthropology. Jean Louis Armand de Quatrefages de Bréau and Ernest Hamy, in their 1873 Crania ethnica, grouped Eguisheim and others with the finds at Neanderthal and Naulette, creating a "race of Canstadt" that was so flexible that almost all fossil remains of humans would fit.

Gustav Schwalbe (who first published on the skull in 1897), in a comparison with other skull fragments including those found in Spy, Belgium, concluded the skull was sufficiently different from Neanderthal skulls and approached the measurements of modern humans. One reviewer cast some doubt on Schwalbe's comparison and argued that only the cranial vault was substantially different from the others, but this, he said, could have been a normal variation from the mean within a group. Later scholars seem to have accepted the identification of the skull as belonging to a Neanderthal, though Schwalbe again, in 1902, insisted on the difference between the Eguisheim and Neanderthal skulls. In 1904 Schwalbe proposed a species he called Homo primigenius for what at least one of his contemporaries called Home neandertalensis, and excluded the Eguisheim skull from that category.

In early historic times it was inhabited by the Gaul tribe of the Senones; the Romans conquered the village and developed here the cultivation of wine.

In the early Middle Ages, the Dukes of Alsace built a castle here (11th century) around which the current settlement developed.

== Climate ==
Eguisheim has a climate that is principally oceanic being influenced by the Atlantic Ocean, it is warm and temperate. It is rated as CfB on the Köppen-Geiger scale. Because Eguisheim is landinward temperatures in the summer regularly exceed 25 °C (77 °F). January is generally the coldest month, although the temperature occasionally drops below 0 °C, the average temperature is above freezing point. May and June are usually the wettest months of the year (there is rainfall almost every other day). June, July and August are the hottest months with the most sun. September is not extremely wet or hot, making it very suitable for the harvest of grapes.

== Wine ==
Eguisheim has two areas which produce wine of exceptional quality, Eichberg (in English: Oak Mountain) and Pfersigberg (in English: Peach Mountain), characterised by the very hard Muschelkalk. Besides the usual-quality wines, Eguisheim produces Edelzwicker, Côte d'Eguisheim (a local high-end variety of Edelzwicker) and Gentil, all blends of the "noble" grapes grown locally.

== Tourism ==
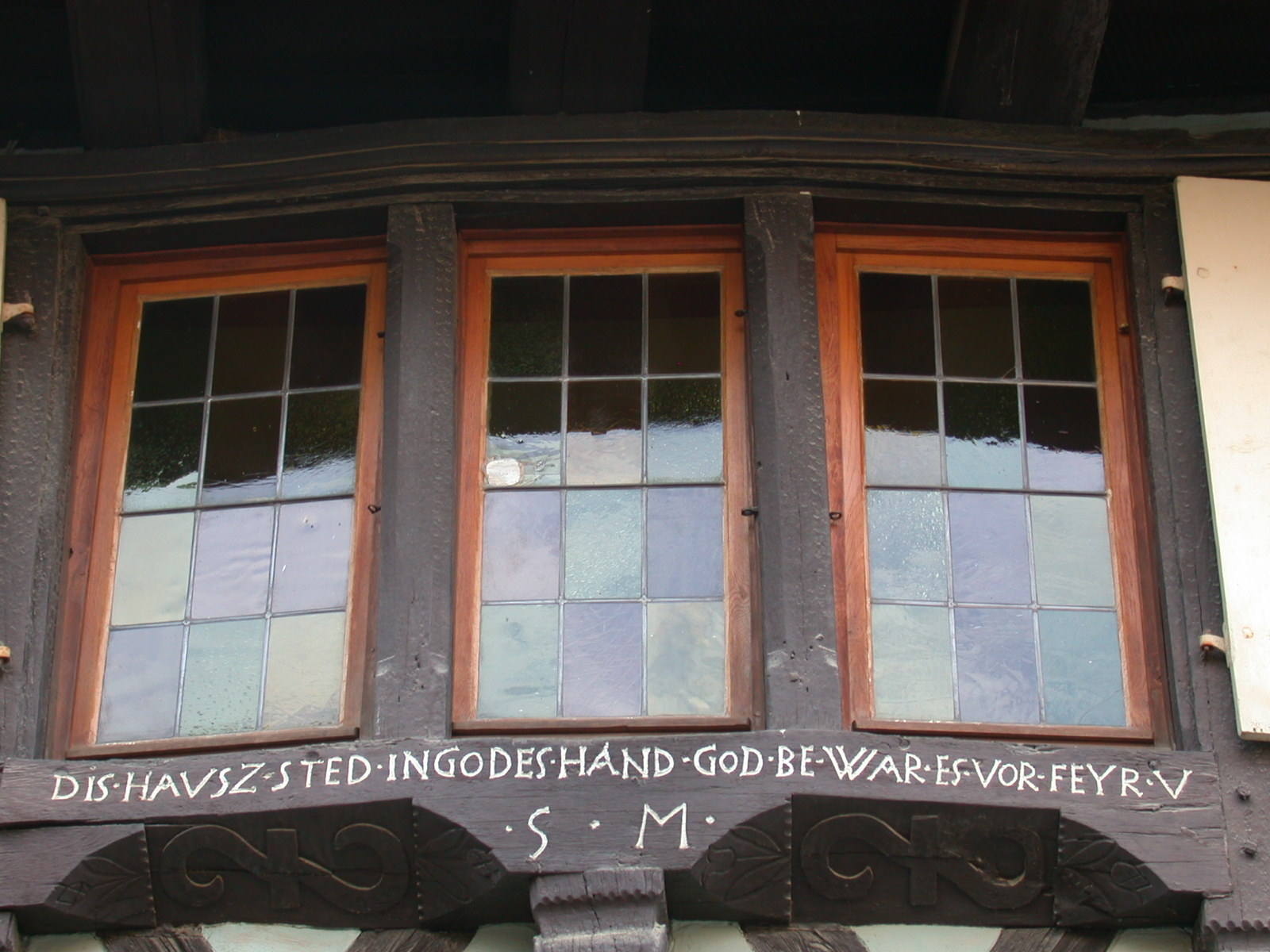
A window in Eguisheim with an inscription in Alsatian.

The village is a popular tourist destination, in part because the Alsace "Wine Route" passes the village. The village is close to Husseren-les-Châteaux and is in the middle of vineyards. The village is connected to Husseren-les-Châteaux by the Route du Vin (D14). Around the Route du Vin is a wine trail through the vineyards called Sentier viticole Eguisheim, which tries to explain the different grape varieties and the way wine is made in Alsace.

The area around Eguisheim is popular with hikers and cyclists. There are many marked trails. Popular destinations are Les Trois Châteaux (in Husseren-les-Châteaux) and Château de Hagueneck. A little further away are Château du Hohlandsbourg and Château de Pflixbourg, which can be reached on foot or by car.

The village is also a Village Cigogne d'Alsace (in Alsatian: Elsässisches Storckadorf), meaning that there are storks in the village. Eguisheim has a park dedicated to the white stork (Ciconia ciconia) which is freely accessible.

== Notable people ==
Leo IX (1002–1054), pope of the Catholic Church from 12 February 1049 to his death in 1054. Eguisheim was his birthplace on 21 June 1002. At this time Eguisheim was German.

== International relations ==
Eguisheim is twinned with

- Hautvillers, France
- La Louvière, Belgium
- Hinterzarten, Germany
- (United States) Castroville, Texas

It has also friendship agreements with:

- Aubusson, France
- Brussels, Belgium
- (United States) Tazewell, Tennessee, USA

== See also ==
- Communes of the Haut-Rhin département

== Gallery ==
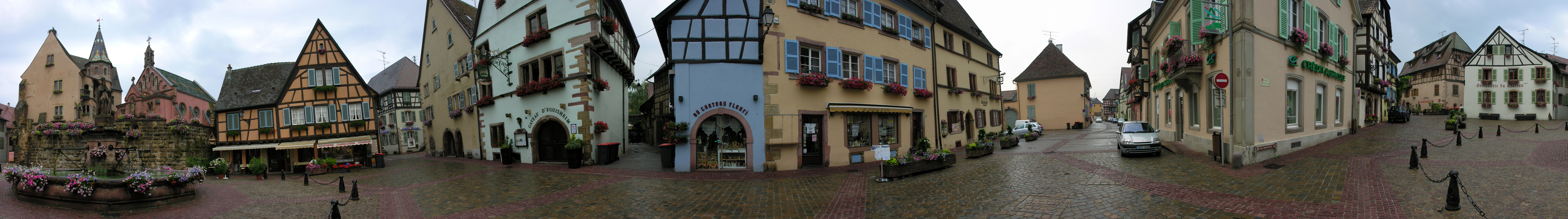
