= Cotefredus =

Duke of Alamannia from c. 690 - 709

See Gottfried for the given name.

Cotefredus (also Gotfrid or Gotefrid, modernized Gottfried) (c. 650–709) was the Duke of Alamannia in the late 7th century and until his death. He was of the house of the Agilolfing, which was the dominant ruling family in the Frankish Duchy of Bavaria.

In a document dated to the year 700 in Cannstatt, Cotefredus at the request of a priest named Magulfus donated the castle of Biberburg to the monastery of Saint Gall.

Cotefredus fought a war over his de facto independence with the mayor of the palace Pepin of Heristal. The war was unfinished when Cotefredus died in 709. His sons, Lanfredus and Theudebald, had the support of Pepin and succeeded him.

It has often been stated that Cotefredus married a daughter of Theodo of Bavaria, but there is no conclusive evidence to support this assertion. It is largely based on conjecture, because his third son, Odilo, later ruled in Bavaria. Furthermore, Cotefredus died several years before most of Theodo's children are believed to have been born. Even if he had been betrothed to Theodo's daughter, whose name is unknown, she would have been little more than a child and unable to consummate such a union before his death, let alone bear him multiple children.

One theory suggests that he had a Merovingian wife, based on the fact that several of his descendants bore Merovingian names, including the sons of his great-great-granddaughter Hildegard, wife of Charlemagne. The Agilolfings were, in fact, ruling Bavaria and Alemannia under the suzerainty of the Merovingian dynasty at this time, so such a union is not improbable. However, there is currently no further evidence to confirm this.

The assosciation of the Agilofings and Merovingians is known. Garibald I married Waldrada, who had previously been married to two Merovingian kings. The second marriage was annulled by the church and most likely produced Tasillo I, the founder of the Agilofings. This is why Count Childebran considered Tasilo III a kinsman.

== Issue ==
- From his son Huoching (Huocin, Houchi, or Hug) (675–744) came the later stock of the Ahalolfings.
- Daughter, Regarde married Hildeprand of Spoleto.
- Lanfredus (-730), Duke of Alamannia
- Theudebald (-745), Duke of Alamannia
- Odilo (Bef 709–748), Duke of Bavaria
- Liutfrid, youngest son.

== Sources ==
- Geuenich, Dieter. Geschichte der Alemannen. Kohlhammer Verlag: Stuttgart, 2004. ISBN 3-17-018227-7
- Gotfrid at Mittelalter-Geneaolgie
