= Château de Guirbaden =

Ruined castle in Mollkirch in the Bas-Rhin département of France

Coordinates: 48°29′37″N 7°22′13″E

Plan of the castle of Guirbaden

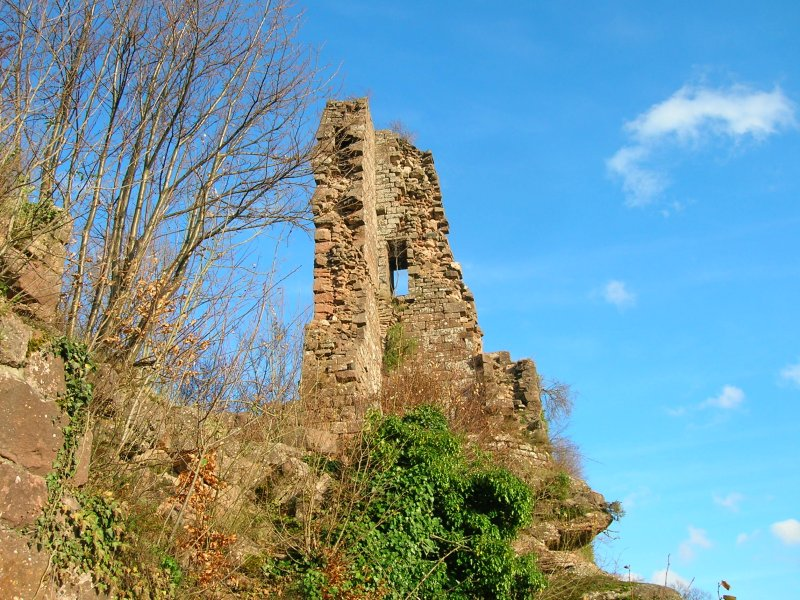
Château de Guirbaden

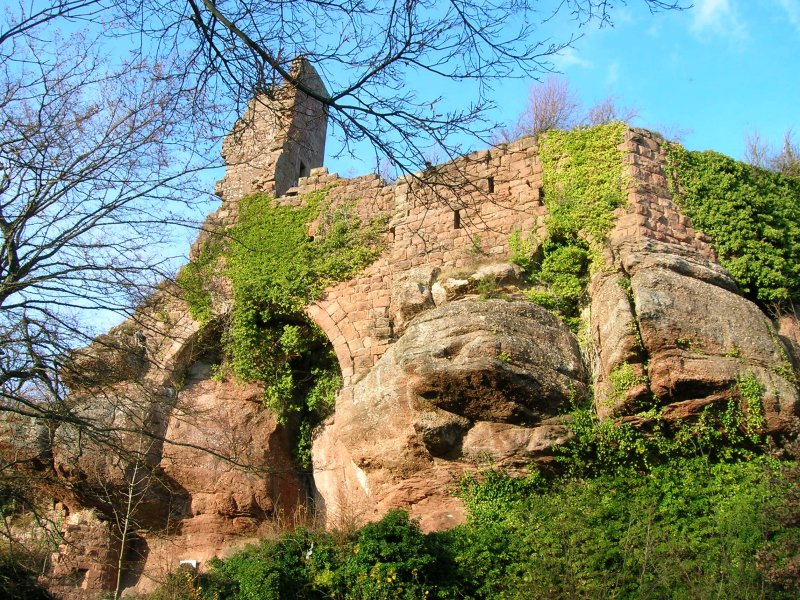
Château de Guirbaden

The Château de Guirbaden (or Girbaden) is a ruined castle in the commune of Mollkirch in the Bas-Rhin département of France.

It is situated in the Guirbaden forest, near the village of Mollkirch on the left bank of the Magel River, at an altitude of 565 m. The castle covers a larger area than any other in Alsace. Dating from the 11th century, over more than 500 years it suffered several attacks, destructions and reconstructions.

Privately owned, it has been listed since 1898 as a monument historique by the French Ministry of Culture.

== See also ==
- List of castles in France
