= Château de Hagueneck =

Castle in France

Coordinates: 48.0523°N 7.2751°E

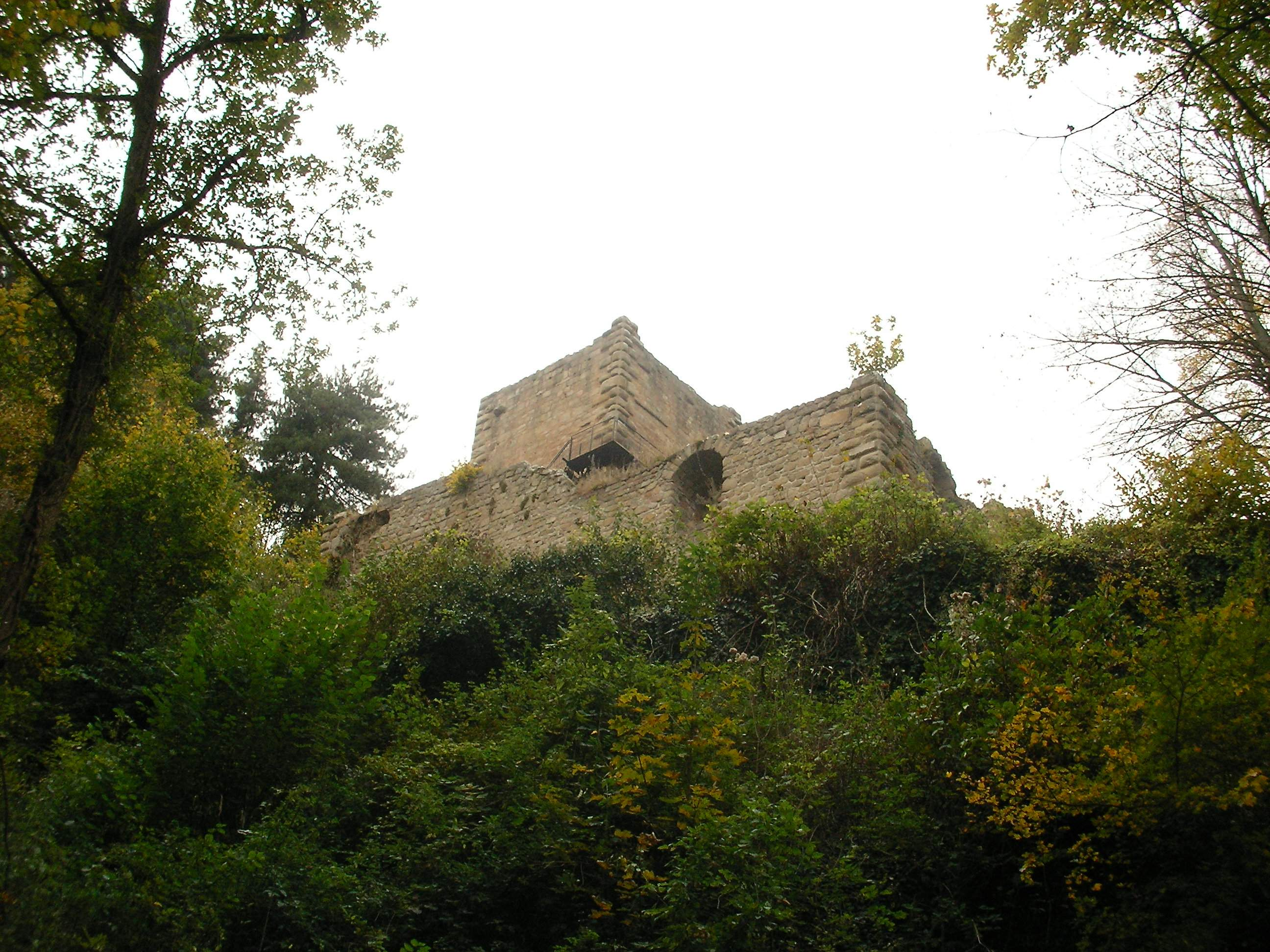
Ruins of the Hagueneck Castle

Château de Hagueneck is a ruined castle in the commune of Wettolsheim, in the department of Haut-Rhin, Alsace, France. It is a listed historical monument since 1923.
