= Duchy of Alsace =

Former political subdivision of the Frankish kingdoms

The Duchy of Alsace (Latin: Ducatus Alsacensi, Ducatum Elisatium; German: Herzogtum Elsaß) was a large political subdivision of the Frankish Empire during the last century and a half of Merovingian rule. It corresponded to the territory of Alsace and was carved out of southern Austrasia in the last decade of the reign of Dagobert I, probably to stabilise the southern reaches of Austrasia against Alemannia and Burgundy. By the late Middle Ages, the region was considered part of Swabia.

== Foundation ==
The term "Alsace" derives from the Germanic ali-land-sat-ja, meaning "one who sits in another land." Alsace was Alemanni territory, but not so much as Alemannia proper, which was east of the Rhine: it was, however, the "other" land in which some Alemanni had settled. In the Late Roman Empire, a district of Alsace (pagus Alsatiae) had been established in the region. Under Chlothar II, Alsace and Alemannia were granted their own law, the Pactus Alamannorum.

In 596, Childebert II bequeathed Alsace to his son Theuderic II, who was raised there. This attached it to Burgundy, but in 610 Theudebert II, Theuderic's brother of Austrasia, forced Alsace' cession to him only to lose it two years later to Burgundy again. In 623, when Chlothar II granted Austrasia to Dagobert, he excluded Alsace, the Vosges, and the Ardennes, but was shortly after forced to concede it to Dagobert by the Austrasian nobility. Sometime probably between 629 and 631 Dagobert granted it as a dukedom to Gundoin, a Frank from the Austrasian heartland of the Meuse valley, a move which tied Alsace more closely to the Austrasian court. Gundoin's duchy comprised both sides of the Vosges, the Burgundian Gate, and the Transjura; there were to be continuous early problems retaining the faithfulness of the Sundgau.

== Etichonid duchy ==
The creation of a duchy of Alsace corresponded with the creation of counties in the region. Thitherto counties had not been found in most of Austrasia, but by the eighth century they were common in the south. The counts of Alsace were known in contemporary Latin texts by the title grafio (plural grafiones), which may have indicated a slightly different office from that of the traditional comes (plural comites), which was used in the more Romanised parts of Gaul.

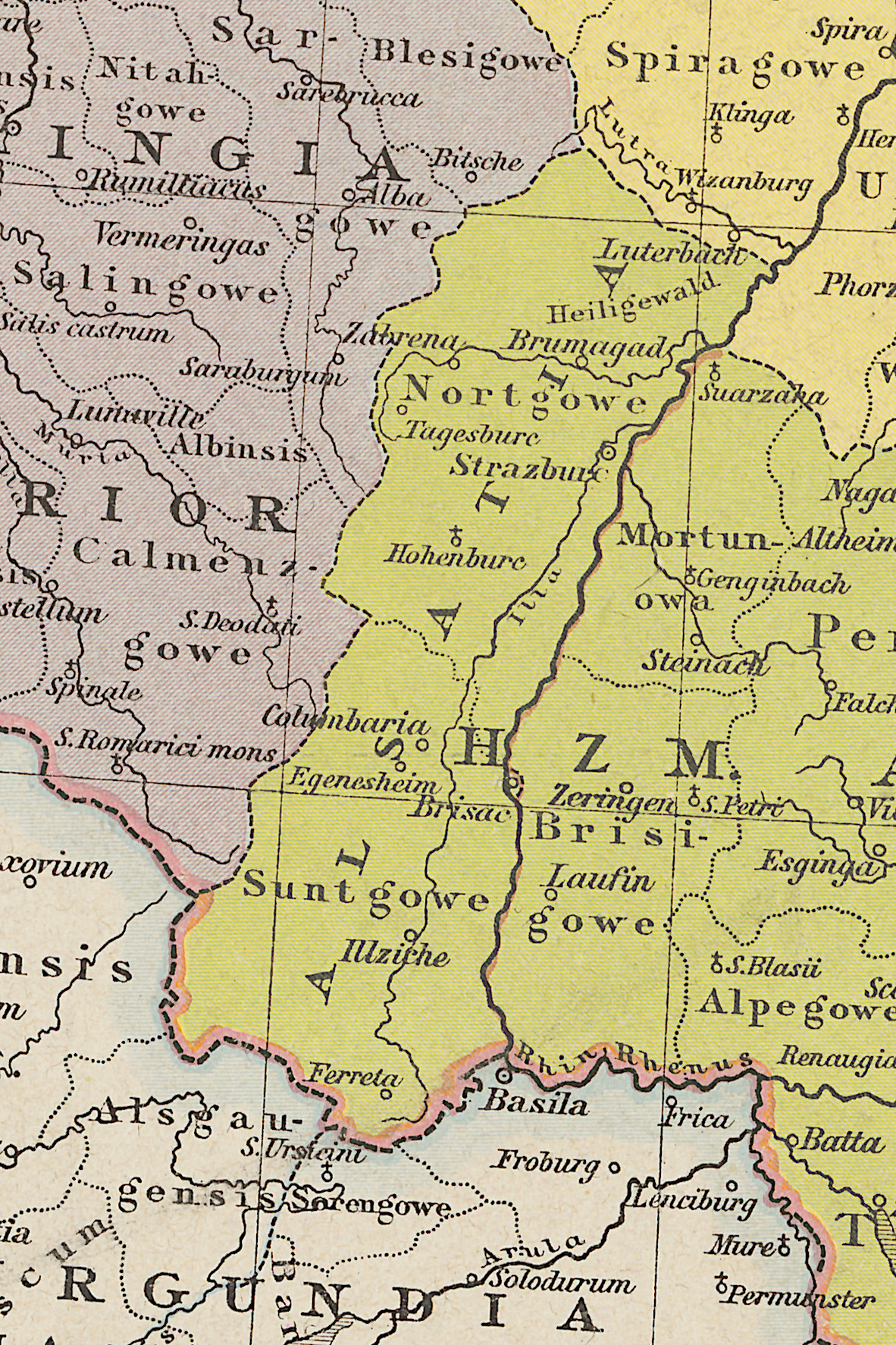
Alsace about 1000, divided into Nordgau and Sundgau

Under Gundoin's successors, the famous Etichonids, the counties — Alsace was already generally divided into a Nordgau and Sundgau — were brought under direct ducal control. From the very beginning, Gundoin had used monasteries and monastic foundation as tools in spreading his authority and in developing his regional economy by employing the industry of monks for secular benefit. Alsace was first spoken of as a ducatus in the 730s, though the correspondence of Alsace with the territory of the early duces can be inferred quite easily (for example, known dukes of Alsace referring to earlier dukes as their predecessors can only mean that the territorial unit of rule was the same). The term ducatus alsacensi, "Duchy of Alsace", only came into use under Louis the Pious, though there exists disputed evidence of its use as early as 735–737.

== Later history ==
Following the suppression of the Alemanni in 742–746 by Carloman, son of Charles Martel, the duchy of Alsace was dissolved in 742 when a successor for the deceased Duke Liutfrid was not named. While some historians have suggested an antipathy between the Etichonids and the Arnulfings to explain the dissolution of their power in Alsace, the Etichonids were allied with Charles Martel as early as the 720s, when he campaigned against the Alemanni, who were a constant thorn in the side of their Alsatian cousins. Some have interpreted the tripartite web of support between Alsatian monasteries, the Etichonid dukes and counts, and Theuderic IV as evidence of an attempt to stay outside of Arnulfing (subsequently Carolingian) control. In 722, Martel first defeated the Alemanni and in 744 some rebellious Alemans invaded Alsace, implying that it was considered loyal to Martel's successors, Carloman and Pepin the Short. Even Liutfrid himself may have died fighting on behalf of the Carolingians against the Alemanni. In any case, the peaceful dissolution of the duchy in Alsace mirrored the similar efforts of the Carolings elsewhere (notably Provence), while it was also part of a larger effort — which was notably violent in Alemannia and Aquitaine — to replace dukes, who had the power to command armies, with counts, who were royal officers responsible to and representative of royal power.

Alsace remained a distinct unit after 742. With the rise in influence of Hugh of Tours, who was a conscious ancestor of the Etichonid dukes, Louis the Pious first made reference to the ducatus alsicensi in 816, though it was still a ducatus without a dux. In 829, Louis's youngest son, Charles, was made duke of Alsace, Alemannia and Rhaetia, but in 831 his share of the empire was expanded and was made into a kingdom. By the Treaty of Verdun (843) it was made part of the kingdom of Middle Francia under Lothair I, to the displeasure of Louis the German, who would have liked to see it attached to Alemanni in his East Francia. Upon Lothair's death in 855, Alsace became a part of Lotharingia in the threefold division of Middle Francia. Lothair II, because of his kinship with the still-powerful Etichonids, had firm support in Alsace throughout his tumultuous reign. In 867, he created the first Duke of Alsace in over a century when he granted the ducatum Elisatium to his illegitimate son Hugh, who had an ancient Etichonid name. In 869, Lothair granted protection of his kingdom to Louis the German immediately before his death on a trip to Rome. When Louis fell ill later that year, Charles, now king of all West Francia, tried to annex Alsace and made Hugh swear allegiance to him, but Louis recovered and by the Treaty of Meerssen (870) Alsace was attached to East Francia at long last. There is little evidence for an Alsatian dukedom after that, though some have interpreted references to an Uto dux in 999 as implying that the ducatus Elisatium was still not attached to the Duchy of Swabia by then. It eventually would be, however.

== Dukes ==
- Gundoin, fl. 630s
- Boniface, until c. 662
- Adalrich, c. 662–after 683
- Adalbert, after 683–723
- Liutfrid, 723–after 742
- Charles, 829–831
- Hugh, 867–885
- Udo, fl. c. 999

== Sources ==
- Lewis, Archibald R. (1976). "The Dukes in the Regnum Francorum, A.D. 550–751". Speculum. 51 (3): 381–410. doi:10.2307/2851704. JSTOR 2851704. S2CID 162248053.
- Hummer, Hans J. (2005). Politics and Power in Early Medieval Europe: Alsace and the Frankish Realm, 600–1000. Cambridge University Press.
