= Sundgau =

Area in Alsace, France

Sundgau
Land Area	663 km^{2}
Population	61 841 inhabitants (1999)
Capital	Altkirch
Cantons	4
Communes	112

Sundgau (French pronunciation: [suŋɡo] or [syŋɡo]; German: [ˈzʊntɡaʊ]) is a geographical territory in the southern Alsace region (Haut Rhin and Belfort), on the eastern edge of France. The name is derived from Alemannic German Sunt-gowe ("South shire"), denoting an Alemannic county in the Old High German period. The principal city and historical capital is Altkirch.

The considerably smaller French pays of Sundgau, implemented by the 1999 Voynet law, roughly corresponds to the arrondissement of Altkirch, comprising four cantons and 112 communes in the south of the larger Sundgau region.

== Geography ==
The hilly region is bounded on the south by the Swiss border and the foothills of the Jura Mountains, in the east by the valley of the Rhine in the vicinity of Basel, to the north by Mulhouse and the potassium-rich basin of Alsace, and to the west by the Belfort Gap. It comprises parts of the modern Department of Haut-Rhin and the Territory of Belfort in the regions of Alsace and the Franche-Comté.

The fertile loess soil has traditionally favoured a non-specialised agriculture, with crop production being largely organised into strips. The main crops are maize, wheat and colza.

The Ill, the most important river in Alsace aside from the Rhine, crosses Sundgau from south to north before flowing into the Rhine near Strasbourg. Its source is at Winkel in the foothills of the Jura. Other rivers define the region's valleys, such as the Largue, which rises near Courtavon, passes through Dannemarie, and meets the Ill at Illfurth.

In medieval times, monks raised carp in the small valley ponds and carpe frite (fried carp) remains a regional speciality. The images of two carp also appear in the coat of arms of Sundgau.

== Prehistory ==
Archaeological digs have revealed vestiges of palaeolithic and Neolithic settlements. Traces of Bronze Age cremation pyres have also been found. Excavations at Illfurth date from the Iron Age (650 BC to 430 BC).

== History ==
In the 1st century BC, the Sequani tribe (the most "Gaulish of Gauls" according to historian Henri Martin), which was centered around Besançon, settled in Sundgau. From 70 BC, they waged perpetual warfare with their neighbours, the Aedui, calling upon German mercenaries, led by Ariovistus. When the conflict finished, the Germans settled into the region, and the Sequani, to remove them appealed to the Romans. Julius Caesar defeated Ariovistus in 58 BC near Cernay, and a long domination by the Romans commenced. This ended suddenly in 405, when the Alamani crossed the Rhine and occupied Sundgau. They, in turn, were followed by the Franks following their victory at the Battle of Tolbiac in 496. Sundgau was incorporated into the kingdom of Austrasia and Christianity was introduced under the Merovingians.

=== Francia ===
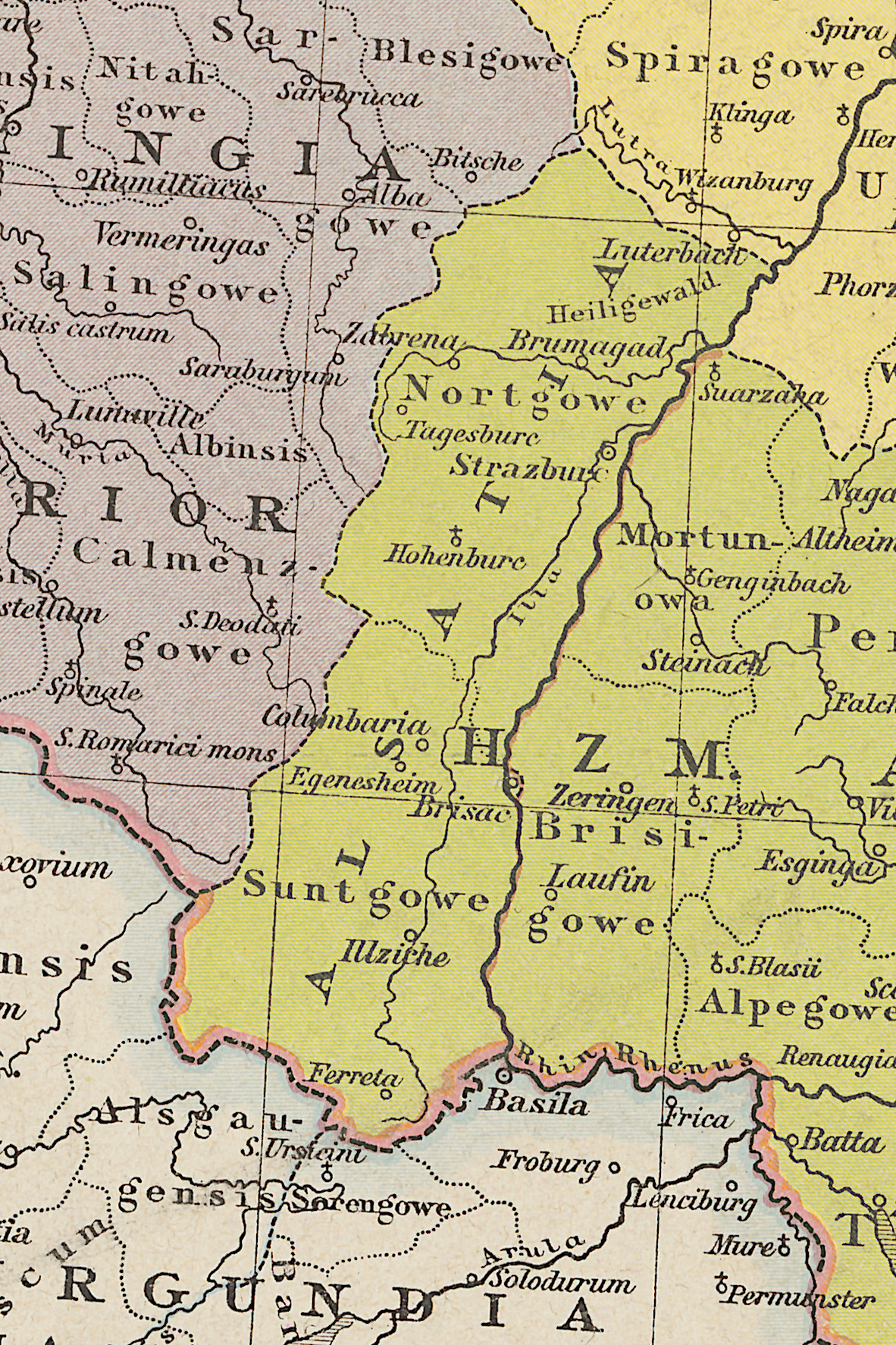
Alsace about 1000, divided into Nordgau and Sundgau

About 750, the Duchy of Alsace was divided into two counties: Nordgau (Unterelsass) and Sundgau, the latter being mentioned in the Treaty of Mersen in 870. Historically then, Sundgau coincides with the lands of the counts of Ferrette and Habsburg, excepting the town of Mulhouse and its territories of Illzach and Modenheim. Geographically, Sundgau denotes a more restricted area comprising the hilly country to the south of Mulhouse and reaching to the valley of Lucelle.

During the 9th century and the 10th century Sundgau was administered by the Lieutfried family. Following the breakup of Charlemagne's empire, the region entered a period of instability, culminating in the emergence of feudalism. From 925 on, the Sundgau belonged to the Duchy of Swabia; it remained a part of Swabia until the Duchy disintegrated in the 13th century.

=== Holy Roman Empire ===
Landgraviate of Sundgau Landgrafschaft Sundgau (German) Landgraviat Sundgau (French)
- 750s–1648
- Status: State of the Holy Roman Empire
- Capital: Altkirch
- Government: Principality
- Historical era: Middle Ages
  - Alsace partitioned in twain: 750s
  - Landgraviate established: 750s
  - To Habsburgs: 1135
  - Sold to France: 1648
Preceded by	Succeeded by
Duchy of Alsace / Duchy of Alsace	Early modern France

In 1125, Frederic, son of Theodoric I of Montbéliard, inherited the south of Alsace and became Count of Ferrette. So, from 1125 to 1324, a large part of the Sundgau was administered by the counts of Ferrette. Ulrich III (1310–1324) conquered the valley of Saint-Amarin but died with no male issue. His daughter Jeanne married Albert II, Duke of Austria in 1324, and the County of Ferrette fell to Austria and was integrated with the other Habsburg possessions in the area.

The Landgraviate of Sundgau (also known as Landgraviate of Upper Alsace), the successor of the Carolingian county, had been administered by the counts of Habsburg since 1135. They had owned the adjacent County of Sundgau even earlier. The Habsburgs enlarged their possessions in the area with numerous acquisitions in the following centuries, until by the mid-14th century almost all of the former Carolingian county was in the possession of Habsburg. Their consolidated territories in the area became known simply as the Sundgau, and belonged to the Austrian Circle of the Empire after 1512. The Habsburgian Sundgau was administered from Ensisheim by a bailli (bailiff or seneschal) and divided into four bailiwicks (Landser, Thann, Altkirch and Ferrette). Enguerrand VII, Lord of Coucy tried unsuccessfully to claim the Sundgau during the Gugler War of 1375.

As of 1500, the Austrian Sundgau encompassed most of the southern Alsace and was bordered by the following states (from the north, clockwise): Imperial City of Colmar, County of Württemberg, the Austrian Breisgau, the Margraviate of Baden, the Imperial City of Basel, the Prince-Bishopric of Basel, the County of Württemberg (County of Montbéliard), the Duchy of Lorraine, the Abbacy of Murbach, and the Prince-Bishopric of Strasbourg (the Mundat). The Imperial City of Mulhouse formed an enclave surrounded by the Sundgau.

The Reformation did not trouble Sundgau, despite the proximity of Basel and Mulhouse. The country maintained its fidelity to the religion of the Habsburgs, Catholicism.

Commencing in 1632, the Thirty Years' War broke upon Sundgau, with a violence unprecedented in the history of the region. The Swedish, supported by France, invaded the country, pillaging and burning all in their path. In reaction, the inhabitants of the countryside revolted. But the rebellion was subdued, and the Swedes hanged the ringleaders from roadside trees. From 1634, the Swedes ceded their fortresses to the French, and in 1648 the war ended with the Treaty of Westphalia. The butcher's bill was disastrous – some parts of Sundgau had lost up to 80% of their population. The country, only German speaking at that time, was conquered and annexed by France, and in 1659, the counthood of Ferrette was granted to Cardinal Mazarin (nominally by the then 21-year-old Louis XIV).

=== France and Germany ===
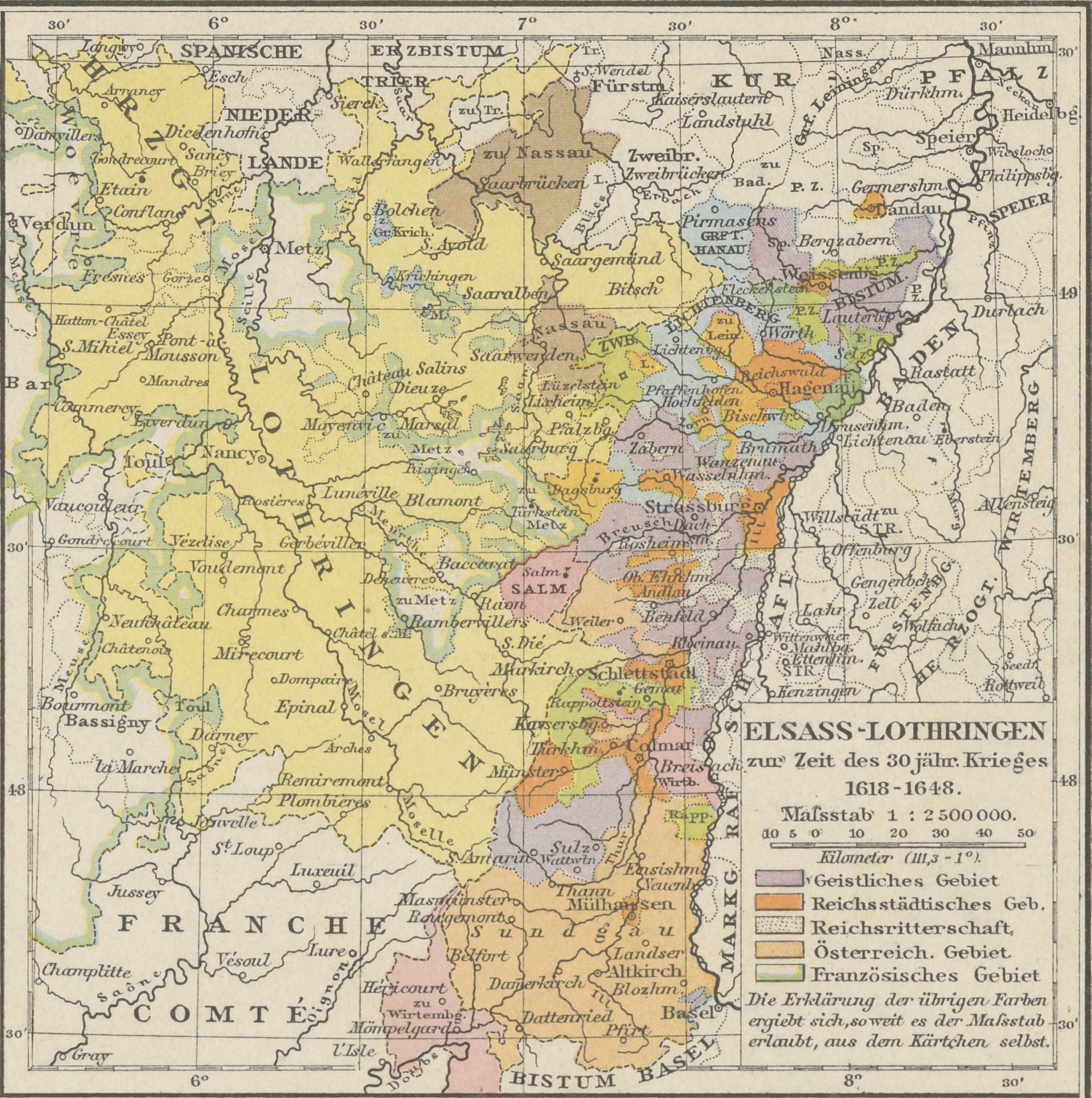
Sundgau (bottom of the image, in faded orange) in 1648 just before its cession to France.

The beginning of the 18th century was a period of prosperity with the development of agriculture and textile industry. But economic and social conditions deteriorated in the second half of the century, with overpowering taxation, and occasional famines.

In 1789, the repercussions of the French Revolution reached Sundgau, and many conflicts arose in the townships, mainly due to the unpopularity of the ruling classes. In 1790, Sundgau was included into the département of Haut-Rhin, and Altkirch became its principal town.

Order was restored during the Consulate and the Empire. Little changed during the 19th century, agriculture remaining the principal economic activity, despite the establishment of industries such as the Gilardoni tileworks in 1835 and the construction of Xavier Jourdains' looms in Altkirch.

As a result of the 1870 Franco-Prussian War, Sundgau returned to Germany as part of the Imperial territory of Alsace-Lorraine. Economic development picked up, and the region opened up to the rest of Alsace, for want of trade with France.

The battles of the First World War commenced in Sundgau in August 1914. The French blew up the viaduct of Dannemarie, and the front stabilised and extended from the Vosges to the Swiss frontier. The population suffered artillery bombardments and, for fear of spying, many were evacuated into those communes untouched by war.

Sundgau reverted to France in 1918, but its reintegration posed several problems; since Alsace was German speaking, they now saw themselves obliged to express themselves in French. By way of derogation, German was taught in schools for three hours a week. The administration was only in French and the mayor was appointed by the French government.

Between the wars, 56% of the population worked in agriculture, 28% in industry and only 7% in services.

In the Second World War after the declaration of war, the communes bordering on the Rhine were evacuated. The German army crossed the river on 15 June 1940. Following the Armistice of 22 June, Sundgau was once again in German hands. Elsaßian Jews, a few North Africans and French-speakers were expelled to the free zone between it and Vichy France. Pre-1918 German names of communes were restored, and the school system reverted to speaking only German. Youngsters were enrolled in Hitler Youth from 1942.

From then also, men born between 1914 and 1925 were drafted in the Wehrmacht.

General Jean de Lattre de Tassigny's troops reached the Sundgau in November 1944, with Seppois-le-Bas (Nieder Seppbach) being the first. As after the first World War, language issues arose. From 1945 to 1984 the use of German in newspapers was restricted to a maximum of 25% (despite the fact that the population was still mainly German speaking).

Post-war, there was a period of reconstruction and economic growth. Jean Fourastié's Trente Glorieuses, the thirty years of economic growth 1945 to 1973, ended by the first Oil Crisis, and the number of agricultural workers dropped year by year. More than 35% of the population currently work in services.

== Organisation ==
Sundgau is an arrondissement (the arrondissement of Altkirch) and is divided into 4 cantons: Dannemarie, Altkirch, Hirsingue and Ferrette. These run roughly along a north–south axis (see map) and consist of 112 communes. These communes are in turn grouped into 8 communities and one village (Bernwiller) for economic and tourism promotion purposes.

- The Community of communes of Porte d'Alsace: 33 communes
- The Community of communes of Alsatian Jura: 24 communes
- The Community of communes of Illfurth: 10 communes
- The Community of communes of Valley of the Largue: 9 communes
- The Community of communes of Altkirch: 4 communes
- The Community of communes of Hirsingue: 11 communes
- The Community of communes of Valley of Hundsbach: 12 communes
- The Community of communes of Ill and Gersbach: 9 communes

== Population ==
The population reached 61,841 inhabitants in 1999 (up from 57,112 in 1990), an increase of 8.3%. Thus it paralleled the demographic growth both of Haut-Rhin (which showed an increase of 5.3% in the same period), and, more broadly, that of Alsace itself, (which showed an increase of 6.8%).

Altkirch is the most populous of Sundgauvien communes, with 5,386 inhabitants (1999). This is followed by Hirsingue (2,057 inhabitants), then Dannemarie (2,011 inhabitants). Notably, 70% of the population is spread out among 103 communes of less than 1,000 inhabitants each. Finally, 19.2% of the inhabitants are aged under 15, while 19.3% are over 60. As in the remainder of France, the proportion of over-60s is growing.

== Economy ==
Sundgau remains primarily an agricultural region with traditional activities. Important urban centres immediately outside Sundgau such as the tri-national conurbation of Basel, the urbanised area of Belfort-Montbéliard-Sochaux, and the Mulhouse conurbation, are attractive as providers of goods, services, and employment. Qualifications are lower and revenues higher as a result of border area employment and its economic and social impact.

Nevertheless, Sundgau remains underequipped, notably for company startups. Although several enterprises have started during the last ten years, it is not sufficiently attractive as an employment basin because of the counterattractions of the nearby conurbations.

== Transport ==
=== Road network ===
Sundgau is ringed by major roads, such as the A36 motorway between Belfort and Mulhouse, and the A35 toll-road, between Mulhouse and Basel; nevertheless, the elected representatives agree that the road network is outdated. Other important roadways are the D419, crossing the region from east to west between Belfort and Basel and passing through Dannemarie and Altkirch, and the North-South D432, passing through Illfurth, Altkirch, Hirsingue and Ferrette.

Several current projects aim at improving the road network and bypassing villages. These include diversions at Retzwiller and Dannemarie, and the Spechbach-le-Bas and Hochstatt bypasses. Another large project, the extension of the rapid road from Dornach as far as Altkirch, is under discussion.

=== Railway network ===
The Paris-Bâle line serves the towns of Dannemarie, Altkirch and Illfurth. Regional trains are relatively frequent, and useful for Sundgauviens working in Mulhouse or Belfort. Work on a Dijon-Mulhouse line of the TGV Rhine-Rhône is planned to start in 2006.

=== Canal network ===
The canal from the Rhône to the Rhine crosses Sundgau by Montreux-Vieux, Dannemarie and Illfurth. It has existed since 1824 and was conceived by Freycinet. Nowadays, it is too narrow for large barges and serves mainly for pleasure craft.

A large project for the construction of a canal linking the Rhine to the Saône, passing along the Doubs, has been abandoned. Indirectly, it would have linked central Europe (Rhine, Danube, North Sea and Baltic Sea) to the Mediterranean without having to ship merchandise through the Straits of Gibraltar. But the anger of agriculturalists and environmentalists influenced the Minister of the Environment to abandon the project in 1998.

== Tourism ==
The General Council of Haut-Rhin has taken an interest in Sundgau and in developing tourism in the region since 2000, along the lines of the management of the source of the Ill or the construction of a rest area on the route D419 near Chavannes-sur-l'étang. Sundgau is a region where the lifestyle permits the development of Green Tourism (i.e. where the visitor seeks calm, wishes to be in direct contact with nature, and has activities such as countryside walks and drives available).

== Heritage ==
- Château of Ferrette, the château of the counts of Ferrette
- Château of Morimont
- Château of Landskron
- Hundsbach Mill
- Ancient Cistercian abbey of Lucelle, destroyed during the Revolution, and rebuilt as a hotel
- Romanesque church of Feldbach
- Romanesque church of Altkirch
- Sundgauvien museum in Altkirch
- Hirtzbach (the village won 4 flowers in a national competition organised by the Conseil pour le Fleurissement de la France which promotes flower-planting)

== Notable Sundgauviens ==
- Xavier Jourdain, textile industrialist (1798–1866)
- Jean-Jacques Henner, painter (1829–1905)
- Charles Zumstein, farmer-poet, diviner (1867-1963)
- Dominik Richert, author of memoirs of the First World War (1893-1977 )
- Félis Voulot, sculptor (1899–1905)
- Daniel Zimmermann, novelist, educator (1935–2000)

Nathan Katz 1892- 1981 poet

== Bibliography ==
- Claude Stadelmann, Le merveilleux existe. Contes et légendes du Sundgau, 2005
