= Carolingian dynasty =

Frankish noble family founded by Charles Martel

Carolingian dynasty Carlovingians
- Autograph of Charlemagne
- Parent house: Pippinids
- Country: Carolingian Empire: Austrasia; Neustria; Burgundy; Alamannia; Italy; Aquitaine; Bavaria; Bohemia; Saxony; Brittany; Thuringia; West Francia; Middle Francia; East Francia
- Founded: 613 (as mayors); 751 (as kings); 800 (as emperors)
- Founder: Pepin the Elder (as mayor); Pepin the Short (as king); Charlemagne (emperor)
- Final ruler: Arnulf of Carinthia (emperor); Louis V of France (king)
- Titles: List: Holy Roman Emperor; King of the Franks; King of the Lombards; King of Italy; King of Aquitaine; King of Burgundy; Duke of Bohemia; Duke of Bavaria; Duke of Maine; Count of Vermandois; Count of Valois; King of East Francia; King of Middle Francia; King of West Francia
- Estates: Francia, West Francia, East Francia, Lotharingia, Italy, Holy Roman Empire
- Deposition: 987 (death of Louis V)
- Cadet branches: Lombard branch (extinct); Aquitainian branch (extinct); German branch (extinct); French branch (extinct)

The Carolingian dynasty (/ˌkærəˈlɪndʒiən/ KARR-ə-LIN-jee-ən; known variously as the Carlovingians, Carolingus, Carolings, Karolinger or Karlings) was a Frankish noble family named after Charles Martel and his grandson Charlemagne, descendants of the Arnulfing and Pippinid clans of the 7th century AD. The dynasty consolidated its power in the 8th century, eventually making the offices of mayor of the palace and dux et princeps Francorum hereditary, and becoming the de facto rulers of the Franks as the real powers behind the Merovingian throne. In 751 the Merovingian dynasty which had ruled the Franks was overthrown with the consent of the Papacy and the aristocracy, and Pepin the Short, son of Martel, was crowned king of the Franks. The Carolingian dynasty reached its peak in 800 with the crowning of Charlemagne as the first emperor of the Romans in the West in over three centuries. Charlemagne's death in 814 began an extended period of fragmentation of the Carolingian Empire and decline that would eventually lead to the evolution of the Kingdom of France and the Holy Roman Empire.

== Name ==
The Carolingian dynasty takes its name from Carolus, the Latinised name of multiple Frankish kings including Charlemagne and Charles Martel. The name originates from a common Germanic word, rendered in Old High German as Karl or Kerl, meaning 'man', 'husband', or 'freeman'.

== History ==
=== Origins ===
==== Pippin I and Arnulf of Metz (613–645) ====
The Carolingian line first began with two important rival Frankish families, the Pippinids and Arnulfings, whose destinies became intermingled in the early 7th century. Both men came from noble backgrounds on the western borders of the Austrasia territory between the Meuse and Moselle rivers, north of Liège.

The first two figures, Pippin I of Landen and Arnulf of Metz, from whom historians have taken the family names, both first appeared in the fourth book of the Continuations of Fredegar as advisers to Chlotar II of Neustria, who 'incited' revolt against King Theuderic II and Brunhild of Austrasia in 613. Through shared interests, Pippin and Arnulf allied their families through the marriage of Pippin's daughter Begga and Arnulf's son Ansegisel.

As repayment for their help during the Austrasian conquest, Chlotar rewarded both men with important positions of power in Austrasia. However, Arnulf was the first to gain. He was bestowed the bishopric of Metz in 614, entrusting him with the management of the Austrasian capital and the education of Chlotar's young son, the future Dagobert I. This is a position he would hold until his retirement in 629 after Chlotar's death, when he left for a small ecclesiastical community near Habendum; he was later buried at the monastery of Remiremont after his death c. 645.

==== Pippin I (624–640) ====
Pippin was not immediately rewarded, but eventually was given the position of maior palatti or 'mayor of the palace' of Austrasia in 624. This reward secured Pippin a position of prime importance with the Merovingian royal court. The mayor of the palace would act as the mediator between the King and the magnates of the region; as Paul Fouracre summarises, they were 'regarded as the most important non-royal person in the kingdom.' The reason Pippin was not rewarded sooner is not certain, but two mayors, Rado (613 – c. 617) and Chucus (c. 617 – c. 624), are believed to have preceded him and were potentially political rivals connected to the fellow Austrasian 'Gundoinings' noble family. Once elected, Pippin served faithfully under Chlotar until the latter's death in 629, and solidified the Pippinids' position of power within Austrasia by supporting Chlotar's son Dagobert, who became King of Austrasia in 623. Pippin, with support from Arnulf and other Austrasian magnates, even used the opportunity to support the killing of an important political rival Chrodoald, an Agilolfing lord.

Following King Dagobert I's ascent to the throne in c. 629, he returned the Frankish capital back to Paris in Neustria, from whence it had been removed by Chlotar in 613. As a result, Pippin lost his position as mayor and the support of the Austrasian magnates, who were seemingly irritated by his inability to persuade the King to return the political centre to Austrasia. Instead, Dagobert turned to the Pippinids' political rival family, the Gundoinings, whose connections in Adalgesil, Cunibert, archbishop of Cologne, Otto and Radulf (who would later revolt in 642) once again removed the Pippinid and Arnulfing influence in the Austrasia assemblies.

Pippin did not reappear in the historical record until Dagobert's death in 638, when he had seemingly been reinstated as mayor of Austrasia and began to support the new young King Sigebert III. According to the Continuations, Pippin made arrangements with his rival, Archbishop Cunibert, to get Austrasian support for the 10-year-old King Sigibert III, who ruled Austrasia whilst his brother Clovis II ruled over Neustria and Burgundy. Soon after securing his position once again, he unexpectedly died in 640.

==== Grimoald (640–656) ====
Following Pippin's sudden death, the Pippinid family worked swiftly to secure their position. Pippin's daughter Gertrude and wife Itta founded and entered the Nivelles Abbey, and his only son Grimoald worked to secure his father's position of maior palatii. The position was not hereditary and therefore passed to another Austrasian noble, Otto, the tutor of Sigebert III. According to the Continuations, Grimoald began to work with his father's accomplice Cunibert to remove Otto from office. He finally succeeded in c. 641, when Leuthari II, Duke of Alamannia killed Otto under Grimoald's and, we must assume, Cunibert's orders. Grimoald then became mayor of Austrasia. His power at this time was extensive, with properties in Utrecht, Nijmegen, Tongeren and Maastricht; he was even called 'ruler of the realm' by Desiderius of Cahors in 643.

This could not have been done if Grimoald had not secured Sigibert III's support. The Pippinids already gained royal patronage from Pippin I's support, but this was further bolstered by Grimoald's role in Duke Radulf of Thuringia's rebellion. Just prior to Otto's assassination, in c. 640 Radulf revolted against the Merovingians and made himself King of Thuringia. Sigibert, with an Austrasian army including Grimoald and Duke Adalgisel, went on campaign and after a brief victory against Fara, son of the assassinated Agilofing lord Chrodoald, the Austrasians met Radulf on the River Unstrut where he had set up a stronghold. What followed was a disorganized battle spread over several days, in which the Austrasian lords disagreed on tactics. Grimoald and Adalgesil strengthened their position by defending Sigibert's interests, but could not establish a unanimous agreement. During their final assault, the 'men of Mainz' betrayed the Austrasians and joined with Radulf. This penultimate battle killed many important Austrasian lords, including Duke Bobo and Count Innowales, and resulted in Sigibert's defeat. The Continuations offers a famous description of Sigibert being 'seized with the wildest grief and sat there on his horse weeping unrestrainedly for those he had lost' as Radulf returned to his camp victorious.

Upon Sigibert's return from Unstruct, Grimoald, now mayor, began to build power for the Pippinid clan. He utilized the existing links between the family and ecclesiastical community to gain control over local holy men and women who, in turn, supported Pippinid assertions of power. Grimoald established links with Aquitanian and Columbianan missionaries Amandus and Remaclus, both of whom came to be influential bishops within the Merovingian court. Remaclus, in particular, was important as after becoming bishop of Maastricht, he established two monasteries: Stavelot Abbey and Malmedy. Under Grimoald's direction, the Arnulfings were also further established with Chlodulf of Metz, son of St. Arnulf, taking the bishopric of Metz in 656.

==== Grimoald and Childebert (656–657) ====
The final moment of Grimoald's life is an area that is disputed in both date and event, titled: 'Grimoald's coup'. It involves Grimoald and his son Childebert the Adopted taking the Austrasian throne from the true Merovingian King Dagobert II, son of the late Sigibert who died young at 26 years old. Historians like Pierre Riché are certain that Sigibert died in 656, having adopted Childebert due to his lack of an adult male heir. Following this, young Dagobert II was then exiled and tonsured by Grimoald and Dido of Poitiers, who then installed Childebert as King of Austrasia. Clovis II in Neustria, uncle to Dagobert, then reacted to the revolt and lured Grimoald and Childebert into Neustria, where they were executed.

This story is only confirmed by the pro-Neustrian source, the Liber Historia Francorum (LHF) and selected charter evidence. Other contemporary sources like the Continuations fail to mention the event and Carolingian sources like Annales Mettenses Priores (AMP) ignore the event and even deny Grimoald's existence. As such, historian Richard Gerberding has suggested a different chronology and reading of the LHF, which places Sigibert's death on 1 February 651. According to a Gerberding narrative, Grimoald and Dido organised Dagobert's exile around 16 January 651 to Ireland at Nivelles and then, when Sigibert died a month later, they acted out the plan and tonsured Dagobert, replacing him with Childebert, who ruled until 657. Clovis II then immediately acted and invaded Austrasia, executing Grimoald and his son.

Then, either in 657 or 662, the Neustrians (either Clovis II who died in 657 or his son Chlothar III) installed infant King Childeric II to the throne of Austrasia, marrying him to Bilichild, the daughter of Sigibert's widow Chimnechild of Burgundy. Grimoald and Childebert's deaths brought an end to the direct Pippinid line of the family, leaving the Arnulfing descendants from Begga and Ansegisel to continue the faction.

==== Pippin II (676–714) ====
Very little is known about Pippin's early life, but a controversial story from AMP suggests that Pippin reclaimed power in Austrasia by killing a legendary 'Gundoin' as revenge for the assassination of his father Ansegisel. This story is regarded as slightly fantastical by Paul Fouracre, who argues the AMP, a pro-Carolingian source potentially written by Giselle (Charlemagne's sister) in 805 at Chelles, is that Pippin's role primes him perfectly for his future and demonstrates his family to be 'natural leaders of Austrasia.' However, Fouracre does also acknowledge his existence in charter evidence and confirms that he was a political link to rival mayor Wulfoald. These rivalries would make Pippin natural enemies with Gundoin, making the murder plausible as part of Pippin's rise to power.

===== Rise to power =====
The Arnulfing clan reappear in the contemporary historical record in c. 676, when the LHF mentions 'Pippin and Martin' rising up against a tyrannical Ebroin, mayor of Austrasia. Pippin II, now head of the faction, and Martin, who was either Pippin's brother or relative, rose up against Ebroin and gathered an army (potentially with the aid of Dagobert II who had been brought back to Austrasia by mayor Wulfoald). According to the LHF, the Arnulfing army met Ebroin, who had gained the support of King Theuderic III, at Bois-du-Fays, and they were easily defeated. Martin fled to Laon, from where he was lured and murdered by Ebroin at Asfeld. Pippin fled to Austrasia and soon received Ermenfred, an officer of a royal fisc who had assassinated Ebroin.

The Neustrians, with Ebroin dead, installed Waratto as mayor, and he looked for peace with the Austrasians. Despite an exchange of hostages, Warrato's son Gistemar attacked Pippin at Namur and displaced his father. He died shortly thereafter and Warrato resumed his position, wherein peace was reached but tense relations remained until Warrato's death in 686. He left behind his wife Ansfled and his son Berchar, whom the Neustrians installed as mayor. Against his father's policy, Berchar did not maintain peace and incited Pippin into violence.

In 687, Pippin rallied an Austrasian army and led an assault on Neustria, facing Theuderic III and the Neustrian mayor, now Berchar, in combat. They met at the Battle of Tertry, where the AMP records that Pippin, after offering peace which was rejected by Theuderic at Berchar's behest, crossed the river Omignon at the break of dawn and attacked the Neustrians, who believed the battle won when they saw Pippin's camp abandoned. This surprise attack was successful and the Neustrians fled. Following this victory, Berchar was either killed, as the AMP argues, by his own people, but the LHF suggests that it is more likely that he was murdered by his mother-in-law, Ansfled. This moment was decisive in Arnulfing history as it was the first time that any of the faction had national control. Paul Fouracre even argues it is for this that the AMP starts with Pippin II, as a false dawn upon which Charles Martel would rebuild. However, historians have discredited the importance of this victory. Marios Costambeys, Matthew Innes and Simon MacLean all show that the Tertry victory did not establish solid authority over Neustria immediately, evidenced by the fact that Pippin immediately installed 'Norbert, one of his followers' (as written in the LHF) and then his son Grimoald in 696 to ensure continued influence.

===== Consolidation of power =====
Pippin II then became overall mayor of the royal palace under Theuderic II, becoming mayor of Austrasia, Neustria and Burgundy. His son Drogo, from his wife Plectrude, was also imbued with power when he married Berchar's widow Adaltrude (potentially maneuvered by Ansfled) and was made Duke of Champagne. Pippin was politically dominating and had the power to elect the next two Merovingian kings after Theuderic II died in 691; he installed King Clovis IV (691–695), Childebert III (695–711) and Dagobert III (711–715). Pippin moved to secure further power by consolidating his position in Neustria, installing several bishops like Gripho, Bishop of Rouen and Bainus at the Abbey of Saint Wandrille in 701, which was later owned along with Fleury Abbey (founded by Pippin in 703). Imbued with internal strength, Pippin also began to look outwards from the Frankish Empire to subdue the people, that the AMP records, who once were 'subjected to the Franks ... [such as] the Saxons, Frisians, Alemans, Bavarians, Aquitainians, Gascons and Britons.' Pippin defeated the pagan chieftain Radbod in Frisia, an area that had been slowly encroached upon by Austrasian nobles and Anglo-Saxon missionaries like Willibrord, whose links would later make him a connection between the Arnulfings and the papacy. Following Gotfrid, Duke of Alemannia in 709, Pippin also moved against the Alemans and subjugated them again to royal control.

===== Later years =====
As Pippin approached his death in late 714, he was faced with a succession crisis. Drogo, Pippin's oldest son, died in 707 and his second son Grimoald, according to the LHF, was killed whilst praying to Saint Lambert in Liège in 714 by Rantgar, suspected by Paul Fouracre to be a pagan. Pippin, before his death, made his six-year-old grandson Theudoald (Grimoald's son) his successor in Neustria, a choice that is believed to have been promoted by his wife Plectrude, which was a political choice from within the direct family line, as Pippin had two adult illegitimate children, Charles Martel and Childebrand I, from a second wife or concubine named Alpaida. They were ousted so Theudoald (with Plectrude's regency) could take the throne, a choice that would result in disaster.

===== Death =====
When Pippin II died in December 714, the Arnulfings' dominance over Francia disintegrated. The LHF tells us that 'Plectrude along with her grandchildren and the king directed all the affairs of state under a separate government', a system which created tensions with the Neustrians. Theudoald ruled uncontested for around six months, until June 715, when the Neustrians revolted. Theudoald and the Arnulfings' supporters met at the Battle of Compiègne on 26 September 715, and after a decisive victory, the Neustrians installed a new mayor Ragenfrid and, following Dagobert's death, their own Merovingian king Chilperic II. Charter evidence suggests that Chilperic was the son of the former King Childeric II, but this would make Daniel in his 40s, which is quite old to take the throne.

==== Charles Martel (714–741) ====
===== Rise to power =====
Following their victory, the Neustrians joined with Radbod, King of the Frisians and invaded Austrasia, aiming towards the Meuse river to take the heartland of the faction's support. It is at this moment that Charles Martel is first mentioned in historical records, which note him surviving imprisonment by his step-mother, Plectrude. Charles managed to escape and mustered an Austrasian army to face the encroaching Radbod and the Neustrians. In 716, Charles finally met the Frisians as they approached and, although the AMP attempts equalize the losses, it is confirmed from the descriptions in the LHF and the Continuations that Charles was defeated with heavy losses. Chilperic, Raganfred and, according to the Continuations, Radbod, then travelled from Neustria through the forest of the Ardennes and raided around the river Rhine and Cologne, taking treasure from Plectrude and her supporters. As they returned, Charles ambushed the returning party at the Battle of Amblève and was victorious, inflicting heavy losses on the Neustrian invaders.

In 717, Charles mustered his army again and marched on Neustria, taking the city of Verdun during his conquest. He met Chilperic and Raganfred again at the Battle of Vinchy on 21 March 717 and was once again victorious, forcing them back to Paris. He then swiftly returned to Austrasia and besieged Cologne, defeating Plectrude and reclaiming his father's wealth and treasure. Charles bolstered his position by installing the Merovingian king Chlothar IV in Austrasia as an opposing Merovingian to Chilperic II. Despite not having a Merovingian king for around 40 years in Austrasia, Charles' position was weak at this time and he required the support of the established Merovingians to gather military support. Despite his weaknesses, Charles' recent success had made him a greater political entity; as such, Chilperic and Raganfred could not win a decisive victory against him. So, in 718 they too sent embassies and won the support of Duke Eudo of Aquitaine who, at their request, mustered 'a Gascon army' to face Charles. In response, Charles brought an army to the eastern Neustrian borders and faced Duke Eudo in battle at Soissons. Duke Eudo, realising he was outmatched, retreated to Paris, where he took Chilperic and the royal treasury and left for Aquitaine. Charles pursued them, according to the Continuations, as far as Orleans, but Eudo and the Neustrians managed to escape. In 718, King Chlothar IV died and was not replaced; instead, Charles became the primary authority in Francia. He established a peace treaty with Duke Eudo that ensured Chilperic II was returned to Francia; thereafter, until Chilperic's death in 720 at Noyon, the kingship was restored with Carolingian control and Charles became the maior palatii in both Neustria and Austrasia. Following Chilperic II's death, the Merovingian king Theuderic IV, son of Dagobert III, was taken from Chelles Abbey and appointed by the Neustrians and Charles as the Frankish king.

===== Consolidation of power =====
With his ascension to the throne, several significant moments in Frankish history occurred. Firstly, the LHF ended, likely composed several years later in 727 and ended one of the several perspectives we have on Charles' ascension. Secondly, and more importantly, the Arnulfing predominance in the faction ended and the Carolingian (translating to 'sons of Charles') officially began.

Once the immediate dangers were dealt with, Charles then began to consolidate his position as sole mayor of the Frankish kingdom. The civil unrest between 714 and 721 had destroyed the continental political cohesion, and peripheral kingdoms like Aquitaine, Alemannia, Burgundy and Bavaria had slipped from the Carolingian's grasp. Even though the faction had, by Charles Martel's time, established strong political control over Francia, loyalty to the Merovingian power within these border regions remained.

====== Ending the Civil War ======
Charles first set out to reinstate Carolingian dominance internally within Francia: the Continuations lists Charles' continuous maneuvers which solidified the campaigns generating the Carolingian military foundation. In 718, the AMP records that Charles fought against the Saxons, pushing them as far as the river Weser and following up with subsequent campaigns in 720 and 724 which secured the northern borders of Austrasia and Neustria. He subdued his former enemy Raganfred at Angers in 724 and secured his patronage, removing the remaining political resistance that had continued to thrive in western Neustria.

====== East of the Rhine ======
In 725, Charles set out against the peripheral kingdoms, starting with Alemannia. The region had almost gained independence during the reign of Pippin II and under the leadership of Lantfrid, Duke of Alemannia, as (710–730) they acted without Frankish authority, issuing law codes like the Lex Alamannorum without Carolingian consultation. As recorded in the Alemannia source, the Breviary of Erchanbert, the Alemanni 'refused to obey the duces of the Franks because they were no longer able to serve the Merovingian kings. Therefore, each of them kept to himself.' This statement was true for more than just Alemannia and, just like in those regions, Charles brutally forced them into submission. Charles was successful in his first campaign, but returned in 730, the same year that Duke Lantfrid died and was succeeded by his brother Theudebald, Duke of Alamannia.

As successful as campaigning had been, Charles seemingly took inspiration from Anglo-Saxon missionary Saint Boniface, who in 719 was sent by Pope Gregory II to convert Germany, in particular the areas of Thuringia and Hesse, where he established the monasteries of Ohrdruf, Tauberbischofsheim, Kitzingen and Ochsenfurt. Charles, realising the potential of establishing Carolingian-supportive episcopal centres, utilised Saint Pirmin, an itinerant monk, to establish an ecclesiastical foundation on Reichenau Island in Lake Constance. He was expelled in 727 by Lantfrid and he retreated to Alsace, where he established monasteries with the support of the Etichonid clan, who were Carolingian supporters. This relationship gave the Carolingians long-term benefit from Pirmin's future achievements, which brought abbeys in the eastern provinces into Carolingian favour.

In 725, Charles continued his conquest from Alemannia and invaded Bavaria. Like Alemannia, Bavaria had continued to gain independence under the rule of the Agilolfings clan who, in recent years, had increased links with Lombardy and affirmed their own law codes, like the Lex Baiuvariorum. When Charles moved, the region was experiencing a power struggle between Grimoald of Bavaria and his nephew Hugbert, but when Grimoald died in 725, Hugbert gained the position and Charles reaffirmed their support. The Continuations records that when Charles left Bavaria, he took hostages, one of which was Swanachild, who later would become Charles' second wife. Paul Fouracre believes this marriage could have been intentionally forced, based upon the fact that Swanchild's heritage related her both to Alemannia and Bavaria. Not only would their marriage have allowed greater control over both regions, but it also would have cut the existing family ties that the Agilofings had to the Pippinid family branch. Plectrude's sister Regintrud was married to Theodo of Bavaria, and this relation provided an opportunity for disenfranchised family members to defect.

====== Aquitaine, Burgundy and Provence ======
Following his conquest east of the Rhine, Charles had the opportunity to assert his dominance over Aquitaine and began committing military resources and performing raids in 731. However, before he could make any major movements, Aquitaine was invaded by Umayyad warlord Abd al-Rahman I. Following Abd al-Rahman's ascension in Spain in 731, another local Berber lord Munuza revolted, set himself up at Cerdanya and forged defensive alliances with the Franks and Aquitainians through a marriage to Eudo's daughter. Abd ar-Rahman then besieged Cerdanya and forced Munuza into retreat into France, at which point he continued his advance into Aquitaine, moving as far as Tours before he was met by Charles Martel. Carolingian sources attest that Duke Eudo begged Charles for assistance, but Ian N. Wood claims these embassies have been invented by later pro-Carolingian annalists. Eudo was a main protagonist in the Battle of Toulouse (721), which famously stopped Muslim lord Al-Samh ibn Malik al-Khawlani's advances in Narbonne and gained Eudo praise in the Liber Pontificalis.

Charles met the Muslim force at the famous Battle of Poitiers (732) and came out victorious. This moment cemented Charles Martel in historical records and gained him international praise. Bede, writing at the same time in Jarrow, England, recorded the event in his Ecclesiastical History of the English People, and his victory gained Charles Martel the admiration of seminal historian Edward Gibbon who considered him the Christian saviour of Europe. Although his victory was considered famous, in reality his victory was far less impactful, and Charles would not gain much control in Aquitaine until Eudo's death in 735. The victory may have given the Carolingians relative local support that potentially allowed Charles to assert dominance over Eudo's son and successor Hunald of Aquitaine, but records of continued hostilities in 736 only further cemented that relations were strained.

With a stronger establishment in Aquitaine, Charles made moves to assert his dominance into Burgundy. The region, at least in the Northern areas, had remained controlled and allied with Frankish interest. Influential nobility like Savaric of Auxerre, who had maintained near-autonomy and led military forces against Burgundian towns like Orléans, Nevers and Troyes, even dying whilst besieging Lyon, were the key to Charles' support. As such, Charles made multiple attempts to both gain the faction's support and remove their authority. When Savaric died during Charles' early reign, he agreed to support Savaric's nephew Bishop Eucherius of Orléans' claim to the bishopric. However, once Charles had established a powerful basis by 737, he exiled Eucherius, with the help of a man called Chrodobert, to the monastery of St Trond. Charles took further military action in the same year to fully assert his authority, and installed his sons Pippin and Remigius as magnates. This was followed by the installation of political supporters from Bavaria and local supporters like Theuderic of Autun and Adalhard of Chalon.

This acquisition of land in southern France was supported by the increased social chaos that seemingly developed during the Civil War years. This was most apparent in Provence, where local magnates, like Abbo of Provence, were incredibly supportive of Charles' attempts to reinstate Frankish power. In 739, he used his power in Burgundy and Aquitaine to lead an attack with his brother Childebrand I against Arab invaders and Duke Maurontus, who had been claiming independence and allying himself with Muslim emir Abd ar-Rahman. It is likely due to Childebrand's sponsorship of the manuscript that his involvement is so extensively recorded in the Continuations. According to the manuscript, Childebrand and Charles noticed the Arab army, with Maurontus' welcome, entering Avignon and quickly moved against the alliance. They besieged the city and claimed victory; the Franks then made the decision to invade Septimania, taking Narbonne and flanking the Arab army. The Franks then fought off a support army sent from Spain under Omar-ibn Chaled at the River Berre. From there the Franks then pursued the retreating Arabs and ravaged the cities of Nîmes, Agde and Béziers before returning to Francia. Later that year, Charles and Childebrand returned to Provence, likely collecting more forces, and then forcing the rebellious Maurontus into 'impenetrable rocky fastnesses out to sea.' Paul the Deacon later records in his Historia Langobardorum Maurontus received help from the Lombards, and his Arab allies then fled. At this time, Charles then assumed control of the region and, judging from Charter evidence, appointed Abbo of Provence as patricius (Patrician) in the region.

===== Ruling Francia =====
Charles also ruled the Frankish realm, although the majority of his policies were centred upon his conquests and his military ventures. In 19th century historiography, historians like Heinrich Brunner even centred their arguments around Charles' necessity for military resources, in particular the development of mounted warrior or cavalry that would peak in the High Middle Ages. However, in modern historiography, historians like Pierre Riche and Paul Fouracre have discredited his ideas as too simplistic and have aimed to depict more realistic fragments of development that may or not have been interdependent. This was the period in which the Carolingians first began to establish themselves as fully independent from the Merovingian royalty.

====== Vassalage and Church ======
Charles Martel has become notorious in historiography for his role in the development of the concept of feudalism. The debates are rooted in the arguments of historians like François-Louis Ganshof, who viewed Charles' reign as the birth of the 'feudal' relationship between power and property. This results from the increased use of precaria or temporary land grants by the Carolingians, who allocated and spread their power to their subordinates. Ganshof's arguments connect these ties to a military-tenure relationship; however, this is never represented in primary material, and instead is only implied, and likely derived from, an understanding of 'feudalism' in the High Middle Ages. Recent historians like Paul Fouracre have criticised Ganshof's review for being too simplistic, and in reality, even though these systems of vassalage did exist between lord and populace, they were not as standardised as older historiography has suggested. For example, Fouracre has drawn particular attention to the incentives that drew lords and warriors into the Carolingian armies, arguing that the primary draw was 'booty' and treasure gained from conquest rather than 'feudal' obligation.

Although Charles' reign is no longer considered transitional in its feudal developments, it is seen as a transitional period in the spread of the existing system of vassals and precaria land rights. Due to Charles' continued military and missionary work, the political systems that existed in the heartlands, Austrasia and Neustria, officially began to spread to the periphery. Those whom Charles appointed as new nobility in these regions, often with lifetime tenures, ensured that Carolingian loyalties and systems was maintained across the kingdoms. The Carolingians were also far more strict with their land rights and tenure than their Merovingian predecessors, carefully distributing their new land to new families temporarily, but maintaining their control. Merovingians kings weakened themselves by allocating too much of their royal domains to supporting factions; the Carolingians themselves seemingly became increasingly powerful due to their generosity. By giving away their land, the Merovingians allowed themselves to become figureheads and the 'do nothing kings' that Einhard prefaced in the Vita Karoli Magni.

Due to his vast military conquests, Charles often reallocated existing land settlements, including Church property, to new tenants. Ecclesiastical property and monasteries in the late Merovingian and Carolingian period were political centres and often closely related to the royal court; as such they often became involved in political matters, which often overlapped with Charles' reallocation of land. This 'secularisation' of Church property caused serious tension between the Carolingian church and state, and often gave Charles a negative depiction in ecclastical sources. The reallocation of church land was not new by Charles' reign; Ian Wood has managed to identify the practice going back to the reigns of Dagobert I (629–639) and Clovis II (639–657). The majority of the sources that depict Charles' involvement in Church land rights come from the 9th century, and are therefore less reliable, but two supposedly contemporary sources also identify this issue. The first, a letter sent by missionary Saint Boniface to Anglo-Saxon king Æthelbald of Mercia, called Charles' a 'destroyer of many monasteries, and embezzler of Church revenues for his own use...', condemning him for his use of Church property. This is supported by the second source, the Contintuations, which related that, in 733 in Burgundy, Charles split the Lyonnais between his followers, this likely including Church land. Further chronicles like the Gesta episcoporum Autissiodorensium and the Gesta Sanctorum Patrum Fontanellensis Coenobii recorded monasteries losing substantial land. The monastery at Auxerre was reduced to a hundred mansus by Pippin III's reign, and at the Abbey of Saint Wandrille under Abbot Teutsind, who was appointed by Charles in 735/6, the Church's local property was reduced to a third its size. Wood has also criticised this point and proven that the loss of land by the Church was in reality very small, the remaining land being simply leased as it went beyond the Church's capabilities. Regardless, it is apparent that Charles' expansion of control consumed plenty of reallocated properties, many of which were ecclesiastical domains.

===== Interregnum, death and divisions =====
When King Theuderic IV died in 737, Charles did not install a Merovingian successor. Unlike his Carolingian predecessors, Charles was strong enough by the end of his reign to not rely on Merovingian loyalties. He had created his own power bloc through the vassals he installed in Frankish heartlands and peripheral states. Even prior to Theuderic's death, Charles did act with complete sovereignty in Austrasia. It was only in areas like Neustria, where Carolingian opposition historically existed, that Charles knew he would face criticism if he usurped the throne.

Therefore, until his death, Charles ruled as Princeps or First Man/First Citizen, officially gaining the title with his uncontested leadership with the acquisition of Provence in 737. This meant that the issue of kingship remained ever present for his successors who would have to work further to establish themselves as royal.

When Charles died in 741, he was buried at St Denis in Paris. He made secure succession plans, likely learning from his father, that ensured Francia was effectively divided between his sons, Carloman and Pippin as maior palatii. According to the Continuations, the eldest son, Carloman, was given control of the eastern kingdoms in Austrasia, Alammania and Thuringia, while Pippin was given the western kingdoms in Burgundy, Neustria and Provence.

==== Charlemagne ====
A map showing Charlemagne's additions (in light green) to the Frankish Kingdom

The greatest Carolingian monarch was Charlemagne, Pepin's son. Charlemagne was crowned Emperor by Pope Leo III at Rome in 800. His empire, ostensibly a continuation of the Western Roman Empire, is referred to historiographically as the Carolingian Empire.

The Carolingian rulers did not give up the traditional Frankish (and Merovingian) practice of dividing inheritances among heirs, though the concept of the indivisibility of the Empire was also accepted. The Carolingians had the practice of making their sons minor kings in the various regions (regna) of the Empire, which they would inherit on the death of their father, which Charlemagne and his son Louis the Pious both did for their sons. Following the death of the Emperor Louis the Pious in 840, his surviving adult sons, Lothair I and Louis the German, along with their adolescent brother Charles the Bald, fought a three-year civil war ending only with the Treaty of Verdun in 843, which divided the empire into three regna while according imperial status and a nominal lordship to Lothair who, at 48, was the eldest. The Carolingians differed markedly from the Merovingians in that they disallowed inheritance to illegitimate offspring, possibly in an effort to prevent infighting among heirs and assure a limit to the division of the realm. In the late ninth century, however, the lack of suitable adults among the Carolingians necessitated the rise of Arnulf of Carinthia as the king of East Francia, a bastard child of a legitimate Carolingian king, Carloman of Bavaria, himself a son of the First King of the Eastern division of the Frankish kingdom, Louis the German.

=== Decline ===
It was after Charlemagne's death that the dynasty began slowly to crumble. His kingdom was split into three parts, each being ruled over by one of his grandsons. Only the kingdoms of the eastern and western portions survived, becoming the predecessors of modern Germany and France. The Carolingians were displaced in most of the regna of the Empire by 888. They ruled in East Francia until 911 and held the throne of West Francia intermittently until 987. Carolingian cadet branches continued to rule in Vermandois and Lower Lorraine after the last king died in 987, but they never sought the royal or imperial thrones and made peace with the new ruling families. One chronicler of Sens dates the end of Carolingian rule with the coronation of Robert II of France as junior co-ruler with his father, Hugh Capet, thus beginning the Capetian dynasty.

== Genealogy ==
Carolingians and their relatives, with the names of kings bolded

Arnulf of Metz	Pepin the Elder	Itta of Metz
Chlodulf	Ansegisel	Begga	Gertrude of Nivelles	Grimoald the Elder
Pepin the Middle	Martin	**Childebert the Adopted**	Vulfetrude
Drogo of Champagne	Grimoald the Younger	Charles Martel	Childebrand I
Hugh of Rouen	Theudoald	Carloman	**Pepin the Younger**	Grifo	Hiltrud	Bernard	Nibelung I
Gisela of Chelles	**Charlemagne**	Carloman I
Pepin the Hunchback	**Pepin of Italy**	Bertha	**Charles the Younger**	Rotrude	**Louis the Pious**	Hugh	Drogo of Metz
**Bernard of Italy**	Nithard	**Lothar I**	**Pepin I of Aquitaine**	Arnulf of Sens	**Louis the German**	**Charles the Bald**	Gisela
**Louis II of Italy**	**Lothar II**	**Charles of Provence**	**Pepin II of Aquitaine**	Charles	**Carloman of Bavaria**	**Louis the Younger**	**Charles the Fat**	**Louis the Stammerer**	**Charles the Child**	Judith of Flanders	Carloman	**Berengar I of Italy**
Ermengard of Italy	Hugh of Alsace	Bertha	**Arnulf of Carinthia**	**Louis III of France**	**Carloman II of France**	**Charles the Simple**	Gisela of Friuli
**Louis the Blind**	**Hugh of Italy**	**Zwentibold**	**Louis the Child**	**Louis IV of France**	**Berengar II of Italy**
**Lothar II of Italy**	**Lothar II of France**	Charles of Lower Lorraine	**Adalbert of Italy**
Arnulf of Reims	**Louis V of France**	Otto of Lower Lorraine

=== Complete male-line family tree ===
List of male-line members of the Carolingian dynasty

Male, male-line, legitimate, members of the house who either lived to adulthood, or who held a title as a child, are included. Heads of the house are in bold.

- Arnulf of Metz, c. 582-645
  - Chlodulf of Metz, c. 605-697
  - Ansegisel, c. 602/610 - 662/679
    - Pepin of Herstal, c. 635-714
      - Drogo of Champagne, c. 675-708
        - Arnulf of Champagne, fl. 707-723
        - Hugh of Rouen, d. 730
        - Gotfrid
        - Pippin
      - Grimoald the Younger, d. 714
      - Childebrand I, c. 678 - 743/751
      - Charles Martel, c. 688-741
        - Carloman, 706/716 - 754
          - Drogo, b. c. 730
        - Pepin the Short, c. 714-768
          - Charlemagne, 748-814
            - Pepin the Hunchback, 768/769 - 811
            - Charles the Younger, c. 772-811
            - Pepin of Italy, 777-810
            - Louis the Pious, 778-840
              - Lothair I, 795-855
                - Louis II of Italy, 825-875
                - Lothair II, 835-869
                - Charles of Provence, 845-863
              - Pepin I of Aquitaine, 797-838
                - Pepin II of Aquitaine, 823-864
                - Charles (archbishop of Mainz), 825/830 - 863
              - Louis the German, c. 806/810 - 876
                - Carloman of Bavaria, c. 830-880
                - Louis the Younger, 830/835 - 882
                - Charles the Fat, 839-888
              - Charles the Bald, 823-877
                - Louis the Stammerer, 846-879
                  - Louis III of France, 863/865 - 882
                  - Carloman II, c. 866-884
                  - Charles the Simple, 879-929
                    - Louis IV of France, 920/921 - 954
                      - Lothair of France, 941-986
                        - Louis V of France, 966/967 - 987
                      - Charles, Duke of Lower Lorraine, 953 - 992/995
                        - Otto, Duke of Lower Lorraine, c. 970-1012
                        - Louis of Lower Lorraine, 975/980 - 1023
                - Charles the Child, 847/848 - 866
                - Lothair the Lame, c. 848-865
                - Carloman, 848 - c. 877
          - Carloman I, 751-771
        - Grifo, c. 726-753

== Grand strategy ==
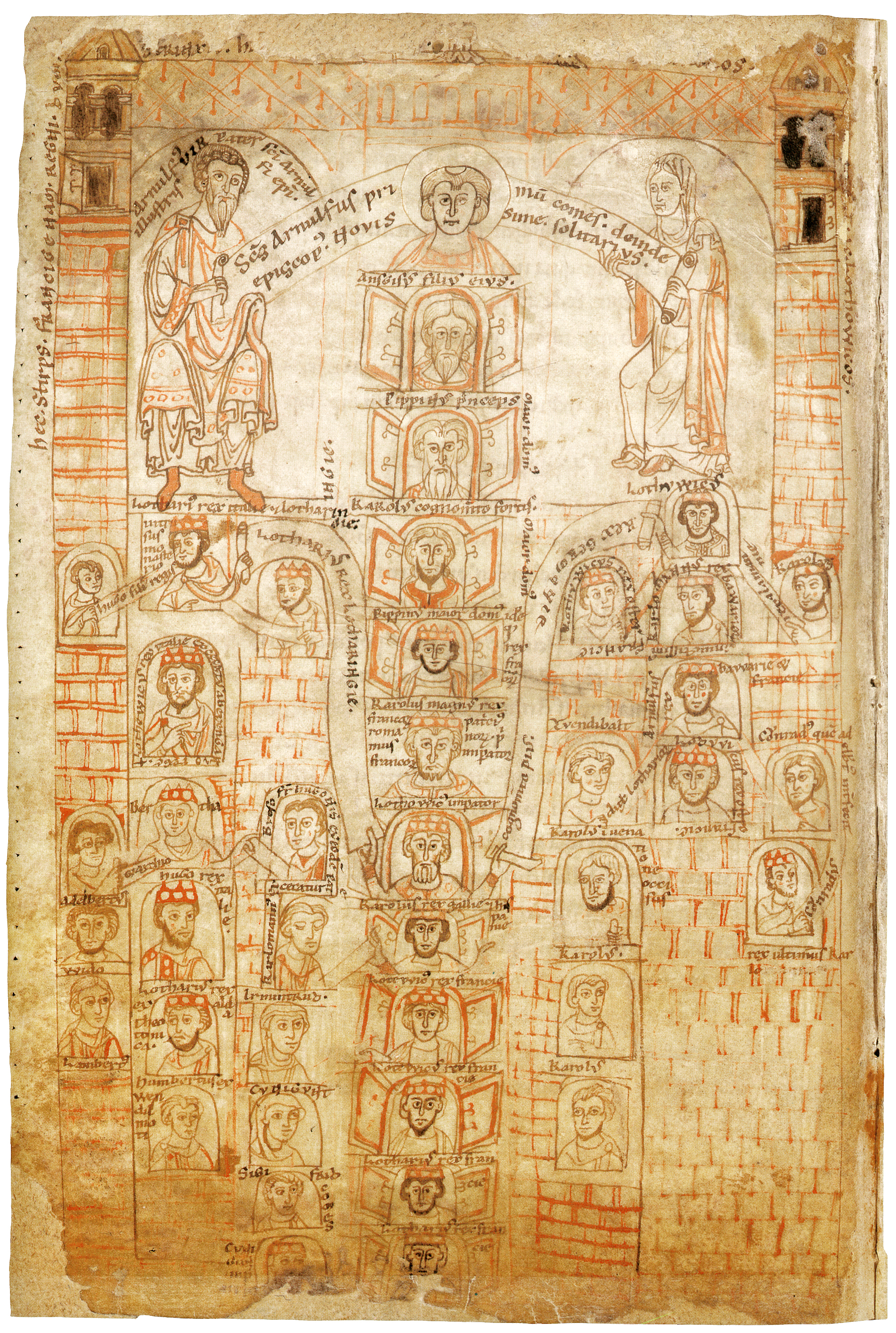
Carolingian family tree, from the Chronicon Universale of Ekkehard of Aura, 12th century

The historian Bernard Bachrach argues that the rise of the Carolingians to power is best understood using the theory of a Carolingian grand strategy. A grand strategy is a long term military and political strategy that lasts for longer than a typical campaigning season, and can span long periods of time. The Carolingians followed a set course of action that discounts the idea of a random rise in power and can be considered as a grand strategy. Another major part of the grand strategy of the early Carolingians encompassed their political alliance with the aristocracy. This political relationship gave the Carolingians authority and power in the Frankish kingdom.

Beginning with Pippin II, the Carolingians set out to put the regnum Francorum ("kingdom of the Franks") back together, after its fragmentation after the death of Dagobert I, a Merovingian king. After an early failed attempt in c. 651 to usurp the throne from the Merovingians, the early Carolingians began to slowly gain power and influence as they consolidated military power as mayors of the palace. In order to do this, the Carolingians used a combination of Late Roman military organization along with the incremental changes that occurred between the fifth and eighth centuries. Because of the defensive strategy the Romans had implemented during the Late Empire, the population had become militarized and were thus available for military use. The existence of the remaining Roman infrastructure that could be used for military purposes, such as roads, strongholds and fortified cities meant that the reformed strategies of the Late Romans would still be relevant. Civilian men who lived either in or near a walled city or strong point were required to learn how to fight and defend the areas in which they lived. These men were rarely used in the course of Carolingian grand strategy because they were used for defensive purposes, and the Carolingians were for the most part on the offensive most of the time.

Another class of civilians were required to serve in the military which included going on campaigns. Depending on one's wealth, one would be required to render different sorts of service, and "the richer the man was, the greater was his military obligation for service". For example, if rich, one might be required as a knight. Or one might be required to provide a number of fighting men.

In addition to those who owed military service for the lands they had, there were also professional soldiers who fought for the Carolingians. If the holder of a certain amount of land was ineligible for military service (women, old men, sickly men or cowards) they would still owe military service. Instead of going themselves, they would hire a soldier to fight in their place. Institutions, such as monasteries or churches were also required to send soldiers to fight based on the wealth and the amount of lands they held. In fact, the use of ecclesiastical institutions for their resources for the military was a tradition that the Carolingians continued and greatly benefitted from.

It was "highly unlikely that armies of many more than a hundred thousand effectives with their support systems could be supplied in the field in a single theatre of operation." Because of this, each landholder would not be required to mobilize all of his men each year for the campaigning season, but instead, the Carolingians would decide which kinds of troops were needed from each landholder, and what they should bring with them. In some cases, sending men to fight could be substituted for different types of war machines. In order to send effective fighting men, many institutions would have well trained soldiers that were skilled in fighting as heavily armored troops. These men would be trained, armored, and given the things they needed in order to fight as heavy troops at the expense of the household or institution for whom they fought. These armed retinues served almost as private armies, "which were supported at the expense of the great magnates, [and] were of considerable importance to early Carolingian military organization and warfare." The Carolingians themselves supported their own military household and they were the most important "core of the standing army in the" regnum Francorum.

It was by utilizing the organization of the military in an effective manner that contributed to the success of the Carolingians in their grand strategy. This strategy consisted of strictly adhering to the reconstruction of the regnum Francorum under their authority. Bernard Bachrach gives three principles for Carolingian long-term strategy that spanned generations of Carolingian rulers:

The first principle… was to move cautiously outward from the Carolingian base in Austrasia. Its second principle was to engage in a single region at a time until the conquest had been accomplished. The third principle was to avoid becoming involved beyond the frontiers of the regnum Francorum or to do so when absolutely necessary and then not for the purpose of conquest".

This is important to the development of medieval history because without such a military organization and without a grand strategy, the Carolingians would not have successfully become kings of the Franks, as legitimized by the bishop of Rome. Furthermore, it was ultimately because of their efforts and infrastructure that Charlemagne was able to become such a powerful king and be crowned Emperor of the Romans in 800. Without the efforts of his predecessors, he would not have been as successful as he was and the revival of the Roman Empire in the West was likely to have not occurred.

== See also ==
- Phantom time conspiracy theory
- East Francia
- West Francia
- Carolingian architecture
- Royal Administration of Merovingian and Carolingian Dynasties
- Carolingian art
- Carolingian minuscule
- Carolingian Renaissance
- Carolingian church
- List of counts of Vermandois
- King of Italy
- List of: Frankish Kings and French monarchs
  - Kings of France family tree
- List of Holy Roman Emperors and German monarchs
  - German monarchs family tree

- French monarchs family tree.
