= Battle of Lucofao =

679 battle

The Battle of Lucofao (or Bois-du-Fays) was the decisive engagement of the civil war that afflicted the Frankish kingdoms during and after the reign of Dagobert II (676–79). In the battle, the Neustrian forces of Theuderic III and his majordomo Ebroin defeated the forces of Austrasia under the dukes Pippin and Martin.

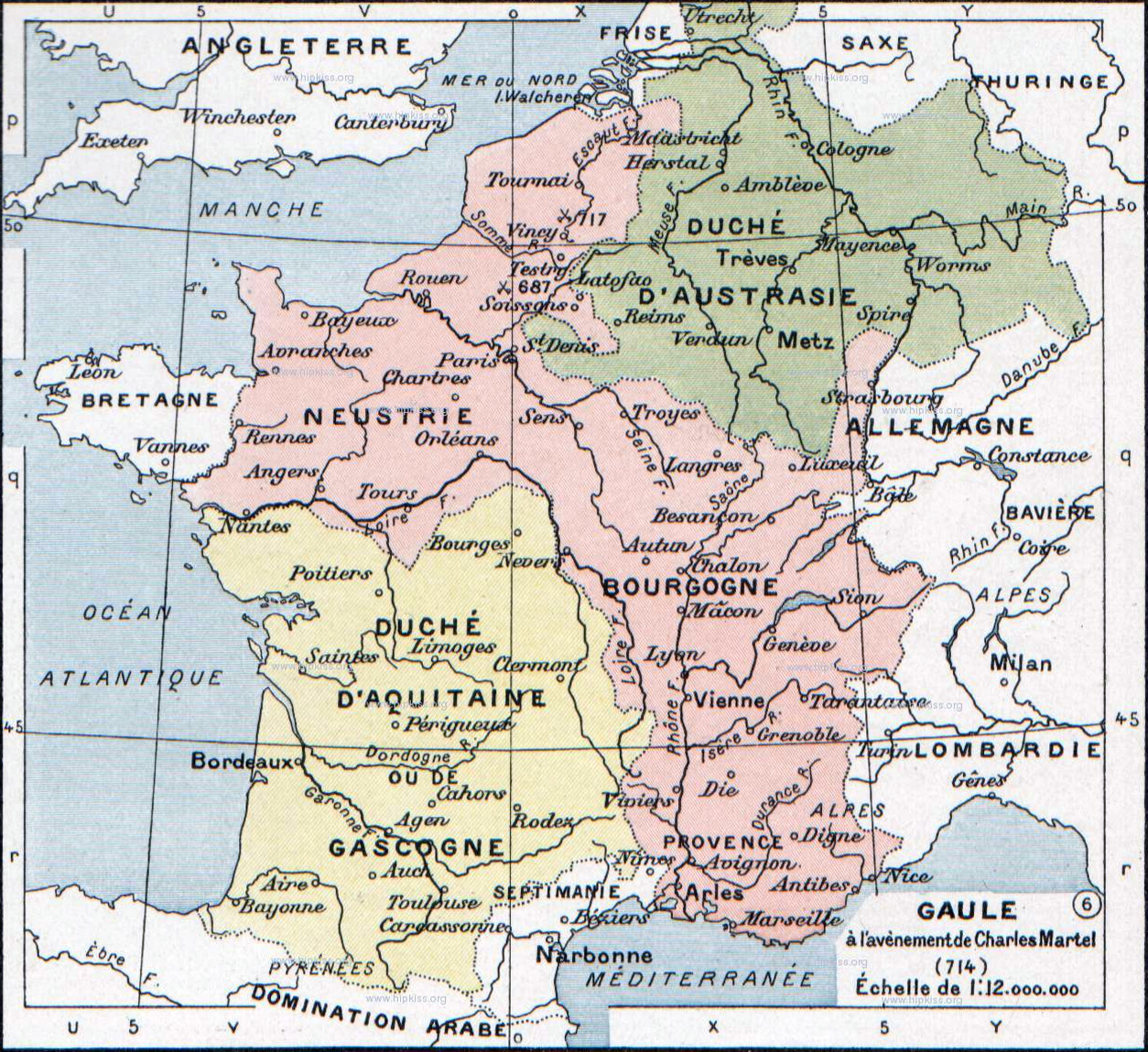
Map of the Frankish kingdoms showing location of Latofao (Lucofao) not far from the site of Tertry, just inside the border of Neustria.

== Background ==
A Neustrian war of succession broke out in 673 after the death of King Chlothar III. The mayor of the palace, Ebroin, enthroned the puppet-king Theuderic III, but the Neustrian aristocrats revolted against Ebroin and offered the crowns of Neustria and Burgundy to King Childeric II of Austrasia. The latter seized the kingdoms the same year and captured both Ebroin and Theuderic, thus briefly reuniting the entire Frankish Kingdom. Childeric promised the Neustrian magnates that he would not appoint officials from outside their kingdom, but he reneged and appointed Wulfoald as mayor over the whole realm. He and his wife Bilichild were assassinated in 675 by dissident Neustrians and a civil war erupted. Dagobert II returned from exile and was recognized in Austrasia in 676. That same year, Ebroin escaped his confinement, killed the Neustrian mayor Leudesius and once again enthroned Theuderic III.

== Date and place ==
The exact date of the battle is undetermined. It took place after the death of Childeric II in 675 and before the death of Ebroin in 680. Traditionally, it is thought to have been fought in early 680, after the death of Dagobert II, who died in late 679 (on December 23 according to later martyrologies), and before the death of Ebroin, who was probably dead by May 15. The chronological indication is the same in both of the primary sources, the Liber Historiae Francorum and the continuation of the Chronicle of Fredegar: the battle took place "after the death of Wulfoald and the disappearance of the kings". The date of Wulfoald's death and the identity of the deceased kings, however, are uncertain and scholars have reached different conclusions. If Childeric II and Chlothar III (673) are meant, as seems more likely, then the battle took place during the reign of Dagobert II in Austrasia. If, on the other hand, Childeric II and Dagobert II are the kings referred to, then the traditional date is accurate. Paul Fouracre and Richard Gerberding propose a date of September 679, shortly before Dagobert's assassination.

The location of the battle, Lucofao or Locofao, is now part of Sévigny-Waleppe, not far from Rethel, in the Ardennes. The name—in French Bois-du-Fays—comes from Latin lucus fagus, beech grove. The toponym Latofao, from latus fagus, beech space, is closely related.

== Battle ==
Both the Chronicle of Fredegar and the Liber Historiae Francorum leave no doubt that the battle was a very large encounter for its time. It was the first piece of serious fighting between Franks since the civil war of Brunhild (d. 613) and Chlothar II (d. 629) three generations earlier.

The Austrasians under Pippin and Martin initiated the conflict, "stirred up war against King Theuderic" in the words of Fredegar. The language of the Liber Historiae Francorum suggests that there army was composed primarily of levies. This increases the likelihood that the battle took place while Dagobert II was alive, given the importance of a legitimate Merovingian king for raising armies. In this instance, Pippin and Martin's army was in fact fighting in the name (and probably presence) of Dagobert II.

Despite the fact that they had initiated the war, Pippin and Martin were defeated by their Neustrian counterpart, Ebroin, who followed up his victory by laying waste the entire region. Pippin and Martin fled, the latter taking refuge in Laon, from which he was lured out by Ebroin with false assurances. He came to the villa of Ecry (now Asfeld) for what he evidently believed would be negotiations, but he and his supporters were killed.

== Primary sources ==
Liber Historiae Francorum, chapter 46
In that time, Wulfoald of Austrasia having died and the kings having died, Martin and the younger Pippin, son of the late Ansegisel, governed in Austrasia until finally it came to the point where these dukes turned in hatred against Ebroin. Having gathered a large following of Austrasians, they sent the force against King Theuderic and Ebroin. Theuderic and Ebroin came out against them with an army at a place called Bois-du-Fays, and as soon as they joined battle they cut each other down in a great slaughter. And there a great multitude of the army fell. The Austrasians were defeated and turned their backs in flight. Ebroin hunted them down with cruel slaughter and laid most of that region to waste. Martin, escaping by flight, entered Laon and shut himself up there; Pippin, however, fled in the other direction. Ebroin, therefore, having achieved his victory, returned. Coming with his army to the villa of Asfeld, he sent envoys to Martin so that with pledges having been given and with a guarantee he [Martin] might come to King Theuderic. This they [the envoys] craftily and falsely swore to him [Martin] on empty [relic] boxes. But he trusted them and came to Asfeld, where he was killed along with his companions.

Continuations of the Chronicle of Fredegar, chapter 3
After the death of Wulfoald and the disappearance of the kings, Duke Martin and Pippin, son of the deceased Ansegisel, a Frank of noble stock, ruled over Austrasia. But these two rulers, Martin and Pippin, fell out with Ebroin. They stirred up war against King Theuderic, and they led their force to a place called Bois-du-Fays, where they fought. Most of the followers of both sides were engaged in what proved to be a great battle. Martin and Pippin and their supporters were beaten and put to flight. Ebroin followed them up and laid waste most of that region. Martin thereupon entered Laon, barricading himself within the city walls. But Ebroin was behind him, and when he reached the villa of Ecry, he sent Aglibert and Bishop Reolus of Rheims as his representatives to Laon, where they gave undertakings but swore falsely upon reliquaries that, unknown to him, were empty. Yet Martin trusted them over this and left Laon with his friends and supporters to go to Ecry. And there, with all his companions they killed him.

== Aftermath ==
Ebroin did not enjoy his victory for long. He was assassinated soon after in 680 or 681. His victory, however, left Neustria in a dominant position and allowed Theuderic III to reunify the kingdoms. During a subsequent civil war in or about 684, the Neustrians operated deep in Austrasian territory in Namur. In hindsight, the battle of Lucofao appears as a major setback in the rise of Pippin and his family, the Pippinids, to a place of preeminence in the Frankish kingdoms. Nevertheless, Pippin recovered his power in Austrasia in subsequent years, defeated the Neustrian mayor Berchar in the battle of Tertry (687) and reunited Francia under the nominal rule of Theuderic III. The Liber Historiae Francorum, which was written in 727 from a Neustrian perspective, gives greater prominence to the Neustrian victory at Lucofao than to the Austrasian victory at the battle of Tertry (687). The Annales Mettenses Priores, written as a piece of Carolingian (Pippinid) propaganda, does not even mention the battle.

== Bibliography ==
- Bachrach, Bernard S. (2001). Early Carolingian Warfare: Prelude to Empire. University of Pennsylvania Press.
- Fouracre, Paul J. (1981). The Career of Ebroin, Mayor of the Palace, c.657–680 (PhD diss.). University of London, King's College.
- Fouracre, Paul J.; Gerberding, Richard A., eds. (1996). Late Merovingian France: History and Hagiography, 640–720. Manchester University Press.
- Geary, Patrick J. (1988). Before France and Germany: The Creation and Transformation of the Merovingian World. Oxford University Press.
- Gerberding, Richard A. (1983). A Critical Study of the Liber historiae Francorum (PhD diss.). Oxford University.
- Gerberding, Richard A. (1987). The Rise of the Carolingians and the Liber Historiae Francorum. Oxford University Press.
- James, Edward (1982). The Origins of France: From Clovis to the Capetians, 500–1000. Palgrave Macmillan.
- Lusse, Jackie (1992). Naissance d'une cité: Laon et le Laonnois du V^{e} au X^{e} siècle. Presses universitaires de Nancy.
- Nègre, Ernest (1987). "Toponymie du hêtre en France". Nouvelle revue d'onomastique. 9 (9–10): 19–25. doi:10.3406/onoma.1987.959.
- Wallace-Hadrill, J. M., ed. (1960). The Fourth Book of the Chronicle of Fredegar with its Continuations. Thomas Nelson and Sons.
- Wood, Ian N. (1994). The Merovingian Kingdoms, 450–751. Longman.
