= Rieul of Reims =

Bishop of Reims, France (673-~689)

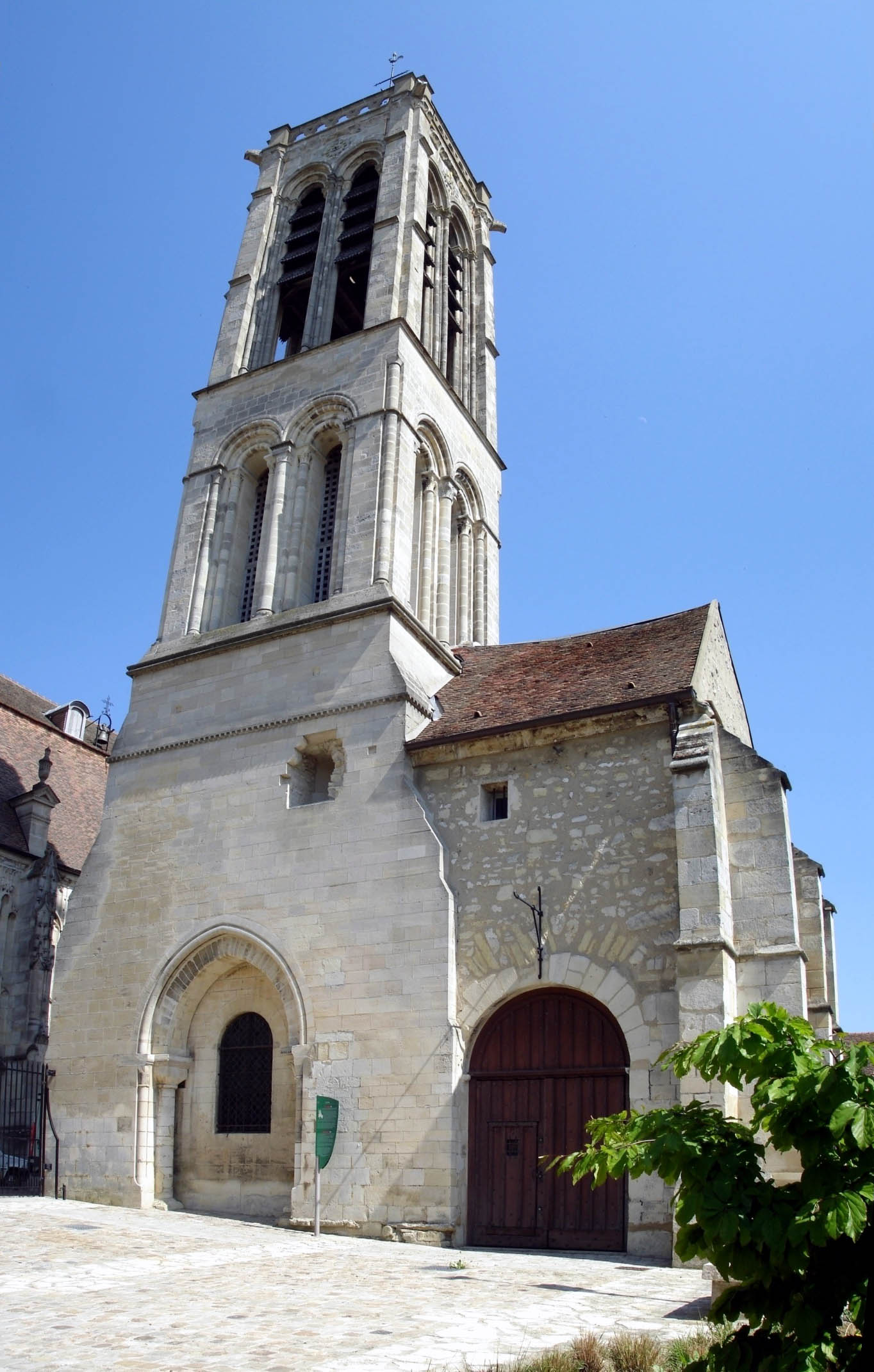
Tour Saint-Rieul, Louvres, Val-d'Oise

Rieul, Bishop of Reims, was bishop of that town from 673 to around 689. He was a supporter of Ebroin.

Ebroin's supporters, which included Rieul, Praejectus, Agilbert of Paris, and Ouen of Rouen, held a council of bishops that sat in judgment on Leger, at Marly, near Paris. Praejectus’ murderer may have been a supporter of Leger, who was later murdered on October 2, 679.

== False oaths ==
After their defeat at the Battle of Lucofao in late 679 or early 680, Austrasian Dukes Martin and Pepin of Herstal fled the battlefield. Martin went to Laon. Bishop Rieul and one Agilbert lured him to Ecry on the pretext of negotiations with King Theuderic III, giving false assurances, by swearing upon reliquaries that Martin did not know were empty. Trusting them, Martin went to Ecry where he and his supporters were killed.

Catholic Church titles
Preceded by Nivard	Bishop of Rheims; 673–689	Succeeded by Rigobert
