= Gundoinings =

Aristocratic kin-group in the Frankish kingdoms, 7th–8th centuries

The Gundoinings (also known as the Faronids, or more precisely the south-west Austrasian branch of the Faronid family) were an aristocratic kin-group active in the Frankish kingdoms during the seventh and early eighth centuries. The name "Gundoinings" is a modern historiographical label rather than one used by contemporaries.

== Background and terminology ==
The Gundoinings belong to a type of large, loosely structured cognatic family group that historians sometimes refer to by the German term Sippe (clan). Other prominent examples of such groups in the later Merovingian period include the Agilolfings and the Pippinids. As the medieval historian Paul Fouracre has noted, most such family names and group identities are assigned by modern historians rather than expressed by contemporaries themselves; the Faronids/Gundoinings are such a group, though in their case there is evidence of a distinguishing characteristic: persistent rivalry with the Pippinids.

== History ==
=== Rise under Chlothar II ===
The family rose to particular prominence after Chlothar II's unification of the Frankish kingdoms in 613. Despite the support given to Chlothar by Pippin of Landen and Arnulf of Metz, the king appointed a man named Rado — probably a Faronid — as mayor of the palace in Austrasia rather than Pippin. The family were well-placed to serve Chlothar as a link between his three kingdoms, holding land and power in the area where Burgundy, Neustria and Austrasia met. Members of the family remained prominent throughout the seventh century; Audoin (Dado), bishop of Rouen, an acclaimed holy man of the later seventh century, was connected to them. The Agilolfings, who were related to the Faronids and dominated southern Austrasia alongside them, appear to have been jointly used by Merovingian kings as a counterweight to the rising Pippinids.

=== Duke Gundoin and the Pippinid rivalry ===
The most historically documented member of the family is Duke Gundoin, who was active in Alsace and the middle Moselle region in the 660s–670s. In 669/70, King Childeric II ordered Gundoin and a domesticus named Hodo to measure off and retain for royal use half of the forest land around Stavelot-Malmedy that Sigebert III had previously granted to the monastery — a sign of activity in an area the Pippinids regarded as their sphere of influence. Gundoin, Hodo, and Wulfoald (mayor of the palace under Childeric II) are identified through Wissembourg charter evidence as allies and relatives.

According to the Annales Mettenses Priores, Gundoin also killed Ansegisel, the father of Pippin II; when Pippin grew up he hunted Gundoin down and killed him along with his followers. The historian of the Lombards Paul the Deacon also refers to a Duke Gundoin, and Gerberding has argued that after the Grimoald coup, Gundoin was appointed as a reward for his services and that Hodo was Gundoin's son.

=== Wissembourg and decline ===
The monastery of Wissembourg, east of Metz, served the Gundoinings much as Echternach served the Pippinids — as a focal point for family donations and alliances. The family's influence was finally broken by Charles Martel in the 720s, after which the descendants of the family are thought to have given their remaining lands to Wissembourg.

== See also ==
- Pippinids
- Agilolfings
- Faronids
- Mayor of the palace
- Merovingian dynasty
