= Liber Historiae Francorum =

Medieval chronicle of 4th- to 8th-century Frankish history

Liber Historiae Francorum (English: "The Book of the History of the Franks") is a chronicle written anonymously during the 8th century. The first sections served as a secondary source for early Franks in the time of Marcomer, giving a short breviarum of events until the time of the late Merovingians. The subsequent sections of the chronicle are important primary sources for the contemporaneous history. They provide an account of the Pippinid family in Austrasia before they became the most famous Carolingians.

The Liber Historiae Francorum uses a lot of material from the earlier Historia Francorum by bishop and historian Gregory of Tours, completed in 594.

== Author, date, and agenda ==
Richard Gerberding, a modern editor of the text, vindicates the coherence and accuracy of its account while giving reasons for locating the anonymous author in Soissons, who was likely a part of the royal monastery of Saint-Medard. Richard Gerberding characterises the author as Neustrian and as "a staunch Merovingian legitimate, secular as opposed to ecclesiastically minded, and an enthusiastic admirer and probably a member of that aristocratic class based on the Seine-Oise valley whose deeds, wars and kings he describes".

Liber Historiae Francorum is customarily dated to the year 727 because of a reference to the end of the sixth year of Theuderic IV. It offers a Neustrian perspective of the era of mayors of the palace, where the factions of the great territorial magnates could only be held in check and balanced by the consecrated legitimacy of the Merovingian king. Liber Historiae Francorum has been explored and interpreted by Richard Gerberding and more recently by Rosamond McKitterick, in History and Memory in the Carolingian World. As a widely read narrative, it helped create a sense of cultural solidarity among the readership for whom it was intended, whose biases it caters to, and whose political agenda it promotes.

As for that agenda, Fouracre and Gerberding show that the book supports the kings of the Merovingian dynasty only insofar as they rule with the consultation of the major nobles. The nobles, in turn, are supported only insofar as they do not aspire above their station.

It is one of a corpus of new books of history written in the 8th century, and copied and widely distributed in the 9th century, which offered their readers (and listeners) a pure and comprehensive background that set the Franks only distantly in the context of the Roman Empire (the Roman Empire is virtually ignored) and more immediately in the Christian Gallo-Roman world.

== Book contents ==
From the outset, the book promises to present the origins and deeds of the Frankish kings and people. It states that the Franks originated from a group of Trojan refugees, similar to the Italian refugees of the Aeneid, finding themselves on the north coast of the Black Sea, before making their way across the Danubian Plain to the Rhineland. To accomplish this, the book relies heavily on the Gallo-Roman bishop and historian Gregory of Tours, who died in 594, whose history it adapts and augments.

The last 19 chapters, numbered 35 through 53 in Bruno Krusch's edition, present an independent account of events in the Frankish lands in the 7th and early 8th centuries.

This part of the work begins with Chlothar II (584–629), who started his reign as an infant King of Neustria, one of the smallest territories of Francia. He was under the regency of his mother, Fredegund, and in an uneasy alliance with Chlothar's uncle Guntram, King of Burgundy (d. 592). Chlothar assumed full power over Neustria upon the death of his mother in 597 and continued his mother's feud with Queen Brunhilda of Austrasia with equal viciousness and bloodshed, finally achieving her execution in an especially brutal manner in 613 and uniting Francia under his rule. Like his father, he built up his territories by invading after the deaths of other kings.

Chlothar's reign was lengthy by contemporary standards, but saw the continuing erosion of royal power by the nobility against a backdrop of feuding Merovingians. The Edict of Paris in 614, which was concerned with several aspects of appointments to offices and the administration of the kingdom, has been interpreted in different ways by modern historians. In 617, Chlothar made the Mayor of the Palace a role held for life, an important step in the progression of this office from being first the manager of the royal household to the effective head of government, and eventually the monarch, under Pepin the Younger in 751. Chlothar ceded rule over Austrasia to his young son Dagobert I in 623. Unusually for a Merovingian monarch, he practiced monogamy, though deaths meant that he had three queens. He was generally an ally of the church and, perhaps inspired by the example of his uncle Guntram, his reign seems to lack the outrageous acts of murder perpetrated by many of his relations, with the exception of the execution of Brunhilda.

Chapter 43 relates the attempted usurpation of Austrasia by the Pippinid mayor Grimoald the Elder in summary form. It ends with Grimoald's death by torture under Clovis II who ruled Neustria. Chapter 44 comments on Clovis:

At the same time, he brought ruin to the kingdom of the Franks with disastrous calamities. This Clovis, moreover, had every kind of filthy habit. He was a seducer and a debaser of women, a glutton, and a drunk. About his death and end, nothing of historical worth may be said. Many writers condemn his end because they do not know the extent of his evil. Thus in uncertainty concerning it, they refer from one to another.

The rest of this chapter and the beginning of the next chapter stretch between Clovis's death, usually dated to the late 650s, and the accession of Theuderic III, usually dated to 673, a four-year reign of "the boy king Chlotar".

Chapters 45ff, as Ursinus the Abbot had done, provide a hostile account of mayor Ebroin of Neustria. In contrast to the description of Clovis II quoted above, the author has nothing but praise for Childebert III, "a famous man", whom he describes as "the glorious lord of good memory, Childebert, the just king." The closing chapters mainly cover Charles Martel.

Liber Historiae Francorum became a primary source for the Continuations to Fredegar's Chronicle, as redacted by Count Childebrand in 751 on behalf of his half-brother, Charles Martel.

== Sources ==
- Bachrach, Bernard S., ed. and trans. (1973), Liber historiae Francorum, Lawrence, Kan.: Coronado Press, OCLC 982458
- Gerberding, Richard Arthur (1987), The Rise of the Carolingians and the Liber historiae Francorum, Oxford: Clarendon Press, ISBN 978-019822940-7
- Fouracre, Paul; Gerberding, Richard Arthur (1996), Late Merovingian France: History and Hagiography, 640-720, Manchester: Manchester University Press, ISBN 978-071904790-9, archived from the original on 2019-06-23
- Krusch, Bruno, ed. (1888), "Liber historiae Francorum", Monumenta Germaniae Historica. Scriptores rerum Merovingicarum (in Latin), vol. II, Hannover: Monumenta Germaniae Historica, pp. 241–328, archived from the original on 2014-01-06
- McKitterick, Rosamond (2005), History and memory in the Carolingian world, Cambridge: Cambridge University Press, ISBN 978-052182717-1
- Latin edition on dmgh website https://www.dmgh.de/mgh_ss_rer_merov_2/index.htm#page/(215)/mode/1up
- Ofli, Erdinç, trans. (2023), Liber Historiae Francorum (Frankların Tarihi), İstanbul: Selenge.
