= Chlodulf of Metz =

Roman Catholic bishop

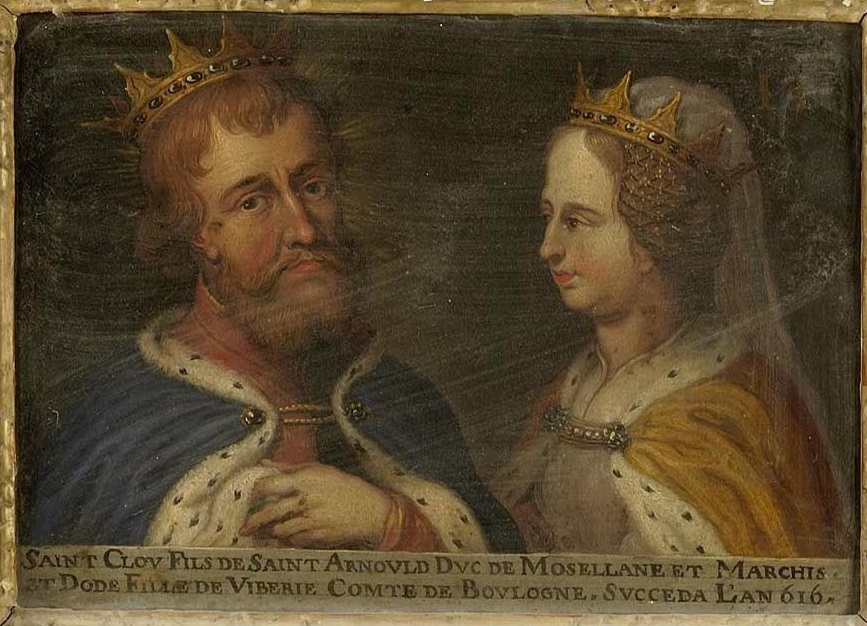
Saint Cloud and his wife Marie

Saint Chlodulf (Clodulphe or Clodould) (605 – June 8, 696 or 697, others say May 8, 697) was bishop of Metz approximately from 657 to 697.

== Life ==
Chlodulf was the son of Arnulf, bishop of Metz, and the brother of Ansegisel, mayor of the palace of Austrasia.

Before his ordination Chlodulf had married an unknown woman and had begotten a son called Aunulf.

In 657, he became bishop of Metz, the third successor of his father, "despite a reputation for impiety in his youth". He held that office for 40 years. During this time he richly decorated the cathedral St. Stephen. He also was in close contact with Saint Gertrude of Nivelles, sister to his brother's wife, Begga.

He died in Metz and was buried in the church of St. Arnulf. In Nivelles he was locally venerated as Saint Clou, especially because of his connection to Saint Gertrude. His Feast Day is June 8.

== Butler's account ==
The hagiographer Alban Butler (1710–1773) wrote in his Lives of the Fathers, Martyrs, and Other Principal Saints under June 8,

St. Clou, or Clodulphus, Bishop of Metz, Confessor.

HE was son of St. Arnold, who having been prime minister to King Clotaire II., surnamed the Great, renounced the world, and was afterwards made bishop of Metz. He had two sons, Clou and Ansegisus, whose inclinations to virtue he cultivated by an excellent education. Clou showed from the cradle that he inherited all his father’s virtues in an eminent degree. Under the best masters he made such a progress in the divine and human sciences, as astonished those who taught him, and excited to emulation all who learned with him. He afterwards lived in the court of the kings of Austrasia, and passed through the greatest employments under Dagobert I. and Sigebert II. always with credit to himself, and to the honour and advantage of the state. 1 After some time he left his brother Ansegisus to push his fortune in the courts of earthly kings, choosing for himself a state which removes a man further from the flattering objects of the passions, and from that hurry of distractions, under which the most virtuous often find it difficult not to lose sight of God in their actions. His father, St. Arnold, had quitted the bishopric of Metz, that he might wear out the remainder of his days in tranquillity, and be ready to meet his heavenly bridegroom. Two other pastors had succeeded him in that see, and it was become a third time vacant, when the clergy and people of Metz unanimously demanded St. Clou for their bishop. The holy man did all that lay in his power to make the election fall on some other person; but the whole country became the more importunate, and the king obliged him at length to acquiesce in a choice made by heaven itself. Having therefore received the episcopal consecration, he cheerfully set himself to fulfil every duty of that important charge. He began by a visitation of his diocess, everywhere correcting abuses, and establishing regularity. Such was his compassion for the poor, that for their sake he lived himself destitute of the most common conveniences of life. By assiduous meditation at the foot of the cross, he was careful to nourish his own soul with the bread of life; and in the same school he acquired that heavenly eloquence with which he delivered, in the most affecting manner, the sentiments and lights which he received by this channel from the God of all science. Full of zeal for the glory of God, and of love and tenderness for his people, he was attentive to all their wants, and indefatigable in labouring for their sanctification, especially in instructing, comforting, and relieving the poor. He governed the church of Metz forty years and fifteen days, and died in 696, being fourscore and ten years old. He is commemorated in the Roman Martyrology on this day. His body was translated to the Benedictin priory of Lay, not far from Nancy, in 959, on the 11th of December; but a portion remains in the church which bears his name at Metz. He is named in the Roman and other Martyrologies. See his authentic life with the notes of Henschenius, Jun. t. 2. p. 126. (Note: Note 1. Pepin of Landen and St. Arnold had shared together the government under Clotaire II. and Dagobert I. with the titles of dukes of Austrasia, and mayors of the palace. Clovis II. succeeded his father Dagobert at Paris, and Sigebert II. in Austrasia; but Grimoald, the son and successor of Pepin of Landen, upon the death of Sigebert II. about the year 655, shaved his infant son Dagobert a monk, and banished him into Ireland, with a view to open a way to the throne for his own son: however Clovis II. made himself master of both their persons, and confined them at Paris for the rest of their days, or, according to others, put them to death: which punishment was due to their treason. Ansegisus married Begga, the virtuous daughter of Pepin of Landen, by whom he had Pepin of Herstal, or the Fat, the valiant and prosperous mayor of the Frankish royal palace, and father of Charles Martel.)

== Sources ==
- Butler, Rev. Alban (1711–73) (1866), The Lives of the Saints, vol. VI: June – via Bartleby.com
