= Annals of Metz =

9th-century chronicle of Frankish history

Annales Mettenses
- Also known as: Annales Mettenses posteriores Annales Mettenses priores Annales Francorum Mettenses
- Author(s): Unknown
- Ascribed to: Gisela, Abbess of Chelles, Unknown
- Language: Latin
- Date: 687 to 830
- Provenance: Francia
- Genre: Chronicle
- Subject: History of the Carolingian family from Pippin of Herstal (687) until Louis the Pious (830)

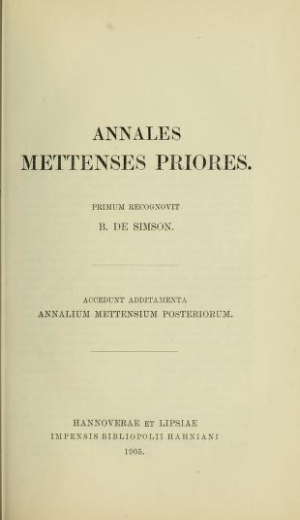
Frontispiece of the Annales Mettenses priores

The Annals of Metz (Latin: Annales Mettenses) are a set of Latin Carolingian annals covering the period of Frankish history from the victory of Pepin II in the Battle of Tertry (687) to the time of writing (c. 806). Sections covering events after 806 are not original writings but were borrowed from other texts and appended to the original annals in the 9th and 12th centuries.

The annals are strongly pro-Carolingian in tone, tracing the rise of the Carolingian dynasty from Pepin of Herstal through to Charlemagne and beyond; they are considered a family history of the Carolingian dynasty.

== Manuscripts ==
There are two main manuscripts, aside from fragmentary evidence, that contain the Annals of Metz. Both manuscripts feature text from additional sources.

=== Annales Mettenses posteriores ===
The title Annals of Metz is a modern addition and derives from the title given by André Duchesne for the manuscript he published in 1626: Annales Francorum Mettenses ("Metz annals of the Franks"), with the larger collection of manuscripts titled the Historia Francorum Scriptores coaetanei. Duchesne believed that the text was written at the Abbey of Saint-Arnould in Metz, where the manuscript he used was found. The version published by Duchesne is today known as the Annales Mettenses posteriores, or the Later Annals of Metz. The original collection that Duchesne published, in which the Earlier Annals of Metz was found, was compiled in the 12th century and includes material from many sources, which allows its narrative to extend from legendary Trojan origins into Frankish history up until 904.

=== Annales Mettenses priores ===
In 1895, Karl Hampe discovered a complete manuscript in the Durham Cathedral library which formed the basis for the Annales Mettenses priores, or the Earlier Annals of Metz. This original source had been used as a source by the later annals and had been considered lost since the discovery of the Later Annals of Metz.

The annals feature year by year entries for the years 687–830, and have been divided by historians Paul J. Fouracre and Richard A. Gerberding into three sections, all of which show clear links to earlier and other contemporary texts, such as the Royal Frankish Annals (RFA) and the continuations of the Chronicle of Fredegar.

First section The first section, covering the period from 687 to 805, was written in 806 by a singular author. With minor additions of their own, they borrow from the continuations of the Chronicle of Fredegar exclusively until 742, from which point onwards until 768 the author includes additions from the RFA. From 768 until 802, the annals borrow primarily from the RFA, and for 803–805, the author creates their own original material.

Second section The second section, covering the period from 806 to 829, is drawn almost verbatim from the RFA and adds very little beyond the copied text.

Third section The third and final section is a single long entry for the year 830 which was added at a later date by another unknown author.

== Composition ==
The composition of the Annales Mettenses priores has been a subject of debate, with the prevailing belief supporting Rosamond McKitterick's assertion, building on Janet Nelson's earlier arguments, that the annals were created either under the jurisdiction of Gisela, Abbess of Chelles and sister of Charlemagne at Chelles Abbey in 806, or a similar monastic institute at St. Denis in Paris. The monastic argument is based upon evidence from within the annals that mentions land possessions based around St. Denis and the burial of Queen Betrada at St. Denis in 783; similar evidence also exists, such as the mentioning of Chelles twice. The most convincing evidence is rooted in the fact that the source maintains a strong, pro-Carolingian royal focus, making any involvement and 'direction', as worded by Jennifer R. Davis, of Gisela, a former member of the royal family and contemporary relation to royalty, a logical conclusion.

However, Paul J. Fouracre and Robert A. Gerberding contest Gisela's influence, or any female direction within the Chelles nunnery, in the composition, and so consider it more likely that the author belonged to the monastery at Metz. They argue that the author "would have been a misogynistic one" from the way she describes Plectrude, Pepin II's wife who opposed Charles Martel, condemning her of "a womanly plan" that featured "feminine cunning more cruelly than was necessary".

== Historiography ==
The Annales Mettenses priores has been used in medieval historiography as evidence of Carolingian rewriting of Merovingian history, as well as in the exploration of the mythology which Carolingian historians attempted to create to justify their legitimacy to rule. Historians Roger Collins and Rosamond McKitterick have both made particular note of the efforts in the Annales to show legitimacy by tracing noble ancestry through the Pippinids; a prime example of this, noted by Paul Fouracre, is the legendary story of Pepin of Herstal and his conflict with Gundoin at the beginning of the Annales. This story is found in no other written source, and it is often cited from the Annales purely due to its unique nature.

This incident is the earliest that the Annales records; it depicts the murder of Gundoin by Pepin probably in the 670s. Gundoin supposedly murdered Pepin's father Ansegisel, and then Pepin, when he was of age, tracked down and killed Gundoin and seized power in Austrasia. – according to the Annales, which is also the earliest source for the Merovingian "decline" narrative, and it offers a basis upon which the Carolingians' eventual ascendance to the throne is legitimate. Upon thus rightly conquering Gundoin, Pepin is then primed to act, as the king Theuderic III, according to the Annales, had become oppressive and unjust, forcing Pepin to invade and defeat him in the great Battle of Tertry in 687. Thereafter, we are told, Pepin held the reins of the kingdom even though he oversaw the succession of Theuderic's sons. As Fouracre argues, this source demonstrates how Carolingian historians, and potentially writings that had connections to the royal courts, were actively attempting to embellish history and the Carolingian lineage to further establish their claim.
