= Glodesind =

Saint, nun, abbess, and founder of a convent in Metz, France

Saint Glodesind
- Born: 572
- Residence: Metz, France
- Died: 608 (aged 35–36)
- Feast: 8 July
- Patronage: Roman Catholic Church

Glodesind (572−608) was a saint, nun, abbess, and founder of a convent in Metz, France, during the time of King Childebert II (575−596) of Austrasia. She was a member of the Carolingian nobility. When she was 11 or 12 years old, she married a young nobleman, who was arrested by the French government shortly after their wedding and executed a year later. Instead of remarrying as her family wanted, she fled to Metz and took refuge at the Church of St. Stephen. Her family gave up forcing her to marry, and she became a nun and later, the abbess of a convent that was built by her parents. She was abbess for six years until her death in 608 at the age of 30. Her feast day is 8 July.

The miracles that established her sainthood did not begin to occur until 25 years after her death, after the first time her body was reinterred. Glodesind was initially interred on the grounds of a church dedicated to Saint Arnulf, but was moved two more times; the final time at a cemetery built on the grounds of her convent in 830, over 200 years after her death. Her sepulcher became a pilgrimage site, and numerous miracles and healings were reported there.

== Life ==
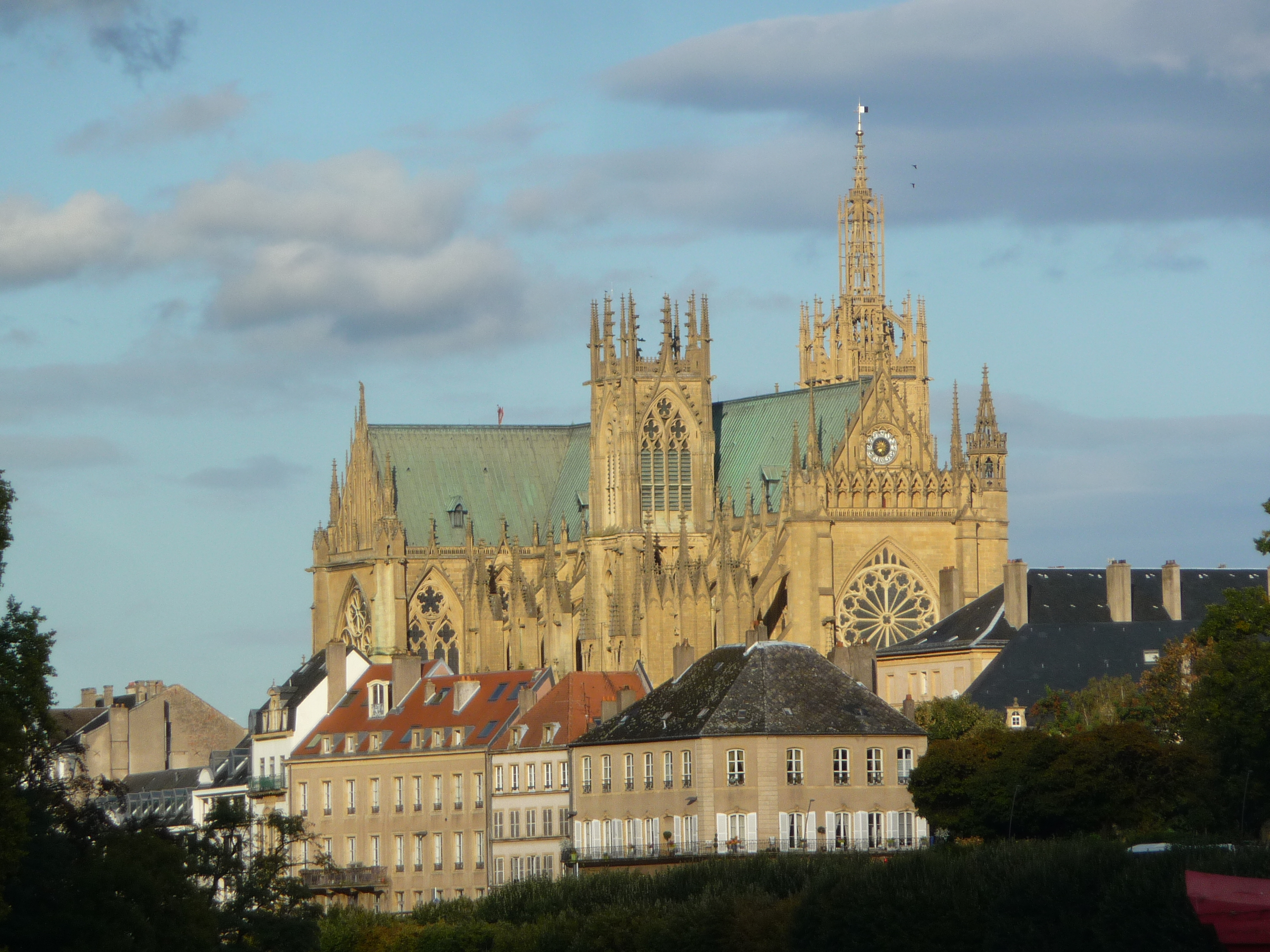
Exterior of the Cathedral of Saint Stephen

Glodesind (572−608; also called Chlodsendis, Clodeswide, Closind, Closseinde, Clothsend, Clotsend, Glossine, and other names) was a saint, nun, abbess, and founder of a convent in Metz, France, during the time of King Childebert II (575−596) of Austrasia. According to hagiographer Jo Ann McNamara, Glodesind was first in the chain of saints associated with the Austrasian nobility. Her father, Wintrio, was an Austrasian duke with extensive holdings in Champagne and was "one of the most formidable nobles in the east Frankish kingdom". Her mother, Godila, was also the daughter of an Austrasian duke. Glodesind's paternal aunt, Rotlinda, was abbess of Ören, a convent at Trier, Germany, and the wife of Saint Arnulf, who was a member of the Carolingian nobility and one of their most important saints; he became bishop of Metz in 614.

When Glodesind was 11 or 12 years old in 590, she married a young nobleman named Obelenus, "a great lord of Champagne", although she was too young to consummate the marriage. Her husband was arrested after bringing her to his castle for his alleged involvement in the attempted assassination and conspiracy against the king. He was imprisoned for a year before he was executed; McNamara speculated that the delay in the execution was "an effort to hold him hostage against his father-in-law's good behavior". (According to hagiographer Sabine Baring-Gould, Wintrio was killed by Theudebert II, King Childebert II's son and heir.) Baring-Gould stated that Glodesind and her husband "loved each other tenderly" and that "the shock [of his death] broke all Glodesind's ties to earth".

Glodesind's father wanted her to remarry, but she fled to Metz and took refuge at the Church of St. Stephen. Her parents did not use force to remove her from the church and bring her back to their home, but according to her biographer, they tried to "use whatever means they could to turn her from her intended path", but she was "neither shaken by their threats nor seduced by their blandishments". They posted a guard at the doors of the church to take her and punish her if she left on her own. She stayed in the church for six days, and on the seventh day, a priest, who rumors stated was actually an angel, "solemnly veiled her, in front of all the people". Her parents believed the rumors, or claimed that they did, so they gave up forcing her to remarry. In 591, Wintrio was ordered to command troops for an excursion into Italy to fight the Lombards, but after gathering his troops in Champagne, he chose to attack Metz first, most likely in retaliation for the loss of his daughter.

Glodesind was later instructed in monastic observances by her aunt Rotlinda in Treves (now Trier), Germany. Glodesind's parents built her a convent in Metz, where she was abbess over more than 100 nuns. She lived there for six years, until she died at the age of 30; according to Baring-Gould, she was "beloved by all". Her feast day is 8 July.

== Legacy ==
The first church where Glodesind was entombed, for 25 years because there was no cemetery at the church on the grounds of her convent, was later dedicated to her aunt's husband, Saint Arnulf. A religious nun who lived at Glodesind's convent claimed to have a vision of Glodesind, directing her to construct a church and altar dedicated to the virgin Mary. The king ordered that a cemetery be built there as well so that Glodesind and other nuns could be entombed there. According to her biographer, ceremonies accompanied the reentombment of Glodesind's body, which showed no signs of decay. After she was reburied on the grounds of the new church, on the right of its altar, a religious nun who was close to death was miraculously healed. Glodesind's body remained there for several months; her biographer reported that another nun received a vision in which she was told that a mouse had entered Glodesind's sepulcher and when it was opened to investigate, they found that the vision was accurate and that Glodesind's right toe, despite her death decades earlier, was bloody. They removed the mouse and sealed up the hole to prevent it from happening again. Her biographer also reported that "countless people were cured there of various infirmities through her merits", until her body was moved to the monastery's cemetery.

In 830, over 200 years after Glodesind's death, Pope Gregory IV ordered that her sepulcher be moved to its third and final resting place, at the convent's church, behind its altar, which had been built and dedicated to the virgin Mary, Saint Peter, and Saint Sulpictius. According to historian Mary F. Thurlkill, the bishop of Metz observed Glodesind's tomb rising out of the ground; he "reckoned this portent signaled Glodesind's desire to move". Thurlkill stated that the miracles attributed to Glodesind attracted many pilgrims and "enjoyed an even more revered status among her family's dead". Thrulkill also stated, "By the seventh century holy bodies such as Glodesind's could be moved at will to illustrate their celestial status but only after the approval of the male episcopacy". Historian Jane Shulenberg stated that Glodesind's body was moved in order to accommodate the need for her nuns and other communities that were not strictly cloistered to have access to their funerary churches and their patron saints' tombs. Glodesind's burial church, for example, was built outside the city, but a special gate was cut into its walls to allow the nuns to pass through monastery and enter the church.

Glodesind's biographer reported that a series of miracles occurred after she was reinterred to the convent's cemetery. These miracles included several pilgrims, mostly women, being healed of blindness and other serious illnesses. (Note: See McNamara, pp. 146–154.) One story about the miracles attributed to Glodesind was about a clerk of the monastery named Fulbert who wanted to cross the river Seille, but was unable to find a transport and sat down on the bank waiting for someone to bring him a boat. He was there for a long time and fell asleep; when he woke up, he was still unable to find a boat, so he prayed to Glodesind to ask God to send him a boat. God heard him and sent him a boat no one was rowing and which the clerk could use himself, which after thanking God, he did. Another of the miracle stories was about a poor man who wanted to visit the monastery, but hesitated because he had no money to donate to the monastery's warden. The man caught a large fish, but it escaped out of the net; he prayed to God, and the same fish miraculously returned to the net, so the man gave it to the warden. Glodesind's biographer reported that Glodesind protected Metz with oil that miraculously flowed, starting at her feet, spreading to her head, and flowed down from her sepulcher in a stream to the pavement below. Not only did the oil heal many people from illnesses, the town "suffered no loss from ruin at that time".

According to McNamara, Glodesind's story represents "a new theme [in medieval hagiography] … in which the heroine defies parental wishes in order to become a bride of Christ". Also according to McNamara, the anonymous, Carolingian monk and hagiographer who recorded her life and subsequent cult history believed that Glodesind had some connection with Saint Arnulf, and as McNamara put it, "was clearly anxious to claim some kinship with him to enhance the reputation of his heroine". McNamara speculates that this was the reason for the late development of her cult. No miracles were attributed to her during her lifetime; she was revered locally, but the miracles that established her claim to sainthood did not begin until 25 years or more after her death, when her body was translated from its initial resting place to the convent that was later named after her. McNamara stated, "In this context, her cult must be seen as part of a process of sacralizing the Carolingian family that culminated in the eighth century with their sacerdotal kingship. Thus the life of a pious nun may have been transformed into full-blown hagiography with the rise of her family in the seventh century and its ultimate construction of a monarchy based on divine sanction".

McNamara speculated that Glodesind's biography might have been drawn from the ancient story of Saint Thecia, an early saint and martyr in the Christian Church. Her biographer did not mention a parallel, although it may be original to Glodesind, a story about "a desperate girl, which provided a stock theme for later writers". The story about Glodesind's veil being given to her was adapted by writers later in the ninth century, and to soften the strength of a virgin's defiance of her parents. McNamara states, however, that Glodesind's biography was probably authentic due to her father Wintrio's violence towards Metz in 591.

== Works cited ==
- McNamara, Jo Ann; Halborg, John E.; Whatley, E. Gordon (eds. and trans.) (1992). Sainted Women of the Dark Ages. Durham, North Carolina: Duke University Press. ISBN 0-8223-8236-9.
