= Gundoin =

Gundoin may refer to:

- Gundoin, Duke of Alsace (fl. 7th century)
- Gundoin, progenitor of the Gundoinings, an Austrasian noble family
