= Martin (Austrasian duke) =

Martin (Latin: Martinus) was an Austrasian duke (dux) in the late 7th century.

After the assassination of King Dagobert II of Austrasia in 679, Count Martin (dux Martinus) and Pepin of Herstal were the leading noblemen of Austrasia and led the resistance against Neustrian mayor Ebroin, who had designs on all of Francia. Ebroin defeated the Austrasians in the Battle of Lucofao (679/80). Pepin escaped to Cologne; Martin made it back to Laon, where he was slain on Ebroin's orders. Martin's date of death is unknown. He is buried in the Basilica of Saint Denis.

== Possible family connections ==
With only a few mentions in medieval texts, much about Martin has been subject to speculation. It has been suggested by some historians that Martin was the brother of his ally, Pepin of Herstal. Others do not accept, or even refute the link. Were they brothers, Martin would be a son of Pepin's parents, Ansegisel and Begga and thus grandson of Arnulf of Metz and Pepin of Landen. Martin has also been suggested as the husband of Bertrada of Prüm which would make him father of Charibert of Laon, himself a grandfather of Charlemagne. This possible relationship is also uncertain.
