= Leudesius =

Assassinated mayor of Neustria

Leudesius (assassinated 676) was the son of Erchinoald, Mayor of the Palace of Neustria, and his wife Leutsinde.

Leudesius inherited his father's properties on his death in 658. In 659, there was a dispute between the Archdiocese of Rouen and Abbey of Saint-Denis over his property.

When, in 673, the Burgundians under Leodegar defeated the mayor Ebroin and king Theuderic III, they exiled Ebroin to a monastery. The Austrasian mayor Wulfoald took over the power in Neustria, but fled back to Austrasia on the assassination of Childeric II in 675. The Neustrians turned to Leudesius to replace him. The next year, Ebroin returned. Leudesius and Theuderic III fled with the royal treasure to Baizieux, where Ebroin overtook them and had Leudesius murdered.

== Sources ==
=== Primary sources ===
- Liber historiae Francorum, edited by B. Krusch, in Mon. Germ. hist. script. rer. Merov. vol. ii.
- Vita sancti Leodegarii, by Ursinus, then a monk of St Maixent (Migne, Patrilogia Latina, vol. xcvi.)
- Vita metrica in Poetae Latini aevi Carolini, vol. iii. (Mon. Germ. Hist.)
- Diplomata Regum Francorum. Mon. Germ. hist. DD Mer (1872), no. 37, p. 34.
- Chronicon Ebersheimense 4, Mon. Germ. hist. SS XXIII, pp. 433–4.
- Cronica Hohenburgensis 664, Annales Marbacenses, Mon. Germ. hist. SS in Usum Scholarum [9], p. 3.
- Wallace-Hadrill, J. M., translator. The Fourth Book of the Chronicle of Fredegar with its Continuations. Greenwood Press: Connecticut, 1960.

=== Secondary sources ===
- Pitra, J. B. Histoire de Saint Léger. Paris, 1846.
- Friedrich, J. "Zur Geschichte des Hausmeiers Ebroin." Proceedings of the Academy of Munich. 1887, pp 42–61.
- "Ebroïn" . Encyclopædia Britannica. Vol. 8 (11th ed.). 1911. p. 844.
- "France § History" . Encyclopædia Britannica. Vol. 10 (11th ed.). 1911. p. 806.

Preceded by Wulfoald	Mayor of the Palace of Neustria; 675–676	Succeeded by Ebroin
