= Ansoald =

7th-century Bishop of Poitiers

Ansoald (Latin: Ansoaldus) was the bishop of Poitiers from 676 until about 696.

Ansoald was probably a Burgundian from the region around Autun. He inherited land from both his parents near Chalon-sur-Saône. In the second version of the Suffering of Leodegar, it is claimed that Ansoald was a relative of the martyred Leodegar. Although the second version of the Suffering was dedicated to Ansoald, it was probably composed in the middle of the 8th century by Ursinus, long after his death.

The Gesta Dagoberti, a late and legendary source, claims that Ansoald was passing through Sicily on a diplomatic mission when King Dagobert I died (639). The reported vision of a local hermit named John, supposedly told to Ansoald, describes Dagobert's narrow escape from Hell with the help of some saints.

After the return to power of the mayor of the palace Ebroin in 674 or 675, Ansoald hosted the exiled Philibert of Jumièges and helped him found the new monastery of Noirmoutier. His lands at Chalon he donated to the new monastery. He also founded a xenodochium (hospice) for travellers. The Life of Eligius claims that Ansoald was close to the circle of followers of Columbanus.

According to the Deeds of the Bishops of Cambrai, Ansoald was at the royal palace when he learned of the miracles that followed the martyrdom of Leodegar. Probably around 681 or 682, he disputed the possession of the body of the martyr with Bishops Hermenar of Autun and Vindician of Cambrai. Ansoald claim the body on the grounds that he was related by blood to the martyr and that Leodegar had also previously been abbot of the Abbey of Saint-Maixent in the diocese of Poitiers. Ansoald won possession of the martyr through the drawing of lots. He had a church built to house the body at Saint-Maixent, which was probably dedicated on 30 October 684.

Ansoald rebuilt the church of Mazerolles. He has also been credited with the restoration work on the baptistery of Saint-Jean in Poitiers, which is the best preserved Merovingian structure in France.

== Bibliography ==
- Andrieux, Jean-Paul (1995). "Observations sur la donation de l'évêque Ansoald de 677". Société des amis des arts et des sciences de Tournus. 94: 221–244.
- Bachrach, Bernard S.; Bachrach, David S.; Leese, Michael, eds. (2018). Deeds of the Bishops of Cambrai: Translation and Commentary. Routledge.
- Bernstein, Alan E. (2017). Hell and Its Rivals: Death and Retribution among Christians, Jews, and Muslims in the Early Middle Ages. Cornell University Press.
- Drews, Wolfram (2020). "Migrants and Minorities in Merovingian Gaul". In Bonnie Effros; Isabel Moreira (eds.). The Oxford Handbook of the Merovingian World. Oxford University Press. pp. 117–138.
- Fouracre, Paul J.; Gerberding, Richard A., eds. (1996). Late Merovingian France: History and Hagiography, 640–720. Manchester University Press.
- Fox, Yaniv (2014). Power and Religion in Merovingian Gaul: Columbanian Monasticism and the Frankish Elites. Cambridge University Press.
- Hourihane, Colum P., ed. (2012). "Poitiers". The Grove Encyclopedia of Medieval Art and Architecture. Vol. 2. Oxford University Press. pp. 59–66.
- Lewis, Stephen M. (2016). "Salt and the Earliest Scandinavian Raids in France: Was there a Connection?". Viking and Medieval Scandinavia. 12: 103–136. doi:10.1484/j.vms.5.112420.
- Nonn, Ulrich (1972). "Zum 'Testament' Bischof Ansoalds von Poitiers". Archiv für Diplomatik. 18: 413–418.
- Rech, Régis (2016). "Gesta Dagoberti I regis Francorum". In G. Dunphy; C. Bratu (eds.). Encyclopedia of the Medieval Chronicle. Brill Online.
- Tardif, J. (1898). "Les chartes mérovingiennes de Noirmoutier". Nouvelle revue historique de droit franc̜ais et étranger. 22: 763–790.
