= Lambert le Bègue =

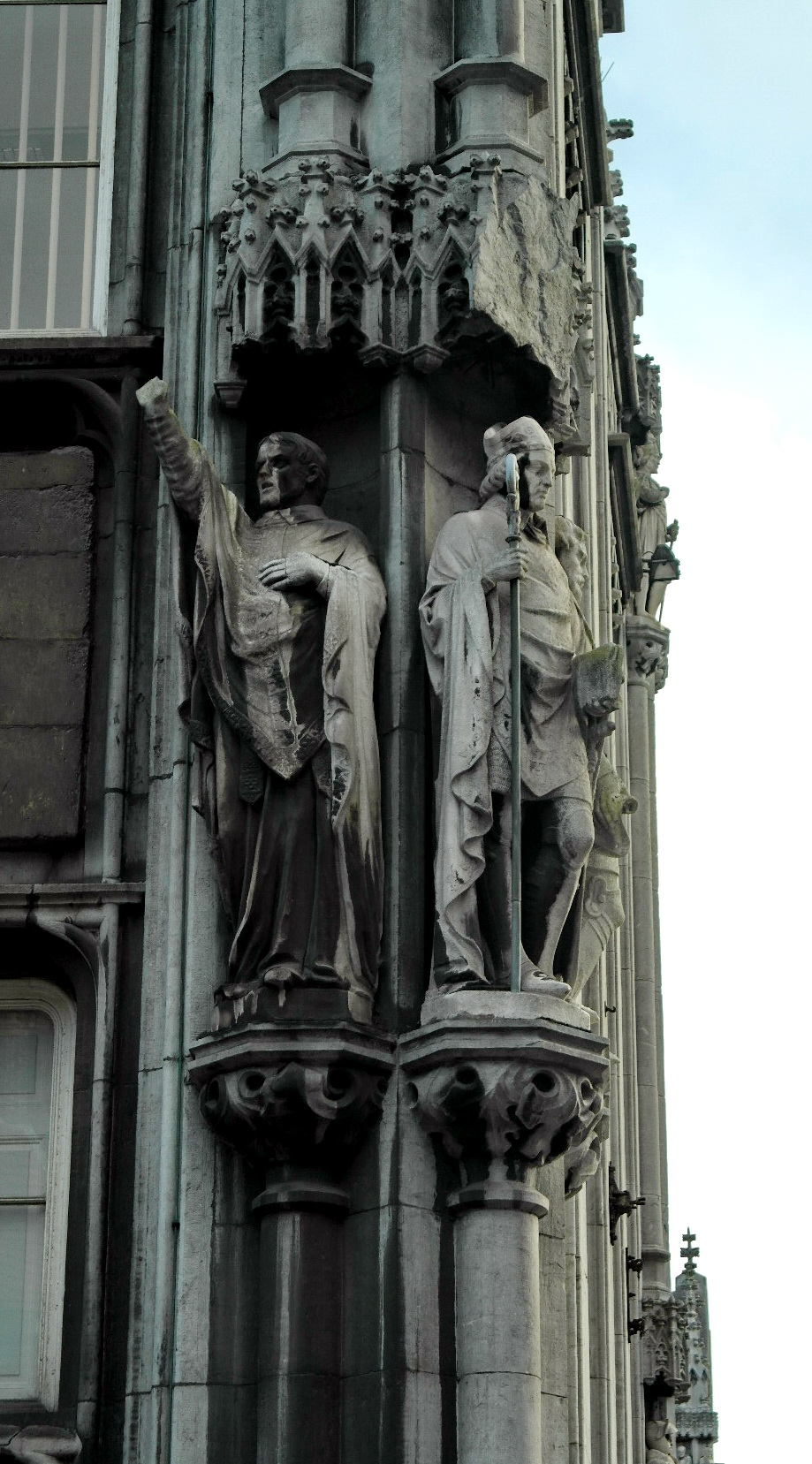
19th-century statue of Lambert le Bègue (left) at the provincial palace in Liège

Lambert le Bègue, also called Lambert li Bègues, (English: Lambert the Stutterer) was a priest and reformer, who lived in Liège, Belgium, in the middle of the 12th century.

== Life ==
Whether he was named "le Bègue" (the "Stammerer") because of some speech problem is not known.

The son of poor people, he was ordained priest sometime before 1164, and was first in charge of a church affiliated with the cathedral in Liège, probably St. Martin-en-Île. He refused to pay an increase in the annual tribute to the collegiate chapter of St. Pauls' and was reassigned to the smaller chapel of St. Christopher on the outskirts of the city. At the diocesan synod of 1166 he spoke out against the abuses of the clergy, protesting against simony, the ordination of sons of priests, and certain customs in the administration of the Sacrament of Baptism and the celebration of Mass.

He ascribed greater importance to the devout mind and practical love of one's neighbor than to means of grace and sacraments. He founded in Liège the hospital of St. Christopher. In time he gathered about him a popular following, for whom he translated into the vernacular (French) the Life of the Blessed Virgin Mary, the Life of St Agnes, the Acts of the Apostles, and the Epistles of St. Paul, with commentaries; these translations unfortunately have not been preserved.

The foundation of such groups reflected the general flowering of the religious life among the laity in the towns of northern Europe during the late Middle Ages. The communities of beguines also served as refuges for women left widowed or unmarried by the participation of large numbers of men in the Crusades. The members frequently lived in individual apartments in a large, separately enclosed section of town called the beguinage. They renounced their goods and lived a semi-conventual life, but took no vows and followed none of the approved monastic rules. They dressed in distinctive costumes and spent their days in prayer, education, care of the sick, and work such as weaving.

But he also had adversaries, especially among the clergy, and it was to refute them that he wrote a defense of his theories, entitled "Antigraphum Petri". His writings reveal him a man very learned for his time. They abound with quotations, not only from the Bible, but also from the Fathers of the Church, such as St. Gregory, St. Augustine and St. Bernard, and even from profane authors like Ovid, Virgil and Cicero.

Accused of heresy, he was condemned and imprisoned notwithstanding his appeal to the Holy See. He escaped and went over to the antipope Callistus III, who had been recognized by Raoul of Zahringen, Prince-Bishop (i.e. bishop and secular ruler) of Liège. He wrote to the Pope several letters in justification of his doctrines and conduct, with the pope supporting him. In all probability he returned to Liège where he died in 1177.

Walter Simons points out that the belief that he founded the beguines did not arise until the mid-thirteenth century, and discounts it as beguines did not begin to appear in Liège until sometime after his death.

== Commemoration ==
The Rue Lambert-le-Bègue is situated in the old district of the beguines in Liège.

== Sources ==
- Fayen, Arnold (1913). "Lambert Le Bègue". In Herbermann, Charles (ed.). Catholic Encyclopedia. New York: Robert Appleton Company.
- Haupt, Herman (1910) [1953]. "Lambert le Bègue". In Jackson, Samuel Macauley; Sherman, Charles Colebrook (eds.). The New Schaff–Herzog Encyclopedia of Religious Knowledge. Vol. VI. Grand Rapids, MI: Funk & Wagnalls.
- Schaff, Philip (1890). History of the Christian Church. Vol. V. §83.
- Simons, Walter (2001). Cities of Ladies: Beguine Communities in the Medieval Low Countries, 1200–1565. Pennsylvania UP. ISBN 978-0812236040.
- McGinn, Bernard (1998). The Flowering of Mysticism - Men and Women in the New Mysticism (1200 - 1350). The Crossroad Publishing Company. pp. 32–33. ISBN 0-8245-1743-1.
