= Hunald =

Hunald, also spelled Hunold, Hunoald, Hunuald or Chunoald (French: Hunaud; Latin: Hunaldus or Chunoaldus), is a masculine given name of Germanic origin. It may refer to:

- Hunald I, duke of Aquitaine (735–45)
- Hunald II, duke of Aquitaine (768–69)
- Hunold of Cambrai, bishop (1040–50)
- Hunald of Toul (fl. 11th century), poet who wrote Carmen de anulo et baculo
- Hunald (fl. 11th century), Benedictine monk, sculptor, stonemason and architect from Dijon
- Hunald of Béarn (fl. 1073–91), abbot of Moissac
- Hunald (fl. 12th century), Premonstratensian canon from Bonne-Espérance Abbey
- Raymond Hunaud (d. 1299), Dominican friar from Toulouse
