= Arnulf of Metz =

7th-century Frankish bishop and Catholic saint

Saint Arnulf of Metz
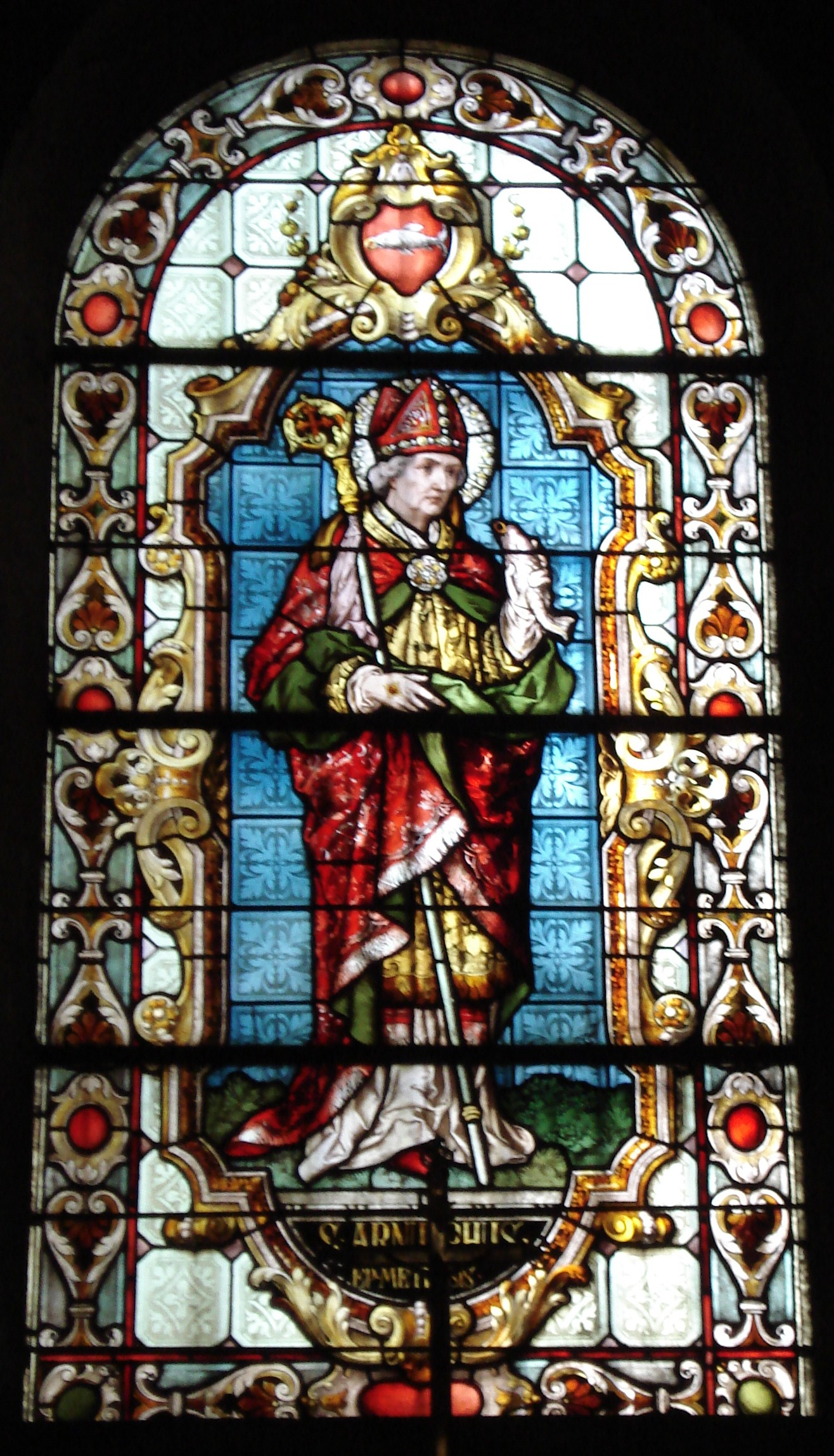
- Born: c. 582; Lay-Saint-Christophe
- Died: 643/47; Habendum, near Remiremont
- Venerated in: Catholic Church; Eastern Orthodox Church
- Feast: 18 July
- Attributes: Portrayed with a rake in his hand
- Patronage: Brewers

Arnulf of Metz (c. 582 – c. 645) was a Frankish bishop of Metz and advisor to the Merovingian court of Austrasia. He later retired to the Abbey of Remiremont. In French he is also known as Arnoul or Arnoulf. In English he is known as Arnold.

== Genealogy ==
The Vita Sancti Arnulfi (c. 657), written shortly after Arnulf's death, states that he was of Frankish ancestry, from "sufficiently elevated and noble parentage, and very rich in worldly goods". Tenth- and eleventh-century texts like Genealogiae Breves Regum Francorum often claim that Arnoald was Arnulf's father, but this is considered a fabrication. Medieval Frankish historians Patrick Geary and Richard Gerberding observe that the lack of contemporary written texts makes it impossible to trace Arnulf's ancestry.

Arnulf of Metz is traditionally considered the earliest named ancestor of Charlemagne and the Carolingian dynasty. This belief originates from two sources written after Arnulf's death. Paul the Deacon's Liber de episcopis Mettensibus (c. 784) presents Arnulf as Charlemagne's third great-grandfather, while Annales Mettenses Priores (805) depicts him as only a "close relative." Because these two accounts are inconsistent and written a century after Arnulf's death, some scholars say that the familial connection between Arnulf and Charlemagne was an invention by Charlemagne.

== Life ==
Arnulf was born to an important Frankish family near Nancy in Lorraine around 582. The family owned vast domains between the Moselle and Meuse rivers. As an adolescent, he was called to the Merovingian court of king Theudebert II (595–612) of Austrasia, where he was educated by Gondulf of Provence. Arnulf was later sent to serve as dux at the Schelde.

Arnulf gave distinguished service at the Austrasian court under Theudebert II. He distinguished himself both as a military commander and in the civil administration; at one time he had under his care six distinct provinces. Arnulf married in 596 to a noblewoman whom later sources identify as Dode or Doda (born c. 584), the paternal aunt of Saint Glodesind of France, an abbess of a monastery in Metz. Chlodulf of Metz was their eldest son, but more important was their close relative Ansegisel, who married Begga, daughter of Pepin I of Landen.

Around 611, Arnulf and his friend Romaricus, likewise an officer of the court, planned to make a pilgrimage to the Abbey of Lérins. Chlothachar, who appreciated Arnulf's administrative skills, offered him the vacant see of Metz, the capital of the Austrasian kingdom. His wife took the veil as a nun in a monastery at Trèves, and Arnulf saw it as a sign of God and became a priest and bishop afterwards. He continued to serve as the king's steward and courtier.

The rule of Austrasia came into the hands of Brunhilda, the grandmother of Theudebert, who ruled also in Burgundy in the name of her great-grandchildren. In 613 Arnulf joined his politics with Pepin of Landen and led the opposition of Frankish nobles against Queen Brunhilda. The revolt led to her overthrow, torture and eventual execution, and the subsequent reunification of Frankish lands under Chlothachar II.

Chlothachar later made his son Dagobert I king of Austrasia, which he ruled with the help of his adviser Arnulf. Pepin of Landen became mayor of the palace. In 624 Pepin and Arnulf encouraged Dagobert in the murder of Chrodoald, an important leader of the Frankish Agilolfings family. In 625 Arnulf took part in a council held by the Frankish bishops at Reims.

During his career he was attracted to religious life, and around 628 he retired to a hermitage at a mountain site in his domains in the Vosges to become a monk. His friend Romaric, whose parents had been killed by Brunhilda, had preceded him to the mountains around 613; there Romaric and Amatus established Remiremont Abbey. After the death of Chlothachar in 629, Arnulf settled near Habendum, where he died some time between 643 and 647. He was buried at Remiremont.

Arnulf is venerated as a saint by the Catholic Church. In iconography, he is typically portrayed with a pastoral staff or a rake in his hand. His feast day is July 18.

== Legends ==
There are three legends associated with Arnulf:

=== The Legend of the Ring ===
Arnulf was tormented by the violence that surrounded him and feared that he had played a role in the wars and murders that plagued the ruling families. Obsessed by these sins, Arnulf went to a bridge over the Moselle river. There he took off his bishop's ring and threw it into the river, praying to God to give him a sign of absolution by returning the ring to him. Many penitent years later, a fisherman brought to the bishop's kitchen a fish in the stomach of which was found the bishop's ring. Arnulf repaid the sign from God by immediately retiring as bishop and becoming a hermit for the remainder of his life.

=== The Legend of the Fire ===
At the moment Arnulf resigned as bishop, a fire broke out in the cellars of the royal palace and threatened to spread throughout the city of Metz. Arnulf, full of courage and feeling unity with the townspeople, stood before the fire and said, "If God wants me to be consumed, I am in His hands." He then made the sign of the cross, at which point the fire immediately receded.

=== The Legend of the Beer Mug ===
It was July 642 and very hot when the parishioners of Metz went to Remiremont to recover the remains of their former bishop. They had little to drink and the terrain was inhospitable. At the point when the exhausted procession was about to leave Champigneulles, one of the parishioners, Duc Notto, prayed "By his powerful intercession the Blessed Arnold will bring us what we lack." Immediately the small remnant of beer at the bottom of a pot multiplied in such amounts that the pilgrims' thirst was quenched and they had enough to enjoy the next evening when they arrived in Metz. For this reason he is known as the patron saint of Brewers.

== See also ==
- The Pippinids, who traced their descent from Arnulf
- Tonantius Ferreolus (senator)
