= Ebroin =

Frankish mayor of the palace of Neustria

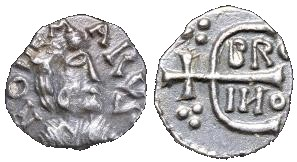
Coin of Ebroin and bearing his effigy

Ebroin (died 680 or 681) was the Frankish mayor of the palace of Neustria on two occasions; firstly from 658 to his deposition in 673 and secondly from 675 to his death in 680 or 681. In a violent and despotic career, he strove to impose the authority of Neustria, which was under his control, over Burgundy and Austrasia.

== Life and career ==
Following the failed coup of the Pippinid mayor Grimoald the Elder in Austrasia, the Merovingian court resided in Neustria. According to the Liber historiae Francorum, during the reign of Chlothar III the mayor Erchinoald of Neustria died. In 659, a council of Franks elected Ebroin as his replacement.

The Life of Saint Eligius records that as of the middle 670s Ebroin had only one child, a son named Bobo; Bobo was then convalescing from an illness contracted during his adolescence. Based on that, Bobo was likely born around 660.

Queen Balthild of Chelles served as regent for her son Chlothar III. After a power struggle with Ebroin, she withdrew to the Abbey of Chelles near Paris in 664.

The English scholar Bede (IV.1) took notice of an anecdote concerning Ebroin in 668. Bede tells that Ebroin waylaid an Englishman returning from Rome, for fear that the Byzantine Emperor (Constans II, residing in Syracuse) was plotting an alliance against his rule. It follows that Ebroin by 668 had arrogated to himself the de facto rule of Neustria and so (in theory) "of the Franks".

It remains unclear how direct was Ebroin's influence over the next four years (the Liber historiae may imply that Chlothar had roused himself by then), but when Chlothar died in 673 Ebroin was back in charge. Ebroin then raised another brother, Theuderic III, as king of Neustria, without consulting the other nobles.

Ebroin endeavoured to maintain the union of Neustria and Burgundy, but the great Burgundian nobles wished to remain independent. They rose under bishop Leodegar (or Léger) of Autun and Adalrich, Duke of Alsace and offered the crown to Theuderic's elder brother Childeric II, then ruling in Austrasia. Childeric replaced Ebroin with his Austrasian Mayor of the Palace, Wulfoald. Eboin's life was spared at the intervention of a number of bishops; he was tonsured and confined to Luxeuil. A proclamation was then issued to the effect that each kingdom should keep its own laws and customs, that there should be no further interchange of functionaries between the kingdoms, and that no one should again set up a tyranny like that of Ebroin. Soon, however, Leodegar too was defeated by Wulfoald and the Austrasians, and was himself confined at Luxeuil in 673.

== Return to power ==
When Childeric II was murdered at Bondi that year, by a disaffected Frank, Theoderic III was reinstalled as king in Neustria with Leudesius as his mayor. Ebroin and Leodegar took advantage of the confusion to leave the cloister, and soon found themselves once more face to face. Each looked for support to a different Merovingian king, Ebroin even proclaiming a false Merovingian imposter as sovereign. In a short time Ebroin caused Leudesius to be murdered and became mayor once again, now with a score to settle with Leodegar.

About 675 Ebroin reimposed his authority over Neustria and most of Burgundy, and induced the Duke of Champagne and the Bishops of Châlons and Valence to attack Autun. They invaded the city and forced it to surrender. Ebroin had Leodegar's eyes put out. Ebroin persuaded the king that Childeric's murder had occurred under Leodegar's instigation; and so the king had Leodegar additionally arrested, tried, and exiled. On 12 October 678 Ebroin had his enemy led away and murdered.

Ebroin meanwhile had defeated the Austrasians at the Battle of Bois-du-Fays, near Laon, uniting France under Neustrian rule. After the battle, Duke Martin, who had made it back to his city, was lured to Ecry with false assurances on the pretext of negotiations with Theuderic. Martin and his supporters were then killed.

His triumph, however, was short-lived; he was assassinated in 681, the victim of a combined attack of his numerous enemies.

In 684, Ansoald, bishop of Poitiers in Neustria, the homeland of Leudesius, commissioned a Life of Leodegar the Burgundian. It cast Ebroin as an enemy of God motivated by nothing but ambition and a lust for power. This biography became canonised in the Church to such an extent that Leodegar, too, was canonised as Saint Leger. Tales of Ebroin's infamy were also found useful by the Austrasians, whose own ambitious mayoral family commissioned the continuations to the chronicle of Fredegar.

== Sources ==
=== Primary sources ===
- Liber historiae Francorum, edited by B. Krusch, in Monumenta Germaniae historica script. rer. Merov. vol. ii.
- Vita sancti Leodegarii, by Ursinus, then a monk of St Maixent (Migne, Patrologia Latina, vol. xcvi.)
- Vita metrica in Poetae Latini aevi Carolini, vol. iii. (Mod. Germ. Hist.)

=== Secondary sources ===
- J. B. Pitra, Histoire de Saint Léger (Paris, 1846)
- J. Friedrich, Zur Geschichte des Hausmeiers Ebroin, in the Proceedings of the Academy of Munich (1887, pp. 42–61)

| Preceded by Erchinoald | Mayor of the Palace of Neustria; 658–673 | Succeeded by Wulfoald |
| Preceded by Leudesius | Mayor of the Palace of Neustria; 675–680 | Succeeded by Waratton |
