= Pepin of Herstal =

Duke and Prince of the Franks (635–714)

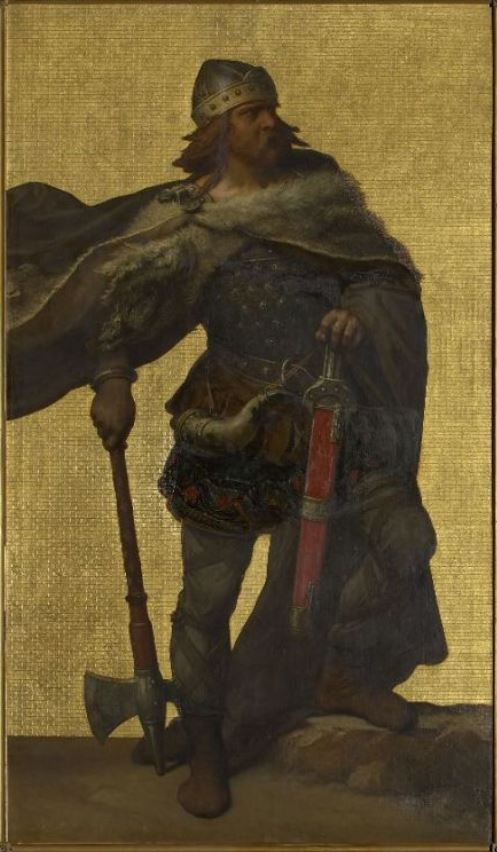
- Pepin of Herstal, as depicted by Louis Gallait for the hemicycle of the Belgian Senate

Duke and Prince of the Franks
- Reign: 687–714
- Successor: Charles Martel

Mayor of the Palace of Austrasia
- Reign: 680–714
- Predecessor: Wulfoald
- Successor: Theudoald

Mayor of the Palace of Neustria
- Reign: 687–695
- Predecessor: Berchar
- Successor: Grimoald

Mayor of the Palace of Burgundy
- Reign: 687–695
- Predecessor: Position reestablished
- Successor: Drogo
- Born: 635
- Died: 16 December 714; Jupille, Austrasia
- Burial: Basilique Notre-Dame de Chèvremont, Liège
- Spouse: Plectrude; Alpaida (mistress)
- Issue: Grimoald the Younger; Drogo of Champagne; Charles Martel; Childebrand
- House: Arnulfings; Pippinids (maternal)
- Father: Ansegisel
- Mother: Begga

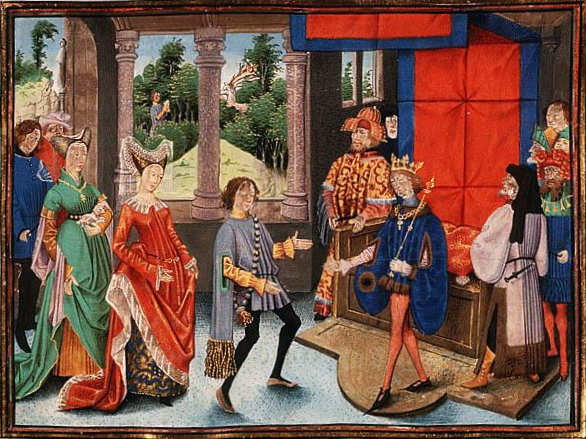
The painting of St Hubert of Liège as he offers his services to Pepin of Heristal

Pepin II (c. 635 – 16 December 714), commonly known as Pepin of Herstal, was a Frankish statesman and military leader who was the de facto ruler of Francia as the Mayor of the Palace from 680 until his death. He took the title Duke and Prince of the Franks upon his conquest of all the Frankish realms.

The son of the powerful Frankish statesman Ansegisel, Pepin worked to establish his family, the Pippinids, as the strongest in Francia. He became Mayor of the Palace in Austrasia in 680. Pepin subsequently embarked on several wars to expand his power. He united all the Frankish realms by the conquests of Neustria and Burgundy in 687. In foreign conflicts, Pepin increased the power of the Franks by his subjugation of the Alemanni, the Frisians, and the Franconians. He also began the process of evangelisation in Germany.

Pepin's statesmanship was notable for the further decrease of Merovingian royal authority, and for the acceptance of his family's undisputed right to rule. Therefore, Pepin was able to name as heir his grandson Theudoald. But this was not accepted by his powerful son Charles Martel, leading to a civil war after his death in which the latter emerged victorious.

== Background ==
Pepin, sometimes called Pepin II and Pepin the Middle, was the grandson and namesake of Pepin I the Elder through the marriage of Pepin I's daughter Begga to Ansegisel. He was also the grandfather of Pepin the Short and great-grandfather of Charlemagne. That marriage united the two houses of the Pippinids and the Arnulfings which created what would be called the Carolingian dynasty. Pepin II was probably born in Herstal (Héristal), modern Belgium (where his centre of power lay), whence his byname (sometimes "of Heristal").

== Rise to power ==
As mayor of Austrasia, Pepin and Martin, the duke of Laon, fought the Neustrian mayor Ebroin, who had designs on all Francia. Neustria, unlike Austrasia, had a tradition of a stronger central government. Ebroin defeated the Austrasians in the Battle of Lucofao and came close to uniting all the Franks under his rule; however, he was assassinated in 681, the victim of a combined attack by his numerous enemies Pepin immediately made peace with his successor, Waratton.

However, Waratton's successor, Berchar, and the Neustrian king Theuderic III, who, since 679, was nominal king of all the Franks, made war on Austrasia. The king and his mayor were decisively defeated at the Battle of Tertry (Textrice) in the Vermandois in 687. Berchar and Theuderic withdrew themselves to Paris, where Pepin followed and eventually forced on them a peace treaty with the condition that Berchar leave his office. Pepin was created mayor in all three Frankish kingdoms (Austrasia, Neustria, and Burgundy) and began calling himself Duke and Prince of the Franks (dux et princeps Francorum). In the ensuing quarrels, Berchar killed his mother-in-law Ansfled and fled. His wife Anstrude married Pepin's eldest son Drogo, Duke of Champagne, and Pepin's place in Neustria was secured.

== Duke and Prince of the Franks ==
The Neustrians barely tolerated an Austrasian overlord, but Pepin preferred to put these local resistances aside to deal with Germany. Over the next several years, Pepin subdued the Alemanni, Frisians, and Franconians, bringing them within the Frankish sphere of influence. Between 690 and 692, Utrecht fell. This gave the Franks control of important trade routes on the Rhine to the North Sea. He also supported the missionary work of Willibrord. In 695, he placed Drogo in the Burgundian mayorship and his other son, Grimoald, in the Neustrian one.

Around 670, Pepin had married Plectrude, who had inherited substantial estates in the Moselle region. She was the mother of Drogo of Champagne and Grimoald II, both of whom died before their father. However, Pepin also had a mistress (or possibly, a second wife) named Alpaida (or Chalpaida) who bore him two more sons: Charles Martel and Childebrand.

== Marriage and children ==
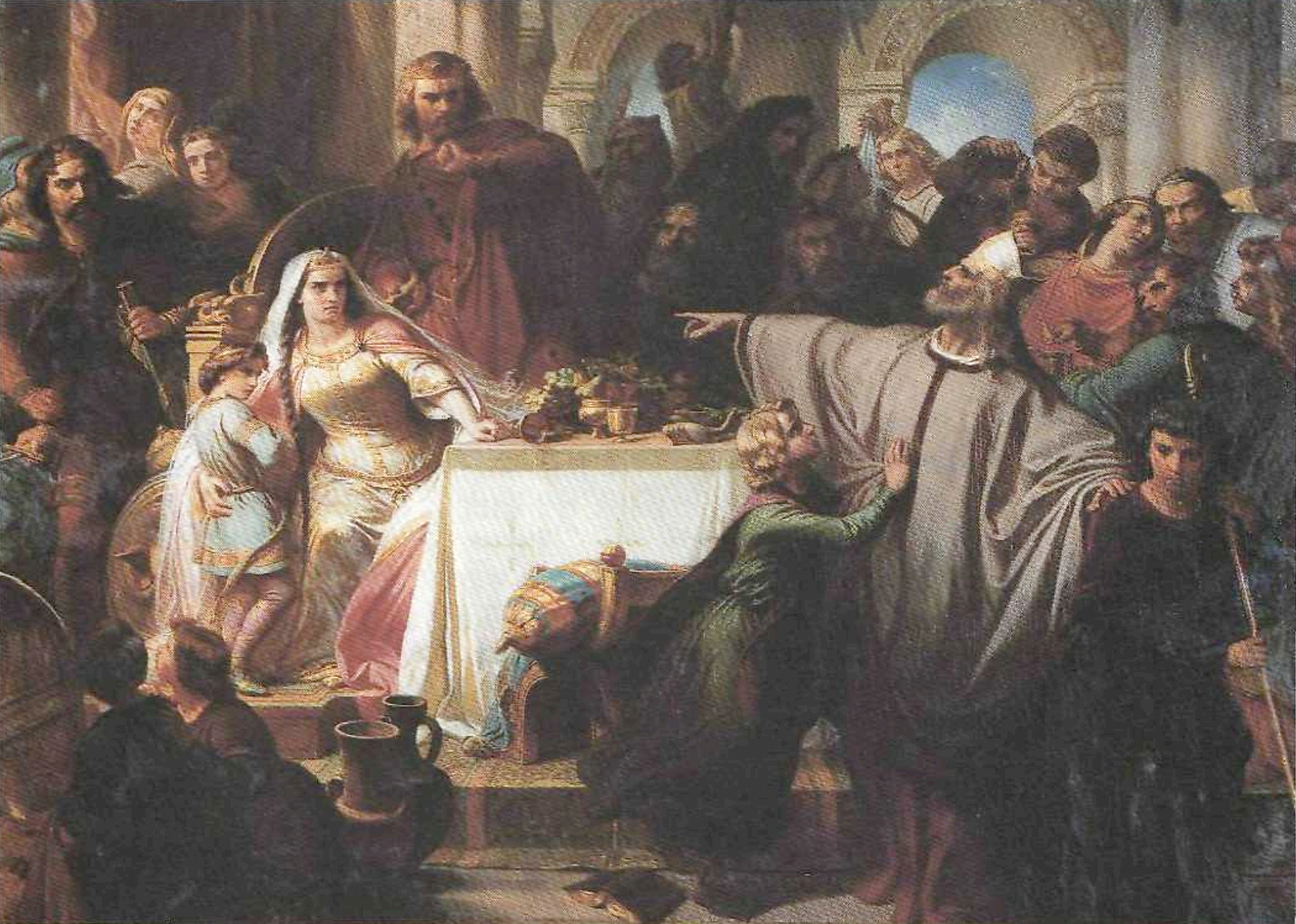
Banquet of Jupille (1861) by Auguste Chauvin depicting Saint Lambert addressing Pepin and his second wife Alpaida.

Pepin married Plectrude and had two children:

- Drogo
- Grimoald

Pepin had one son by an unnamed mistress:

- Childebrand I

Pepin had one son by Alpaida:

- Charles Martel

== Death and succession ==
Just before Pepin's death, Plectrude convinced him to disinherit the sons he had with his mistress Alpaida in favour of his grandson, Theudoald (the son of Pepin and Plectrude's son Grimoald), who was still a young child (and amenable to Plectrude's control). Pepin died suddenly at the age of 79 on 16 December 714, at Jupille (in modern Belgium). His grandchildren through Plectrude claimed themselves to be Pepin's true successors and, with the help of Plectrude, tried to maintain the position of mayor of the palace after Pepin's death. However, Charles (son of Pepin and Alpaida) had gained favour among the Austrasians, primarily for his military prowess and ability to keep them well supplied with booty from his conquests. Despite the efforts of Plectrude to silence her child's rival by imprisoning him, he became the sole mayor of the palace—and de facto ruler of Francia—after a civil war which lasted for more than three years after Pepin's death.

== Cultural uses ==
In 2018, the Dutch production company Farmhouse released a movie called Redbad, based on the historical Radbod of Frisia and directed by Roel Reiné. Jonathan Banks played Pepin of Herstal, who is the main villain in this movie.

== Sources ==
- Oman, Charles. The Dark Ages 476–918. London: Rivingtons, 1914.
- Wallace-Hadrill, J. M., translator. The Fourth Book of the Chronicle of Fredegar with its Continuations. Connecticut: Greenwood Press, 1960.
- Bachrach, Bernard S., translator. Liber Historiae Francorum. 1973.

Pepin of Herstal Arnulfing Dynasty Born: 635 Died: 714
Preceded by Wulfoald	Mayor of the Palace of Austrasia; 680–714	Succeeded by Theudoald
Preceded by Berchar	Mayor of the Palace of Neustria; 687–695	Succeeded by Grimoald the Younger
Preceded by Berchar	Mayor of the Palace of Burgundy; 687–695	Succeeded by Drogo
New title	Duke of the Franks; 687–714	Succeeded by Charles Martel
