= Ursinus the Abbot =

Ursinus the Abbot (seventh century) was an abbot of Saint-Martin at Ligugé, and presumed biographer of Saint Leodegar. He began his career as a monk in the monastery of Saint-Maixent at Poitiers in Neustria.

Ursinus later became the abbot of the monastery of Saint-Martin, where he spent the rest of his days. During his tenure he built a basilica, which became a place of honor to such a degree that in 782 it received the relics of sainted Leodegar. Ursinus also commissioned the monk Defensor to compile the florilegium Liber scintillarum from the patristic writings in the abbey's collection.

An Ursinus wrote the Vita sancti Leodegarii. Later authors tell this story: In 684, bishop Ansoald of Poitiers requested of the new abbot Andulf (684–96) that his monks provide him with a beatific Life of Bishop Leodegar of Autun, martyred three years prior at Sarcing in Artois; and Andulf delegated this task to Ursinus. This Life (or Passion) does not survive, but historian Bruno Krusch claimed to have reconstructed it as the basis of several versions from the Carolingian era. Historian Paul Fouracre initially questioned this account, but by 1996 he had accepted it.

Ursinus's tombstone, in the Latin language, reads:

SUB HOC CONDITORIO SITUM EST CORPUS BONE MEMORIAE ABBA EDIFICAVI BASILICA SCI MARTINI XIII KL NVBS. SIC OBUT IN PACAE, CUI FUIT ALMA FIDES VITA BEATA SATIS MIGRUIT DE SCLO AD XPM AMEN.

== Sources ==
- Defensoris Liber Scintillarum, ed. H. Rochais, Corpus Christianorum Series Latina (Turnhout, 1954).
