= Wulfoald =

Household manager to Frankish king (died 680)

Wulfoald (died 680) was the mayor of the palace of Austrasia from 657 or 661 (depending on when his predecessor Grimoald I was removed from that office) to his death, as well as mayor of the palace of Neustria and Burgundy from 673 to 675.

Wulfoald was the regent of Austrasia during the minority of Childeric II, which ended in 670. Even after Childeric achieved his majority, Wulfoald held significant power, with many historians seeing Childeric as a "puppet king". In 673, he became the mayor of the palace in Neustria, as Childeric had succeeded to the Neustrian throne. When Childeric died in 675, killed by the Neustrians, Wulfoald and his compatriots had to flee back Austrasia. Wulfoald and the nobles proclaimed Dagobert II king, but Ebroin, the rival mayor of the palace of Neustria, tried to place Clovis III on the Austrasian throne to extend his influence. It wasn't until 676 that Wulfoald succeeded in putting Dagobert definitively on the throne. War continued on the border until 677, when Neustria recognised Austrasian independence. Dagobert was assassinated on December 23, 679. Wulfoald outlived his king for only a short while.

Preceded by Grimoald I the Elder	Mayor of the Palace of Austrasia; 657–680	Succeeded by Pepin II the Middle
Preceded by Ebroin	Mayor of the Palace of Neustria; 673–675	Succeeded by Leudesius
