= Begga =

Christian saint

Saint Begga
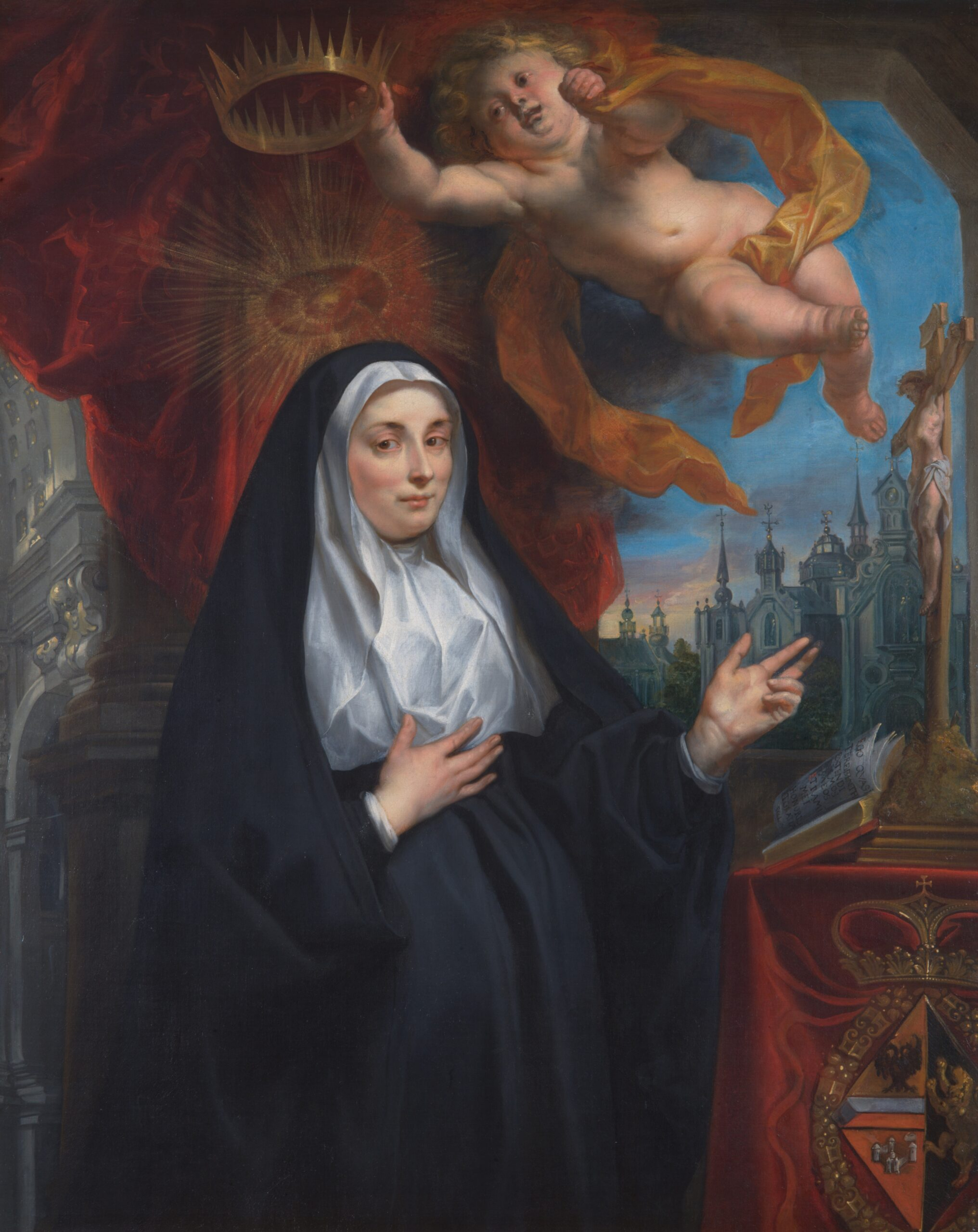
- Born: 615
- Died: 17 December 693 (aged 77–78)
- Venerated in: Eastern Orthodox Church; Catholic Church
- Feast: 17 December

Saint Begga (also Begue, Beghe, Begge) (615 – 17 December 693) was the daughter of Pepin of Landen, mayor of the palace of Austrasia, and his wife Itta. She is also the grandmother of Charles Martel, who is the grandfather of Charlemagne.

== Life ==
The daughter of Pepin of Landen and his wife, Itta, Begga was the older sister of St Gertrude of Nivelles. She married Ansegisel, son of Arnulf, Bishop of Metz, and was the mother of Pepin of Heristal and possibly Duke Martin. Ansegisel was killed sometime before 679, slain in a feud by his enemy Gundewin.

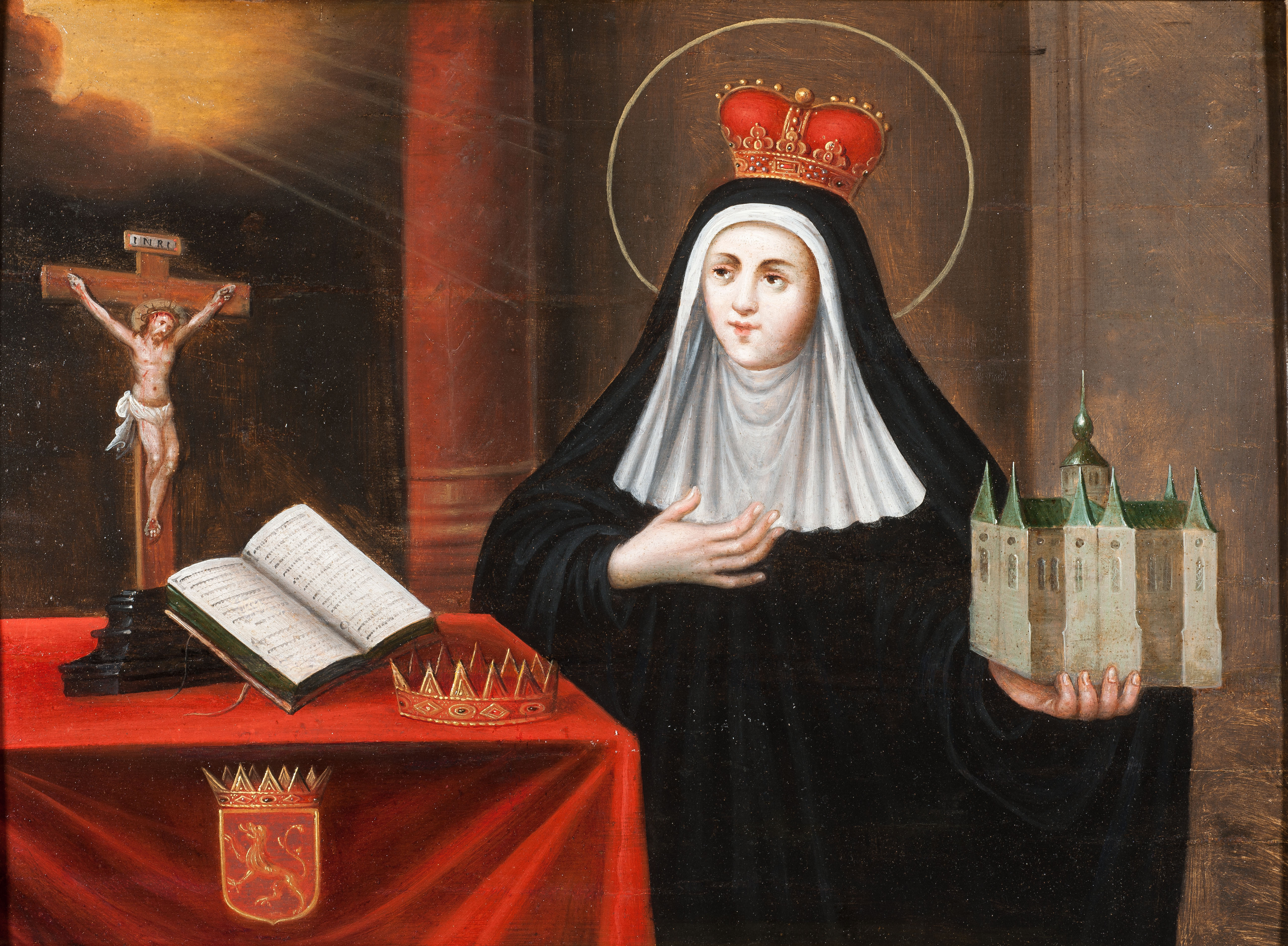
Saint Begga holds a scale model of a monastery with seven turrets, referring to the monastery with seven chapels that she founded in Andenne.

Begga made a pilgrimage to Rome and upon her return, she took the veil, she had seven churches built at Andenne on the Meuse. There she spent the rest of her days as abbess. She was buried in Saint Begga's Collegiate Church in Andenne.

== Veneration ==
She is commemorated on 17 December.

Some hold that the Beguine movement which came to light in the 12th century was actually founded by St Begga; and the church in the beguinage of Lier, Belgium, has a statue of St Begga standing above the inscription: St. Begga, our foundress. The Lier beguinage dates from the 13th century.

Another popular theory, however, claims that the Beguines derived their name from that of the priest Lambert le Bègue, under whose protection the witness and ministry of the Beguines flourished.

== See also ==
- Saint Begga, patron saint archive
