= Pippinids =

Frankish aristocratic family

The Pippinids and the Arnulfings were two Frankish aristocratic families from Austrasia during the Merovingian period. They dominated the office of mayor of the palace after 687 and eventually supplanted the Merovingians as kings in 751, founding the Carolingian dynasty.

The names "Pippinid" and "Arnulfing" are modern conventions, reflecting the families' descent from two contemporaries, Arnulf of Metz (died c. 640) and Pippin of Landen (died 640). The recurrence of the leading name Pippin in the family led the anonymous author of the Annals of Metz (c. 805) to call the family Pippinios, the earliest known designation for the family. In a strict sense, the Pippinids are the descendants of Pippin of Landen and the Arnulfings those of Arnulf of Metz. These groups only overlap via the marriage of Arnulf's son Ansegisel and Pippin's daughter Begga and their son, Pippin of Herstal and his descendants.

Since the late eighth century, the rise of the family has been depicted as the defining feature of the late Merovingian period, with the kings portrayed as rois fainéants ("do-nothing kings"), puppets of their mayors. This theme has been continued in modern historiography. Some have even suggested that the Pippinids and Arnulfings followed a "long-term strategy" to seize power. Following his victory at the Battle of Tertry in 687, Pippin of Herstal extended his influence into Neustria. His death in 714 was followed by years of civil war between his successors. By 718, his younger son Charles Martel had taken control of both Austrasia and Neustria. His descendants are the Carolingians proper, although some historians apply this label as far back as the marriage of Ansegisel and Begga. The descendants of Charles's brother, Childebrand, on the other hand, are known as the Nibelungids.
