= Childebrand I =

Frankish duke (c. 678–751)

- Born: c. 678; Autun, Francia
- Died: 751 (aged 72–73); Autun, Francia
- Father: Pepin of Herstal
- Mother: Alpaida

Childebrand I (c. 678 – 743 or 751) was a Frankish duke (dux), son of Pepin of Heristal and Alpaida, and brother of Charles Martel. He was born in Autun, where he later died. The name of his wife is unknown. He was given Burgundy by his father, becoming a duke. He distinguished himself in the expulsion of the Saracens from Francia alongside his brother when he captured Marseille, one of the largest cities still in Umayyad hands.

He was the patron of the continuator of the Chronicle of Fredegar, as was his son Nibelung I or Nivelon.

Levellain believe that Childebrand was actually the half-brother of Charles Martel, related through his mother. His date of death is also contentious, as some sources place his death at 743 while others claim he lived until 751.
