= Richard Gerberding =

Richard A. Gerberding is professor emeritus and former director of classical studies at the University of Alabama in Huntsville. He taught Latin and Ancient History courses at Willamette University between Fall 2013 and Spring 2015.

Gerberding's early studies were in psychology but he became dissatisfied with the subject and switched to history which he felt offered a greater insight into human nature. Later, he was one of the founders of The Society for Ancient Languages.

Gerberding wrote the entries for "Gregory of Tours" and "Fredegar" in The Encyclopedia of Medieval France (Garland Publishing, 1995) and on "Pippin the Short" in The Encyclopedia of Medieval Germany (Garland Press, 2000). He wrote the chapter on "The Later Roman Empire" in Volume I of The New Cambridge Medieval History (Cambridge University Press, 2005).

== Selected publications ==
- The rise of the Carolingians and the Liber Historiae Francorum, Clarendon Press, Oxford, 1987. ISBN 0198229402 (Oxford Historical Monographs)
- Late Merovingian France: History and hagiography, 640-720, Manchester University Press, Manchester, 1996. ISBN 0719047900 (translated and edited with Paul Fouracre)
- Medieval worlds: An introduction to European history, 300-1492, Houghton-Mifflin, Boston, 2004. ISBN 039556087X (with Jo Ann Hoeppner Moran Cruz)
