= Ansegisel =

7th-century Merovingian nobleman, ancestor of Frankish kings

- Born: c. 602 or 610
- Died: c. 679 or 662
- Noble family: Arnulfings
- Spouse: Begga
- Issue: Pepin the Middle; Clotilda of Herstal
- Father: Arnulf of Metz
- Mother: Doda of Metz

Ansegisel (c. 602 or 610 – murdered before 679 or 662) was the younger son of Saint Arnulf, bishop of Metz.

== Life ==
He served King Sigebert III of Austrasia (634–656) as domesticus. He was killed sometime before 679, slain in a feud by his enemy Gundewin (also spelt Gundoin). Through his son Pepin, Ansegisel's descendants would eventually become Frankish kings and rule over the Carolingian Empire.

== Marriage and issue ==
He was married to Begga, the daughter of Pepin the Elder, sometime after 639. They had the following children:

- Pepin the Middle (635 or 640 – December 16, 714), who would later become Mayor of the Palace of Austrasia
- Clotilda of Herstal (650–699), married King Theuderic III of Neustria

== Sources ==
- Les ancêtres de Charlemagne, 1989, Christian Settipani
