= Vulfetrude =

Saint Vulfetrude, also known as Wilfretrudis and Wulfetrude (died 669), was an Abbess of Nivelles from 659 to 669 AD. She was a daughter of Grimoald I, therefore, a grand daughter of Pepin the Elder, mayor of the palace of Austrasia and Itte Idoberge of the Carolingian dynasty.

She entered the monastery of Nivelles, and she succeeded her aunt Saint Gertrude of Nivelles as abbess in 659 AD. The fall of her father Grimoald I and her brother Childebert the Adopted left her exposed to the hostility of opponents of the family.

She is commemorated on November 23.
