= Nivelles Abbey =

Former Abbey

- French: Abbaye de Nivelles
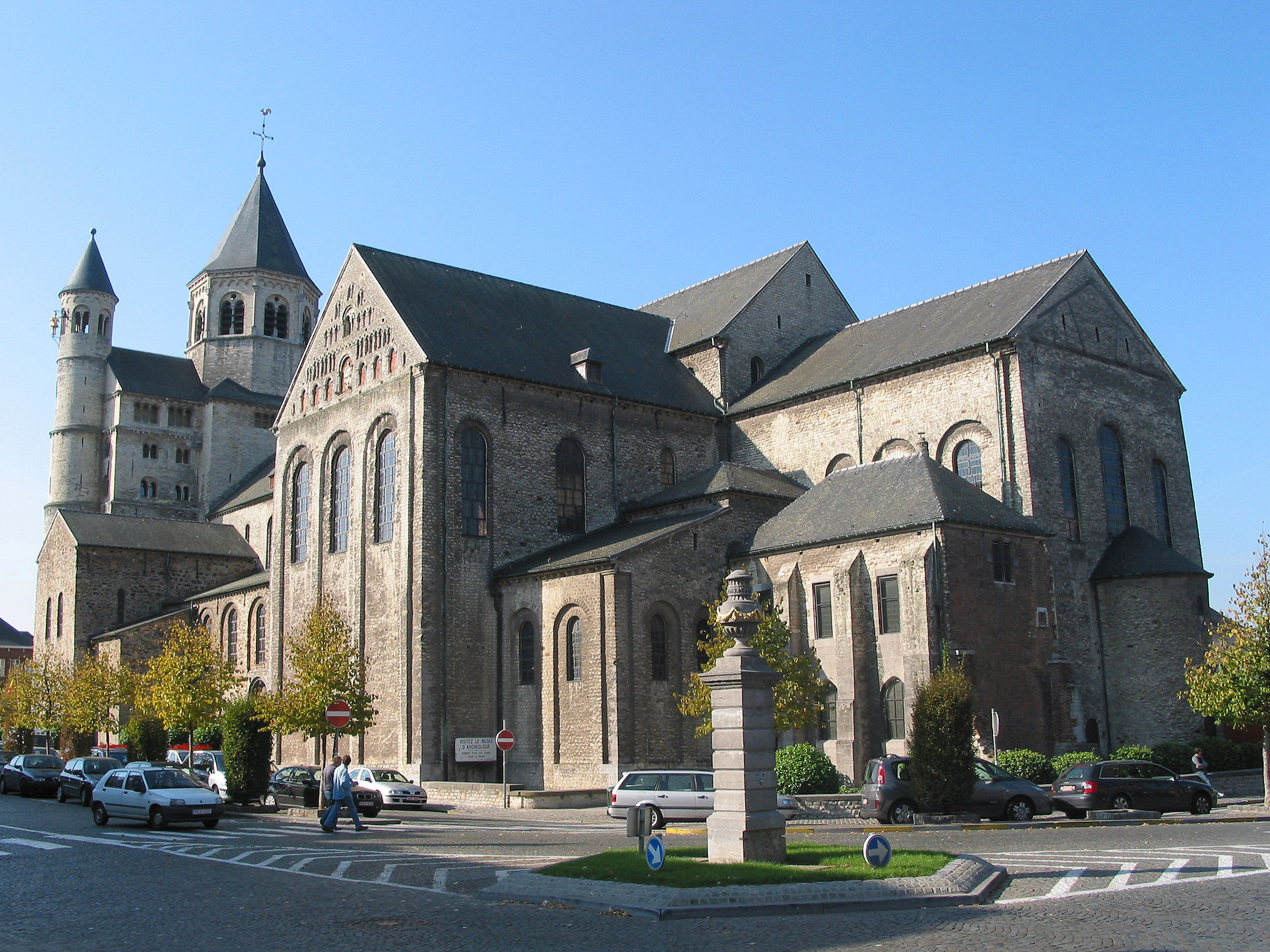
- View of the Collegiate Church of St. Gertrude

- Location within Belgium

Monastery information
- Order: Benedictine nuns; Canonesses Regular
- Established: 640
- Disestablished: 1794
- Dedication: Saint Gertrude
- Diocese: Liège

People
- Founder: Itta of Metz
- Important associated figures: Saint Gertrude, Saint Amandus, Saint Foillan

Architecture
- Status: Destroyed
- Functional status: Heritage Site
- Completed date: 1049 (abbey church)

Site
- Coordinates: 50°35′51″N 4°19′24″E

Nivelles Abbey (French: Abbaye de Nivelles) is a former Imperial Abbey of the Holy Roman Empire founded in 640. It is located in Nivelles, Walloon Brabant, Belgium.

== Foundation ==
The abbey was founded by Itta of Metz, the widow of Pepin of Landen, Mayor of the Palace of the Kingdom of Austrasia, with their daughter, Gertrude of Nivelles. Christianity was not at all widespread in that place and time. It was only the development of cities and the initiative of bishops that led to a vast movement of evangelism, which led to the flowering of monasteries everywhere in the seventh and eighth centuries.

Gertrude's Vita describes how Bishop Amandus came to Itta's home, "preaching the word of God. At the Lord's bidding, he asked whether she would build a monastery for herself and Christ's handmaid, Gertrude". Itta founded Nivelles as a Benedictine monastery of nuns. It later became a double monastery, with one section for monks and another for nuns. However, after they entered the monastic life, Gertrude and her mother suffered, "no small opposition" from the royal family. During this period, trials for the family are mentioned involving the usurper Otto's bid to replace the Pippinids at the side of the king.

There is some precedent for Gertrude and Itta's withdrawal to Nivelles with the intention of founding a monastery. According to Wemple, "during the second half of the 7th century, women in Neustrian-Burgundian families concentrated on the creation of a network of monasteries rather than on the conclusion of politically advantageous unions, while families whose holdings were in the northeastern parts of the kingdom, centering around the city of Metz, were more concerned with the acquisition of power through carefully arranged marriages." Itta's move to start a monastery was thus not completely out of the ordinary, and may have in fact been the norm for a widowed noblewoman.

Upon Itta's death at about the age of 60 in 652, Gertrude took over the monastery. At this time, Gertrude took the "whole burden of governing upon herself alone," placing affairs of the family in the hand of "good and faithful administrators from the brothers." Some have argued that this implies that Gertrude ruled the monastery with an abbot. Frankish double monasteries were almost always led by an abbess, or jointly by an abbess and abbot.

== History ==
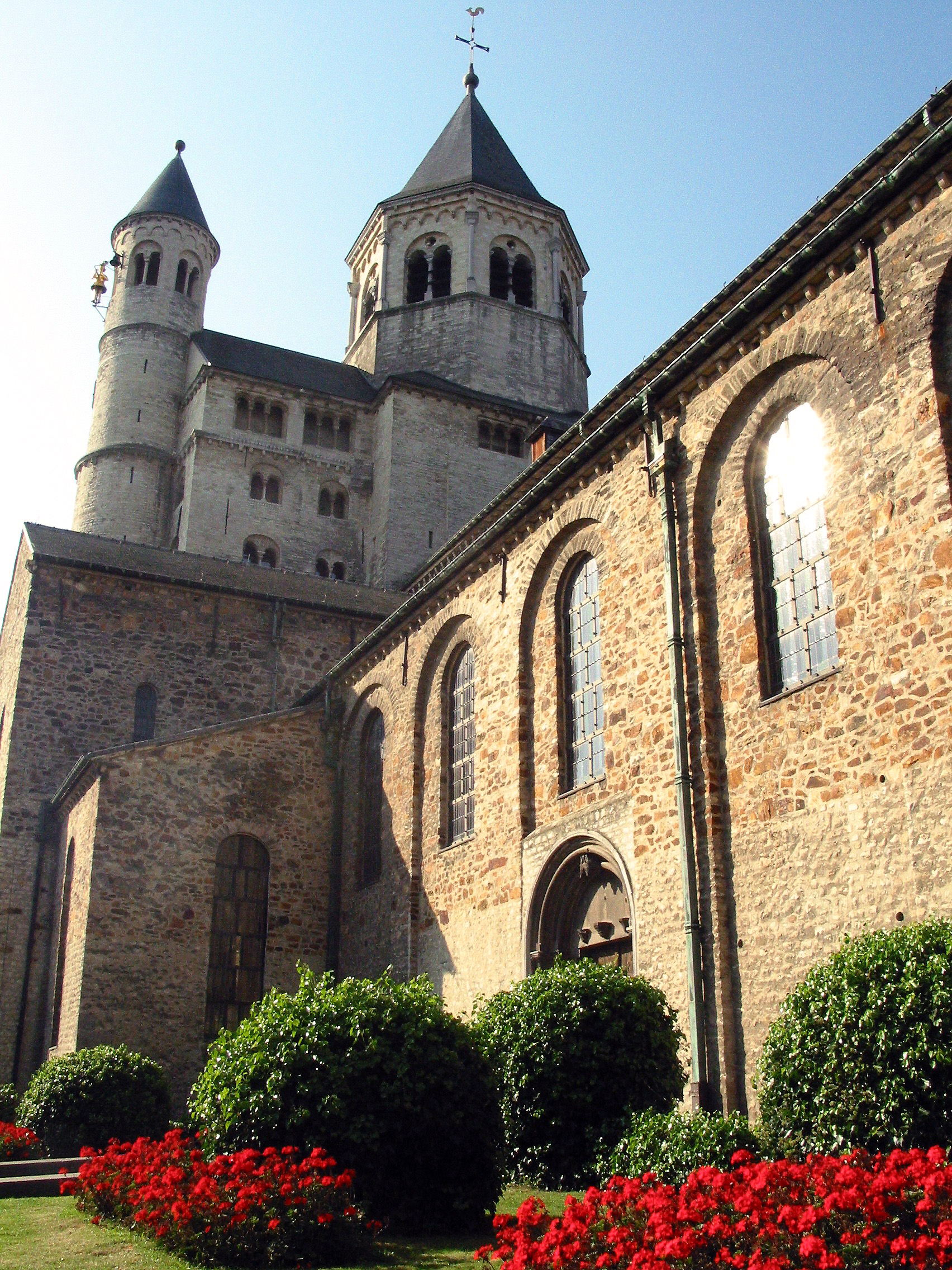
Facade and southern door of the Collegiate Church (11th century)

Nivelles Abbey was founded in 640 by the widow of Pepin of Landen, Itta of Metz, along with her daughter, Gertrude of Nivelles, with the support of the bishop, Saint Amand. The abbey began as a community of nuns; they were joined later by Irish monks from Mont Saint-Quentin Abbey, sent by Abbot Foillan to give support to the nuns. A group of the monks settled at Nivelles and it soon became a double monastery, led either by an abbot and abbess, later only by an abbess. At that point, the abbey came under the influence of Irish monasticism, with its heavy emphasis on a severe asceticism.

In the 9th century there began a process of secularization of the community which possibly ended in the 12th century. The abbey had close ties to the royal family, and played an important role in the social life of the palace. The abbey was part of the dower of Emperor Otto II to the Byzantine princess Theophanu. From the 12th century, the character of the community began to change to a more prestigious one, so that the members became canonesses regular who came from among the nobility, as attested in a document dated 1462. For most of the Middle Ages the abbey remained an Imperial Abbey, a semi-sovereign institution directly under the king.

The abbey was suppressed after the invasion of the Duchy of Brabant in 1794 by the armies of the French First Republic.

== Current ==
The old abbey church, which became the Collegiate Church of Saint Gertrude under the canonesses, was gutted by aerial bombs dropped by the German Luftwaffe in May 1940 during the Battle of Belgium, but it was restored to its 11th and 13th centuries form after World War II. The site was excavated in 1941 and 1953.

Nowadays, the basement of the old abbey holds a number of artifacts and a rich archaeology and is open to the public. The adjoining Romanesque-Gothic cloister dates from the 13th century. A procession is held every year on the Sunday after Michaelmas.

== Known abbesses ==
- Gertrude (626–659), daughter of Itta of Metz, was the first abbess of the double monastery, though her mother may have been the first abbess as well as being the monastery's foundress.
- Vulfetrude, Gertrude's niece (the daughter of Gertrude's brother Grimoald I), succeeded Gertrude from 659 to 669.
- Agnes, who in 691 allowed Begga, Gertrude sister, to take some nuns to found the Monastery of Andenne on Modelled.
- Ada, in 1176 gave the Church of Our Lady of Laeken to the abbey
- Berthe, is known to have sold a wasteland in 1199 to Arnould Walhain, who built there the Tower of Alvaux.
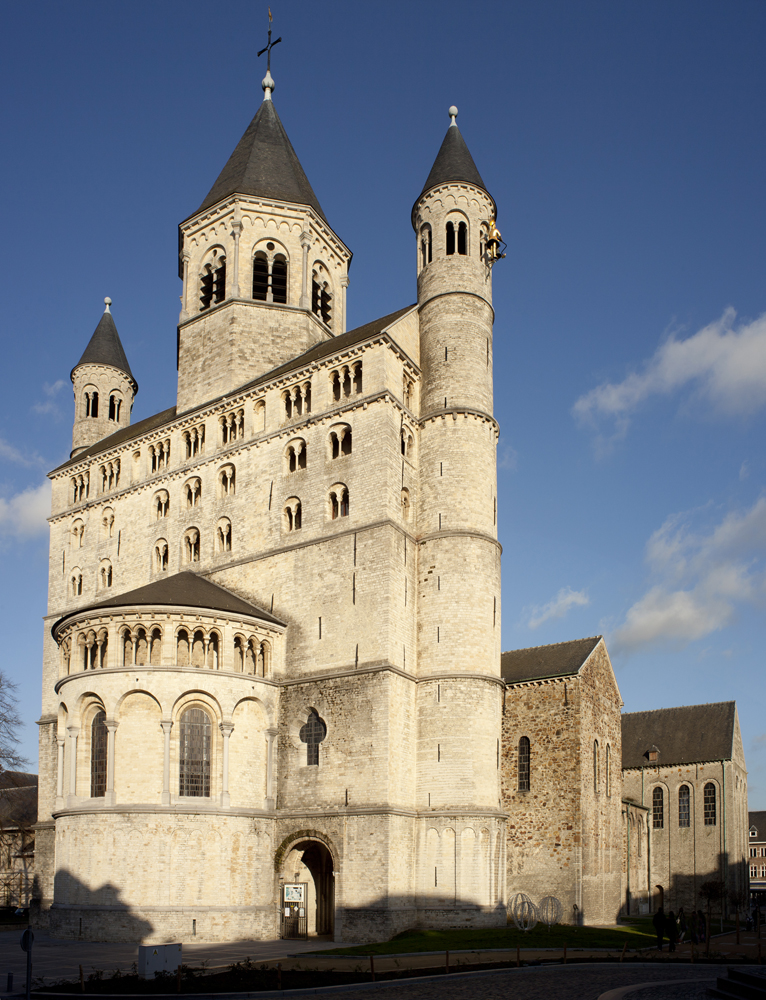
Collegiate church

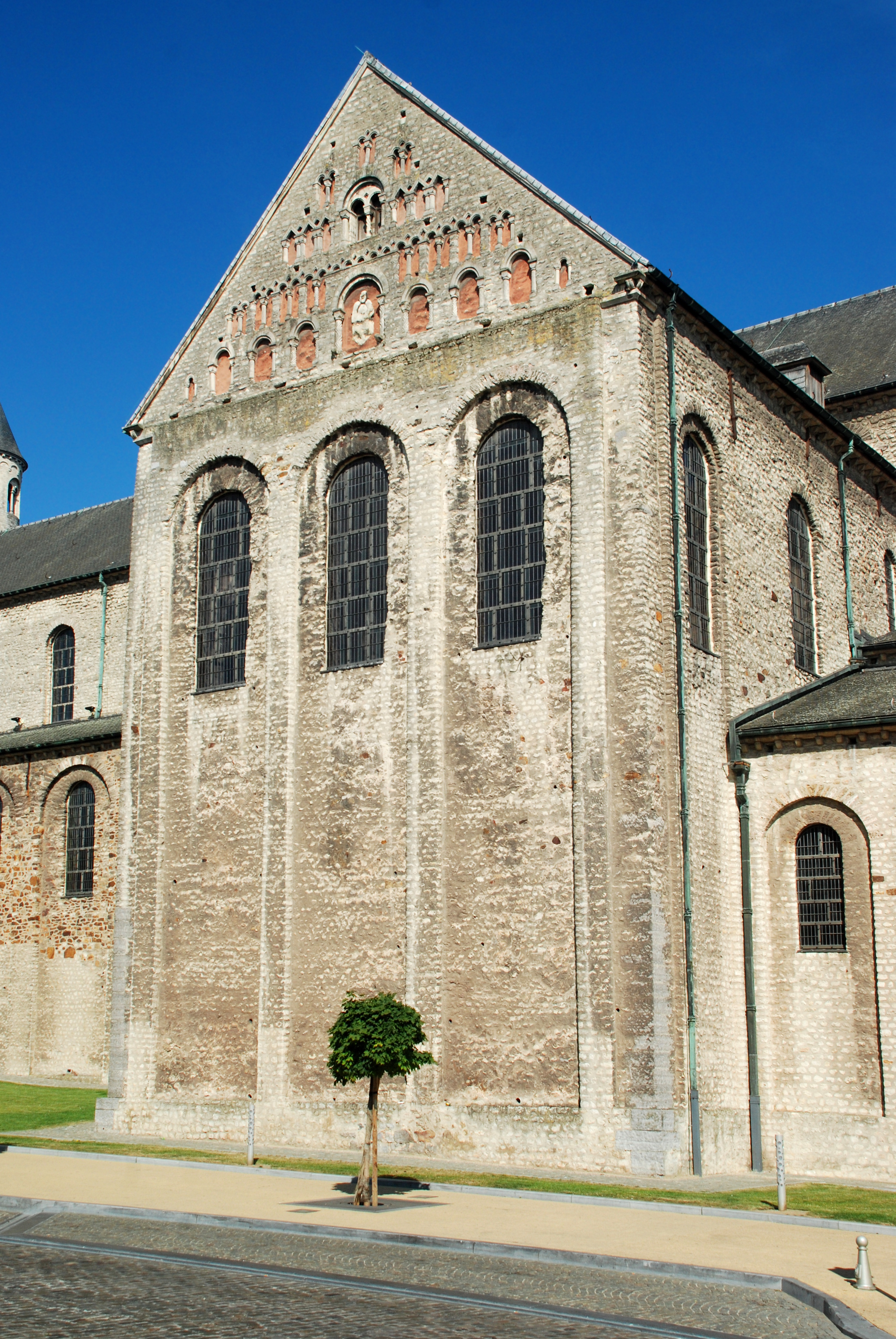
Facade

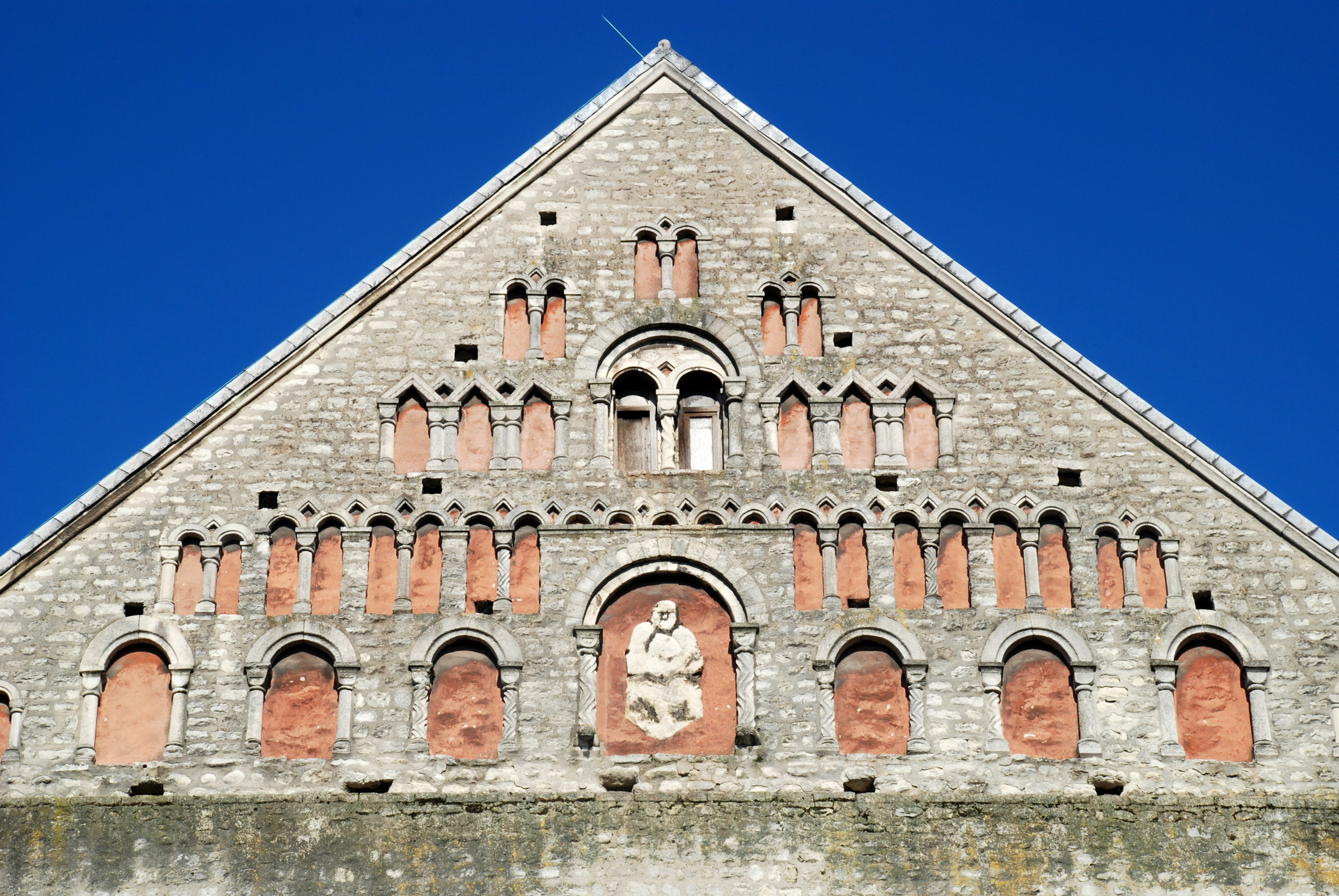
Tympanum

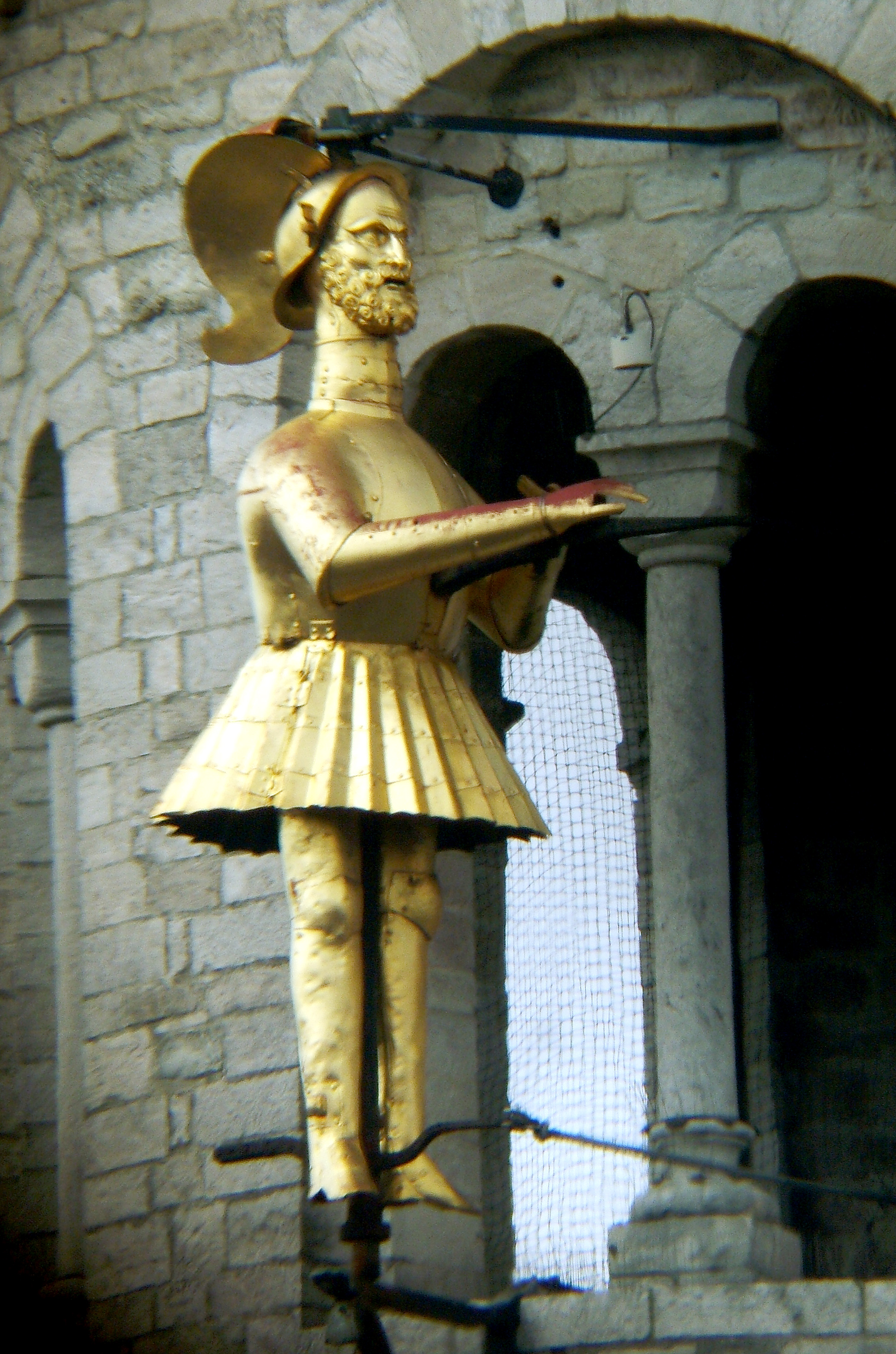
Statue

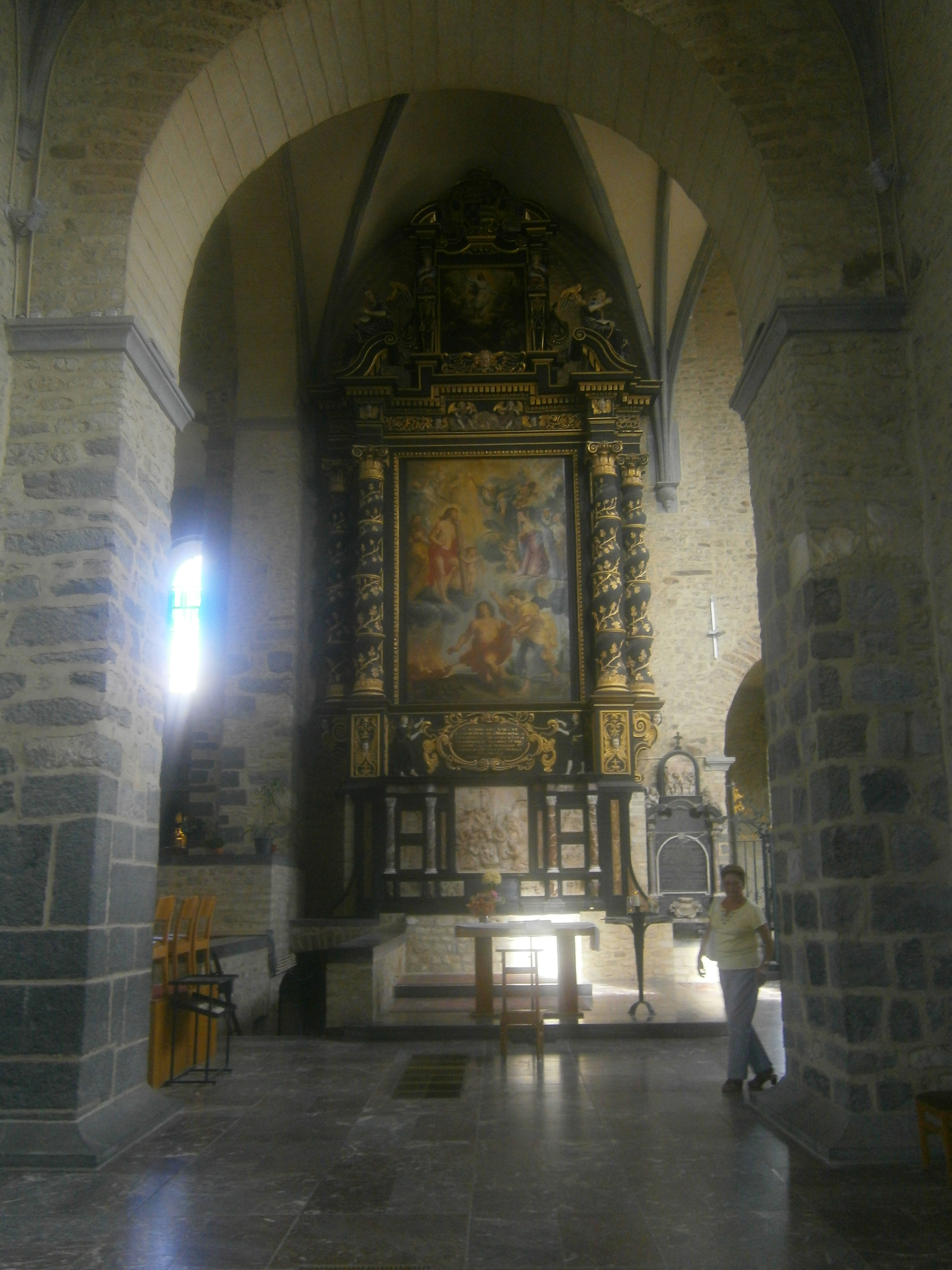
Interior of the church

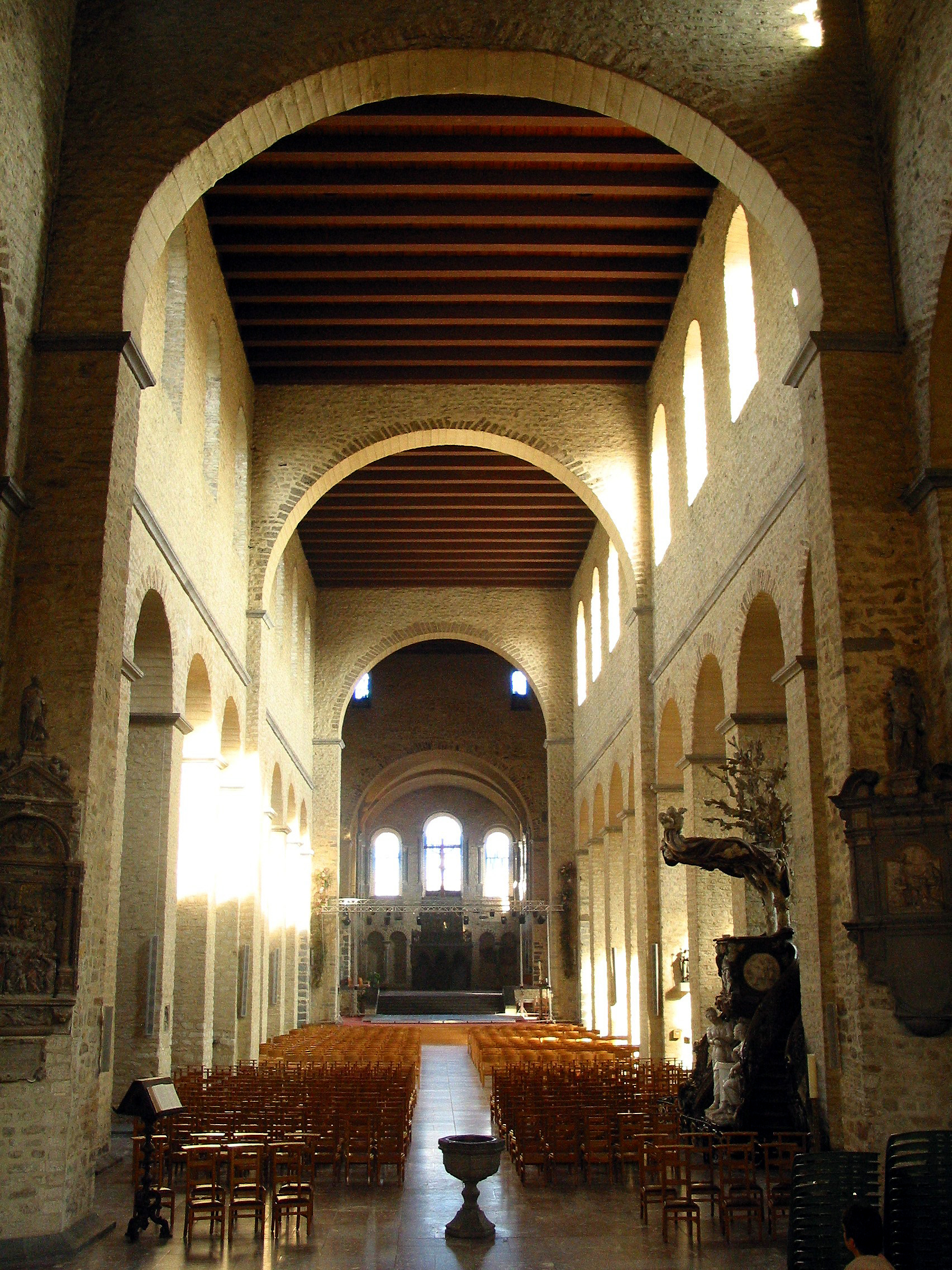
Church nave

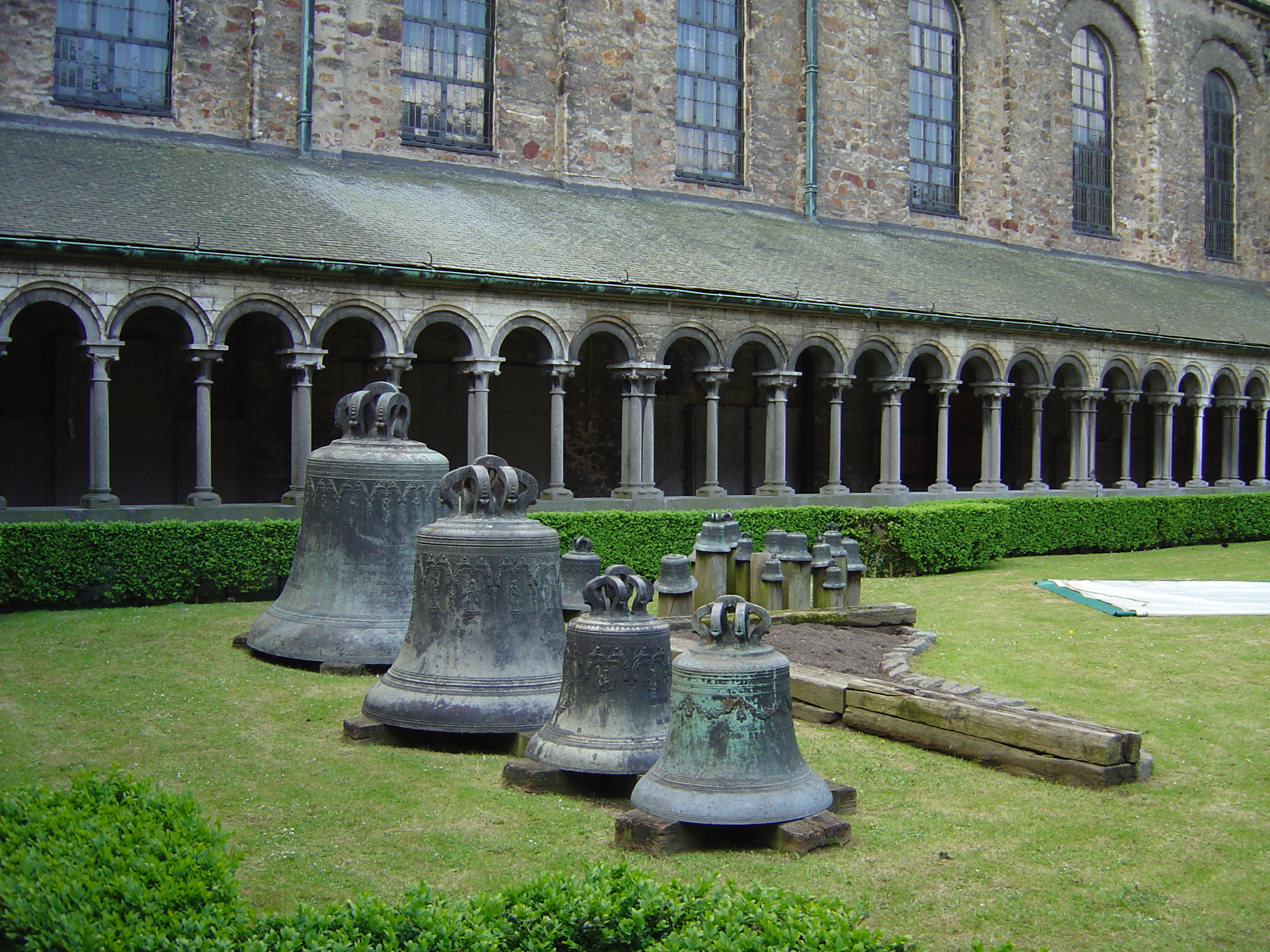
Abbey cloister

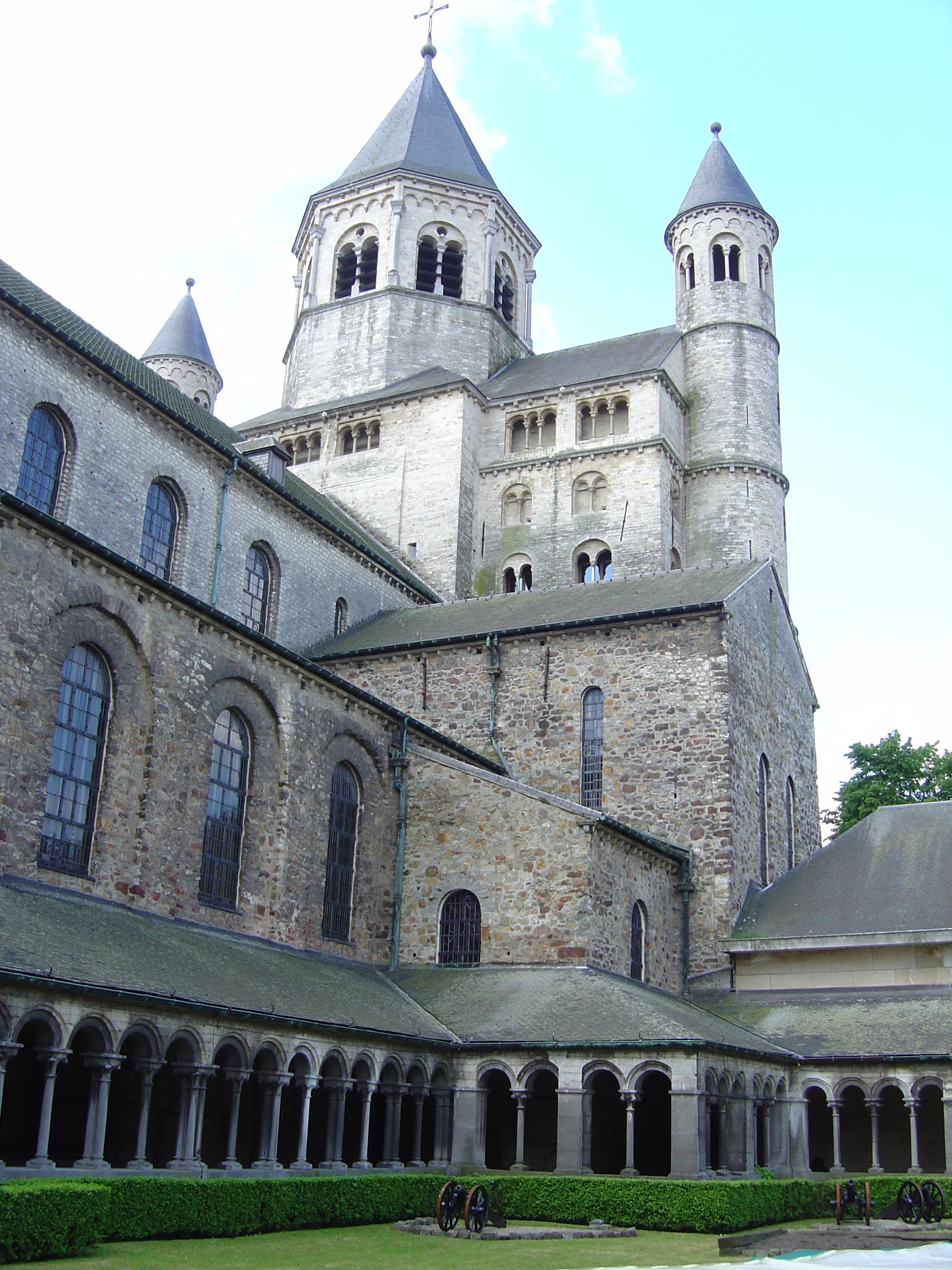
Abbey cloister
