= Modoald =

Frankish archbishop of Trier from 626 to '45

Saint Moadred
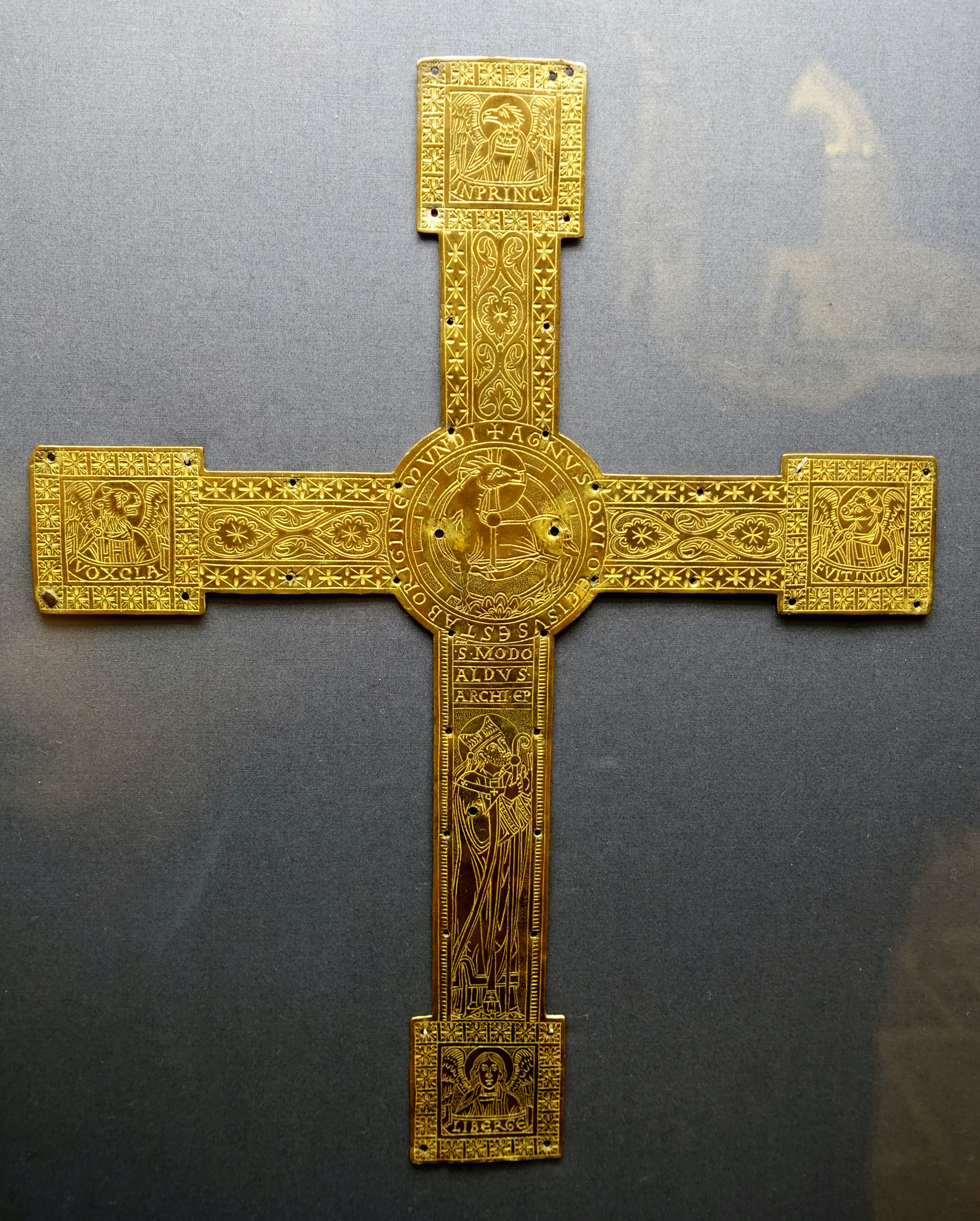
- So-called cross of Modoald

Archbishop of Trier
- Feast: 12 May
- Patronage: Reichsabtei; Helmarshausen
- Major works: Saint-Symphorien, on the Moselle

Saint Modoald, also spelled Moduald, was the Frankish archbishop of Trier from 626 to 645. He is the patron saint of the Reichsabtei Helmarshausen and his liturgical feast is on 12 May.

Modoald was born in Aquitaine, the son of Arnulf, later Bishop of Metz.

He had been at the Court of the Merovingian King Dagobert I, when the King had him made Archbishop of Trier. Germanus of Granfelden was from a wealthy senatorial family of Trier. His father entrusted him at a young age to Bishop Modoald, for his education.

Modoald established the community of Saint-Symphorien, on the Moselle; and placed it under the supervision of his sister Saint Severa.

== Family ==
Pepin of Landen (c. 580–640)	Itta of Metz (592–652)	Saint Modoald (c. 585 – 645 or 648)
Grimoald the Elder (616–657)	Gertrude of Nivelles (c. 628–659)	Begga (613–693)
Pepin of Herstal (635–714)
Charles Martel (c. 690–741)
Pepin the Short (714–768)
Charlemagne (747–814)

Severa (c. 600 – c. 640)

Unknown
Modesta († c. 660)
