= Saint Modesta =

Founder and Abbess of the monastery in Trier

Virgin
- Died: c.680
- Venerated in: Catholic Church Orthodox Church
- Feast: 4 November

Saint Modesta (died c. 680) was the founder and abbess of the monastery of Oeren in Trier, Germany.

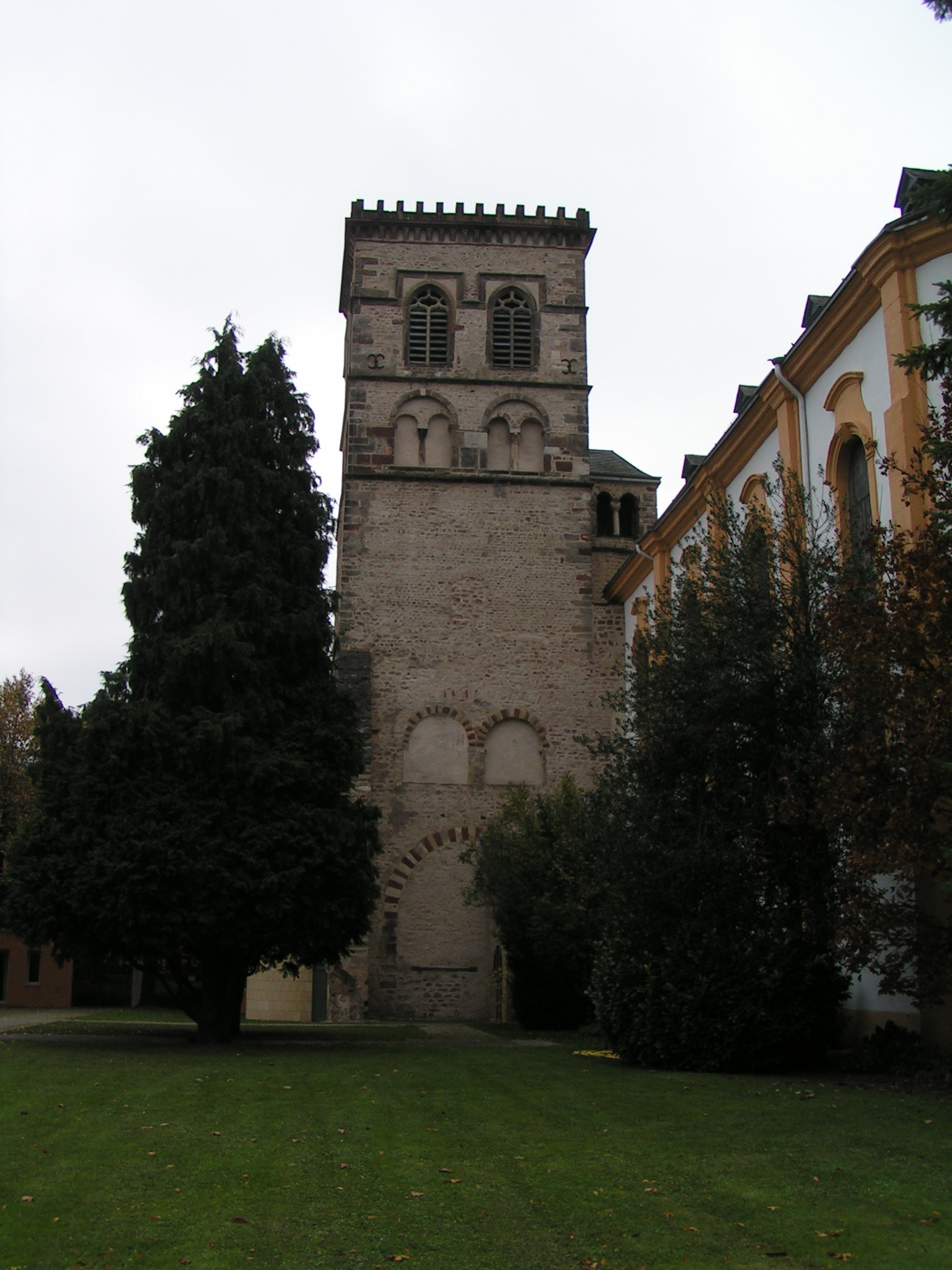
St Irminen Abbey

== Biography ==
Modesta was the niece of Itta of Metz and a cousin of St. Gertrude (626–659). Modesta became a Benedictine nun and was appointed the first abbess, by Saint Modoald, her uncle, for the convent of Oeren, Trier, Germany.

The abbey was built on the Roman horrea, the ancient granaries still remaining on the site and the name is also given as Öhren or Ohren, Øhren, Oehren, Oeren, Herren or Horreum. It was later dedicated to the patronage of Saint Irmina of Oeren, the abbey's second abbess.

== Family ==
Pepin of Landen (c. 580–640)	Itta of Metz (592–652)	Saint Modoald (c. 585 – 645 or 648)
Grimoald the Elder (616–657)	Gertrude of Nivelles (c. 628–659)	Begga (613–693)
Pepin of Herstal (635–714)
Charles Martel (c. 690–741)
Pepin the Short (714–768)
Charlemagne (747–814)

Severa (c. 600 – c. 640)

Unknown
Modesta († c. 660)
