= Collegiate Church of St. Gertrude, Nivelles =

Collegiate Church of St. Gertrude
- French: Collégiale Sainte-Gertrude
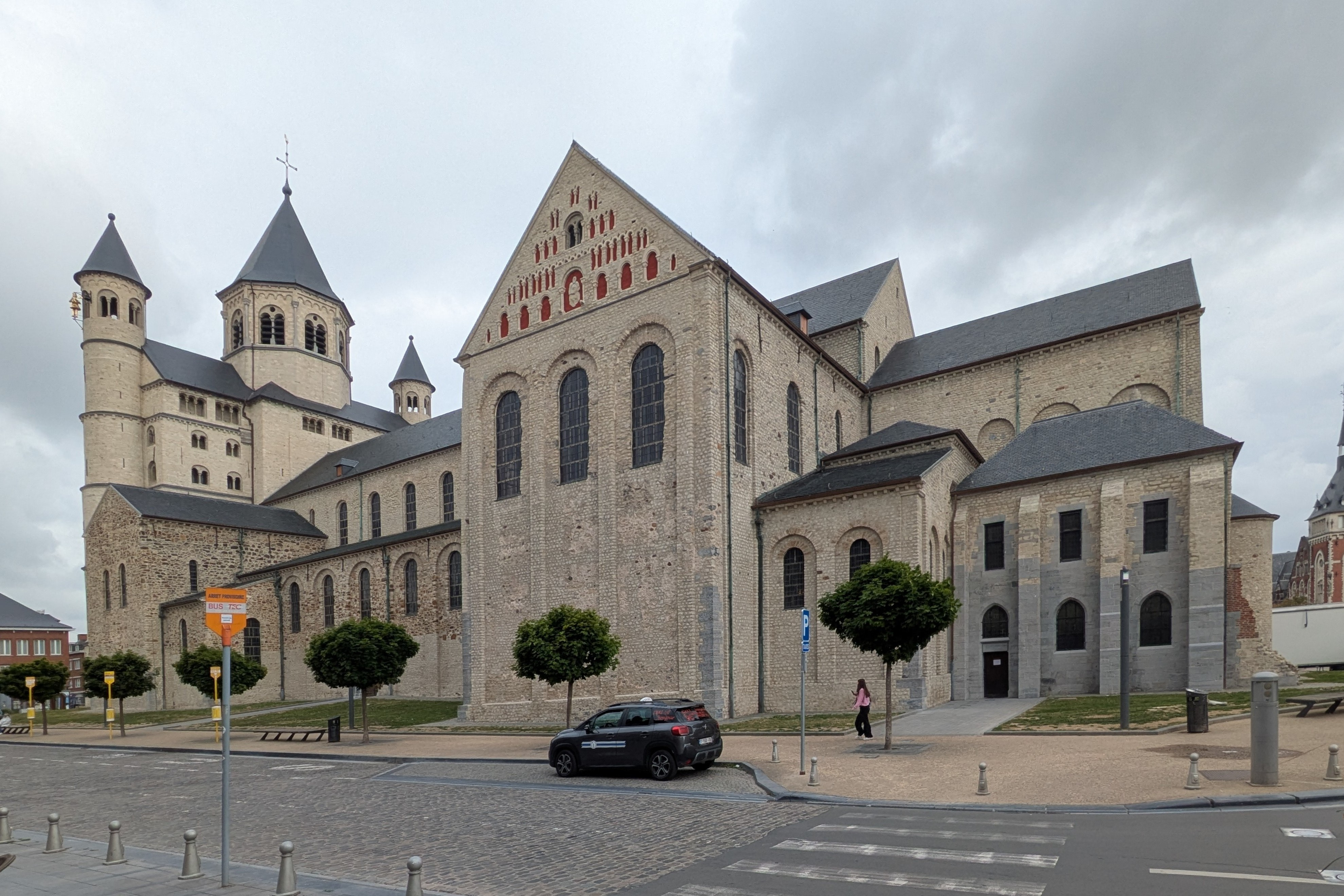
- Collegiate Church of St. Gertrude
- Collegiate Church of St. Gertrude
- 50°35′51″N 4°19′24″E
- Location: Nivelles, Walloon Brabant
- Country: Belgium
- Denomination: Roman Catholic

History
- Status: Collegiate church
- Dedication: Saint Gertude

Architecture
- Functional status: Active
- Architectural type: Church
- Completed: 1049 (abbey church)

Administration
- Diocese: Liège

Clergy
- Archbishop: Jozef De Kesel (Primate of Belgium)

The Collegiate Church of St. Gertrude (French: Collégiale Sainte-Gertrude) is a Roman Catholic collegiate church in Nivelles, Walloon Brabant, Belgium, which was built in the 11th century. It is dedicated to Saint Gertude, the patron saint of cats.

== History ==
This church was built to serve Nivelles Abbey, originally a monastery of Benedictine nuns founded by Itta of Metz, the widow of Pepin of Landen, and mother of Gertrude of Nivelles, the first abbess, in the 7th century. Her remains are buried in a chapel of the church. This structure was built in the early 11th century and consecrated in 1046 by Wazo, Bishop of Liège, in the presence of the Emperor Henry III. It is an example both of Mosan art and of Ottonian architecture.

With the growing membership of members of the nobility among the nuns starting in the 12th century, the community gradually changed its character from its monastic one until it had become a community of canonesses regular by the 15th century, at the latest. At that point, the church acquired its status of collegiate church.

Claudine Donnay-Rocmans writes in the Patrimoine majeur de Wallonie that the interior dimensions recall: "the splendour of the Ottonian liturgy, as people are able to know it from the Abbey of Essen (Germany)".

The westwork has been reconstructed. Its current appearance is the result of a long reconstruction finished in 1984, following severe damage from bombing by the German Luftwaffe in May 1940, in the course of the Battle of Belgium.

=== Noble Canonesses of Nivelles ===
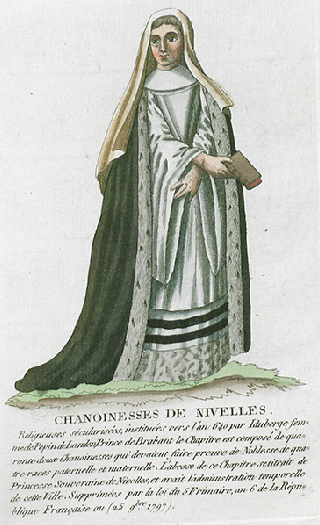
A noble canonesse of Nivelles

The noble chapter of the canonesses regular became very known and had important privileges. Most of the noble canonesses were daughters of important families.

- Ursule, Countess of Berlo, abbess
- Marie Magdeleine de Montmorency, daughter of John II de Montmorency, prince of Robecque
- Marie Anne of Grave, granddaughter of Gilles van der Noot, Baron of Carloo
- Barbe Josephine of Grave, idem
- Marie Philippe of Grave, idem
- Marie Albertine de Berghes-Saint-Winoc (1726–)
- Marie d'Oyenbrugghe de Duras
- Marie Isabella de la Tour et Taxis, daughter of Eugene Alexandre, married later to Guillaume Alexandre de Wignacourt, Count of Lannoy
- Maria Clara de 't Serclaes, daughter of Count John 't Serclaes
- Antoinette Francoise of Arberg, daughter of Count Nicolas of Arberg
- Marie Josepha Taye, daughter of the Marquess of Wemmel, married to the Marquess of Assche
- Isabeau-Angélique Van Zuylen, said d'Erpe
- Helen de Lannoy, daughter of Valentin
- Anna Maria de Robles, daughter of Jean de Roblès, 1st Count of Annappes, married to Conrad d'Ursel
- Marie-Francoise d'Estourmel, married to Jean-Francois de Jauche

== Burials ==
- Itta of Metz, foundress of the abbey
- Gertrude of Nivelles, first abbess of the monastery which this church served
- Ermentrude, daughter of Reginar IV, Count of Mons and Hedwig of France

== Gallery ==
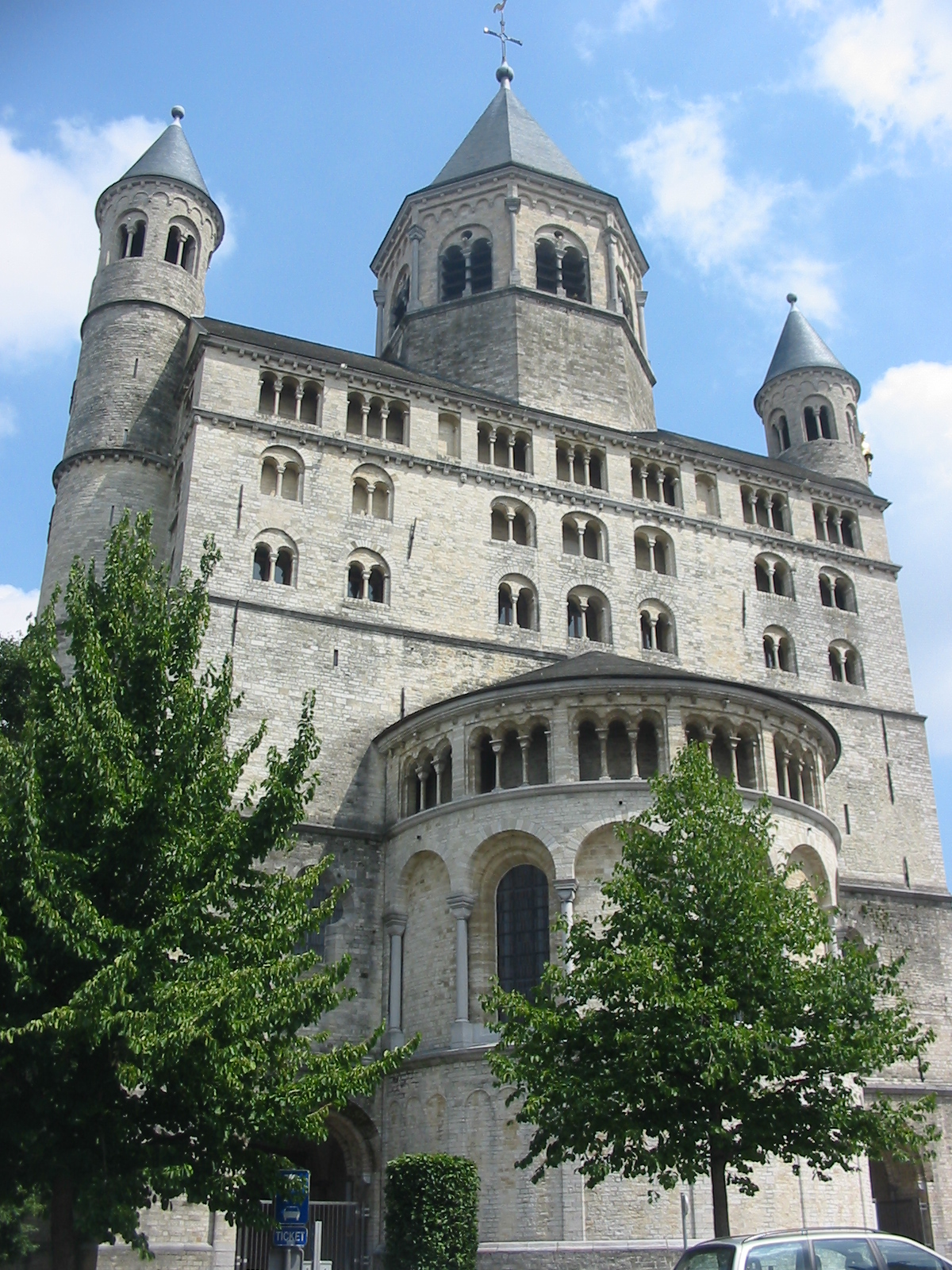
The westwork

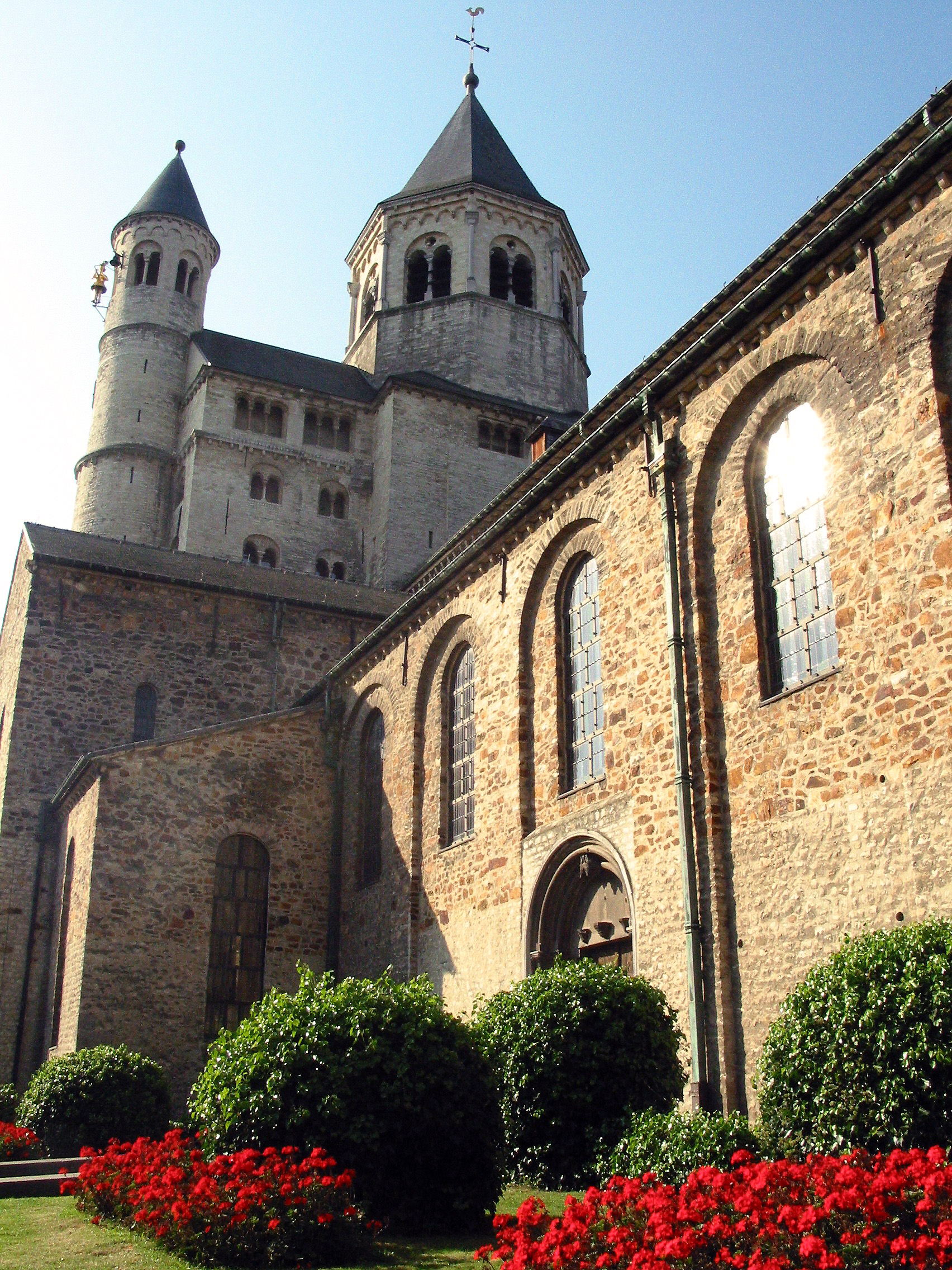
Facade and southern door

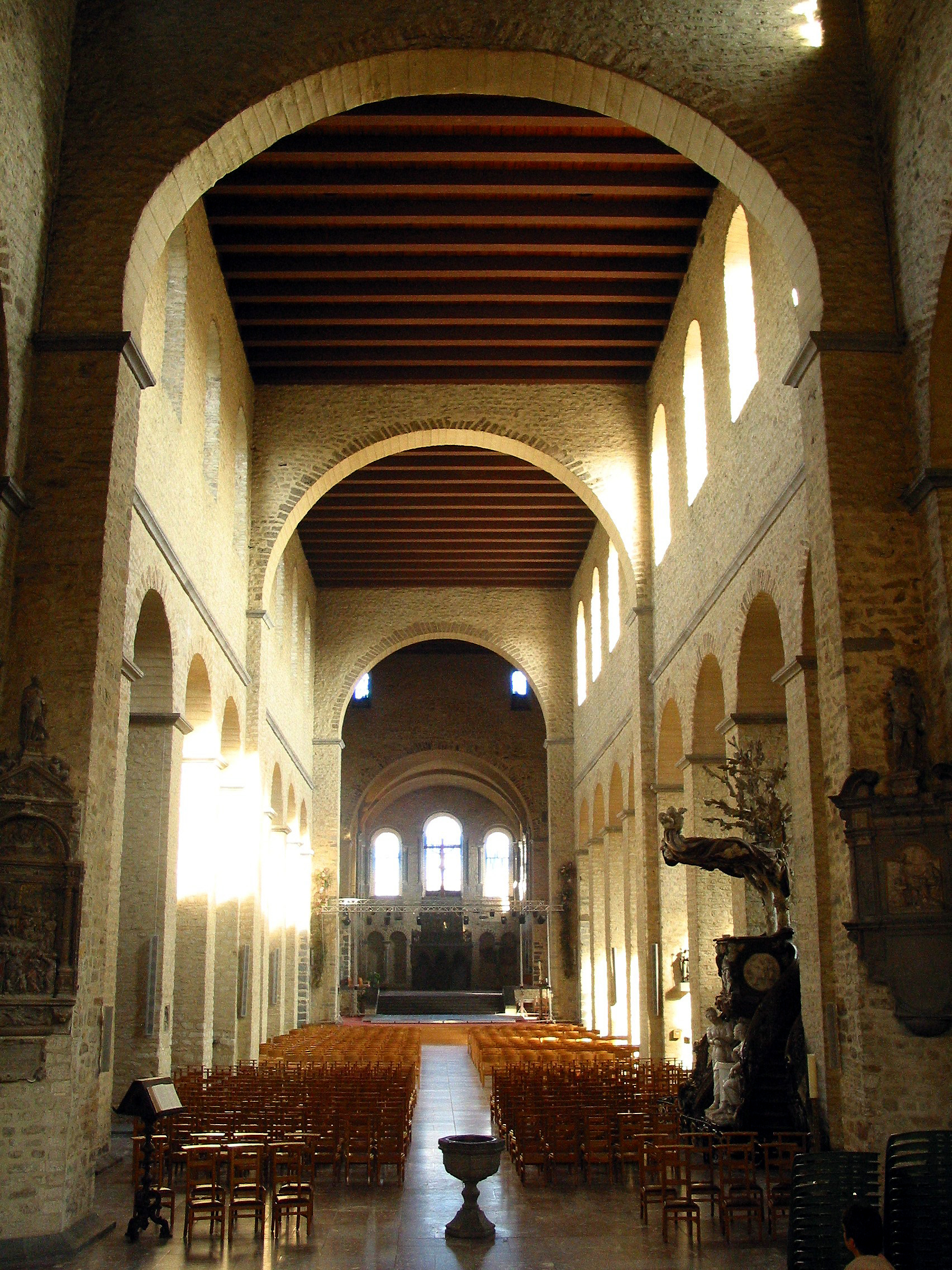
Nave of the church
