= Tower of Alvaux =

Coordinates: 50°37′55″N 4°37′58″E

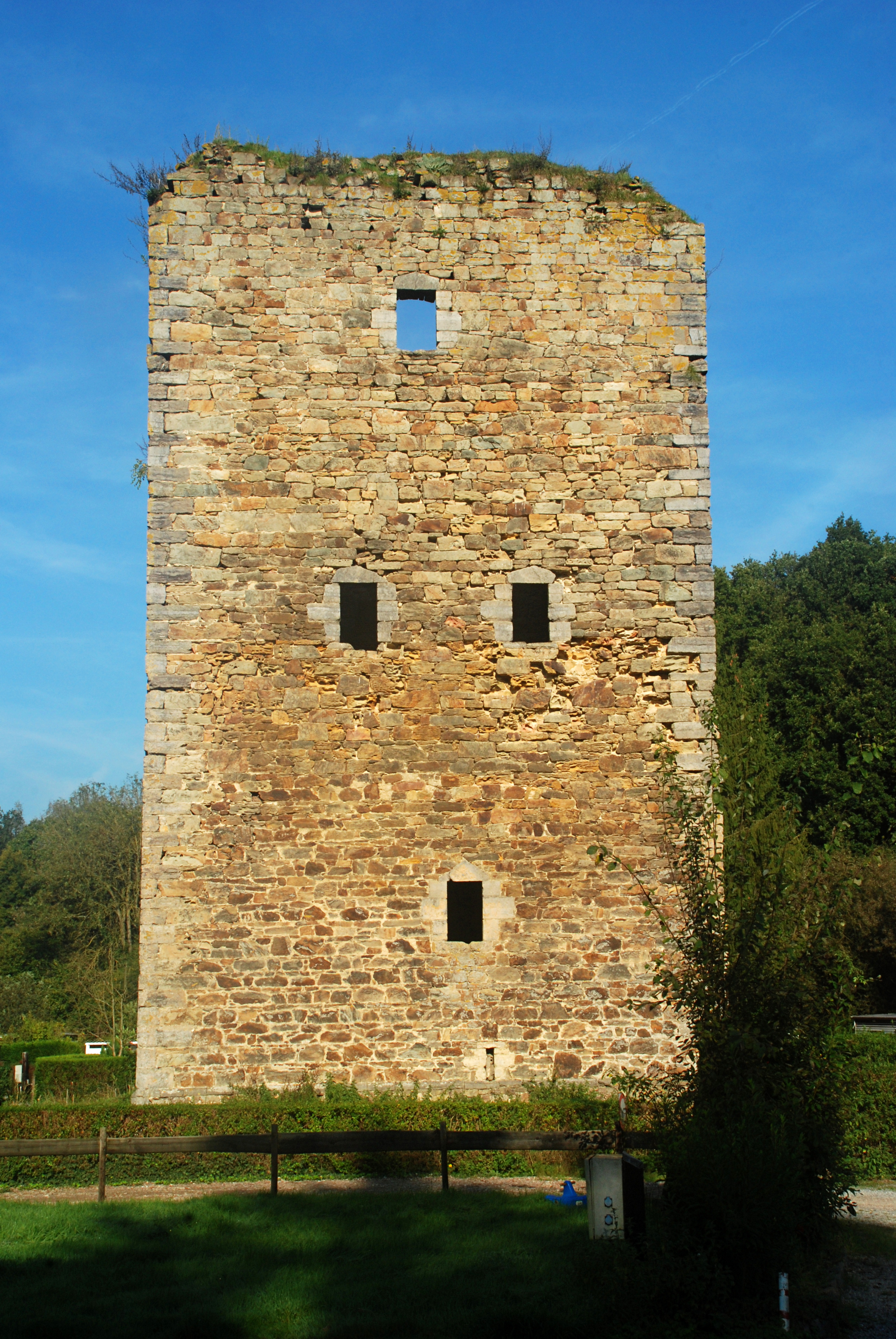
Tour d'Alvaux

Alvaux Tower, also known as Tour d'Alvaux or Alvau or also called Saracen tower, is a plain residential tower of the late 12th century located in Nil-Saint-Vincent-Saint-Martin, a village in the Belgian town of Walhain, the province of Walloon Brabant.

The tower stands in the village of Nil-Saint-Vincent, near Mont-Saint-Guibert south of the city of Brussels in Belgium. Alvaux Tower is a tower house built between 1183 and 1217 by Arnould II de Walhain. The land was yielded to him by Bertha, the abbess of Nivelles, in 1199. The tower was attached to Walhain Castle and had connections with the nearby Griffon du Bois Tower.

When it was built it was surrounded by ditches and equipped with a drawbridge. On top there would have been a pyramidal roof. With this roof the tower would have been some 20 meters high.

Today the tower is situated on a camping ground with access to the tower prohibited and to side the site is surrounded by marshland surrounded by two small arm of the river Orneau.

== History ==
This plain tower seems to have been built shortly after 1199AD for a cadet branch of the family of the lords of Walhain. In 1199, the abbess of Nivelles Berthe sold to Arnould Walhain a wasteland on which Arnould decided to build a large house that was the residence of several generations of Walhain.
