= Gertrude of Nivelles =

Benedictine abbess and saint (c. 626–659)

Saint Gertrude of Nivelles OSB
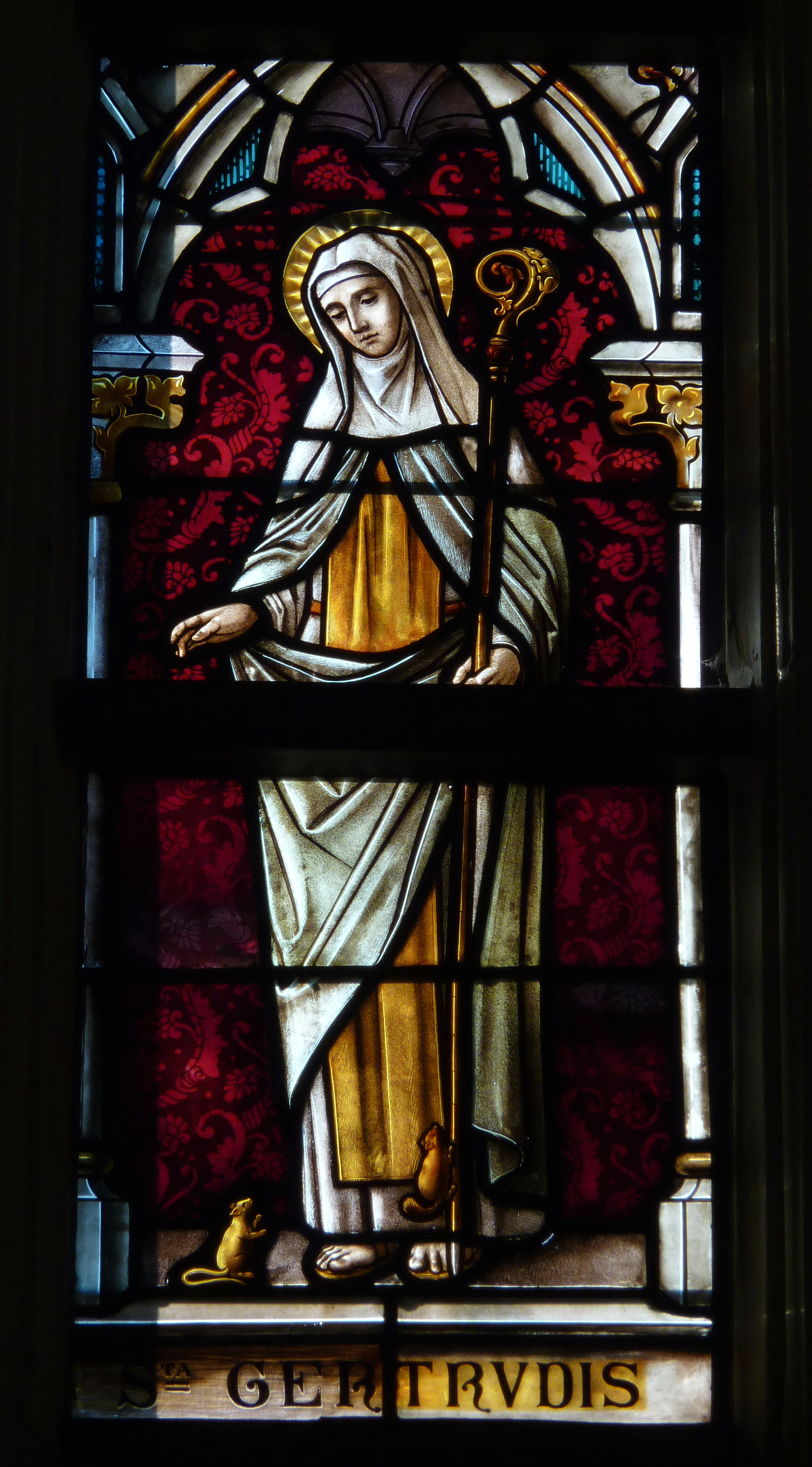
- Stained glass window, Basilica of Our Lady in Tongeren, Belgium

Virgin
- Born: c. 626; Landen, Kingdom of Austrasia
- Died: 17 March 659 (aged 30–31); Nivelles, Kingdom of Austrasia
- Venerated in: Catholic Church, Eastern Orthodox Church
- Major shrine: Collegiate Church of Saint Gertrude, Nivelles, Walloon Brabant, Belgium
- Feast: 17 March
- Attributes: crosier, rats, mice and cats
- Patronage: Geertruidenberg; gardeners; pilgrims; poor people; widows; cats; against rats, mice and pestilence

Gertrude of Nivelles, OSB (also spelled Geretrude, Geretrudis, Gertrud; c. 628 – 17 March 659) was an abbess who, with her mother Itta, founded the Abbey of Nivelles, now in Belgium. She is venerated in the Catholic and Eastern Orthodox traditions.

== Life ==
=== Family and childhood ===
The early history of Gertrude's family is not well documented. The anonymous author of her Early Middle Ages biography, Vita Sanctae Geretrudis, only hints at her origins: "it would be tedious to insert in this account in what line of earthly origin she was descended. For who living in Europe does not know the loftiness, the names, and the localities of her lineage?" Gertrude's father, Pepin of Landen (Pippin the Elder), a nobleman from east Francia, had been instrumental in persuading King Clothar II to crown his son, Dagobert I, as the King of Austrasia. Due to her position at the palace, Gertrude's mother, Itta of Metz, was likely acquainted with Amandus, the Bishop of Maastricht.

When Dagobert succeeded his father and the court moved to Neustria, Pepin and his family (including young Gertrude) moved with the king's court. Thus, Gertrude became introduced to politics during her childhood in the royal court. Arnulf of Metz, Pepin's close ally, was one of several royal counselors who received ecclesiastical posts after a secular career. McNamara argues that Arnulf retired into religion at the time of Clothar's death in 628, but he kept close ties to the family by marrying his son to Gertrude's sister, Begga. However, later scholars have disagreed.

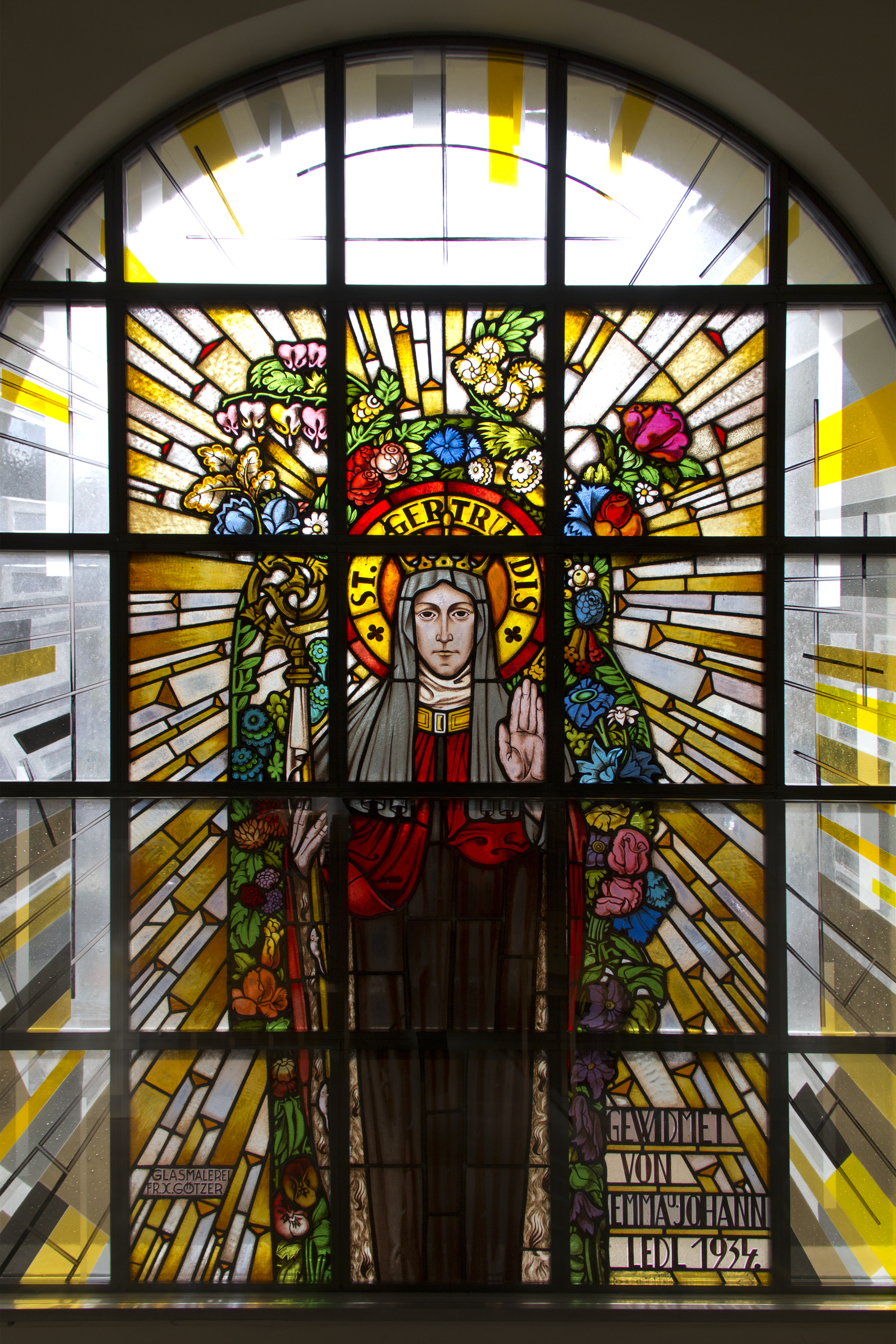
Stained glass depicting Saint Gertrude in Austria

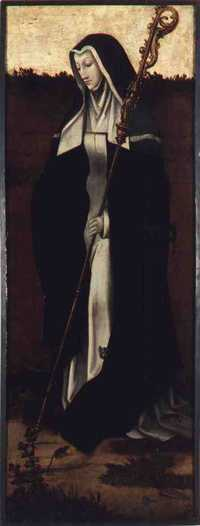
St. Gertrude of Nivelles by an anonymous Flemish painter (ca. 1530)

==== Marriage proposal ====
Gertrude's biography begins with her father hosting a banquet when Gertrude was ten years old. That the king accepted Pepin's invitation to the dinner at all shows Pepin's standing as well as that of his family. At this feast, the King asked Gertrude if she would like to marry the "son of a duke of the Austrasians.... for the sake of his worldly ambition and mutual alliance." Gertrude declined and "lost her temper and flatly rejected him with an oath, saying that she would have neither him nor any earthly spouse but Christ the Lord."

Marriage alliances were important in this era although scholars disagree as to the extent parents or kings asserted power over spousal choice. The marriage between Gertrude's sister Begga and Ansegisel helped set the stage for a Carolingian takeover of Austrasia. The marriage of their son Pepin the Middle and Plectrude later secured the lands of Plectrude's parents Hugobert and Irmina of Oeren between the Rhine, Moselle and Meuse rivers, because Plectrude was an only child. Begga's sons enhanced Pepin's power by marrying women with political connections in the north and northwest. All agree that the girl's personal feeling mattered little. One scholar speculated that if Pepin I had lived longer, he would likely have forced Gertrude to marry the son of the Austrasian duke, thus giving power to the Pippinids sooner to supplant the Merovingians.

Dagobert died in 639 and was succeeded in Neustria by Clovis II and in Austrasia by Sigebert III. When Pepin died, Gertrude's brother Grimoald competed with Otto to become the new mayor of the palace. After Otto died in battle, "the dignity of mayor of Sigebert's palace and control of all the kingdom of Austrasia was thus decisively assured to Grimoald" and the Pippinids.

The mention of Gertrude's decided rejection of her Austrasian suitor is unique for the era. At least one scholar considers it to have been deliberately included by the chronicler as expressing her character. The reference to a prior betrothal to Christ becomes common in later saints' lives. The suitor, while irritated, is not emotionally affected by this rejection.

After Dagobert's death, Pepin returned to the east in 640, taking Gertrude with him. Soon after, Pepin himself died, giving Gertrude the freedom to take the veil and enter the monastic life. Scholars debate the date of the death of Pepin. Some sources date it as late as 650, although others date it much earlier.

==== After her father's death ====
The Vita describes how Itta, in order to prevent "violent abductors from tearing her daughter away by force," shaved her daughter's hair, leaving only a crown shape. This action, known as tonsuring, marked Gertrude for a life of religious service. There were constant requests by "violators of souls" who wished to gain wealth and power by marrying Gertrude. As detailed in the Vita, only Itta's foundation of the Abbey of Nivelles stopped the constant flow of suitors interested in marrying Gertrude in order to ally with her wealthy family.

Susan Wemple argues that Gertrude's story is an example of mothers dominating their daughters in Merovingian times in an effort to "safeguard [their] daughters' sexual purity and secure [their] future." Mothers, she says, were required to raise their daughters to be obedient and disciplined, and the standard "maternal feelings" were "vigilance and worry". The biographer of Gertrude mentions that after the death of Pepin the Elder in 640, his widow Itta pondered daily on what was to become of her and her daughter. Upon the advice of Amand, she ordered the construction of a monastery to which she and Gertrude could retire.

According to Wemple,

"A mother's importance was acknowledged in law insofar as she had the right to assume the guardianship for her fatherless children. In the propertied classes, this meant that a widow could exercise considerable power by managing the estates of her minor children and arranging for their marriages."

Itta lost this right after the death of her husband, Pepin, because their sons had come of age. She still had the option to find a suitable husband for Gertrude. Catherine Peyroux has said that Itta established the monastery in order to protect her and her daughter in the event that her sons fell out of favor with the ruling dynasty, as well as to safeguard the family lands from plunder or seizure through forced marriage.

=== Foundress ===
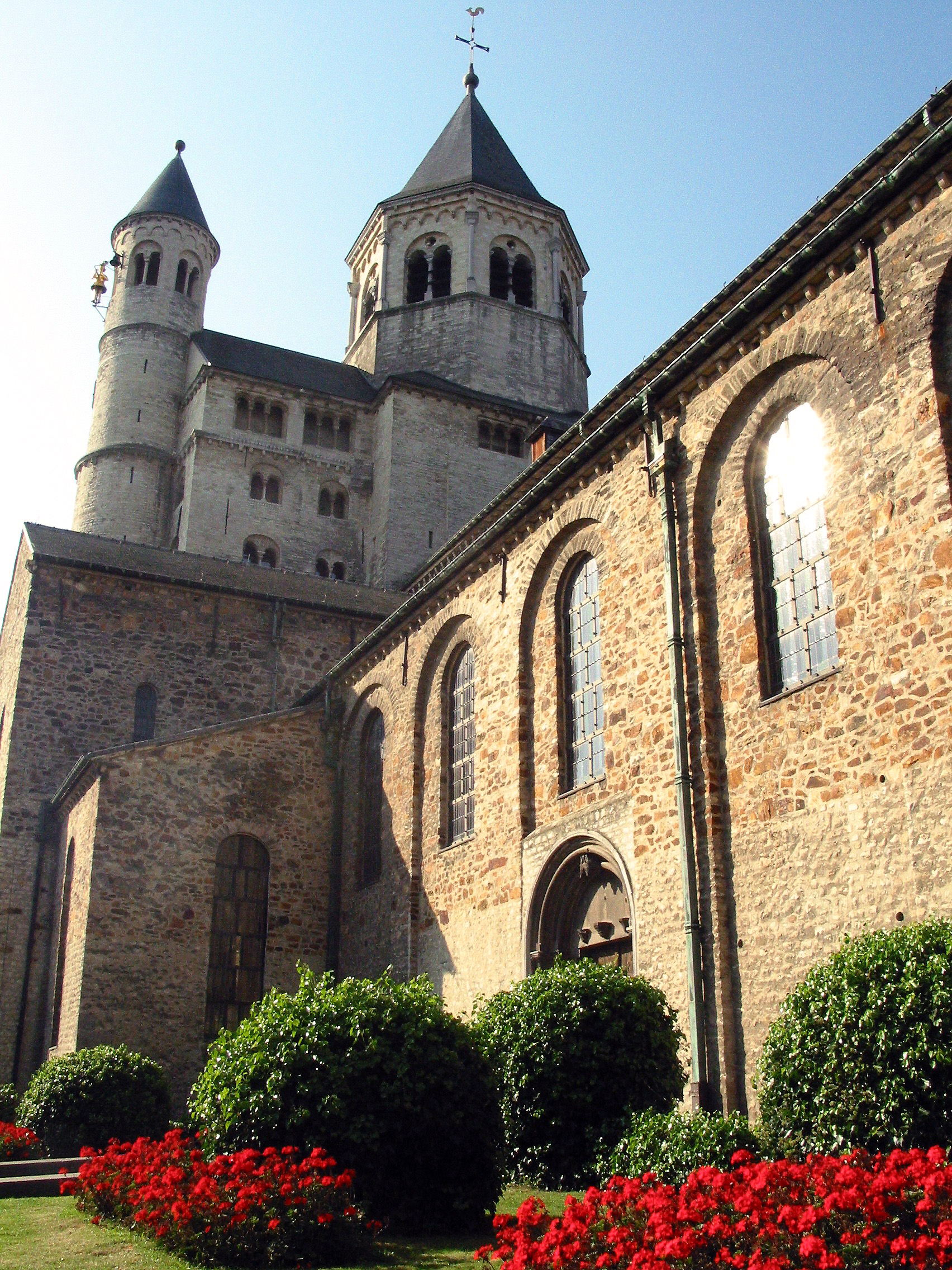
Nivelles (Belgium), fore-part and southern door of the Saint Gertrude Collegiate church (eleventh or thirteenth century)

Christianity was not widespread in Gertrude's place and time. It was only the development of cities and the initiative of bishops that led to a vast movement of evangelism, and a flowering of monasteries in the 7th and 8th centuries.

Gertrude's Vita describes how Bishop Amand came to Itta's house, "preaching the word of God. At the Lord's bidding, he asked whether she would build a monastery for herself and Christ's handmaid, Gertrude." Itta founded Nivelles, a double monastery, one for men, the other for women. However, after they entered the religious life, Gertrude and her mother suffered "no small opposition" from the royal family. During this period, trials for the family are mentioned involving the usurper Otto's bid to replace the Pippinids at the side of the king.

There is some precedent for Gertrude and Itta's move to the monastery at Nivelles. According to Wemple, "during the second half of the seventh century, women in Neustrian-Burgundian families concentrated on the creation of a network of monasteries rather than on the conclusion of politically advantageous unions, while families whose holdings were in the northeastern parts of the kingdom, centering around the city of Metz, were more concerned with the acquisition of power through carefully arranged marriages." Itta's move to start a monastery was thus not completely out of the ordinary, and may have in fact been the norm for a widowed noblewoman.

Upon Itta's death at about the age of 60 in the year 652, twelve years after the death of her husband, Pepin, Gertrude took over the monastery. At this time, Gertrude took the "whole burden of governing upon herself alone," placing affairs of the family in the hands of "good and faithful administrators from the brothers." Some have argued that this implies that Gertrude ruled the monastery with an abbot. Frankish double monasteries were almost always led by an abbess, or jointly by an abbess and abbot. However, when Suzanne Wemple used Nivelles as an example of the latter, claiming that Gertrude ruled Nivelles jointly with Amand "around 640," she casts doubt on her own theory by mistaking the date. Many later scholars date the foundation of Nivelles between 647 and 650.

=== Monastic life ===
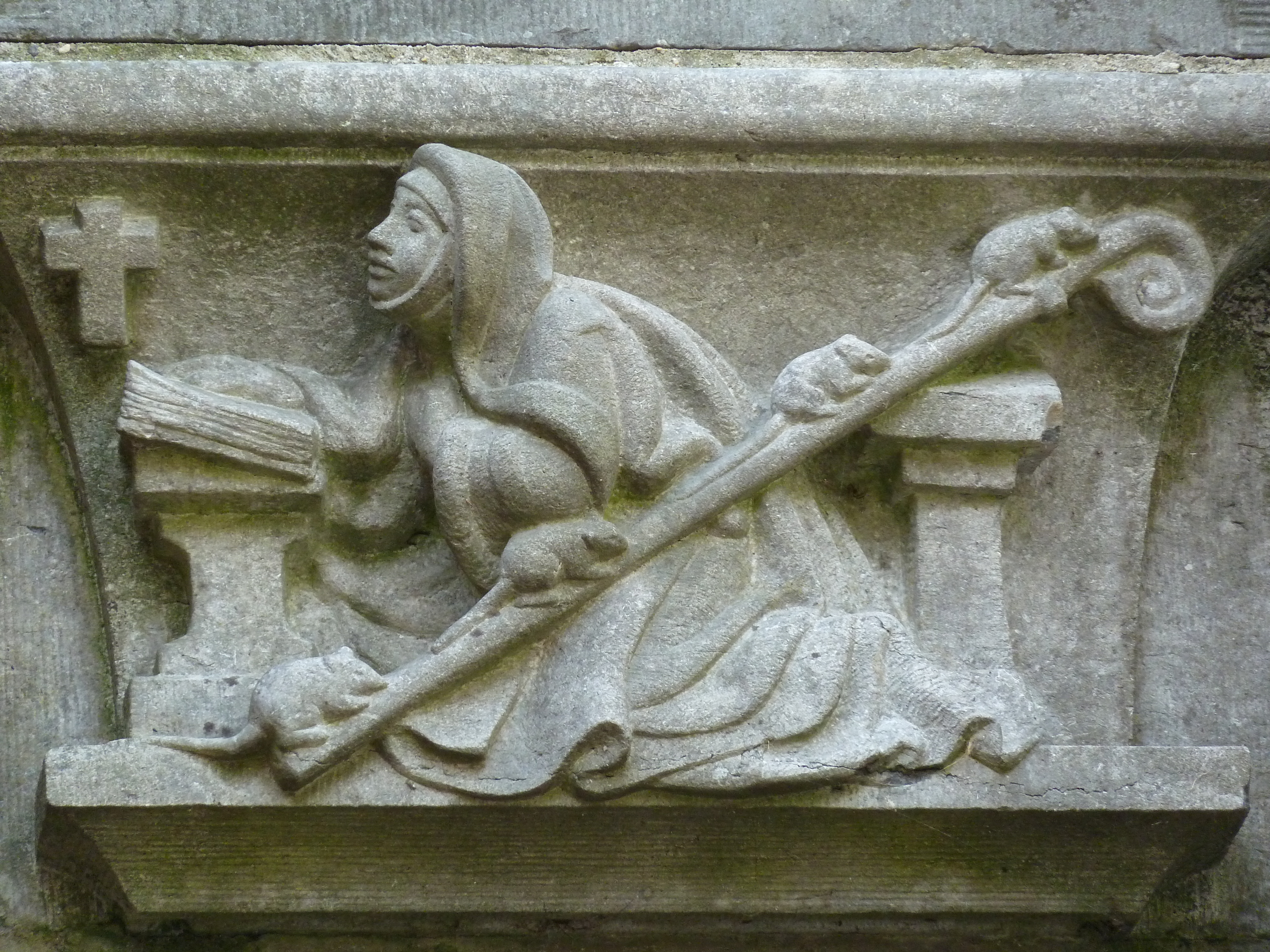
Console Oudegracht 321

The Vita states that in Gertrude, "temperance of character, the sobriety of her heart and the moderation of her words she anticipated maturity." She was "an intelligent young woman, scholarly and charitable, devoting herself to the sick, elderly, and poor," and as knowing much of the scripture by memory. Gertrude also memorized passages and books on divine law, and she "openly disclosed the hidden mysteries of allegory to her listeners." Her Vita describes Gertrude as building churches, and taking care of orphans, widows, captives, and pilgrims.

Upon becoming abbess, Gertrude "obtained through her envoys men of good reputation, relics of saints and holy books from Rome, and from regions across the sea, experienced men for the teaching of the divine law and to practice the chants for herself and her people."

Fouracre and Gerberding assert that the men from across the sea are from Britain and Ireland and also highlight this as an example of the importance of Rome to the Franks long before Charlemagne ever had a relationship with the Pope. This is supported by Peyroux, Wemple, and the ancient Chronicles of Fredegar.

She welcomed foreigners, lay or religious. She especially welcomed Irish monks who, since the sixth century, traveled to evangelize. Among the numerous pilgrims that visited the monastery of Nivelles were the two brothers, Foillan and Ultan, both Irish monks on their way from Rome to Peronne, where their brother Fursey, lay buried. According to Wemple, "The Irish monasteries, with the ancient tradition of oral learning, were at the time the most distinguished centers of scholarship".

=== Death of Foillan ===
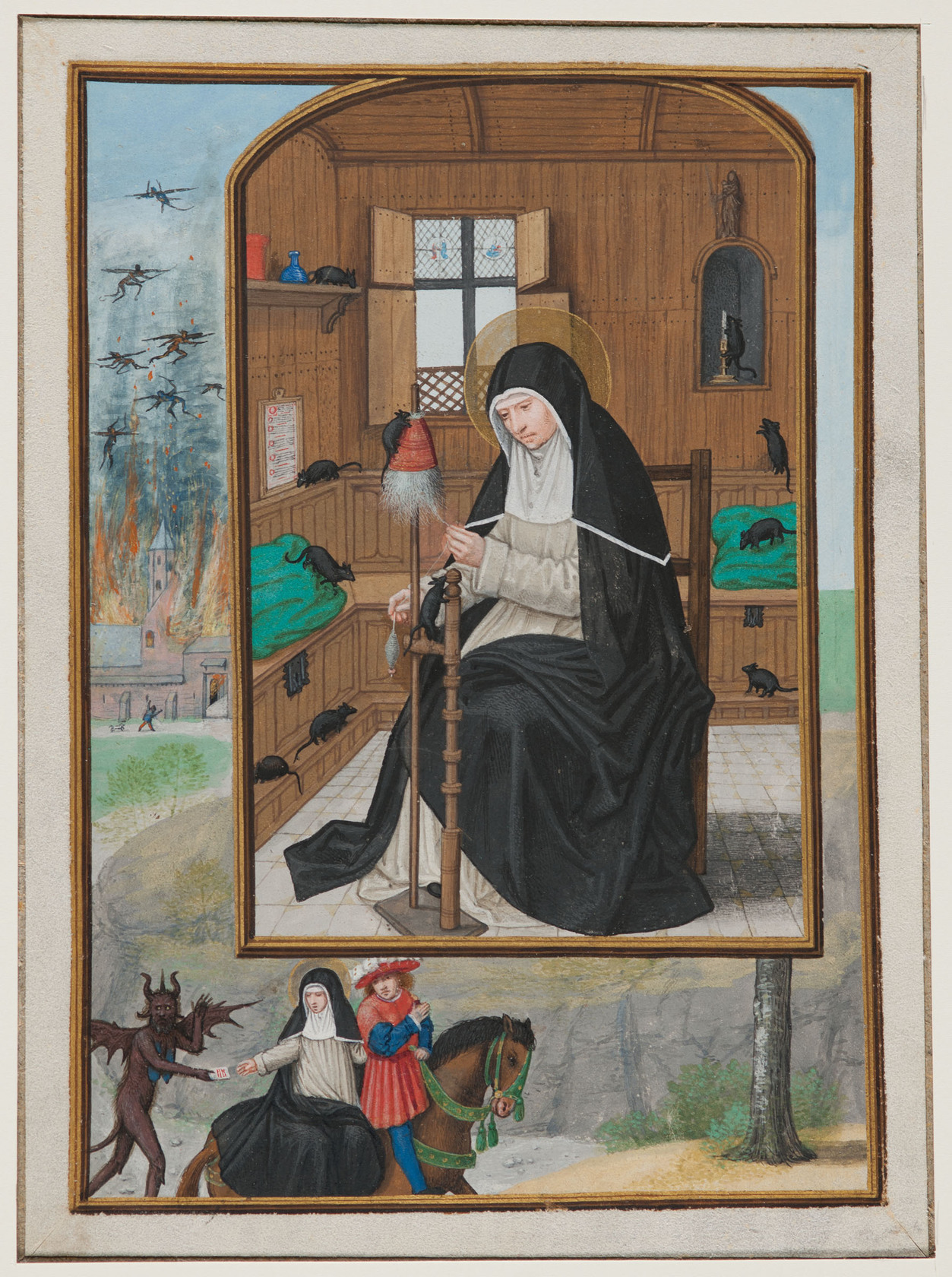
St. Gertrude de Nivelles, from the Hours of Cardinal Albrecht of Brandenburg by Simon Bening

In the Additum Additamentum Nivialense de Fuilano, an addendum to the Vita Sanctae Gertrudis, there is a story about several events involving Irish monks led by Foillan that involve Gertrude and the Abbey of Nivelles.

Before the foundation of Nivelles, Irish monks led by Foillan traveled to Francia, from Fursey's monastery in Ireland to escape pagan raids. They were received by Erchinoald, mayor of the palace, but were later expelled by him and moved to live with Itta and Gertrude. Grimoald and the Pippinids were happy to accept them and built the monastery of Berbrona for them with the help of Itta and Gertrude. In other works this monastery is referred to as Fosses. There is much praise of Gertrude in the text.

Sometime later, Foillan went on a journey, saying mass in Nivelles before leaving. Ian Wood says that the purpose of Foillan's journey was to visit his benefactors, but he provides no evidence for this claim other than a citation of the Additamentum. After only a day of traveling, Foillan and his three companions were betrayed and murdered by a man who offered them shelter for the night in his house and then sold their belongings. Upon learning that Foillan did not reach his destination, the brothers of his monastery began to search for him. However, it was Gertrude who succeeded in finding Foillan's body 77 days after he was murdered, on the anniversary of his brother Fursey's death. The four bodies were immediately brought to Nivelles.

"Dido, Bishop of Poitiers, and the mayor of the palace, Grimoald, a man of illustrious standing," arrived by chance, or, as the text hints, divine intervention at Nivelles shortly before the bodies and the two men carried Foillan into Nivelles "on their own shoulders." Foillan's body was then taken to his own monastery "and when noblemen had flocked from all sides to meet him and carried him on their own shoulders" he was buried at Fosses.

=== Miracles ===
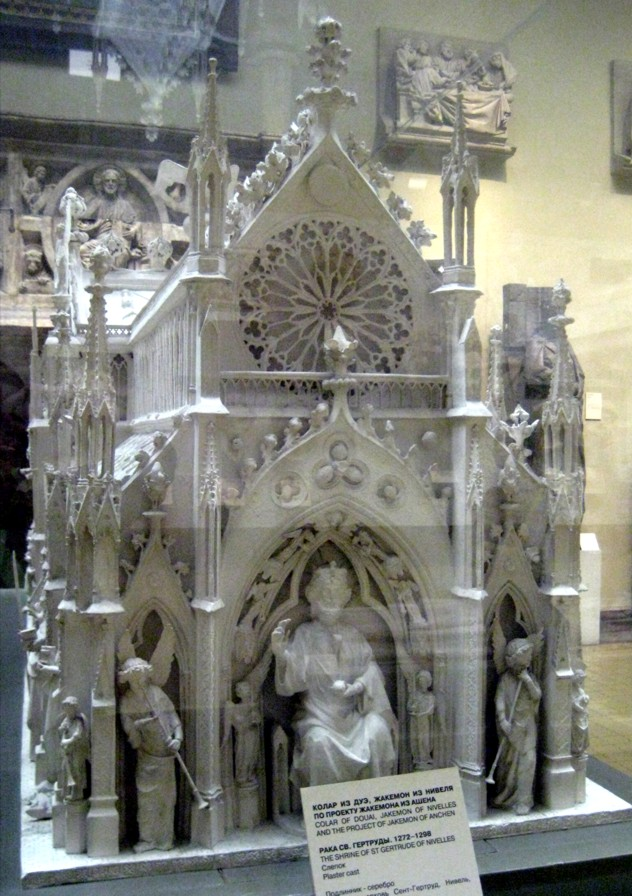
Shrine of St. Gertrude of Nivelles, originally made in 1272–1298 – this reproduction in the Pushkin Museum was cast from the original because in 1940 a German bomb smashed the original reliquary into 337 fragments that subsequently was rebuilt

==== Miraculous vision ====
The first miracle attributed to Gertrude in the Vita takes place at the altar of Pope Sixtus II the Martyr as Gertrude was standing in prayer. "She saw descending above her a flaming pellucid sphere such that the whole basilica was illuminated by its brightness." The vision persisted for about half an hour and later was revealed to some of the sisters at the monastery. The anonymous author of the Vita believes that this vision represents a "visitation of the True Light."

==== Salvation of the sailors ====
The second miracle attributed to Gertrude in the Vita took place as the anonymous author and his friend were peacefully sailing over the sea on the monastery's business. This account is felt by some to indicate that the author was an Irish monk. In the account, an incredible storm appears as well as a sea monster, causing great despair as "the sailors... turned to their idols," evidence of the persistence of paganism at the time. In desperation, the author's friend cries out to Gertrude to save himself and his companions from the storm and monster. Immediately the storm subsides and the monster dives back into the deep.

=== Appointment of Wulfetrud ===
Before her death, Gertrude appointed her niece Wulfetrud as Abbess of Nivelles. Wulfetrud's position was precarious because her father, Grimoald I, had usurped the Austrasian throne. According to Ian Wood, "It was the Neustrian court that had ended Grimoald's usurpation of the Austrasian throne." The Vita states that "out of hatred of her father that kings, queens, and even priests... wished to drag her from her place" and steal Wulfetrud's property. Wulfetrud was only 20 years old at the time.

Wilfetrud's appointment was a testament to Gertrude's power and influence within the abbey and the Catholic Church itself. According to the Vita, Wulfetrud kept her position "through the grace of God." At the same time, however, Gertrude was unable to help "Grimoald or his daughter against Clovis II."

=== Death ===
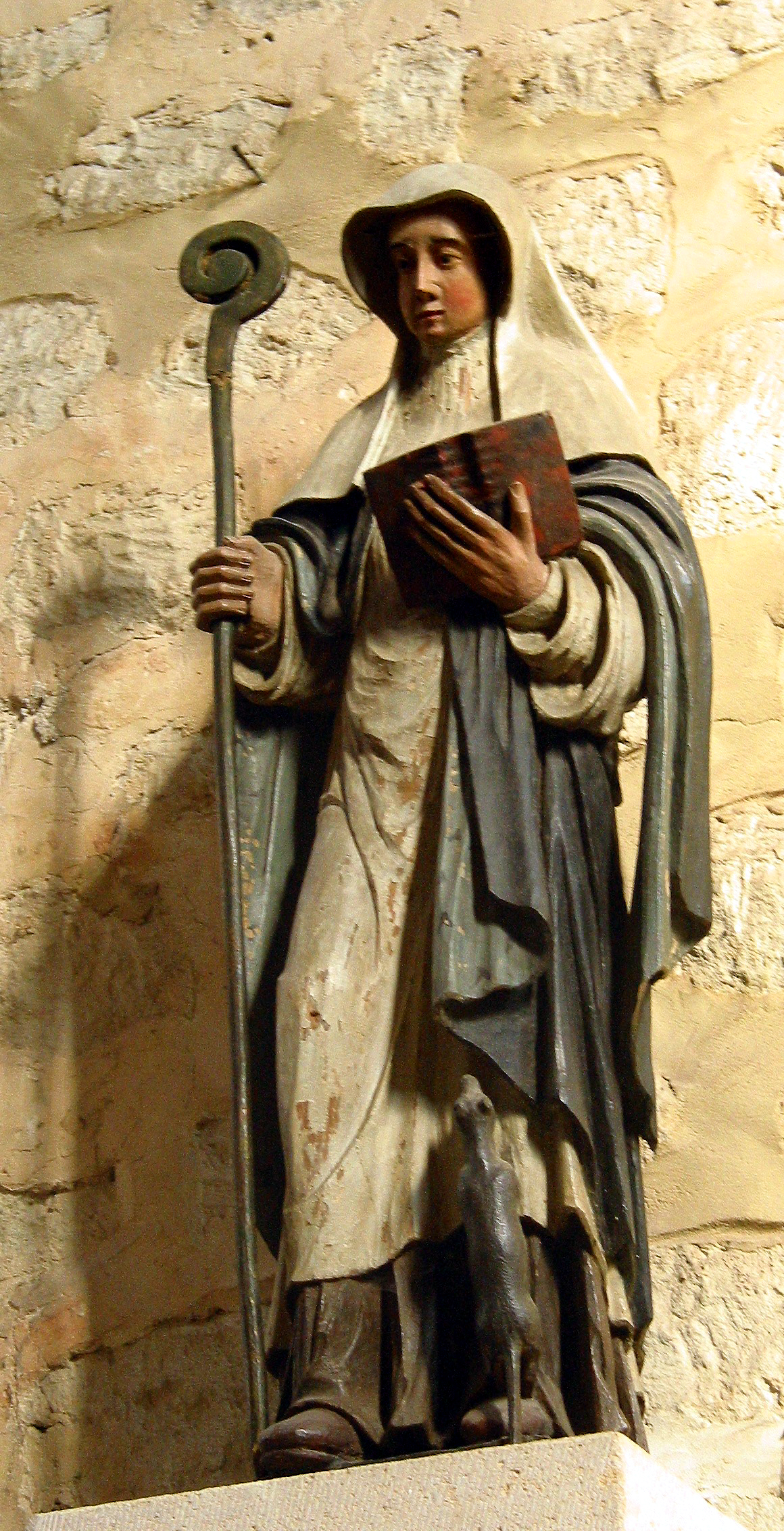
Nivelles (Belgium), the Saint Gertrude of Nivelles statue

Gertrude is portrayed as leading a devout life until her death. It is possible that, after taking the veil in circa 640, she never left the monastery cloister, thus escaping politics and local affairs. Gertrude is described as "exhausted by a life of charity, fasting and prayer" at the end of her short life. The Cambridge Medieval History says that "because of too much abstinence and keeping of vigils... her body was sorrily exhausted with serious illness."

Gertrude's Vita describes her, after relinquishing her role as abbess, spending her time praying intensely and secretly wearing a hair shirt. According to her biographer, Gertrude felt the time of her death approaching and asked a pilgrim from the Fosses monastery when she would die. This pilgrim is commonly believed to be Ultan, Foillan's brother. Fouracre and Gerberding dispute that Ultan was Abbot of Fosses, but there is some speculation. Ultan prophesied that Gertrude would die on 17 March, the very next day, and also the feast day of Saint Patrick. Furthermore, Ultan prophesied that "she may pass joyously because blessed Bishop Patrick with the chosen angels of God... are prepared to receive her." True to the prophecy, Gertrude died the next day after praying all night and taking communion. Shortly after her death, the monk Rinchinus as well as the author of the Vita noticed a pleasant odor in cell with her body.

Just before her death in 659, Gertrude instructed the nuns at Nivelles to bury her in an old veil left behind by a traveling pilgrim and Gertrude's own hair shirt. She died in poverty, 17 March 659, at the age of thirty-three years.

Gertrude's choice of burial clothing is a pattern in medieval hagiography as an expression of humility and piety. Her death and the image of her weak and humble figure is, in fact, a critical point in her biographer's narrative. Her monastery also benefitted from this portrayal because the haircloth and veil in which Gertrude was interred became relics. Bonnie Effros contends that identification with tombs like Gertrude's signaled higher privilege and prestige within the church. Tombs covered with cloths often functioned as altars for those who had access to them. At Nivelles, her relics were only publicly displayed for feast days, Easter, and other holy days.

== Veneration ==
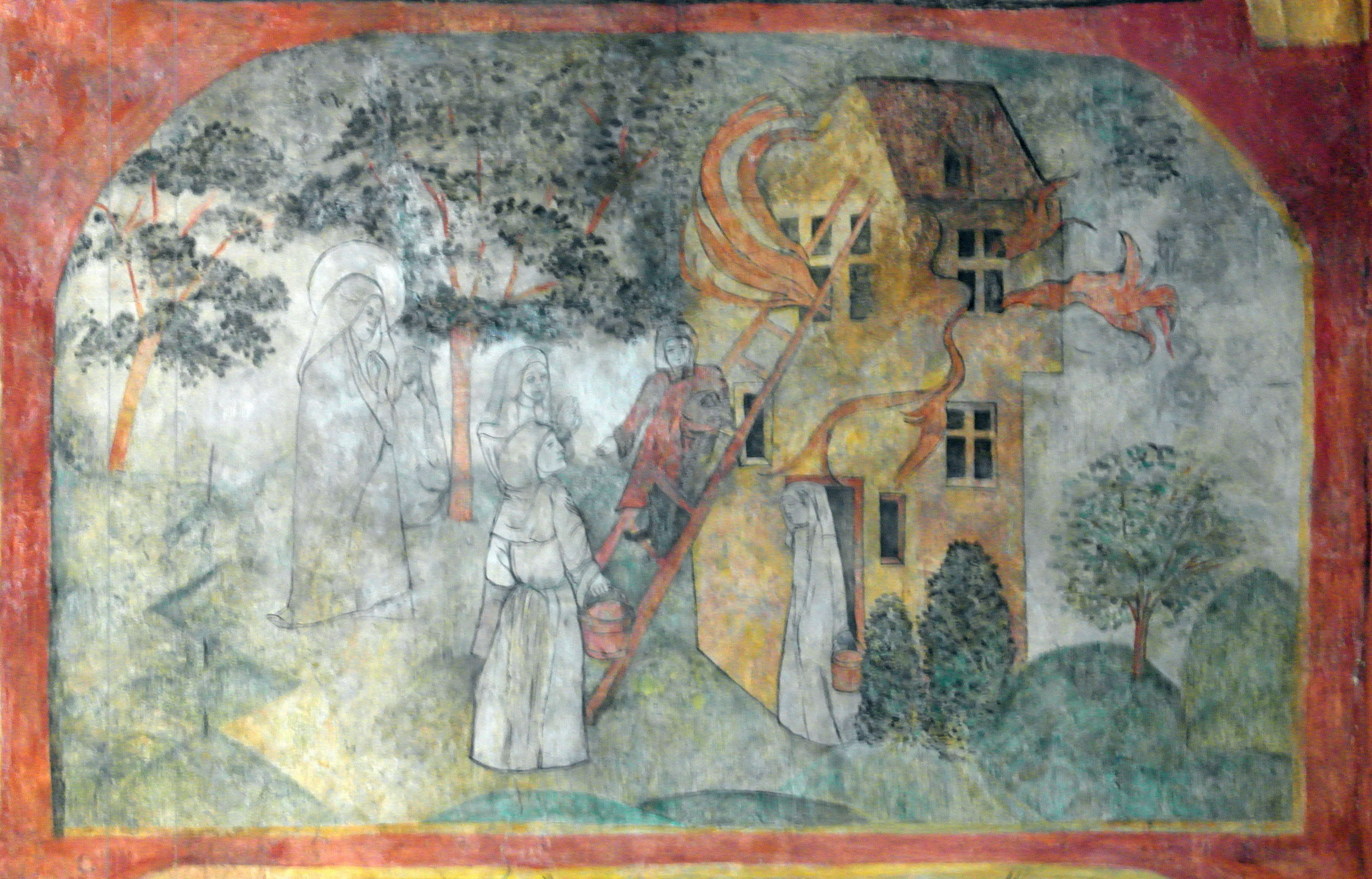
Saint Gertrude saving a house on fire, detail of a mural in the Crosier Monastery, Maastricht

Gertrude is the patron saint of the City of Nivelles. The towns of Geertruidenberg, Breda, and Bergen-op-Zoom in North Brabant, also are under her patronage. Gertrude was also the patron saint of the Order of the Holy Cross (Crosiers or Crutched Friars). In the Crosier Church in Maastricht, the Netherlands, a large mural from the 16th century depicts eight scenes from her life and legend.

The legend of Gertrude's vision of the ocean voyage led her to be as well the patron saint of travelers. In memory of this event, medieval travelers drank a so-called "Sinte Geerts Minne" or "Gertrudenminne" before setting out on their journey. Her attention to the care of her garden led her assistance to be invoked by gardeners, and also against rats and mental illness.

Le Tour Sainte-Gertrude is a traditional procession around Nivelles. The abbesses and the canons used to regularly make a long journey outside the walls of the abbey in emulation of Gertrude, to meet the farmers, the poor and the sick. Many of the pilgrims participate in costume, as they accompany a cart bearing a reliquary containing Gertrude's relics. In May 2004, the Saint Gertrude Tour was proclaimed "Oral and Intangible Heritage Masterpiece of the French Community." The hundred years-old secondary school "Collège Sainte-Gertrude de Nivelles" founded by the Cardinal Désiré-Joseph Mercier in the city owes its name to the saint.

== Gertrude of Nivelles in Literature ==
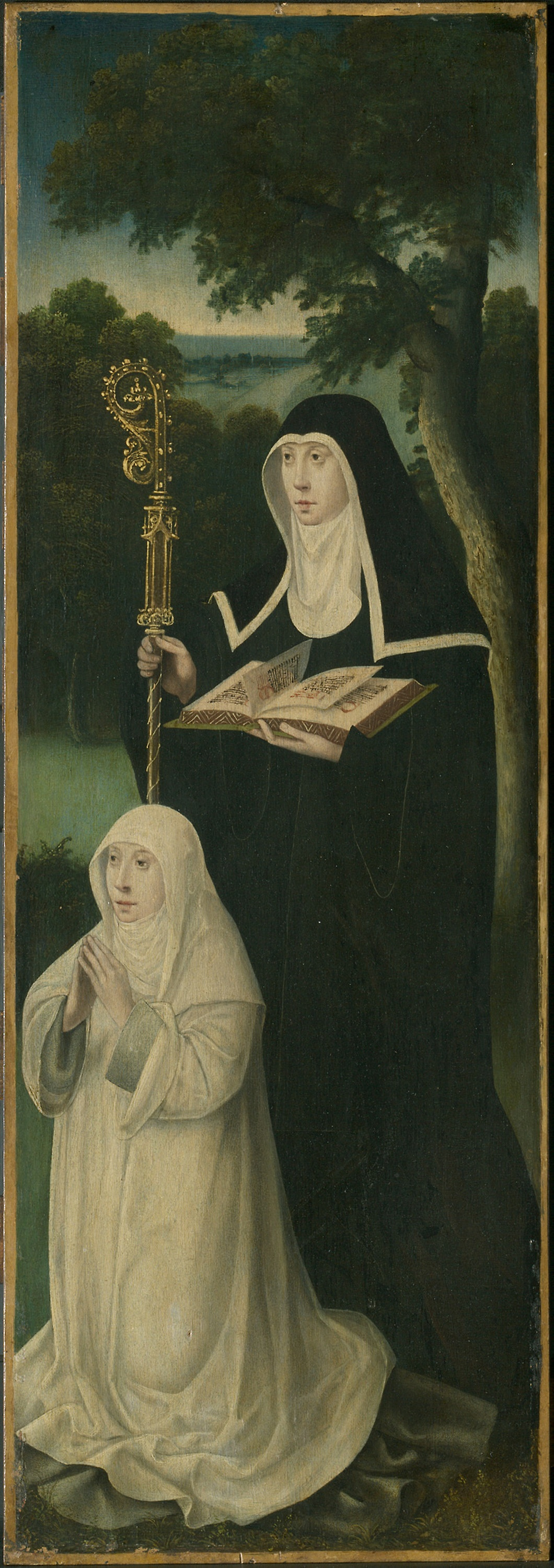
Northern Netherlandish School - Saint Gertrude of Nivelles and an Augustinian Canoness

=== Vita Sanctae Geretrudis and the Additamentum Nivialense de Fuilano ===
The Vita was originally thought to have been written in the eleventh century, but this was later disproven with the discovery of a version dating from the eighth century. Bruno Krush argues that the work is written around the same time that the events it describes take place, and there is wide agreement that it was written before 670, and after 663. The time range is determined using a combination of Latin style, references by contemporary works, the accuracy of the events (indicating a close proximity to their occurrence), and references in the text to known events. The Vita is one of just a few sources dating from seventh century France, and one of only three from Austrasia (all of which deal with Gertrude). This makes the Vita very important as a source for Charlemagne's ancestry as well as placing the "Cradle of the Carolingians" in the middle Meuse in Brabant as opposed to Moselle in Luxembourg, where Pepin II and Plectrude had large tracts of land.

The author of Vita writes as a first-hand witness to the events he describes. Although it is perfectly plausible that he could have been a monk or nun, and there some debate on this topic. Based on his reference to himself "with another brother," the author is most likely male.

The Vita was originally written for Abbot Agnes, who succeeded Wulfetrud upon her death.

=== Source integrity ===
As indicated by Charlemagne's inclusion of Arnulf of Metz in his family tree (in a work by Paul the Deacon, a Lombard), there were incentives to being associated with saints in Carolingian times. Fouracre and Gerberding argue that there were large incentives to being associated with saints in the seventh century as well, casting doubt on the genealogy presented in many sources. However, these scholars argue that the close temporal relationship of the three Austrasian sources to the life of Gertrude as well as the monastic audience of the works make them more than likely credible.

According to Catherine Peyroux, who believes that because author is writing very near Gertrude's lifetime, account must at least be "essentially plausible to Gertrude's contemporaries."

== Relationship with Arnulf of Metz ==
Gertrude's relationship with Arnulf of Metz is a persistent source of confusion for scholars and students alike. Numerous sources point to a relationship between Gertrude and Arnulf, while others believe this relationship is invented. In particular, the debate focuses on Arnulf's relationship with Ansegisel, the husband of Begga, Gertrude's sister. Sources that include Arnulf in the Pippinid family state that Arnulf is that father of Ansegisel. Sources making the opposite claim do not.

Ian Wood recommends focusing only on the four earliest sources for this information, as later sources are based on these few documents. He starts with the continuations of the chronicles of Fredegar, which do not mention this connection, and are based on an earlier work. He says that "since Childebrand himself was the half-brother of Charles Martel, it is not surprising that the Fredegar continuator add the information contained in the Liber Historiae Francorum material largely concerned with Austrasia and Frisia" in 751. However, he adds no information regarding Arnulf at this time. The Liber is one of the earliest works detailing the history of this period and makes no mention of the relationship between Arnulf and Ansegisel.

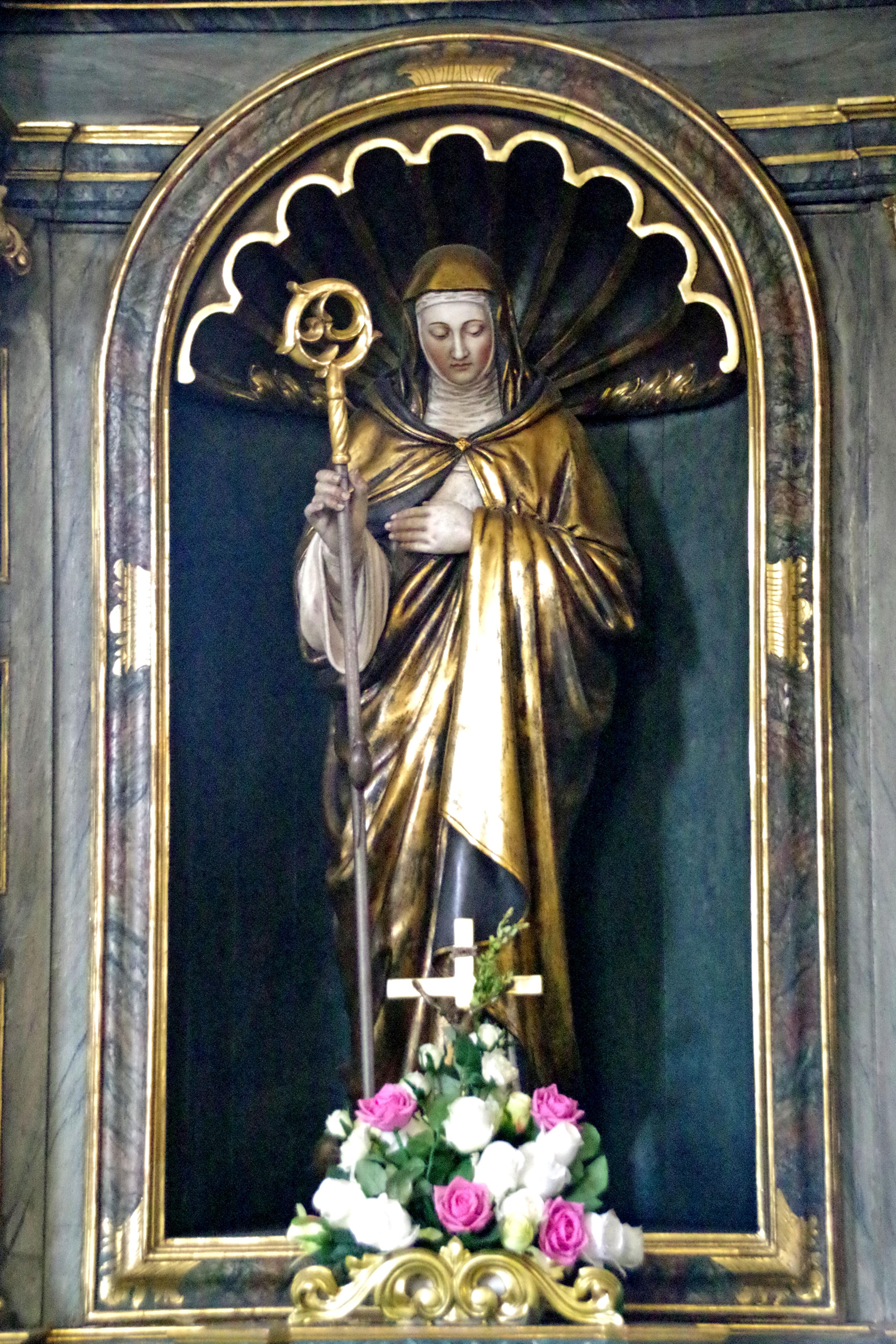
Statue of Saint Gertrude at a side altar

Moving to a later source, Wood shows how the Annales Mettenses Priores radically change the picture (from the Liber, the earliest source for the late seventh century, written in 727). The Annales allude to the power held by previous members of the family, especially by Pippin I. They also allude to Pippin I's relationship to Arnulf, Bishop of Metz, although they do not specify the nature of that relationship. In addition they talk with great admiration of Pepin II's grandmother, Itta, and his Aunt, Gertrude. From the start, therefore, the Annales Mettenses Priores announce their intention of turning the history of the seventh and eighth centuries into a history of the Pippinids, or the Carolingians they were to become." As a result of this shift, Wood argues that "For the period up until 714, therefore, Annales Mettenses Priores produce a substantially different account of events from that offered by the Liber Historiae Francorum, making Pepin the center of attention, and conferring on him complete power from the Battle of Tertry onwards."

This change in focus, while not invalid per se, certainly is problematic, because the Annales were written long after the time period they describe. This is especially important, notes Wood, because "as a reading of history the so-called Metz Prior Annals have been extremely influential, providing the most popular interpretation of the late Merovingian period. Nevertheless, they show the Pippinids and Merovingian history as the Carolingians wished to see them." Despite this different focus, even the Metz Annales do not state that Arnulf is Ansegisel's father, saying only that he is a great ally of Pippin.

Wood believes that the shift in focus of the Metz Prior Annals is deliberate, citing the need to glorify the sanctity of the newly powerful Pippinids. "The other asset which the family was to develop, its sanctity, was beginning to be realized only in the last decades of the seventh century. Although Arnulf of Metz is thought to have been Pepin II's grandfather, the evidence for this is not early, and even the Annales Mettenses Priores were uncertain about the nature of the relationship between Arnulf and the Pippinids." According to Wood, this link comes first from Paul the Deacon (Gesta episcoporum Mettensium) and is suspect, as Paul was not familiar with the events he was writing about and had limited access to reference materials.

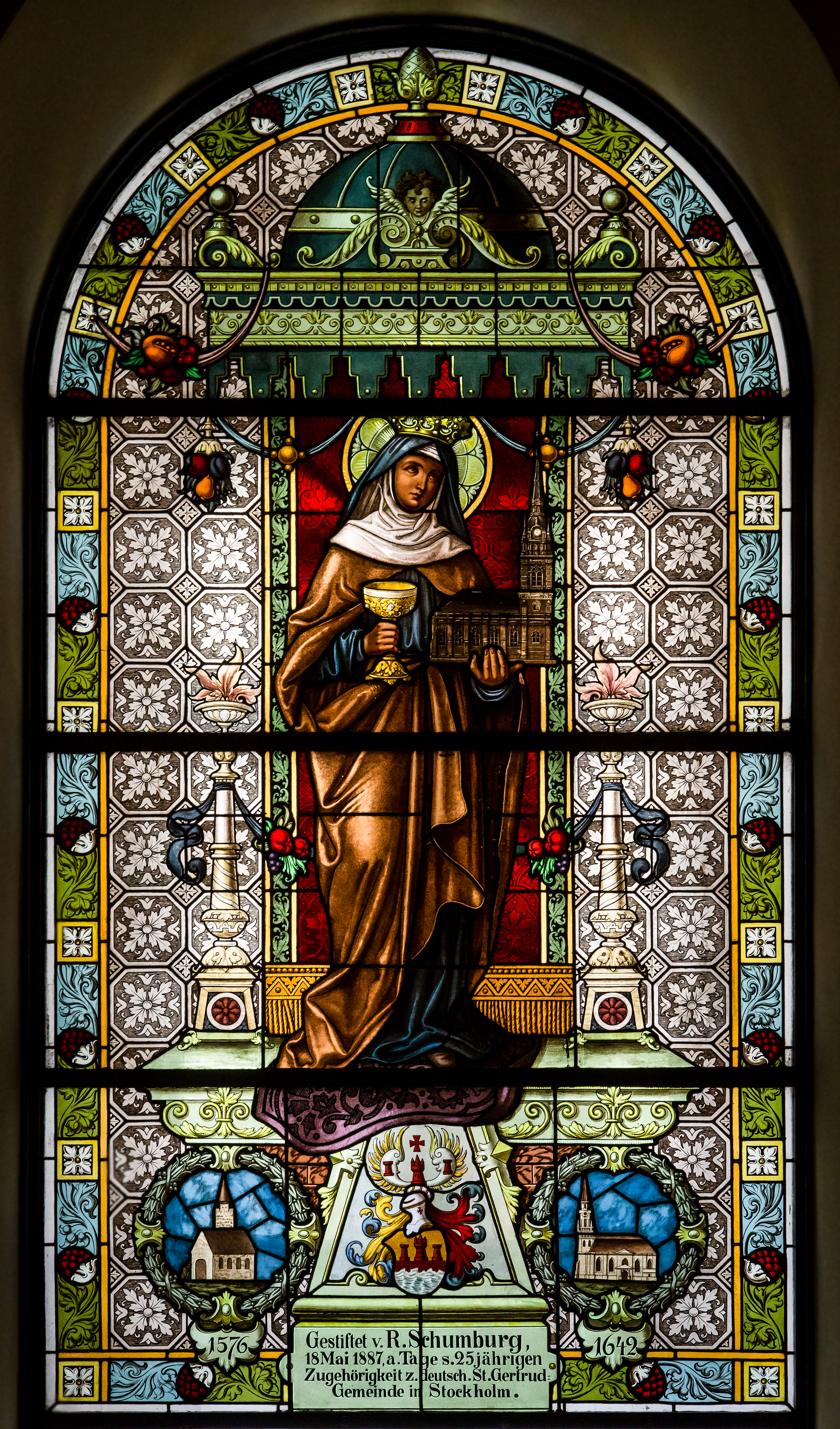
Saint Gertrude in the German Church, Stockholm

Of the other early sources that might establish a link between Ansegisel and Arnulf, all that is left is the Vita Arnulfi, or "Life of Arnulf." However, according to Wood, it is "not clear that the Vita Arnulfi... was written in the seventh century." It is possible that this work was a forgery, created later to sanctify the Carolingian line. This argument is not without base, because after Gertrude died in 659, "her sanctity was unquestionably promoted by the family in the late seventh century" beginning with her 'Vita in 670.

== Recent popular culture ==
The assignment of Gertrude as patron of cats and the designation of the cat as one of her attributes seems to date from the 1980s. It is not mentioned at all in Madou's extensive historical survey from 1975. A more superficial association of Gertrude with the cat as a mouse hunter goes further back. Her veneration as protector against rats and mice dates from the early 15th century during the Black Death and spread from southwestern Germany to the Netherlands and Catalonia. Some 20th-century folklore studies research conflated her with the Germanic goddess Frigg, who may have been depicted riding a cat. The authoritative Handwörterbuch des deutschen Aberglaubens (published in multiple volumes, 1927–1942) does not verify the connection to cats. The first major English-language publication presenting her as patron of cats is a 1981 catalogue of the Metropolitan Museum of Art.

== Family ==
Pepin of Landen (c. 580–640) | Itta of Metz (592–652) | Saint Modoald (c. 585 – 645 or 648)
Grimoald the Elder (616–657) | Gertrude of Nivelles (c. 628–659) | Begga (613–693)
Pepin of Herstal (635–714)
Charles Martel (c. 690–741)
Pepin the Short (714–768)
Charlemagne (747–814)

Severa (c. 600 – c. 640)

Unknown
Modesta († c. 660)

== Bibliography ==
- Collet, Emmanuel. "Sainte Gertrude de Nivelles: Culte, Histoire, Tradition." Nivelles: Comité de Sainte Gertrude, 1985.
- Delanne, Blanche. Histoire de la Ville de Nivelles: Des Origines au XIIIe siècle. Nivelles: Impr. Havaux, 1944.
- Donnay-Rocmans, Claudine (1979). La Collégiale Sainte-Gertrude de Nivelles (in French). Gembloux: Duculot. ISBN 978-2-8011-0262-6.
- Effros, Bonnie. Caring for Body and Soul: Burial and the Afterlife in the Merovingian World. Pennsylvania: Pennsylvania State University Press, 1965.
- MacNeill, Eoin. "Beginnings of Latin Culture in Ireland". Studies: An Irish Quarterly Review of Letters, Philosophy and Science, 20 (1931)
- McNamara, Jo Ann and John E. Halbord with E. Gordon Whatley. Sainted Women of the Dark Ages. Durham, N.C.: Duke University Press, 1992.
- Madou, Mireille, De heilige Gertrudis van Nijvel. Brussels, 1975 (the most extensive study on her veneration).
- Madou, M.J.H., "S. Gertrude de Nivelles". In: Dictionnaire d'histoire et de géographie ecclésiastiques, 20 (1984), 1065–1068
- Peyroux, Catherine (1998). "Gertrude's Furor: Reading Anger in an Early Medieval Saint's Life". In Rosenwein, Barbara H. (ed.). Anger's Past: The Social Uses of an Emotion in the Middle Ages. Ithaca, N.Y.: Cornell University Press. pp. 36–55. ISBN 978-0-8014-3266-8.
- Unknown. The Fourth Book of the Chronicle of Fredegar. Trans. J.M. Walace-Hadrill. London: Nelson, 1960.
- The New Cambridge Medieval History. Vol. 1. Ed. Paul Fouracre. Cambridge: Cambridge University Press, 2008.
- Wemple, Suzanne Fonay. Women in Frankish Society: Marriage and the Cloister, 500–900. Philadelphia: University of Pennsylvania Press, 1981.
- Wood, Ian N. (1994). The Merovingian Kingdoms, 450-751. London: Longman. ISBN 978-0-582-21878-9.
- https://www.catholic.org/saints/saint.php?saint_id=3563
