= Itta of Metz =

Roman Catholic saint

Saint Itta of Nivelles OSB
- Born: 592; Metz, Kingdom of Austrasia
- Died: 8 May 652; Abbey of Nivelles, Kingdom of Austrasia
- Venerated in: Orthodox and Roman Catholic Church
- Major shrine: Collegiate Church of Saint Gertrude, Nivelles, Walloon Brabant, Belgium
- Feast: 8 May
- Patronage: Itteville, Île-de-France, France

Itta of Metz, OSB (also Ida, Itte or Iduberga; 592–8 May 652) was the wife of Blessed Pepin of Landen, Mayor of the Palace of the Kingdom of Austrasia. After his death, Itta founded the Abbey of Nivelles as a double monastery for both monks and nuns, where she became a Benedictine along with her daughter, Saint Gertrude of Nivelles. Both are honored as saints by the Orthodox and Roman Catholic Church.

== Life ==
There is no direct record of Itta's parents, but it has been suggested that she came from a family of senatorial status which had originated in Aquitaine, and was a daughter of Arnoald, Bishop of Metz, son of Ansbertus. Her brother was Saint Modoald, Bishop of Trier, and her sister Severa was an abbess.

Itta married Pepin of Landen, Mayor of the Merovingian Royal Palace. After Pepin died in 640, Itta and her daughter Gertrude withdrew from the capital for a religious life. Later, around 647, on the advice of Amandus, the Bishop of Maastricht, Itta founded the Abbey of Nivelles. The abbey was originally a community of nuns, but it became a double monastery when the nuns were joined by a group of Irish monks who provided support for the abbey's operations. She might have appointed her daughter Gertrude as its first abbess, while Itta lived under her reign, assisting the young abbess by her advice. Itta died at the abbey on 8 May 652.

== Children ==
Itta had another daughter by Pepin, Abbess Begga of Andenne, who had married Ansegisel, son of Arnulf of Metz, before joining the monastery. By Saint Begga, she is the grandmother of Pepin of Herstal and one of the matriarchs of the great Carolingian family.

Her sons were Grimoald, later Mayor of the Palace, and father of King Childebert the Adopted; Itta's second son Saint Bavo (or Allowin) became a hermit and was later canonized. Both her daughters were also canonized, as was she. Her feast day is celebrated on 8 May.

== Patronage ==
Itta is honoured as the patron saint of the French village of Itteville, which was founded on the site of a farm that she had established.

== Family ==
Blessed Pepin of Landen (c. 580–640)	Saint Itta of Metz (592–652)	Saint Modoald (c. 585 – 645 or 648)	Severa (c. 600 – c. 640)
Grimoald the Elder (616–657)	Saint Gertrude of Nivelles (c. 628–659)	Saint Begga (613–693)	Saint Bavo of Ghent (622–659)
Pepin of Herstal (635–714)
Charles Martel (c. 690–741)
Pepin the Short (714–768)
Charlemagne (747–814)

Unknown
Saint Modesta († c. 660)

== Sources ==
- Alban Butler's Lives of the Saints, edited, revised, and supplemented by Thurston and Attwater. Christian Classics, Westminster, Maryland.
