= Remaclus =

Saint Remaclus of Stablo
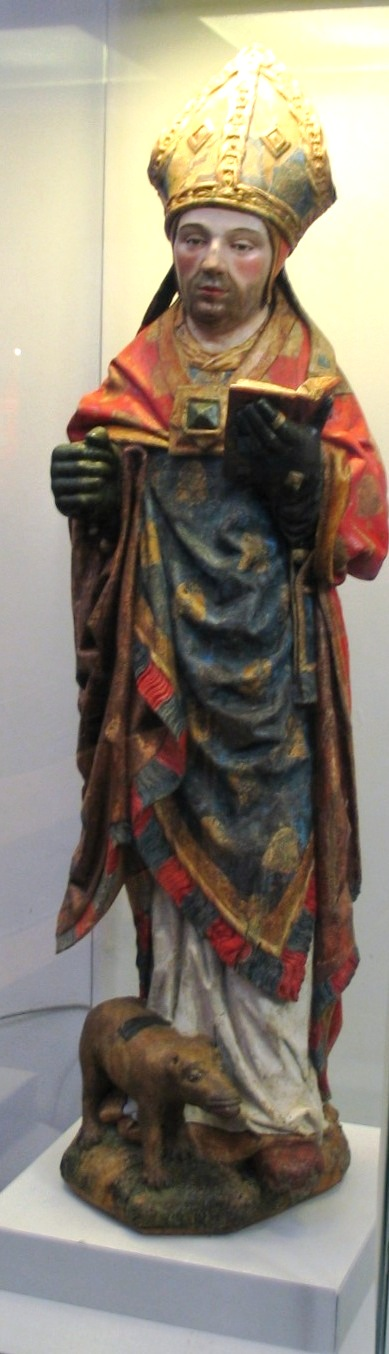
- Statue of Saint Remaclus in the Sint-Sebastiaanskerk in Stavelot
- Born: late 6th or early 7th century Duchy of Aquitaine
- Died: between 671 and 676; Stavelot, Imperial Abbey of Stavelot-Malmedy (now Belgium)
- Venerated in: Eastern Orthodox Church; Roman Catholic Church
- Major shrine: Stavelot Abbey
- Feast: 3 September
- Attributes: accompanied by a wolf

Remaclus (also called Remaclus von Stablo; died 673) was a Benedictine missionary bishop who is venerated as a saint.

== Life ==
Remaclus grew up at the Aquitanian ducal court and studied under Sulpitius the Pious, bishop of Bourges. In 625 he became a Benedictine monk at Luxeuil Abbey and was later ordained a priest. Around 631 Eligius founded Solignac Abbey and sent for monks from Luxeil, among them Remaclus, who became the first abbot. The abbey followed the rule as at Luxeil. Audoin wrote that Solignac quickly gained importance. It became particularly known for its silversmith's workshop.

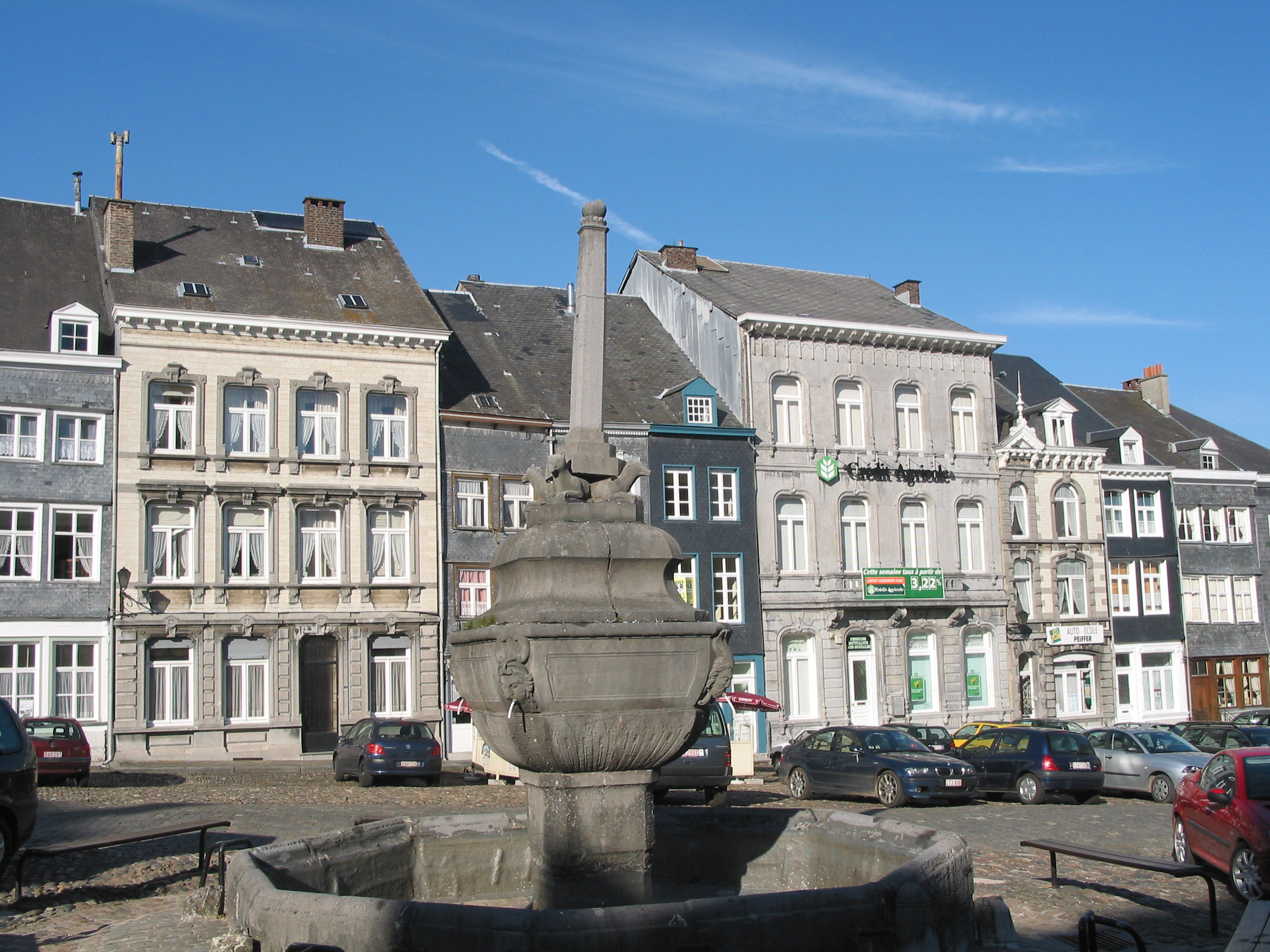
St. Remacle Square, in Stavelot

Remaclus was then given charge as well of the abbey of Cougnon, in the duchy of Luxemburg. He served as an advisor to Sigebert III of Austrasia and persuaded him to establish the double-monastery of Malmedy in 648 and Stavelot in 650. Remaclus served as abbot of the Princely Abbey of Stavelot-Malmedy.

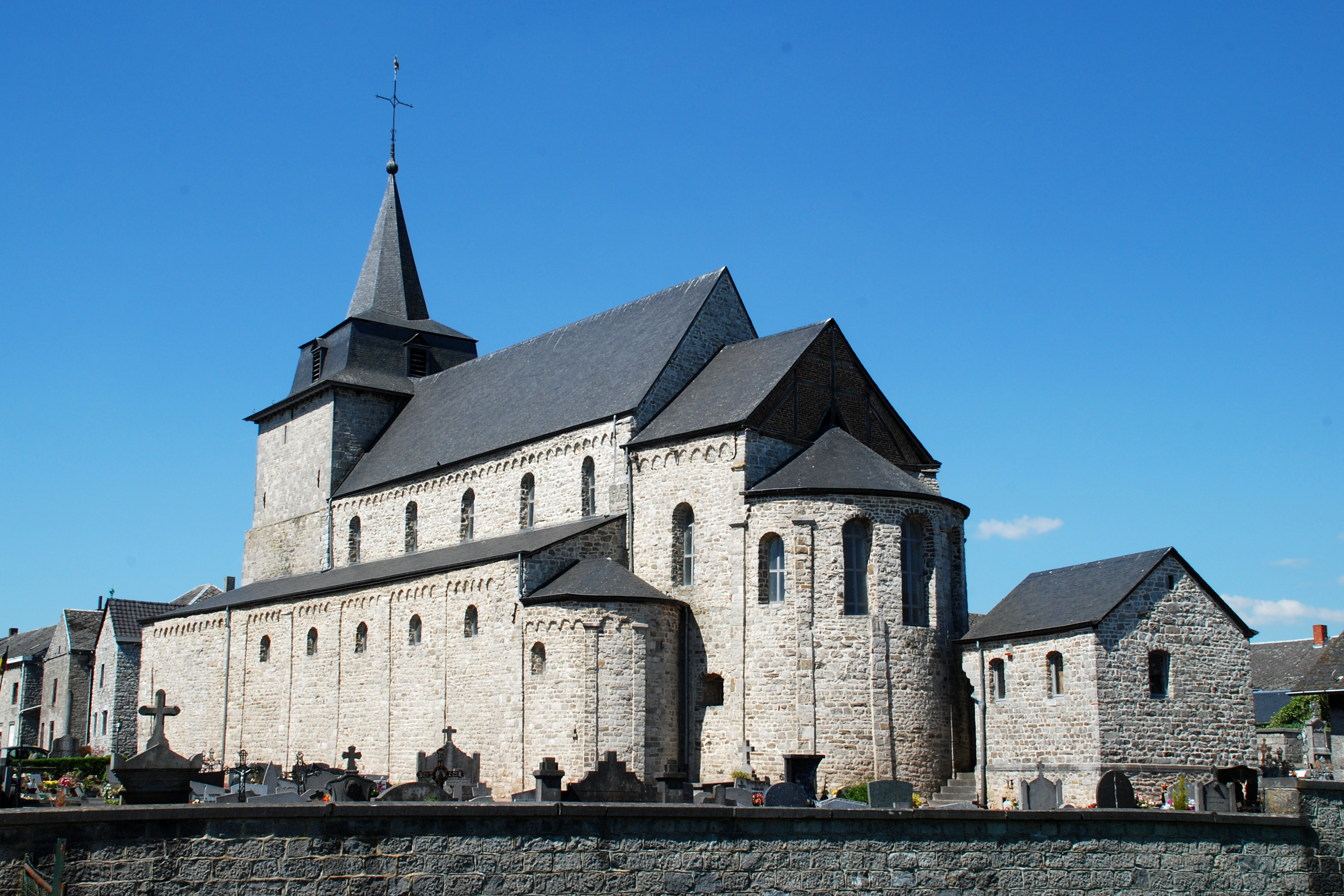
Church of Saint Remaclus in Ocquier, Belgium

In 650 Amandus, the Bishop of Maastricht, resigned his see to resume missionary work. Remaclus was appointed instead of him. He brought with him Hadelin, the abbot of Visé. His student Theodard succeeded him as abbot of the double monastery of Stavelot-Malmedy.

Inhabitants of this troubled diocese had murdered some of his predecessors. However, Remaclus successfully spread monasticism in the region. He served as the spiritual teacher to Ss. Trudo, Babolen, Theodard, and Lambert. Remaclus served as bishop for twelve years before resigning in favor of Theodard, and retiring to Stavelot around 662. He died at Stavelot in 664. His relics lie in St. Sebastian Church in Stavelot. His feast day is September 3. It is commonly held that if it rains on this day, it is a good sign, because then as much grain sprouts from the earth as raindrops fall on the field.

Popular legends speak of him being accompanied by a wolf, able to drive away the devil who wanted to destroy the newly built churches. With his staff, the saint is said to have discovered springs that were considered healing waters.

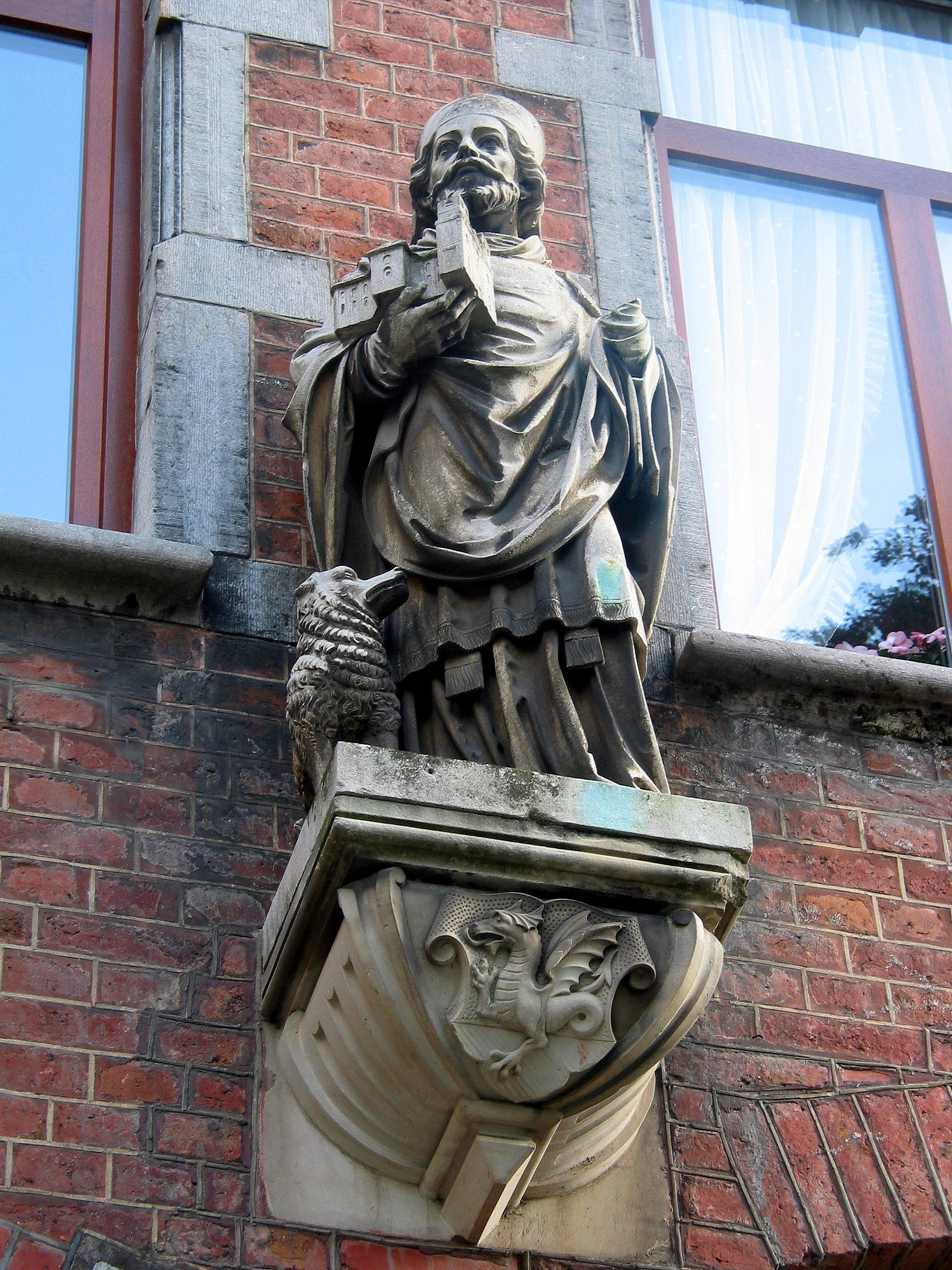
Saint Remacle - Malmedy

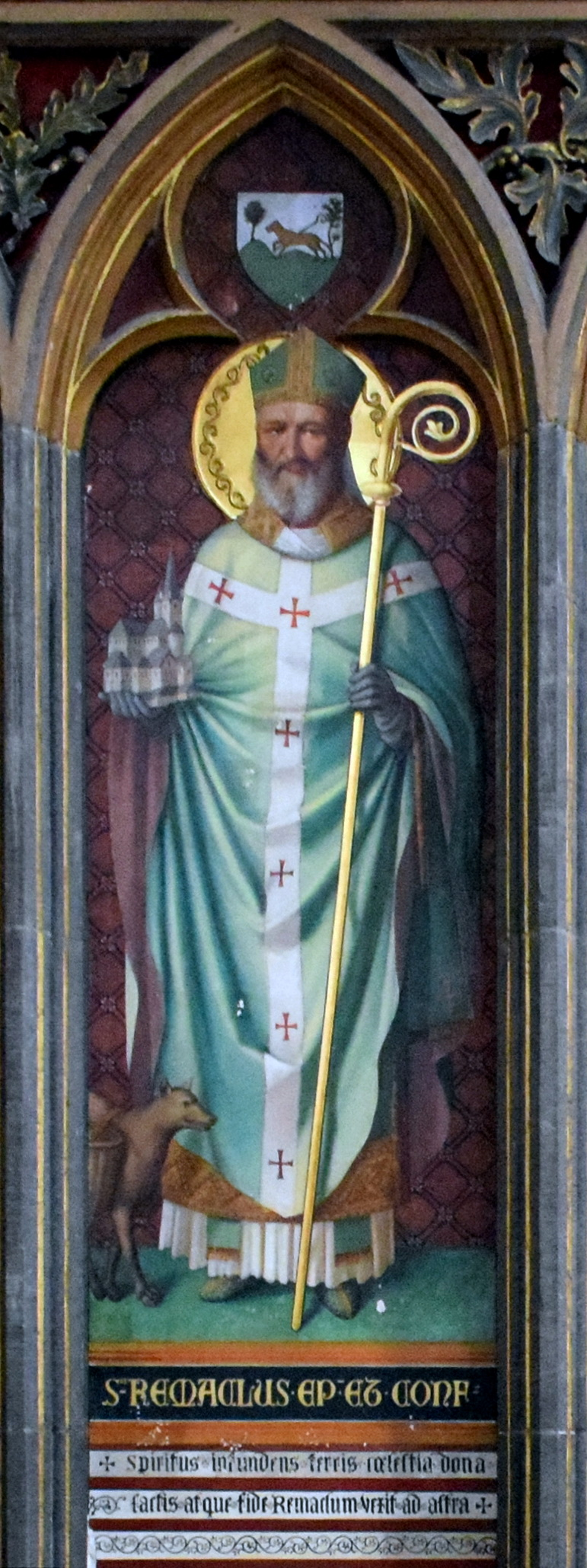
St Remacle, Liège Cathédrale

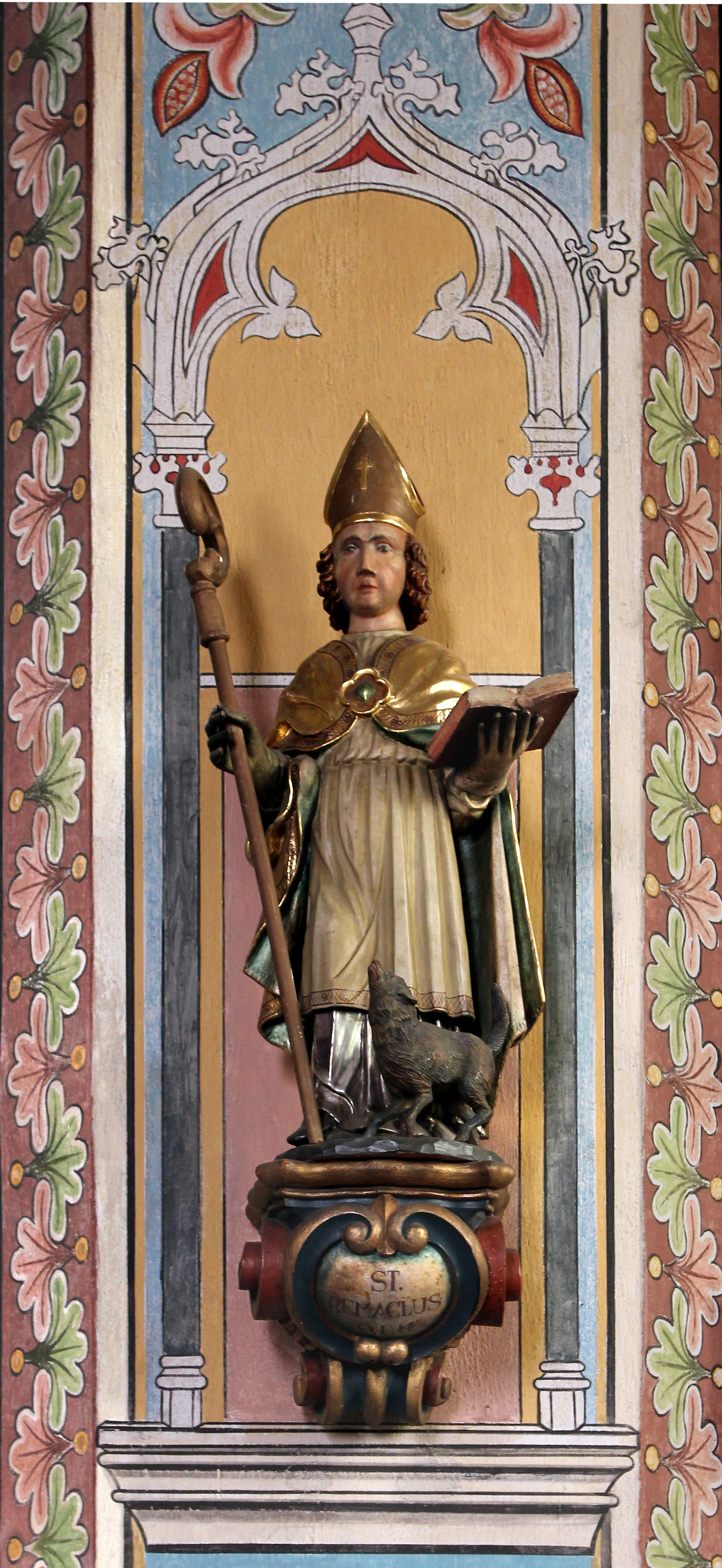
St. Remaclus, Waldorf

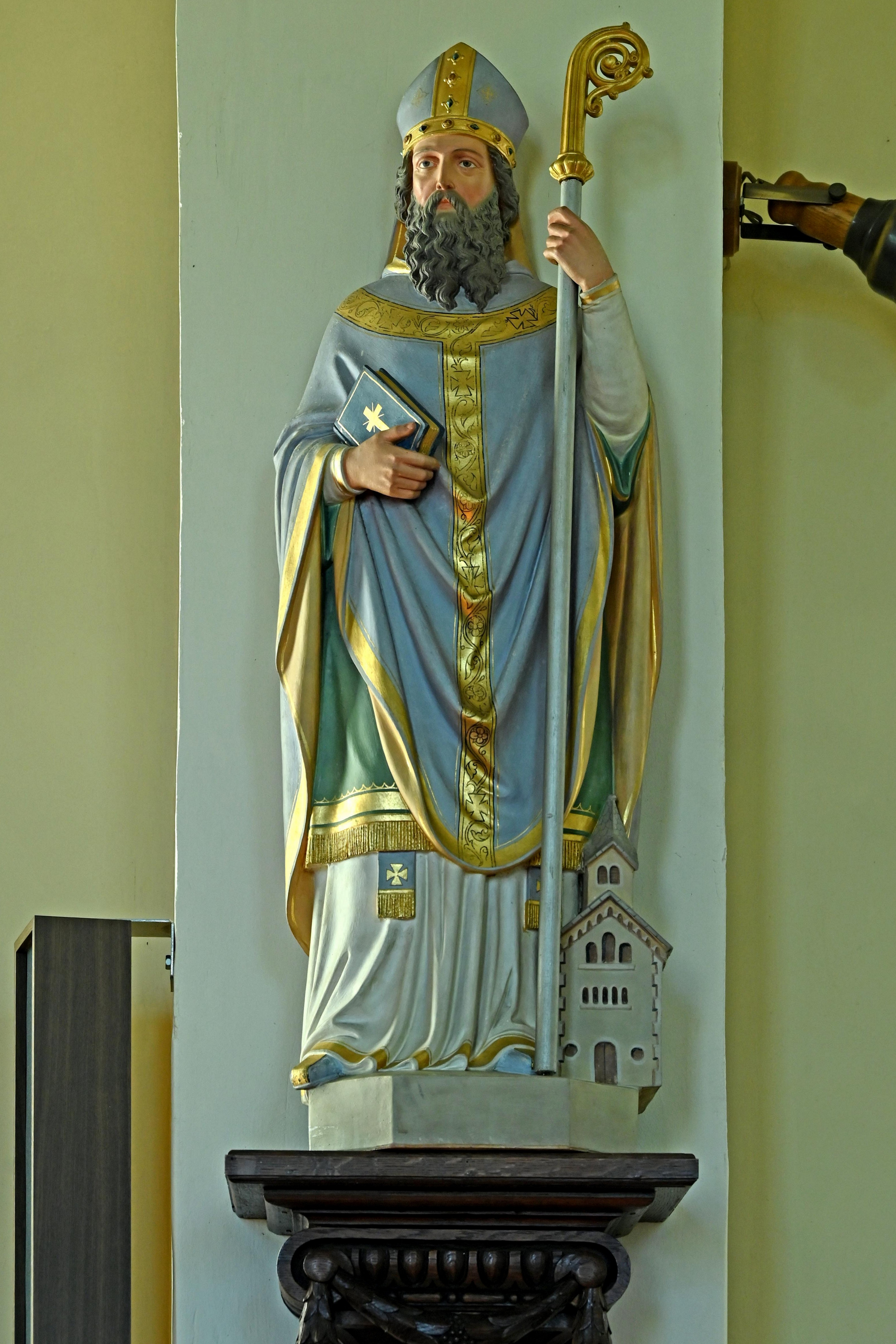
St. Hilarius, Maspelt

There are a number of churches dedicated to his patronage, located mainly in the Eifel and Moselle regions of Germany, as well as in the Belgian, Luxembourg and French Ardennes. There is a St. Remaclus Parish Church in Cochem, Germany. The abbeys of Stavelot-Malmedy ceased to exist at the time of the French Revolution. In 1950 St. Remaclus' Priory, Wavreumont was established between Stavelot and Malmedy.
