= Clavier, Liège =

Municipality in Liège Province, Wallonia, Belgium

Clavier Clavir (Walloon)
- Municipality
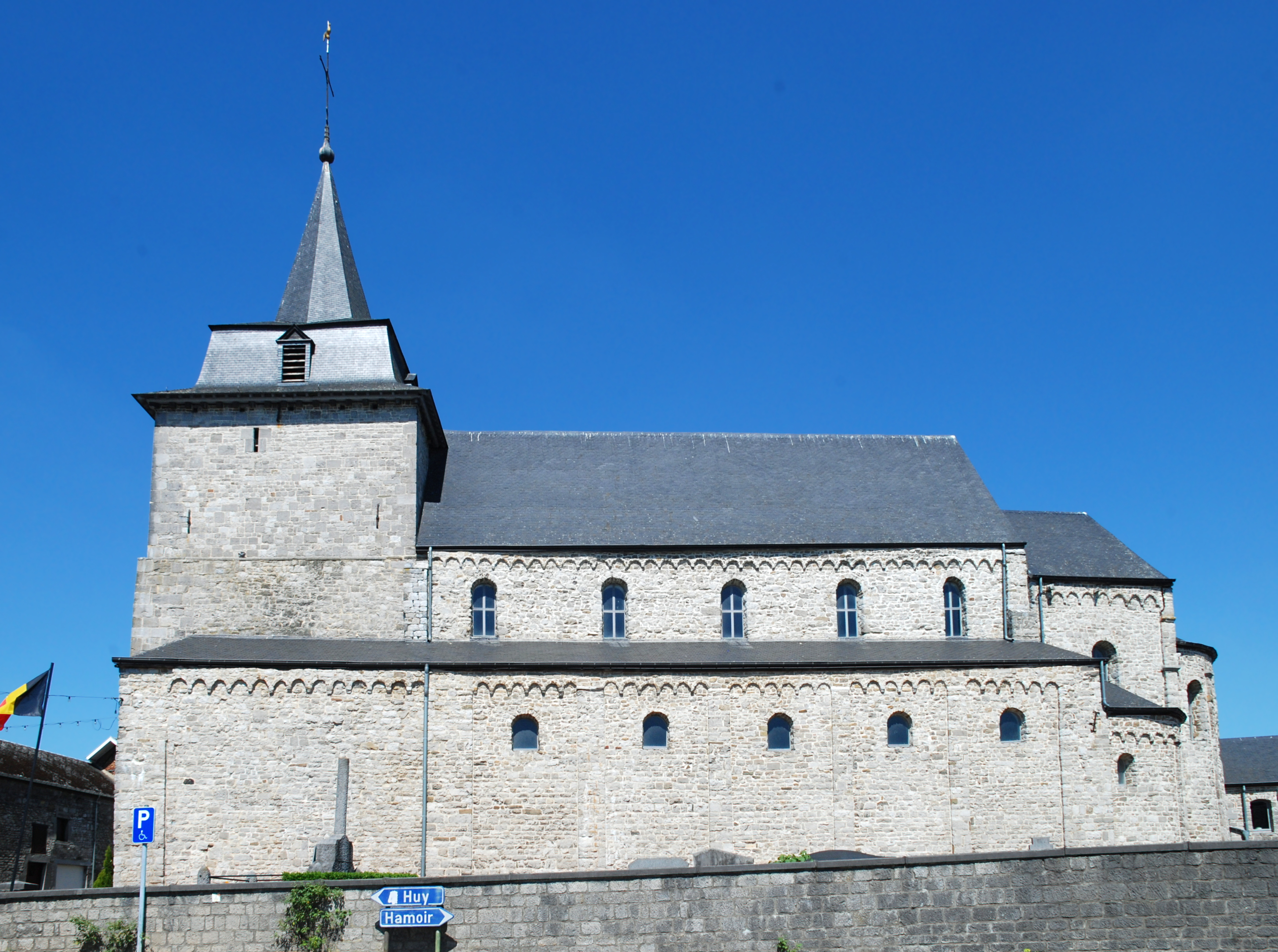
- The Church of Saint Remaclus in Ocquier, Clavier

- Flag Coat of arms

- Location of Clavier in the province of Liège
- Interactive map of Clavier
- Location in Belgium
- Coordinates: 50°25′N 05°22′E
- Country: Belgium
- Community: French Community
- Region: Wallonia
- Province: Liège
- Arrondissement: Huy

Government
  - Mayor: Philippe Dubois (MR)
  - Governing party: IC

Area
  - Total: 79.5 km^{2} (30.7 sq mi)

Population (2018-01-01)
  - Total: 4,617
  - Density: 58.1/km^{2} (150/sq mi)
- Postal codes: 4560
- NIS code: 61012
- Area codes: 086, 085, 083

Clavier (French pronunciation: [klavje]; Walloon: Clavir) is a municipality of Wallonia located in the province of Liège, Belgium.

On January 1, 2006, Clavier had a total population of 4,172. The total area is 79.12 km^{2} which gives a population density of approximately 53 inhabitants per km^{2}.

The municipality consists of the following districts: Bois-et-Borsu, Clavier, Les Avins, Ocquier, Pailhe, and Terwagne.

The Castel du Val d'Or is an inn with 15 rooms located within Clavier. It dates back to 1654.

== See also ==
- List of protected heritage sites in Clavier, Liège
