= Lambert of Maastricht =

Bishop and Martyr

Saint Lambert of Maastricht
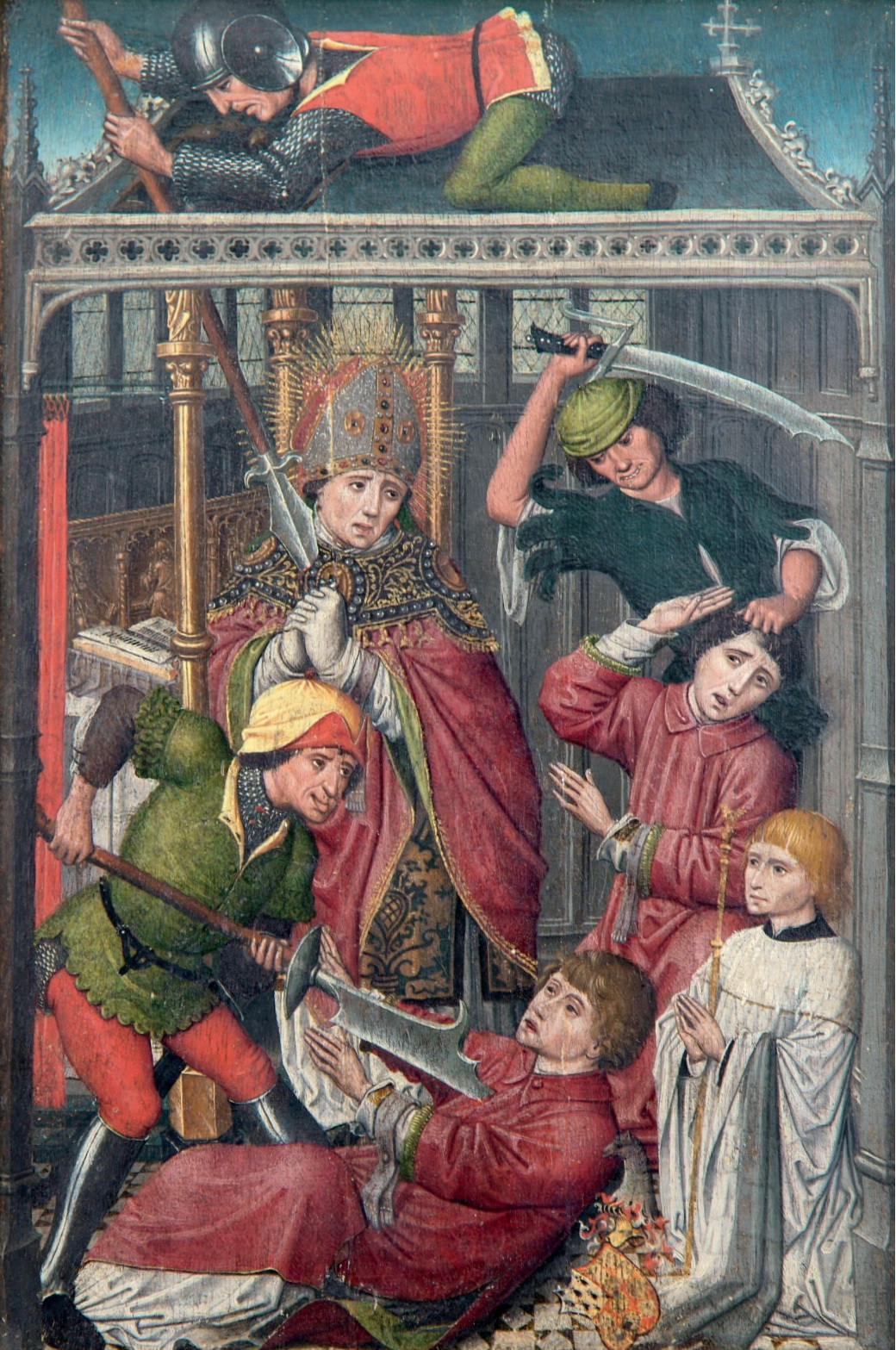
- The murder of Saint Lambert (Jan van Brussel?, c. 1490), detail of the 'Palude diptych' in the Musée Grand Curtius in Liège

Bishop and Martyr
- Born: c. 636; Maastricht
- Died: c. 705; Liège
- Venerated in: Catholic Church, Eastern Orthodox Church, Anglican Communion
- Major shrine: Liège.
- Feast: 17 September
- Attributes: Martyr's palm

Lambert of Maastricht, commonly referred to as Saint Lambert (Latin: Lambertus; Middle Dutch: Sint-Lambrecht; Limburgish: Lambaer, Baer, Bert(us); c. 636 – c. 705), was the bishop of Maastricht-Liège (Tongeren) from about 670 until his death. Lambert denounced Pepin's liaison with his mistress or bigamous wife Alpaida, the mother of Charles Martel. The bishop was murdered during the political turmoil that developed when various families fought for influence as the Merovingian dynasty gave way to the Carolingians. His feast day is September 17.

== Life ==
Very little is known about the life of Lambert. According to the 14th-century chronicle-writer Jean d'Outremeuse he was the son of Apre, lord of Loon, and his wife Herisplindis, both from noble families of Maastricht. The child was baptized by his godfather, the local bishop Remaclus, and educated by Landoald, archpriest of the city and head of the noble abbey school in Wintershoven. Lambert was related to the seneschal Hugobert, the father of Plectrude, who was Pepin of Herstal's lawful wife. He was thus an in-law of hereditary mayors of the palace who controlled the Merovingian kings of Austrasia.

Lambert appears to have frequented the Merovingian court of King Childeric II, and was a protégé of his uncle, Theodard, who succeeded Remaclus as bishop of Maastricht. He is described by early biographers as “a prudent young man of pleasing looks, courteous and well-behaved in his speech and manners, well-built, strong, a good fighter, clear-headed, affectionate, pure and humble, and fond of reading.” When Theodard was murdered soon after 669, the councillors of Childeric made Lambert bishop of Maastricht.

After Childeric himself was murdered in 675, the faction of Ebroin, majordomo of Neustria and the power behind that throne, expelled him from his see, in favor of their candidate, Faramundus. Lambert spent seven years in exile at the recently founded Abbey of Stavelot (674–681). With a change in the turbulent political fortunes of the time, Pepin of Herstal became mayor of the palace and Lambert was allowed to return to his see.

In company with Willibrord, who had come from England in 691, Lambert preached the gospel in the lower stretches of the Meuse, in the area to the north. In conjunction with Landrada he founded a convent at Munsterblizen. Lambert was also the spiritual director of the young noble Hubertus, eldest son of Bertrand, Duke of Aquitaine. Hubertus would later succeed Lambert as bishop of Maastricht.

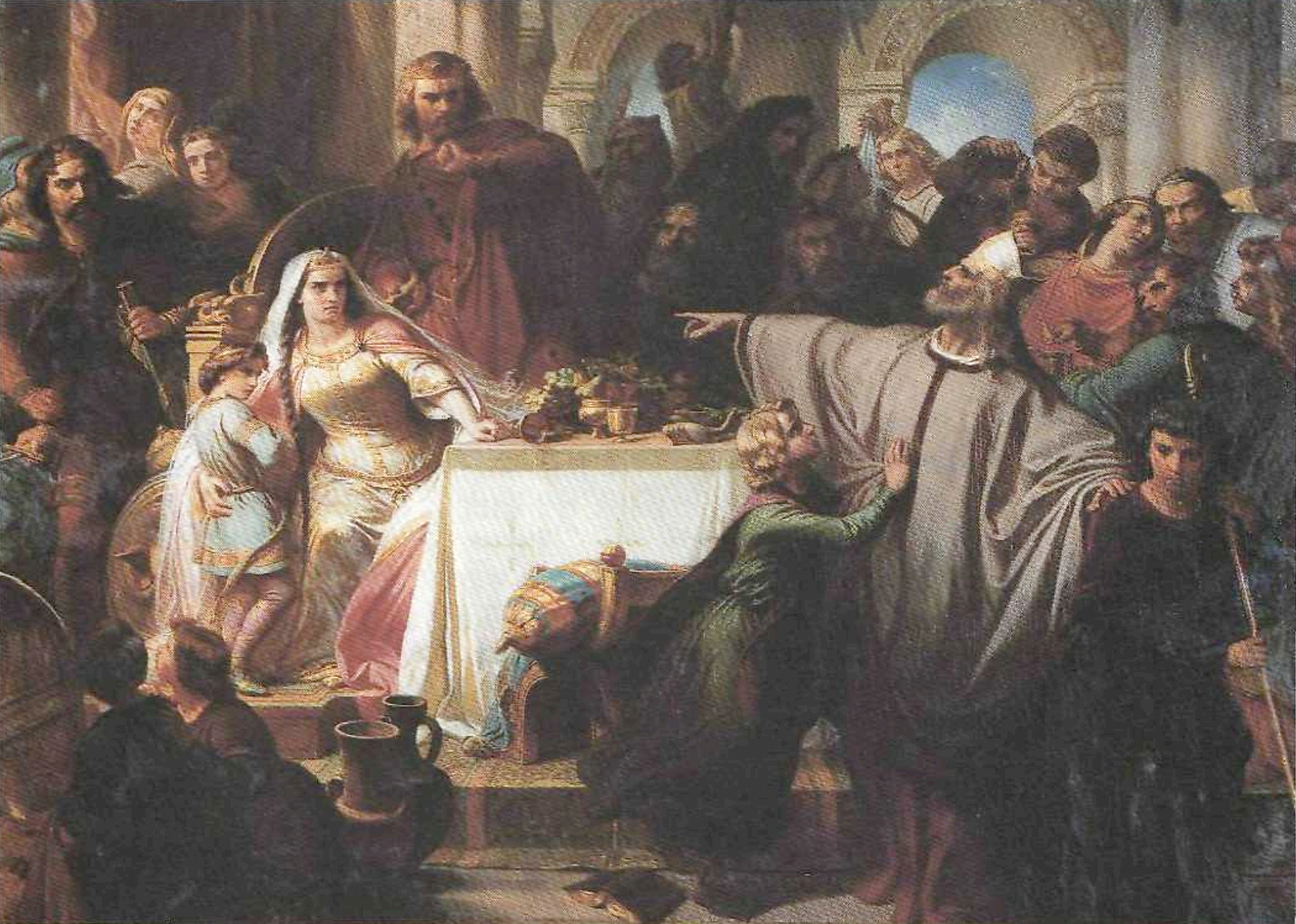
Banquet of Jupille (1861) by Auguste Chauvin depicting Lambert addressing Pepin of Herstal and Alpaida.

Lambert seems to have succumbed to the political turmoil that developed when various clans fought for influence as the Merovingian dynasty gave way to the Carolingians. Historian Jean-Louis Kupper says that the bishop was the victim of a private struggle between two clans seeking to control the Tongres-Maastricht see. Lambert is said to have denounced Pepin's adulterous liaison with Alpaida, who was to become the mother of Charles Martel. This aroused the enmity of either Pepin, Alpaida, or both. The bishop was murdered at Liège by the troops of Dodon, Pepin's domesticus (manager of state domains), father or brother of Alpaida. The year of his death varies between sources, but is taken to be between 705 and 709. Lambert came to be viewed as a martyr for his defence of marital fidelity. Lambert's two nephews, Peter and Audolet, were also killed defending their uncle. They too, were viewed as saints. Many historians however question the accuracy of the relationship between Alpaida and Dodon, due to that claim appearing much later.

Although Lambert was buried at Maastricht, his successor as bishop, Hubertus, translated his relics to Liège, to which the see of Maastricht was eventually moved. To enshrine Lambert's relics, Hubertus built a basilica near Lambert's residence which became St. Lambert's Cathedral That cathedral was torn down starting in 1794 (its site is the modern Place Saint-Lambert), with Lambert's tomb being relocated to the Liège Cathedral, in which it still resides.

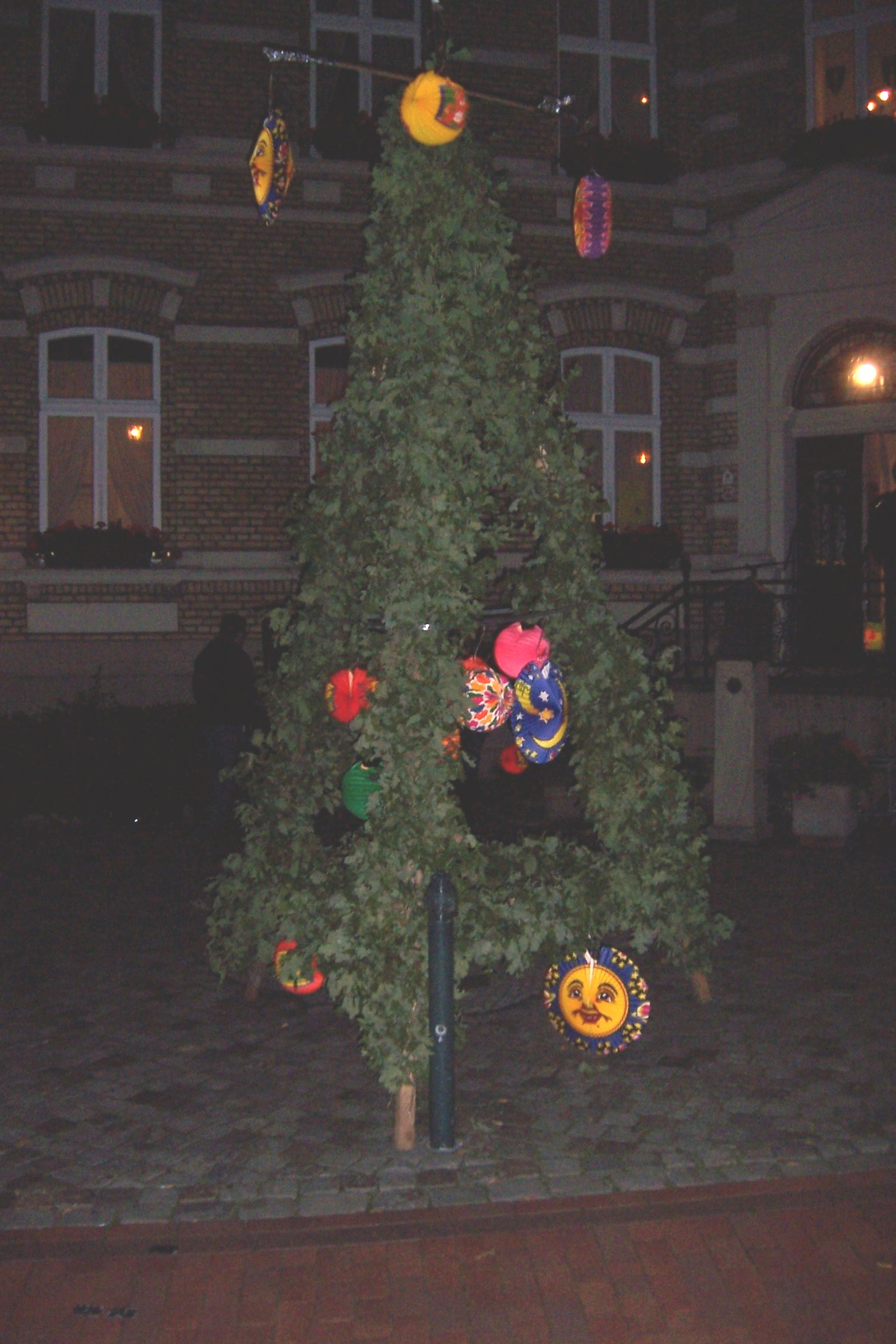
"Lambertus pyramid" in Münsterland.

== Patronage ==
Lambert is the patron of the city of Liège and of Freiburg im Breisgau, where a relic of his head is located since 1190.

His feast day in the Roman Catholic Church calendar is 17 September. The Lambertusfest in Münster has long been a folk holiday, celebrated for two weeks culminating on the eve of 17 September. Children build "Lambertus pyramids" of branches, decorated with lanterns and lamps around which they dance and sing traditional songs (known as Lambertussingen or Käskenspiel).

A few churches in Germany, Belgium, and The Netherlands are dedicated to Saint Lambert.

== Relics ==
Lambert's relics in Liège are kept in four glass jars, which in turn are held in a red box, which also holds documents related to previous examinations of the relics (done in 1896, 1938 and 1985, according to the Liège diocese). In October of 2023, they were opened again, and this time a medical investigation was to be done as well.
