= Prince-Bishops' Palace (Liège) =

Historic building in the centre of Liège, Belgium

Coordinates: 50°38′46″N 5°34′24″E

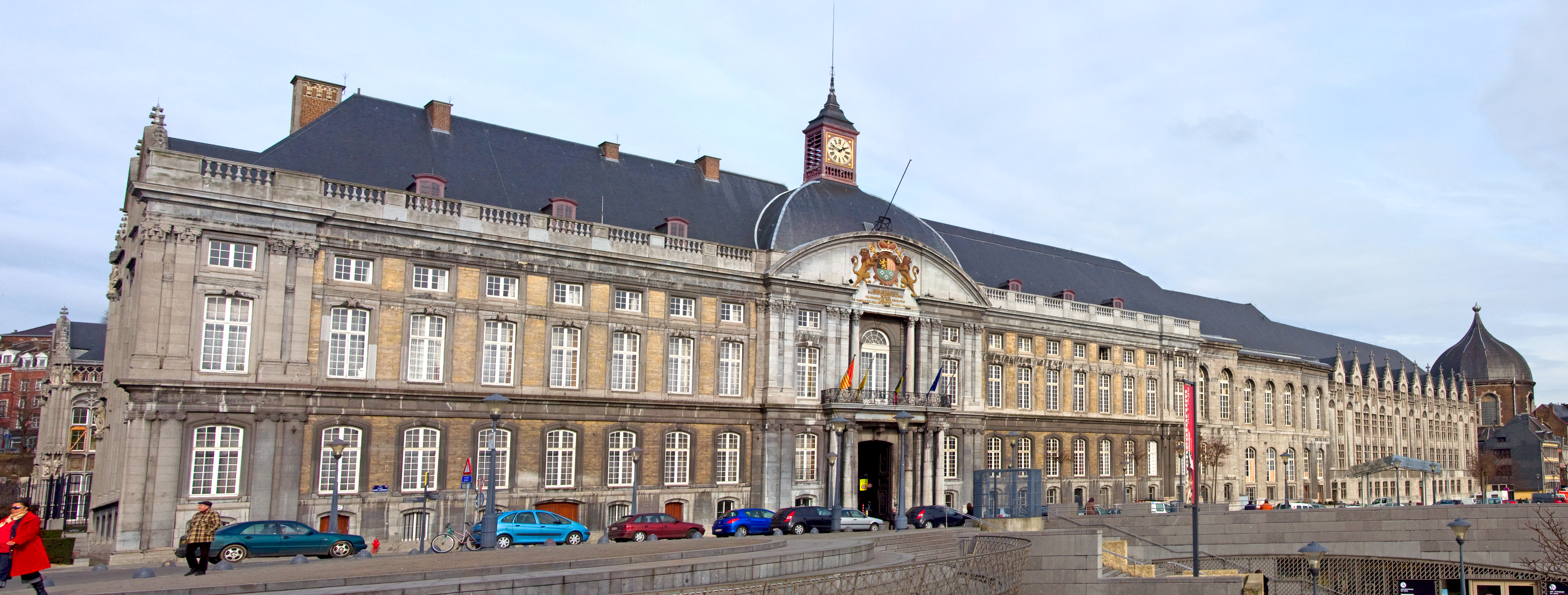
The Prince-Bishops' Palace in 2010

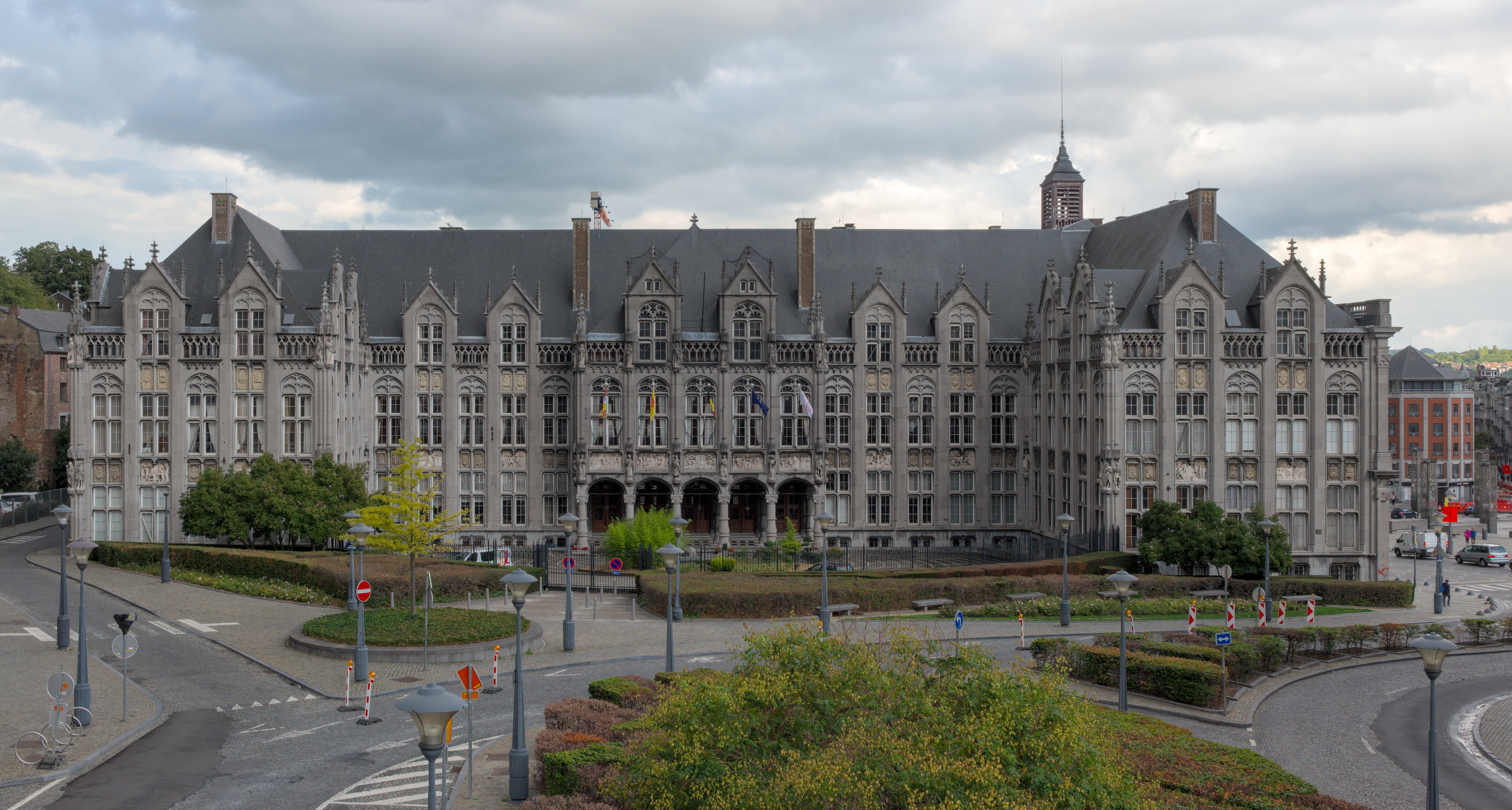
The west facade

The Palace of the Prince-Bishops (French: Palais des Princes-Evêques) is a historic building situated on the Place Saint-Lambert in the centre of Liège, Belgium. It was the residence of former Prince-Bishops of Liège and once faced the monumental Cathedral of St. Lambert. It now houses the Palace of Justice of Liège and the Provincial Palace, i.e. the government building of Liège Province.

== History ==
The Palace of the Prince-Bishops' imposing facade dominates the end of the Place Saint-Lambert, centre of commercial life in Liège, where the Cathedral of St. Lambert formerly stood. Two buildings preceded the present palace, a first palace integrated with the fortifications was built about 1000 CE by Bishop Notger, but it was destroyed by fire in 1185. The palace was reconstructed under Rudolf of Zähringen. This building was heavily damaged in the sack of the city by the Burgundians and was also burnt in 1505.

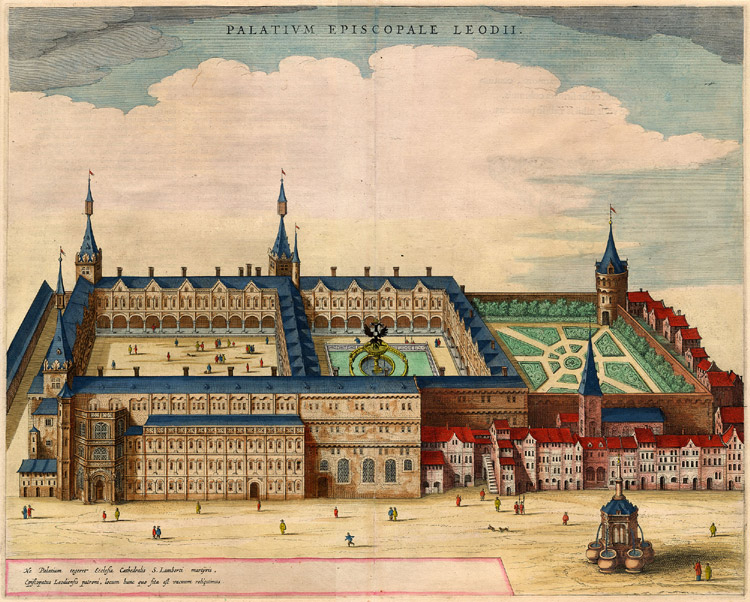
The palace in 1649

On mounting the episcopal throne in 1505, Bishop Érard de La Marck found the palace in ruins and entrusted the construction of a new one to the master builder Arnold van Mulken in 1526. It was finished at the end of the 16th century. The principal facade on the south was completely rebuilt after the fire of 1734 in the Louis XIV-Regency style under the direction of the Brussels architect Jan Andries Anneessens, son of François Anneessens. In 1849, a new west wing was built by the architect Jean-Charles Delsaux, in the same style as the old palace to accommodate the provincial government.

At present, the building is occupied by the provincial services and the Palace of Justice of Liège. The great courtyard is surrounded by galleries of arcades and 60 massives and elegant columns. The variety of the decoration of these columns is extraordinary. The second courtyard which is reached from the interior of the palace is more intimate and is closed to the public except on rare occasions such as heritage days. The judicial institutions of Liège having been dispersed in about ten sites in the city, a vast project to extend the palace was undertaken. It involved the construction of various buildings facing the west side of the palace and was completed in mid-2011.

== Bibliography ==
- Bruno Demoulin (ed.), Liège et le palais des princes-évêques, Bruxelles, Fonds Mercator, 2008, 320 p.
- Julie Godinas, Le palais de Liège, coeur de la Cité ardente, Namur, Institut du patrimoine wallon, 2008, 234 p.
- Suzanne Collon-Gevaert, Érard de La Marck et le palais des princes-évêques de Liège, Liège, Vaillant-Carmanne, 1975, 157 p.
- Jean Lejeune, De la principauté à la métropole, Mercator, Anvers, 1967
- Jean Lejeune, Liège et son palais, Mercator, 1979
