= Saint Lambert's Cathedral =

Saint Lambert's Church or Saint Lambert's Cathedral may refer to:

- Saint Lambert's Church, Münster, a Roman Catholic church in Münster, Germany, that features hanging cages that held the dismembered bodies of leaders of the Münster Rebellion
- St. Lambert's Church, Bergen, a Lutheran town church in Bergen, Germany
- Saint Lambert's Cathedral, Liège, a former Roman Catholic cathedral in Liège, Belgium
