= Alpaida =

Frankish noblewoman

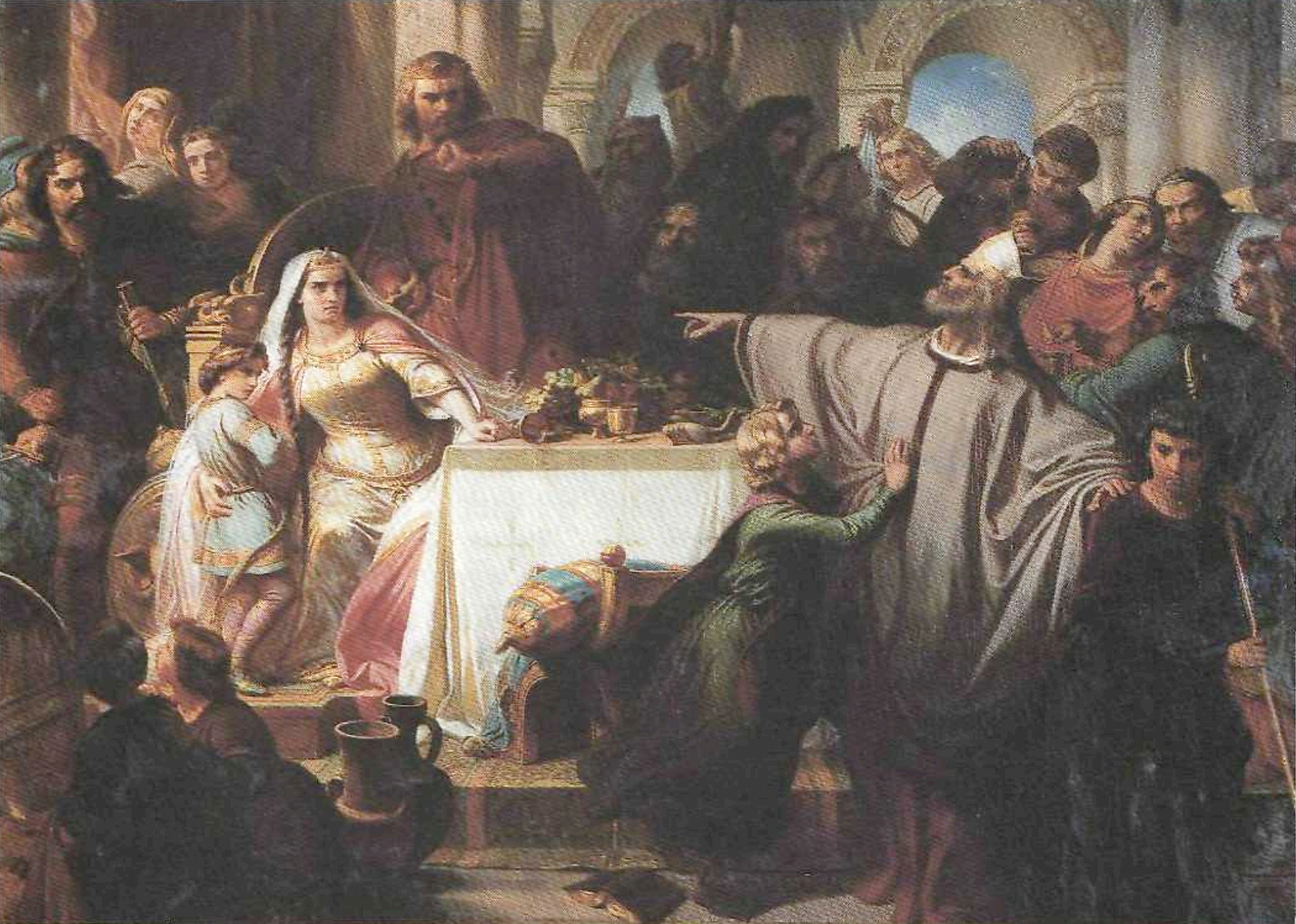
- Banquet of Jupille (1861) by Auguste Chauvin depicting Saint Lambert addressing Alpaida
- Born: c. 654
- Died: 714 (aged 59–60)
- Citizenship: Francia
- Spouse: Pepin of Herstal
- Children: Charles Martel; Childebrand I (disputed)

Alpaida (also Alpaïde, Alpaide, Alphaida, Alpoïde, Elphide, Elfide, Alféïde, Chalpaida; c. 654 – c. 714) was a Frankish noblewoman who hailed from the Liège area. She became the second wife, concubine or mistress of Pepin of Herstal and mother to his son Charles Martel and possibly another, Childebrand I.

In the Liber Historiae Francorum and the Continuations of Fredegar she is referred to as Pepin's wife.

Saint Lambert of Maastricht was a vocal critic of the relationship between Pepin and Alpaida. A tradition would eventually develop that, Pepin's domesticus (manager of state domains) Dodon, whose troops would murder Lambert, was in fact the brother of Alpaida; however, the historical accuracy of Dodon being her brother has been questioned.

== Notes ==
According to Sara McDougall, the way many medieval sources define and use the terms "second wife", "concubine" and "mistress" are unclear and do not align with how modern audiences understand and use those same terms in modern standards so it is unclear how medieval sources would have defined Alpaida's role within Pepin II's life in terms of their relationship.

It seems that in this time period, it was the mother and her lineage that shaped and determined the child's possibility to inherit from their father, so to discredit the child's claim to their father's inheritance, one must discredit the mother. This is reflected in the historiography around Alpaida, who was once called a second wife in eighth-century writings, re-labeled a concubine in later ninth century writings, and finally, as a result of possible anti-Charles Martel or anti-Carolingian sentiment, tenth-century written sources now called Charles Martel's legitimacy and claim to Pepin II's inheritance into question by challenging Alpaida's role within the Pippinid family.
