= Church of Saint Remaclus =

Church in Wallonia, Belgium

Coordinates: 50°23′47″N 05°23′43″E

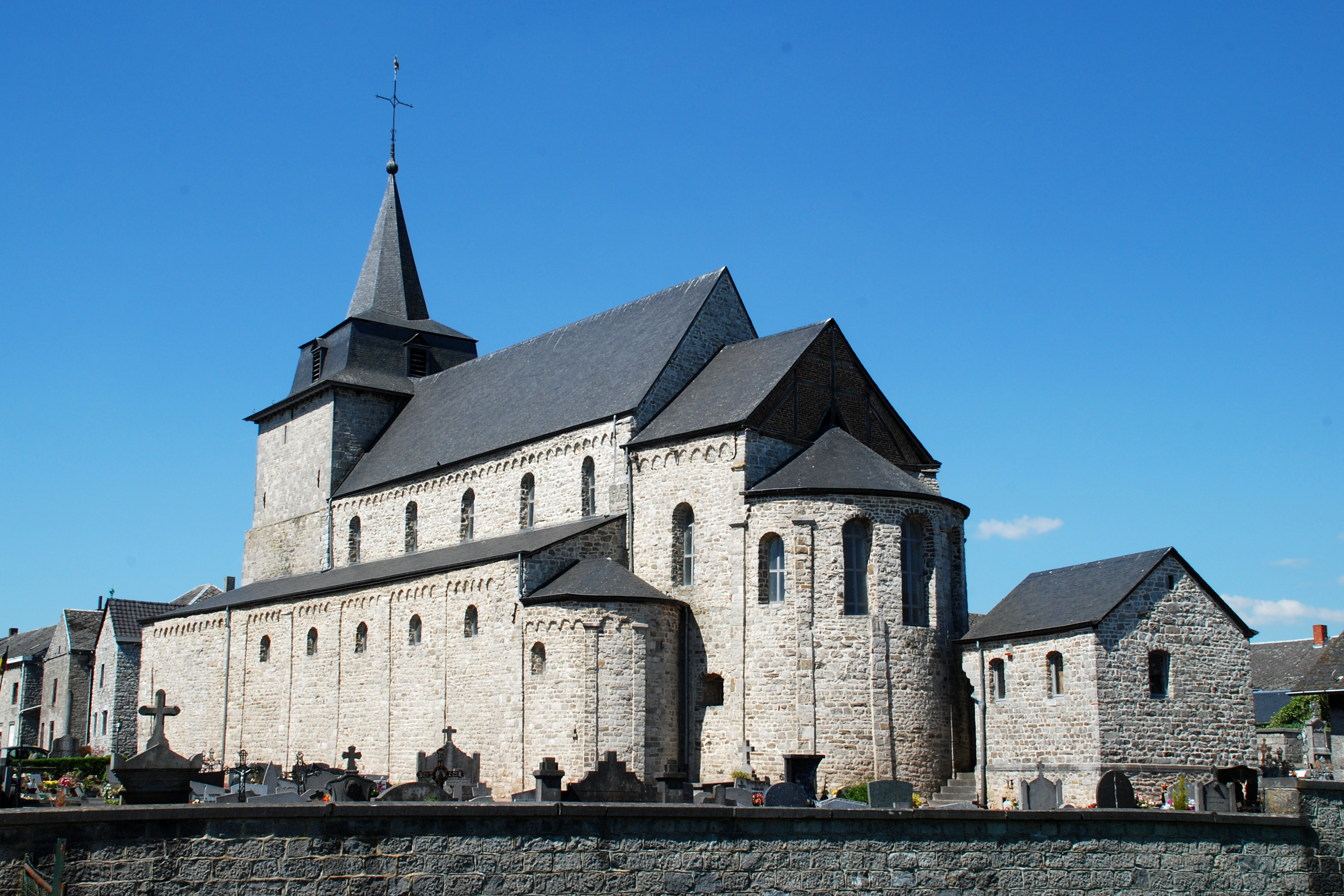
The Church of Saint Remaclus in Ocquier

The Church of Saint Remaclus is a Romanesque church in Ocquier, a district of the municipality of Clavier in Belgium. It is dedicated to Saint Remaclus. Built on the same site as at least two preceding churches, the current church dates from the middle of the 12th century. The church is a typical example of a kind of Romanesque country church which can be found in Belgium.

== History ==
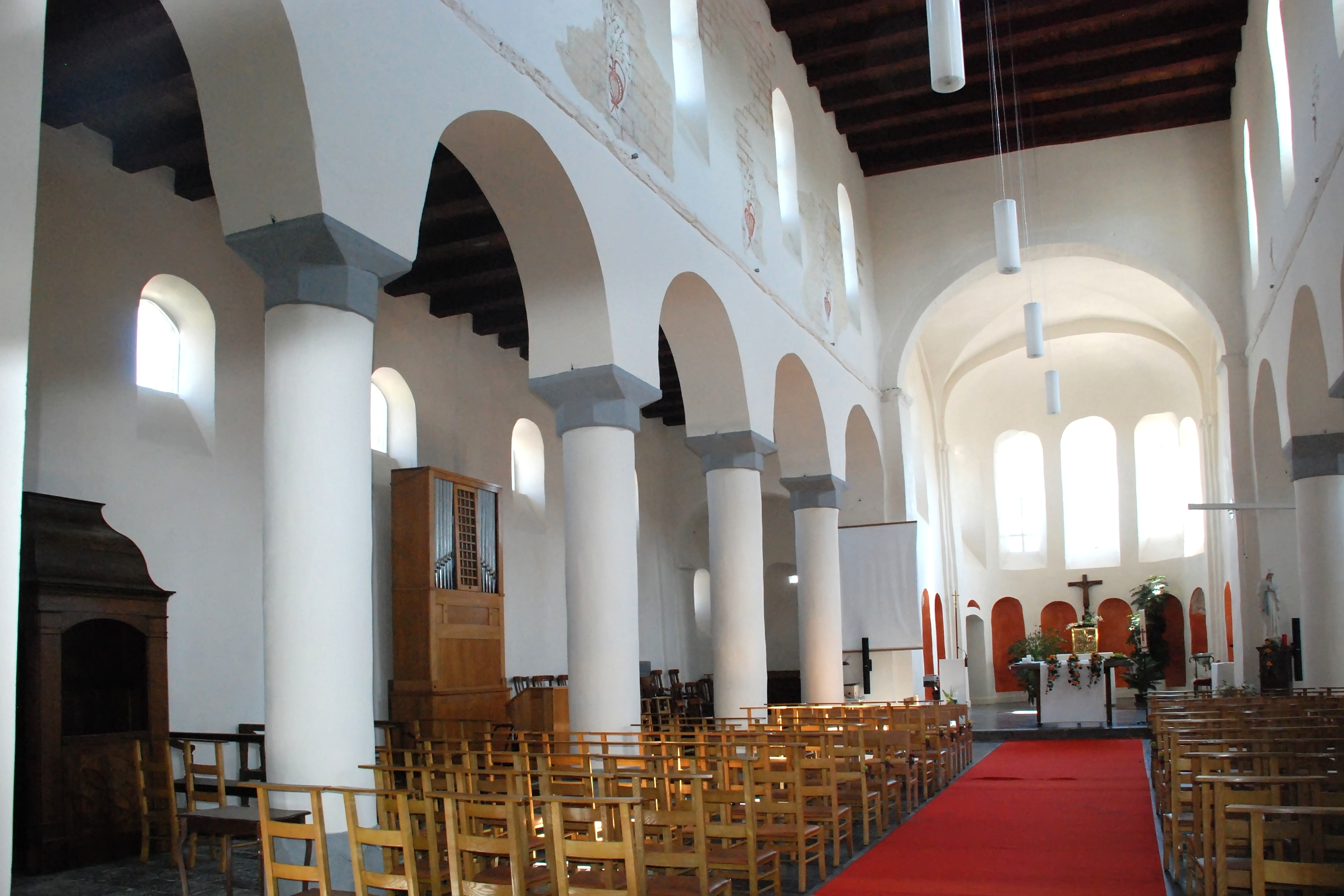
Interior view of the Church of Saint Remaclus

The current church building was erected on the site of two earlier, pre-Romanesque churches, the oldest of which was built during the 9th century. The current structure dates from the middle of the 12th century and was built as a priory, a dependency of the Princely Abbey of Stavelot-Malmedy. During repair works in the 17th century, a Roman inscribed stone tablet from the 2nd century was re-used as building material and incorporated into the current building. It was formally classified as cultural heritage in 1933. Restoration works were carried out on the church 1952–1953.

== Architecture ==
The church is a basilica in form, consisting of a western tower (since the 19th century open towards the nave), a central nave and two aisles. The chancel ends in an apse, and is flanked by two lower apses at the eastern end of the aisles. The columns supporting the ceiling date from the 16th century and replaced earlier piers. The building material is fieldstone, consisting of sandstone and limestone, and the roof is covered in slate. The church spire is from the 19th century. The church has been described as a typical example of a Belgian Romanesque country church.
