= Bois-et-Borsu =

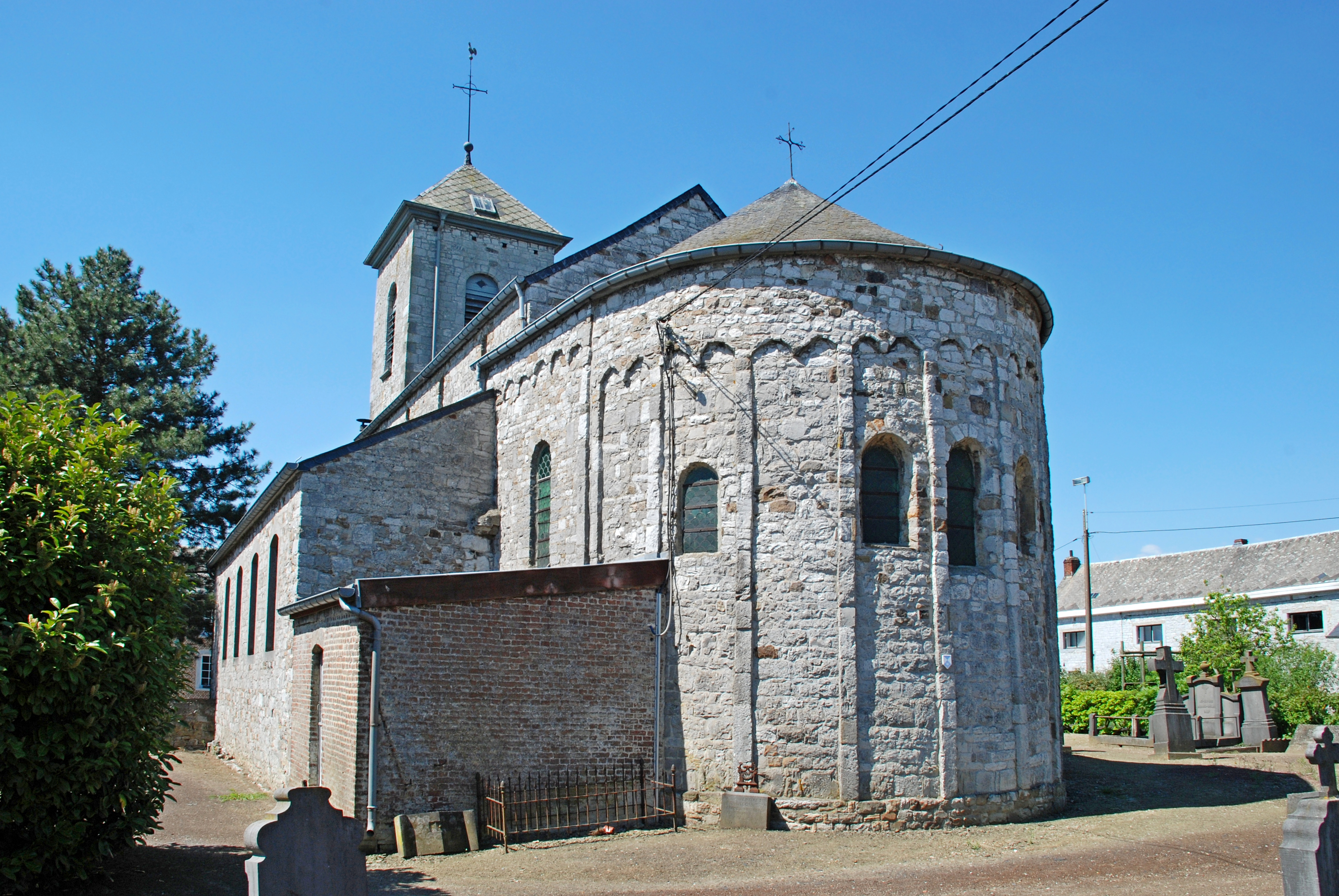
- Church of Saint Lambert, Bois-et-Borsu

- Location within Belgium Location within Europe
- Coordinates: 50°23′51″N 05°20′16″E
- Country: Belgium
- Region: Wallonia
- Province: Liège
- Municipality: Clavier

Bois-et-Borsu (French pronunciation: [bwa e bɔʁsy]) is a district of the municipality of Clavier, in the province of Liège in Wallonia, Belgium.

The village consisted of two settlements, Bois and Borsu, until they were merged in 1808. Of these, Bois is centred around the Church of Saint Lambert, founded in 911. The nave and chancel of the Romanesque church are listed as a historical monument, and the church contains unusual murals from the 15th century. The village also contains a fortified farm from the 13th century. In Borsu, the village church has foundations from the 12th century but is largely a building from the late 18th century, enlarged in 1935.
