= The Banquet of Jupille =

Painting by Auguste Chauvin

- Le Banquet de Jupille (French)
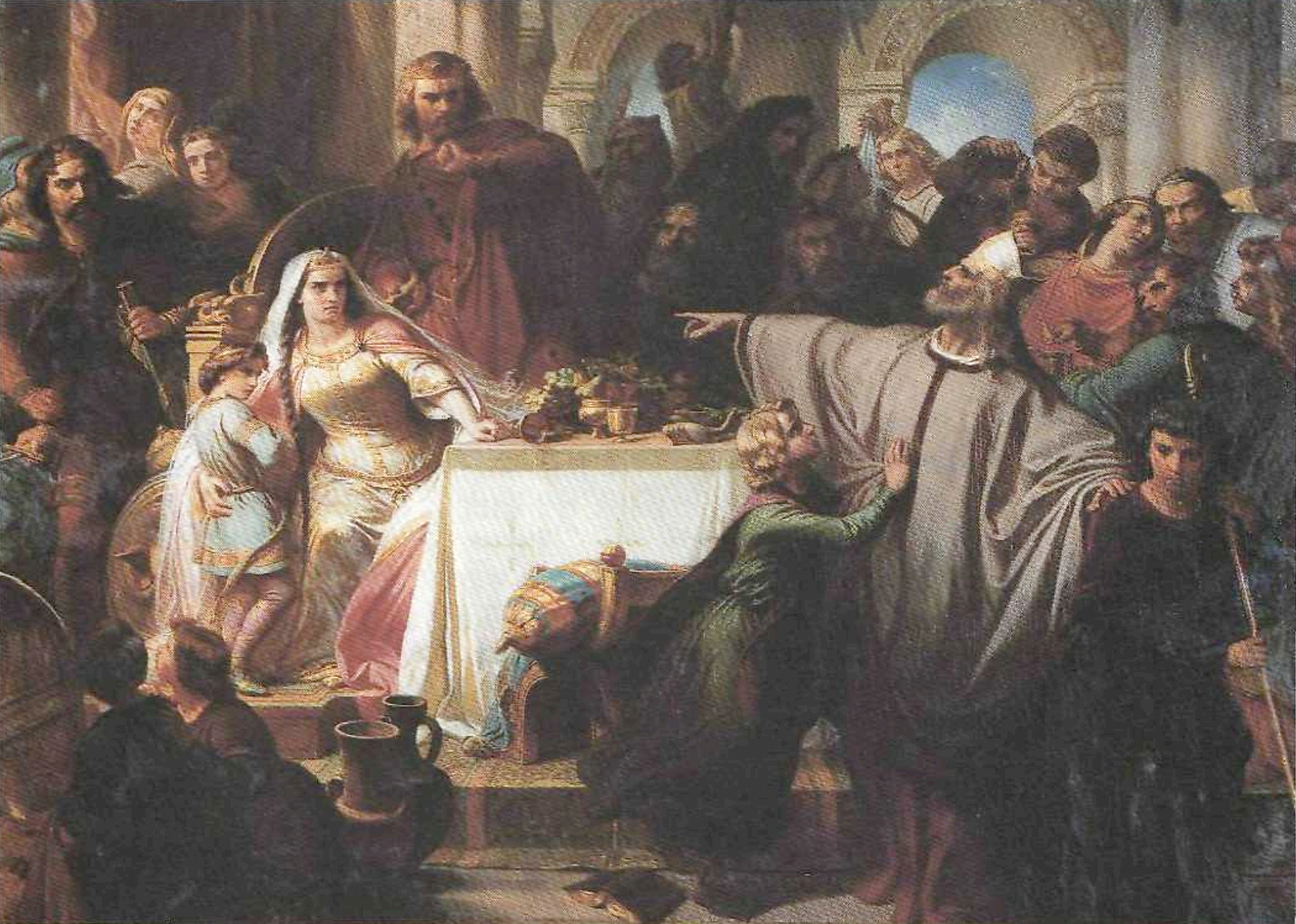
- Artist: Auguste Chauvin
- Year: 1861
- Medium: Oil on canvas
- Dimensions: 390 cm × 470 cm (150 in × 190 in)
- Location: Liège Cathedral

The Banquet of Jupille (French: Le Banquet de Jupille) is a painting by the Belgian painter Auguste Chauvin which was first exhibited in 1861.

The painting was commissioned by the Belgian state and the city of Liège in 1855 and is influenced by Italian Mannerism. It represents an incident in the life of Saint Lambert, an 8th-century bishop of Maastricht. The painting depicts Lambert rebuking Pepin of Herstal and Alpaida, Pepin's second wife and the mother of Charles Martel. Alpaida had usurped the place of Plectrude, Pepin's first and legitimate wife, and was attempting to obtain Lambert's blessing by getting him to bless her cup during a banquet offered by Pepin in Jupille, a village near the city of Liège. Shortly after the incident, Lambert was assassinated by the troops of Alpaida's brother Dodon, domesticus of Pepin.

The work was exhibited in 1861 in Antwerp, then in Berlin in 1862. It remained in the municipal collections of Liège, and in the reserves of the Walloon Art Museum from 1952, finally being moved from there in 1996. That same year, the painting was restored, and it has been exhibited since then at St. Paul's Cathedral in Liège.

== History ==
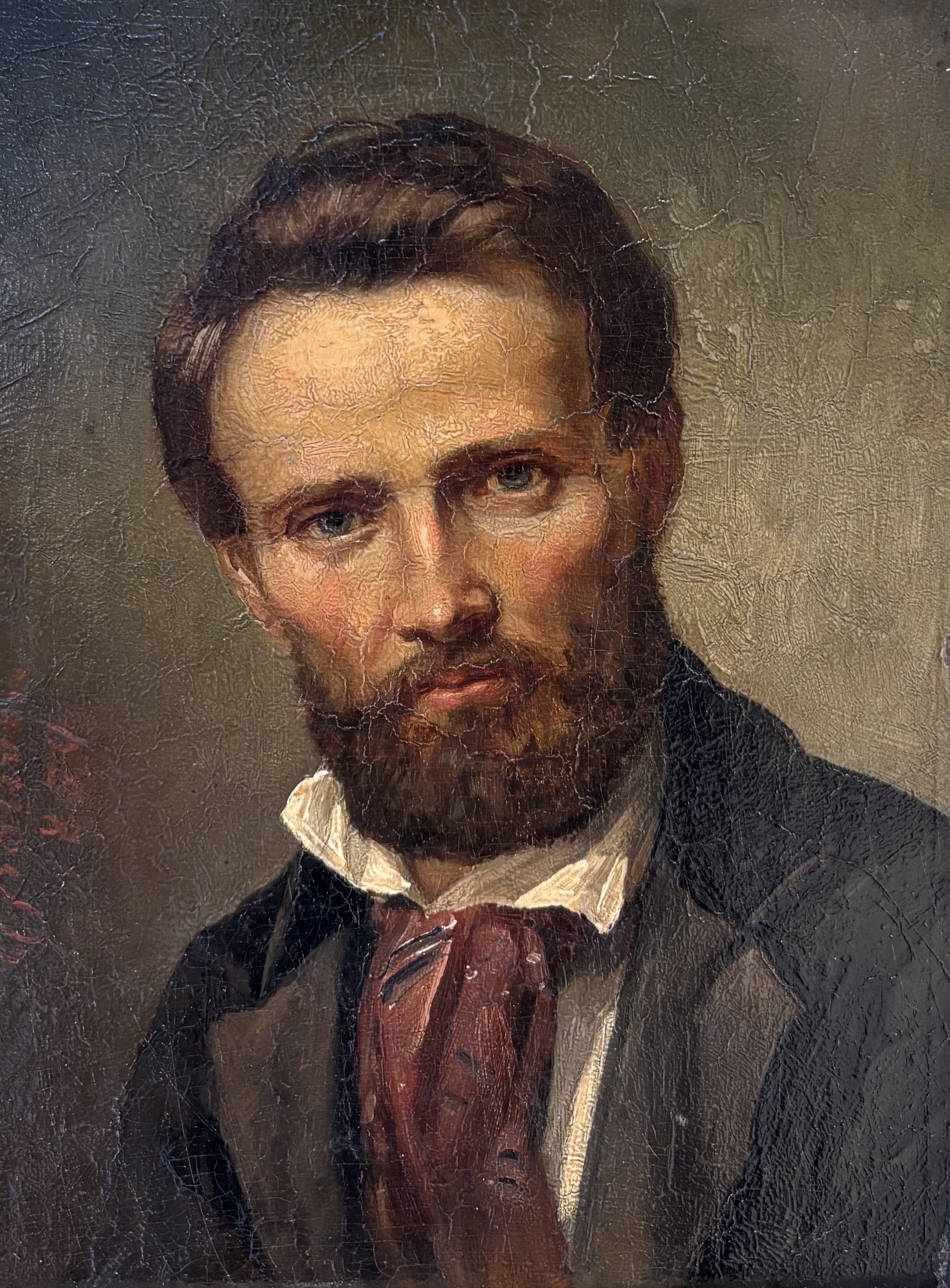
Self-portrait of Auguste Chauvin in the Walloon Art Museum

The contract by which the Belgian state and the city of Liège commissioned The Banquet of Jupille from Chauvin was signed on 1 May 1855. The sum specified was 10,000 Belgian Francs, with 3,000 Francs to be paid as an advance for the sketch, 3,000 Francs once half the work was complete and the remaining 4,000 Francs once the work had been completed. The city of Liège contributed 3,000 Francs and the rest was covered by the State. Chauvin started work on the subject immediately, finishing in 1861. The delay in its execution was due to Chauvin's illness and his dual functions as director of the Liège arts academy and interim professor of the antique drawing class.

When he completed and exhibited The Banquet of Jupille at the Antwerp Salon in 1861, Chauvin had not had any notable exhibitions for almost ten years, which was probably caused by his workload at the Academy, which had increased greatly following Barthélemy Vieillevoye's death in 1855.

== Description ==
The painting is also known as Saint Lambert at the Banquet of Pepin of Herstal, and Saint Lambert and Alpaida. It is a large-format oil painting, measuring 390 cm (150 in) × 470 cm (190 in). It depicts Saint Lambert, the bishop of Maastricht in 705 CE. Standing, he is seen addressing Pepin of Herstal and his second wife Alpaida. By having Alpaida at his side in place of his legitimate wife Plectrude, Pepin defied the laws of the Church, and Alpaida mixed her cup with those of the other guests to have it blessed by Lambert through trickery.

In 1843, Étienne de Gerlache provided a more detailed description of the legend, which served as inspiration for the painter in his work History of Liège from Caesar to Maximilian of Bavaria. He describes how Pepin, one day when he was in Jupille with his court, sent for Lambert. The bishop went to the palace, discovered preparations for a huge feast, and was welcomed by Pepin and Alpaida. As the guests took their seats at the banquet, Pepin asked Lambert to bless his cup first. He was soon imitated by all the courtiers, who also passed their cups to the bishop, and Alpaida also furtively slipped hers among the others. However, Lambert noticed Alpaida's manoeuvre and said to Pepin, "See the impudence of this woman, whose presence here is a public scandal, and who would like to make me her accomplice!" With these words, he abruptly left the table, and exited the palace.

The Jupille episode was mentioned previously in Liège historiography by Theodose Bouille in 1725 in the first volume of his History of the City and Country of Liège, and by Louis Dewez in 1822 in the first volume of his History of the Country of Liège. Philippe George, assistant at the University of Liège and curator of the Treasury of St. Paul's Cathedral, believes that it is difficult to know the exact source that inspired the artist.

== Exhibition ==
Once completed, the work was exhibited at the Antwerp Salon from 4 August 1861 to 30 September 1861. In December of the same year, it was installed at the municipal museum of Liège. The painting was exhibited in 1862 in Berlin. It remained in the collections of the Museum of Fine Arts at Liege, before passing into the collections of the Walloon Art Museum when the latter was created in 1952. At the Walloon Art Museum, it was rolled on a plywood cylinder, and put into storage. The painting is currently on display at St. Paul's Cathedral in Liège. It went through an extensive restoration process that began in April 1996, and was put on public display on 5 September 1996 as part of the commemorations of the death of Saint Lambert.
