= Terwagne =

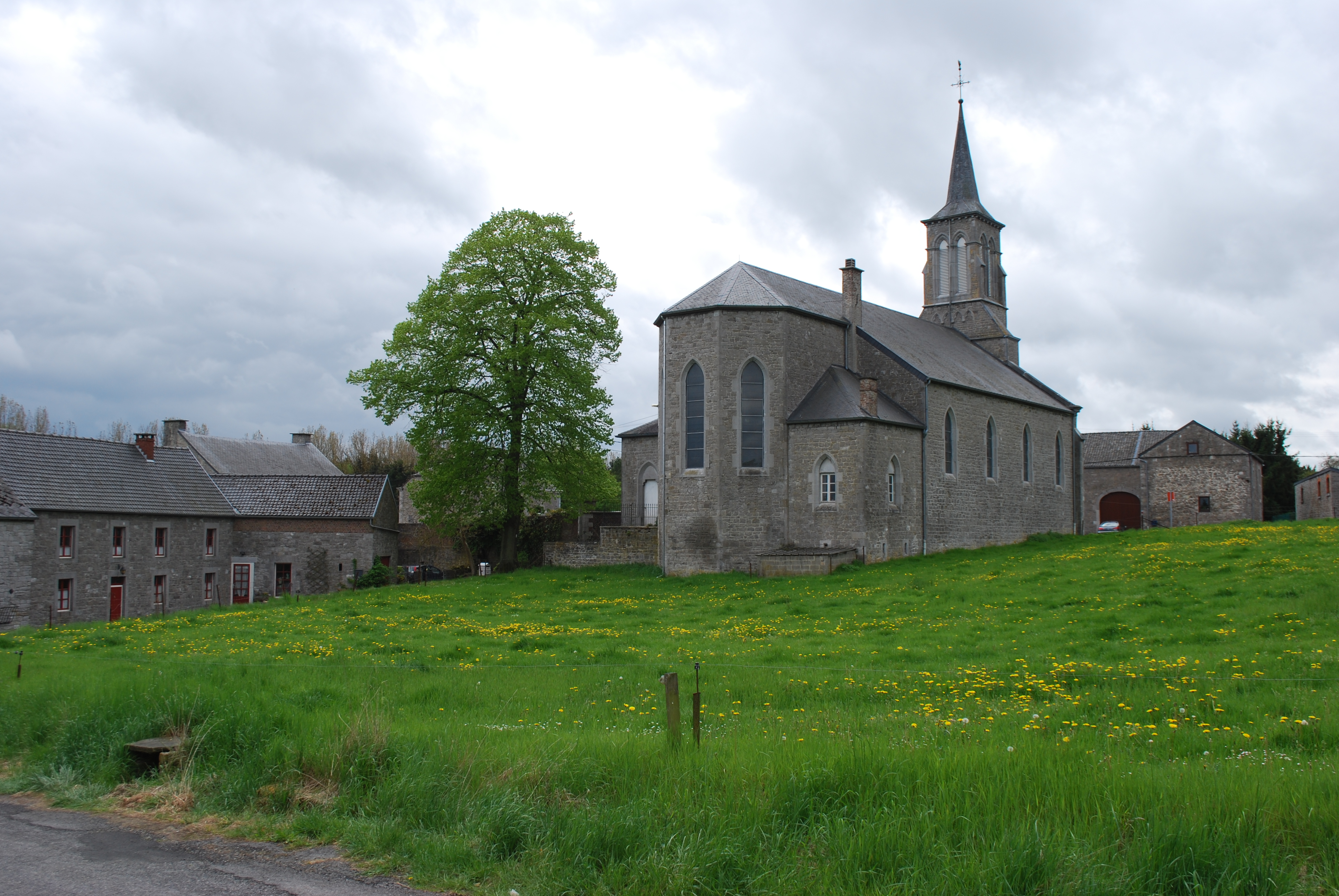
- Terwagne

- Location within Belgium Location within Europe
- Coordinates: 50°26′43″N 05°20′57″E
- Country: Belgium
- Region: Wallonia
- Province: Liège
- Municipality: Clavier

Terwagne (French pronunciation: [tɛʁwaɲ]) is a village and a district of the municipality of Clavier, located in the province of Liège in Wallonia, Belgium.

The first mention of Terwagne in written sources dates from 817. During the Middle Ages, a court of law existed here, and the village was an important stop-over on the trade route between Lombardy and Flanders; especially for the trade of Alsace wines. The village was one of a few which escaped devastation during the War of the Cow and later during the wars of Louis XIV.

The village church is in a Gothic Revival style, built in 1864. It contains several furnishings from the demolished Saint Lambert's Cathedral, Liège. The village also contains several historical buildings, some of which are medieval, including the fortified farmstead called la cense des Dames Blanches from the 13th century.
