= Theodard =

French Roman Catholic saint

Theodard was also the murdered bishop Theodard of Maastricht.

Saint Theodard (French: Théodard) (ca. 840–1 May, ca. 893) was an archbishop of Narbonne. He may have been born to the nobility and served as a subdeacon at a church council at Toulouse.

He was appointed archdeacon by Archbishop Sigebod of Narbonne (873-855). After Sigebod's death in 885, Theodard succeeded him and was consecrated on 15 August 885. In 886 he went to Rome to obtain the pallium, the symbol of his office, from Stephen VI.

During his episcopate, Theodard protected the rights of his diocese, repaired the damages caused by Moorish incursions, restored the cathedral of Narbonne, and worked to release captive Christians.

He was buried at the Benedictine Montauriol Abbey, initially dedicated to Saint Martin, which was later renamed after Theodard.

== See also ==
- Theodard of Maastricht
