= Place Saint-Lambert =

Square in Liège, Belgium

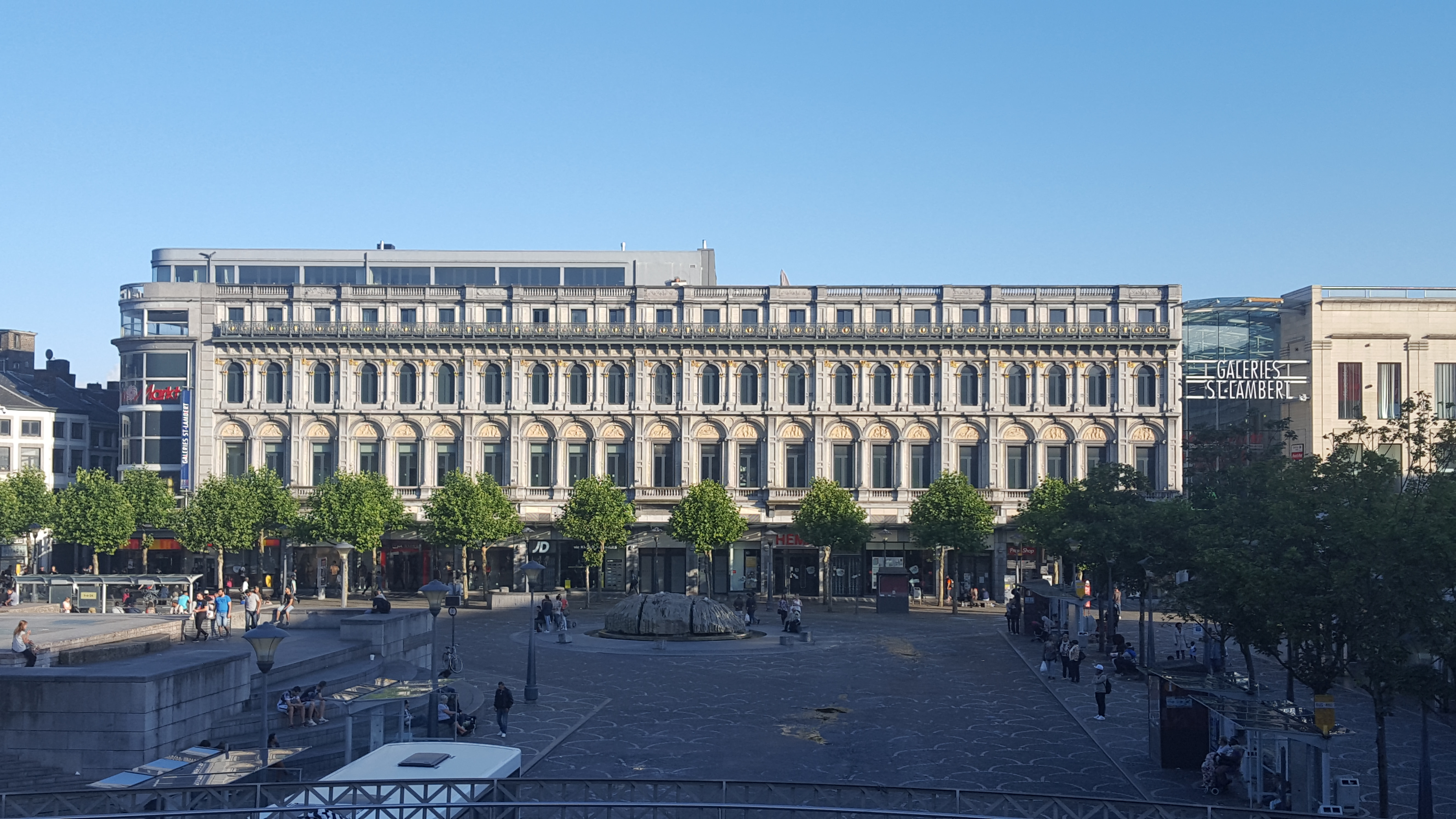
- The Place Saint-Lambert seen from the Prince-Bishops' Palace

- Location within Belgium
- Location: Liège, Belgium
- Coordinates: 50°38′43″N 5°34′25″E

The Place Saint-Lambert (French pronunciation: [plas sɛ̃ lɑ̃bɛʁ]) is a major square in the centre of Liège, Belgium. Until 1794, it was the site of St. Lambert's Cathedral. Remains of the foundations of the cathedral have been conserved, and are on display at the Archéoforum, under the square.

The largest public building on the square is the former Prince-Bishops' Palace, which now houses the Palace of Justice of Liège and the Provincial Palace, i.e. the government building of Liège Province.

The SNCB railway station Liège Saint-Lambert is located at the square. There is a large bus station in the lower part of the square, which serves as the local transport hub for the city. On 28 April 2025, a new tramline went into service with a stop in Place Saint-Lambert.

On 13 December 2011, a murder–suicide attack took place in the square, in which 6 people were killed and 125 were injured.

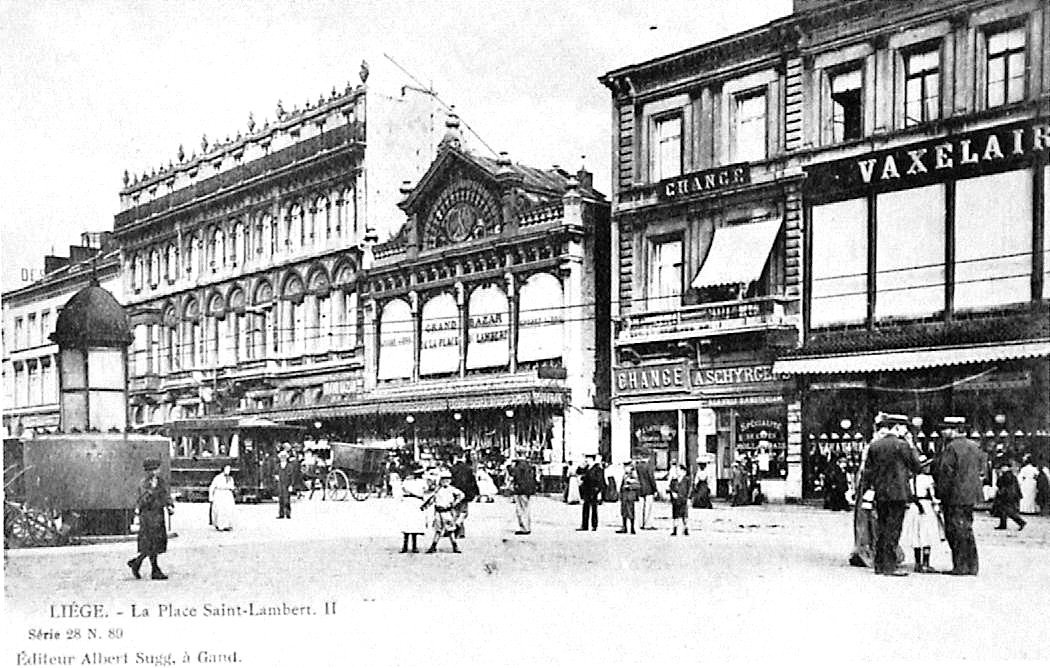
The Place Saint-Lambert and Grand Bazaar at the beginning of the 20th century

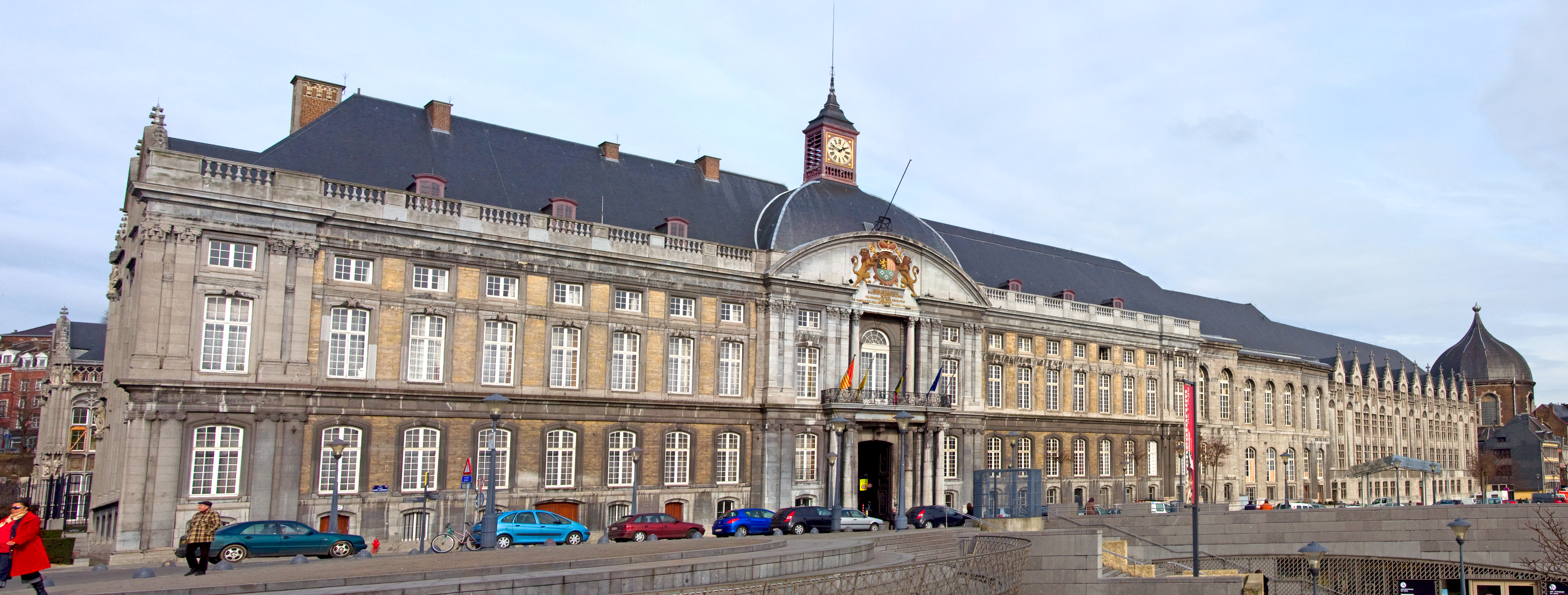
The former Prince-Bishops' Palace on the Place Saint-Lambert

== See also ==
- Belgium in "the long nineteenth century"
