= Archéoforum =

Archaeological museum in Liège, Belgium

Coordinates: 50.6453°N 5.5733°E

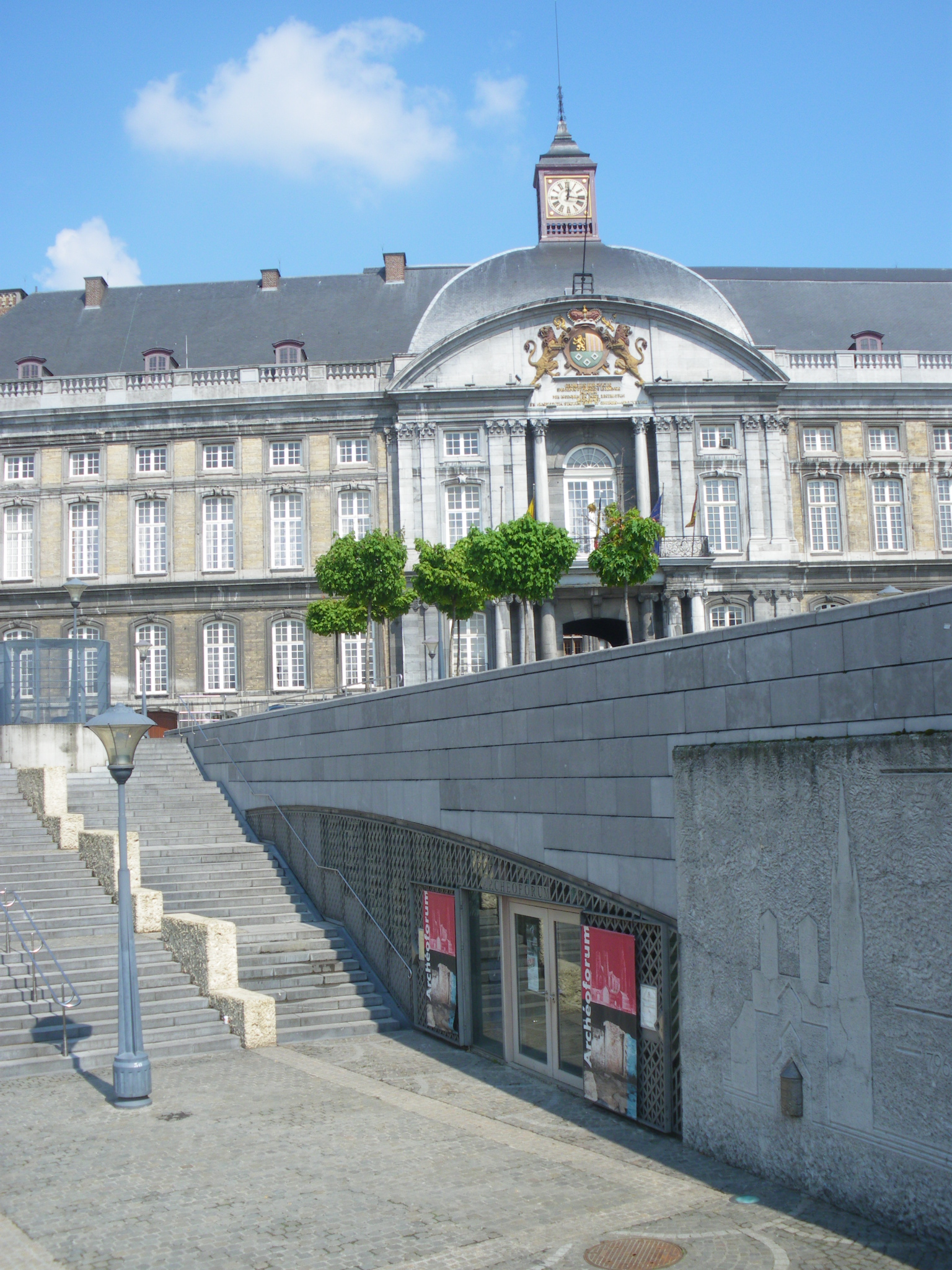
The museum entrance

The Archéoforum is an archaeological museum on place Saint-Lambert in Liège in Belgium. It is centered on the ruins of Saint Lambert's Cathedral and also includes the remains of a Gallo-Roman villa as well as displaying objects from the Mesolithic onward.
