= Theodard of Maastricht =

7th-century bishop of Maastricht-Liège

Saint Theodard of Maastricht
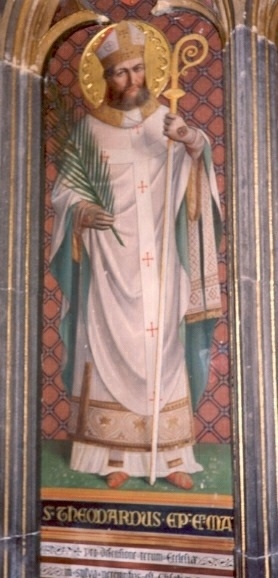
- Saint Theodard, St-Paul's Cathedral, Liège
- Born: Speyer, Germany
- Died: c. 670; Rülzheim, Germany
- Venerated in: Roman Catholic and Orthodox churches
- Canonized: Pre-canonical
- Feast: 10 September
- Attributes: Sword
- Patronage: Drover, cattle dealers

Theodard of Maastricht or Theodard of Tongeren (also Diethardt or Dodart) was a 7th-century bishop of Maastricht in the Low Countries (now in the Netherlands). As Theodard was murdered while on his way to protest the plundering of his diocese by Frankish nobles, he is considered a martyr. His feast day is 10 September. Theodard was uncle to his successor Lambert of Maastricht, and therefore brother or brother-in-law to Robert II, Lord Chancellor of France.

== Sources ==
What little we know about Theodard comes from a 7th-century biography, probably written by Heriger of Lobbes. There is also a later biography by Anselm of Liège.

== Life ==
Theodard was born in the area of Speyer in the Rhineland, early in the 7th century. He may have been a disciple of Remaclus at Stavelot Abbey. When Remaclus became bishop of Tongeren-Maastricht around 653, Theodard succeeded him as abbot of the double monastery of Stavelot-Malmedy. When Remaclus retired to Stavelot in 663, Theodard succeeded him as bishop of Maastricht. His biographers describe him as a cheerful and likeable person who performed his role as bishop with great energy and pastoral care. As bishop, he built and restored churches, founded monasteries, promoted evangelization, and charity.

He was murdered, probably around 670, while on a journey through the forest of Bienwald south of Speyer, close to the village of Rülzheim, on his way to seek justice from Childeric II of Austrasia in a legal dispute regarding Frankish nobles plundering the diocese. It is generally suspected that the murder was carried out on behalf of the nobles.

At first buried at the scene in Rülzheim, his body was later transferred to Liège by his nephew and successor, Lambert of Maastricht.

== Veneration ==
Because he was murdered on his way to defend the rights of the Church, he was honored as a martyr. A chapel was built at his place of death and original burial in Rülzheim, called the "Dieterskirchel". The place became an important pilgrimage site and is one of the oldest in the diocese of Speyer.

Baronius added his name to the Roman Martyrology when it was revised in the late 16th century. Theodard is venerated as the patron saint of drovers, cattle dealers and the city of Maastricht.

There is a 20th-century church dedicated to Theodard in the Belgian municipality of Beringen.

== See also ==
- Theodard

== Sources ==
- Paul Burns, Butler's Lives of the Saints (2000), pp. 90–1.
- Rudolf Kern, Quellen, Leben und Verehrung Theodards - eines bei Rülzheim ermordeten frühmittelalterlichen Bischofs aus Maastricht (Ubstadt-Weiher: verlag regionalkultur, 2024) ISBN 978-3-95505-453-3.
