= Ocquier =

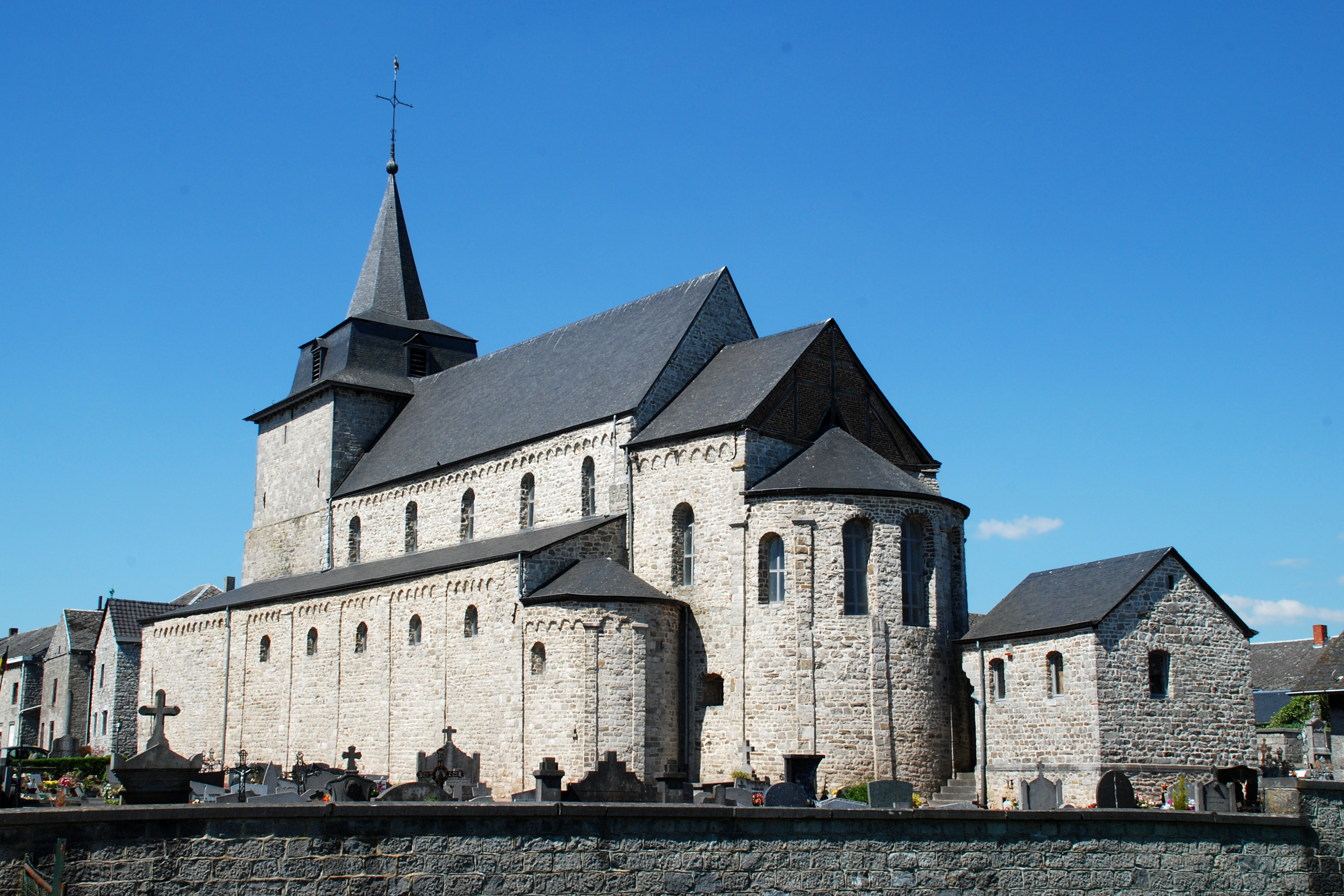
- Church of Saint Remaclus in Ocquier

- Location within Belgium Location within Europe
- Coordinates: 50°23′45″N 05°23′43″E
- Country: Belgium
- Region: Wallonia
- Province: Liège
- Municipality: Clavier

Ocquier (French pronunciation: [ɔkje]) is a district of the municipality of Clavier, in the province of Liège in Wallonia, Belgium.

The history of the village goes back to Roman times, when it was an important colony on the road between Cologne and Reims. From the 8th century, the village was a dependence of the Princely Abbey of Stavelot-Malmedy. The Church of Saint Remaclus in Ocquier is a well-preserved Romanesque rural church.
