= List of protected heritage sites in Clavier, Liège =

This table shows an overview of the protected heritage sites in the Walloon town Clavier. This list is part of Belgium's national heritage.

Object	Year/architect	Town/section	Address	Coordinates	Number^{?}	Image
Border marker called "Li pire al gatte" ^{(nl)} ^{(fr)}		Clavier		50.427718°N 5.409589°E	61012-CLT-0001-01 Info	
Choir and nave of the church of St. Lambert ^{(nl)} ^{(fr)}		Clavier	Bois	50.397538°N 5.337471°E	61012-CLT-0005-01 Info	Het koor en het middenschip van de kerk Saint-Lambert
Tower of the church of St. Martin ^{(nl)} ^{(fr)}		Clavier	les Avins-en-Condroz	50.415489°N 5.299421°E	61012-CLT-0006-01 Info	
Public square called "Bati de Pair" and surroundings with linden tree ^{(nl)} ^{(fr)}		Clavier		50.444276°N 5.402622°E	61012-CLT-0007-01 Info	
Organs of the church of St. Martin ^{(nl)} ^{(fr)}		Clavier		50.415533°N 5.299336°E	61012-CLT-0008-01 Info	
Church of St. Remacle ^{(nl)} ^{(fr)}		Clavier		50.396524°N 5.395447°E	61012-CLT-0010-01 Info	Kerk Saint-Remacle
Moins courtyard and surrounding walls ^{(nl)} ^{(fr)}		Clavier		50.397321°N 5.395578°E	61012-CLT-0011-01 Info	
chapel of St. Vierge ^{(nl)} ^{(fr)}		Clavier		50.413752°N 5.244191°E	61012-CLT-0012-01 Info	
2 linden trees at entrance to the graveyard of "Bati de Pair" ^{(nl)} ^{(fr)}		Clavier		50.442014°N 5.402405°E	61012-CLT-0013-01 Info	
Castle Vervoz ^{(nl)} ^{(fr)}		Clavier		50.392564°N 5.362547°E	61012-CLT-0014-01 Info	
Ice cellar and water pump of the castle ^{(nl)} ^{(fr)}		Clavier	Allée du puits, Ochain	50.428789°N 5.365999°E	61012-CLT-0015-01 Info	
Old house ^{(nl)} ^{(fr)}		Clavier	rue Roi Albert n°1	50.426828°N 5.356584°E	61012-CLT-0016-01 Info	
Organs of the church of St. Martin ^{(nl)} ^{(fr)}		Clavier	Borsu	50.388440°N 5.321780°E	61012-CLT-0018-01 Info	
"Aux Gives" farmhouse ^{(nl)} ^{(fr)}		Clavier	Roua n°17	50.397346°N 5.390705°E	61012-CLT-0019-01 Info	
Houyoux Mechanical elevator and building it is housed in;turbine and canal for water runoff ^{(nl)} ^{(fr)}		Clavier		50.410508°N 5.291609°E	61012-CLT-0020-01 Info	
Hoyoux Waterway ^{(nl)} ^{(fr)}		Clavier		50.427177°N 5.314337°E	61012-CLT-0021-01 Info	
Survillers mill ^{(nl)} ^{(fr)}		Clavier	rue du Val n°1 en rue de Survillers n°1 en 2	50.424780°N 5.300625°E	61012-CLT-0022-01 Info	
Border marker called "Pierre au Loup" ^{(nl)} ^{(fr)}		Clavier		50.406660°N 5.388013°E	61012-CLT-0023-01 Info	
Border marker called "Fond du Val" ^{(nl)} ^{(fr)}		Clavier		50.427713°N 5.409586°E	61012-CLT-0024-01 Info	
Border marker called "Terre al Masse" ^{(nl)} ^{(fr)}		Clavier		50.417616°N 5.404415°E	61012-CLT-0025-01 Info	
Old house ^{(nl)} ^{(fr)}		Clavier	Roi Albert au n°3	50.426976°N 5.356850°E	61012-CLT-0026-01 Info	
Castle Vervoz and surroundings ^{(nl)} ^{(fr)}		Clavier		50.392564°N 5.362547°E	61012-PEX-0001-01 Info	

== See also ==
- List of protected heritage sites in Liège (province)
