= Saint Lambert's Cathedral, Liège =

Belgian cathedral destroyed in 1794

Coordinates: 50.6455°N 5.57404°E

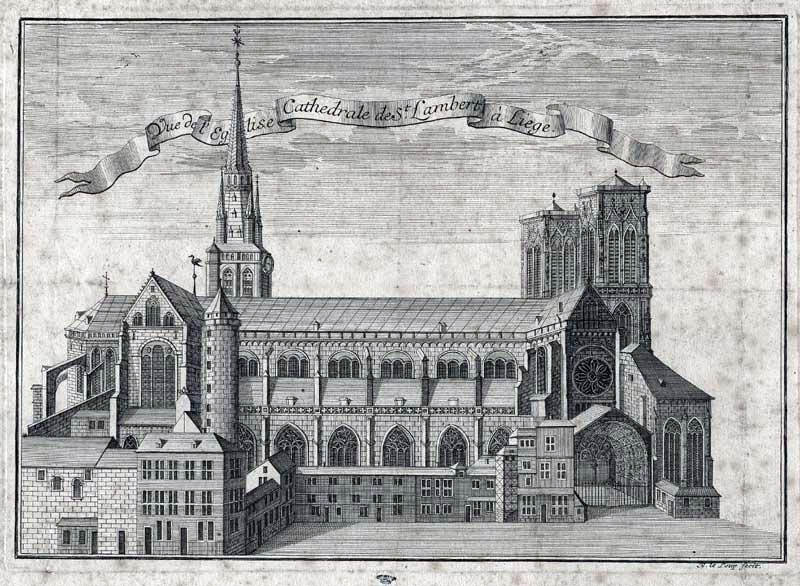
Engraving of St. Lambert's Cathedral by Remacle Le Loup (1735)

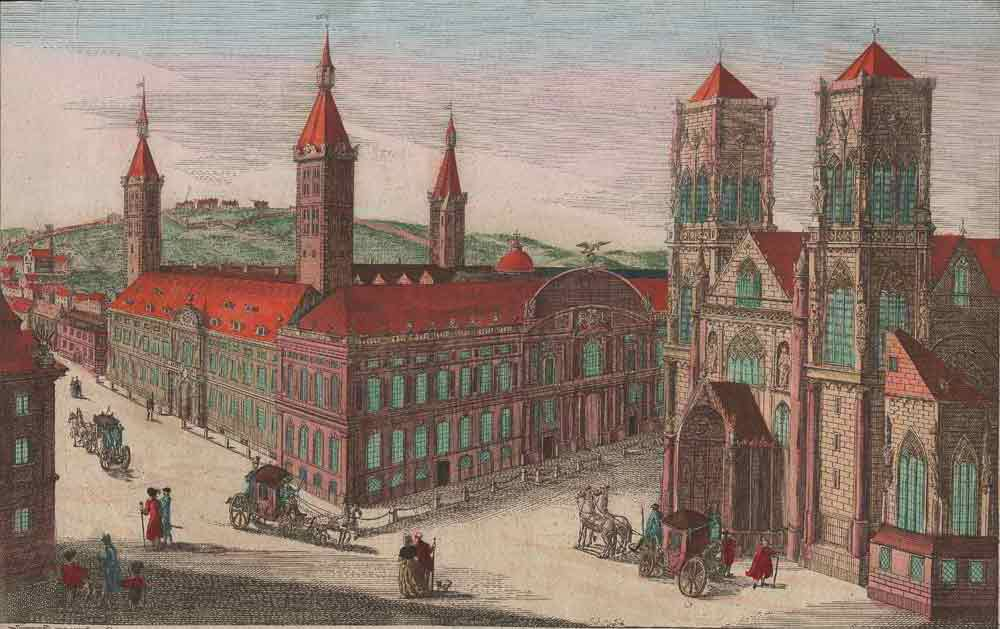
St. Lambert's Cathedral and Palace, 18th century

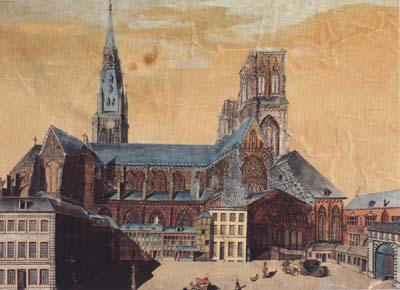
St. Lambert's Cathedral, 1780

St. Lambert's Cathedral (or in full, the Cathedral of Our Lady and St. Lambert; French: Cathédrale Notre-Dame-et-Saint-Lambert) was the Roman Catholic cathedral of Liège, modern-day Belgium, until 1794, when its destruction began. This enormous Gothic cathedral, dedicated to Saint Lambert of Maastricht, occupied the site of the present Place Saint-Lambert in the centre of Liège.

== History ==
Saint Lambert, bishop of Maastricht, was assassinated in Liège about 705, and was initially buried in Maastricht. The site of his martyrdom became a place of pilgrimage, and his successor, Saint Hubert, returned the body and reburied it there. Shortly afterwards, the bishop's seat was transferred from Maastricht to Liège, and Lambert's shrine became a cathedral.

Several structures succeeded each other on the site. The first was a martyr's shrine or mausoleum (martyrium), commissioned by Saint Hubert. Unusually, it was oriented to the west, which may account for the existence of a west choir in later cathedral buildings. Two cathedrals followed. The first, built towards the end of the 8th century, was in Carolingian style.

In 978, Bishop Notger installed a chapter of sixty canons. He then built a new church from around the year 1000, in Ottonian style, with a special crypt for the relics of the martyred saint. The architecture was that of the Holy Roman Empire. The new cathedral had a massive westwork, two choirs at opposite ends, two transepts, each with a tower over the crossing, adding to the monumentality of the structure, and a cloister at the east end. It is noticeable from the groundplan that the entrances were in the north and south sides of the building, and not along the east–west axis. Frederic of Lorraine, later Pope Stephen IX, was canon and archdeacon of this church before being raised to the cardinalate by Pope Victor II.

Many alterations were made to it during the decades 1140–1180.

The disgraced and excommunicated Emperor Henry IV, who died on 7 August 1106, was buried here by the Prince-Bishop Otbert, after the entrails and heart had been removed. The German bishops protested and declared that the cathedral would be considered contaminated as long as the body stayed there. Emperor Henry V therefore had his father's remains disinterred and moved to Speyer Cathedral, on 15 August 1106.

During the night of 28–29 April 1185, a violent fire broke out in one of the houses next to the cloisters, to which it immediately spread, and from there to the rest of the cathedral, which was destroyed. Reconstruction began the next day, in the Gothic style, extensively using the previous foundations. Part of the cathedral had been restored by 1189, when the Archbishop of Cologne visited to reconsecrate the church. In 1197, the relics of Saint Lambert, which had been in safe storage since the fire, were reinstalled in the new building.

The reconstruction was far from complete, for lack of funds. Processions criss-crossed the diocese in an effort to raise the necessary money. In the middle of the 13th century, Pope Innocent IV granted indulgences to anyone who helped with the rebuilding of the cathedral.

From 1391, work started on a tower 135 metres high, west of the south arm of the eastern transept, whose bell tower was as high as the hill of the citadel, and for the rest of its existence was a landmark for all who approached the city. Its completion in 1433 marked the end of the major works.

St. Lambert's Cathedral was 96 metres long (or 173 metres including the cloisters). With the side chapels it was 37 metres wide. It was some 30 metres high to the top of the ceiling vault. In style, if not in size, it was comparable to the cathedral of Notre-Dame de Paris. The sandstone towers that characterised the west front were closely related to those of the Cathedral of St. Michael and St. Gudula in Brussels, and of the Grote Kerk in Breda, in the Netherlands, as well as of the Basilica of Our Lady in Tongeren.

The Archéoforum of Liège, beneath the Place Saint-Lambert, makes it possible to see the ruins of the cathedral, besides the traces of other occupations of the site from the prehistoric period up to the 18th century.

=== Church of Our Lady with the Font ===
The Church of Our Lady with the Font (French: Église Notre-Dame-des-Fonts) was a small church adjacent to the cathedral. The church held a notable baptismal font. Charlotte Stuart, Duchess of Albany, illegitimate daughter of Charles Edward Stuart, was baptised there on 29 October 1753.

== Destruction ==
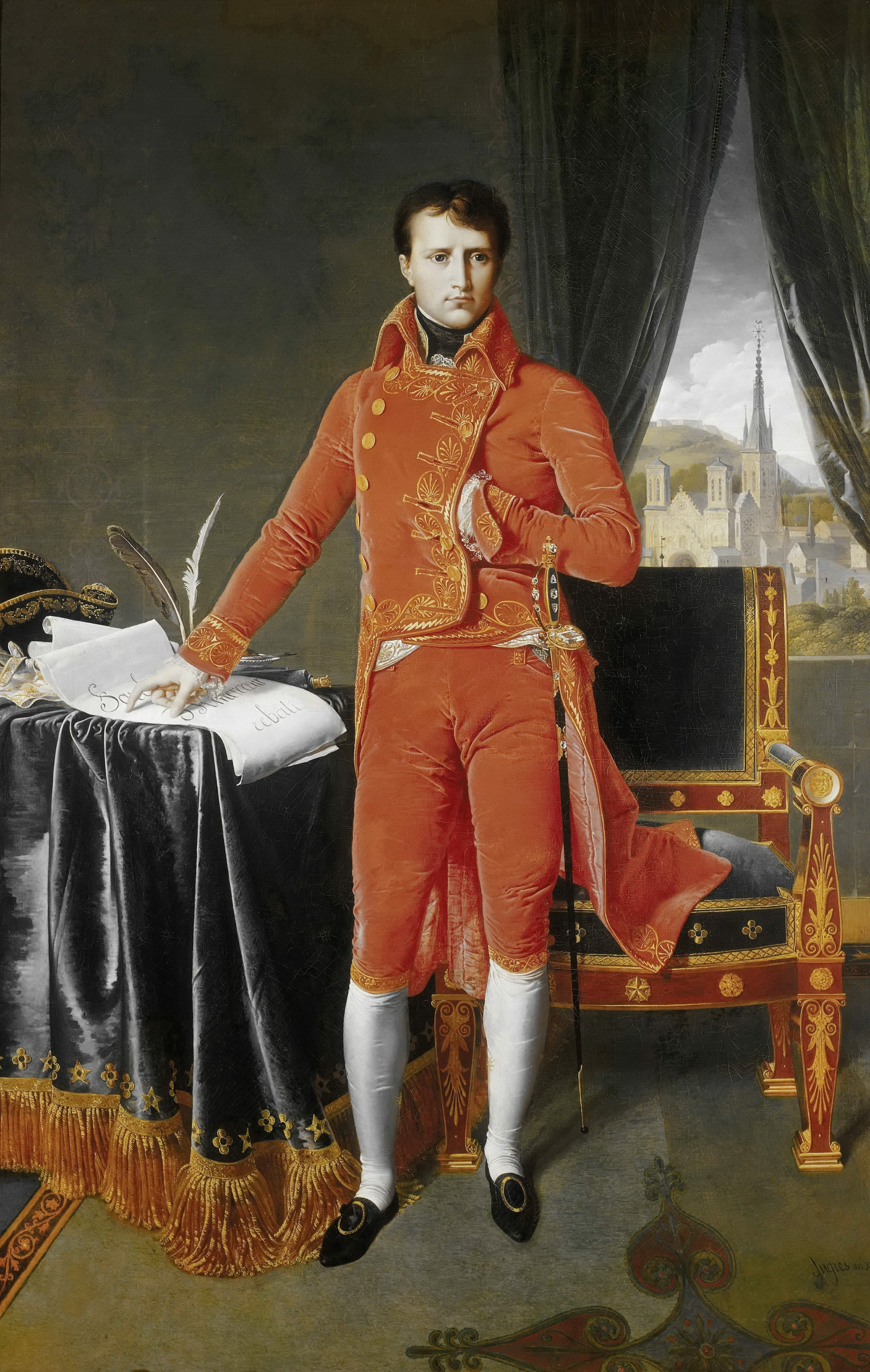
Bonaparte, First Consul (Ingres, 1804). In the background St. Lambert's Cathedral is distinctly visible, although at this period it was already in the process of demolition by the Liège revolutionaries.

In 1794, under the French regime, after the Liège Revolution, the demolition of the cathedral, agreed the previous year, was put in hand. The Liège revolutionaries considered it a symbol of the power of the prince-bishop. Demolition began with the removal of the lead from the roof for use in the manufacture of arms and munitions, under the supervision of a Commission destructive de la cathédrale. Consideration of the destruction of the great tower began in 1795. In 1803, the western towers were demolished. The site was entirely levelled in 1827, except for a section of masonry from the ancient passage between the cathedral and the bishop's palace, which was still standing in 1929.

Once the revolutionary mood had passed, another church had to be chosen to replace the destroyed cathedral. The Collegiate Church of St. Paul was selected as being, of those suitable, the nearest to the centre of the city, and this became the present Liège Cathedral (or St. Paul's Cathedral, Liège). After it had been sensitively modernised, the numerous treasures that had been saved from the old cathedral – works of gold, ivory, manuscripts, sculptures and reliquaries – which can be seen displayed in the cloisters, were transferred to it. The site is maintained today by the Institut du Patrimoine, the institute in charge of cultural heritage protection in Wallonia. Some of the furnishings have furthermore been preserved in the village church of Terwagne.

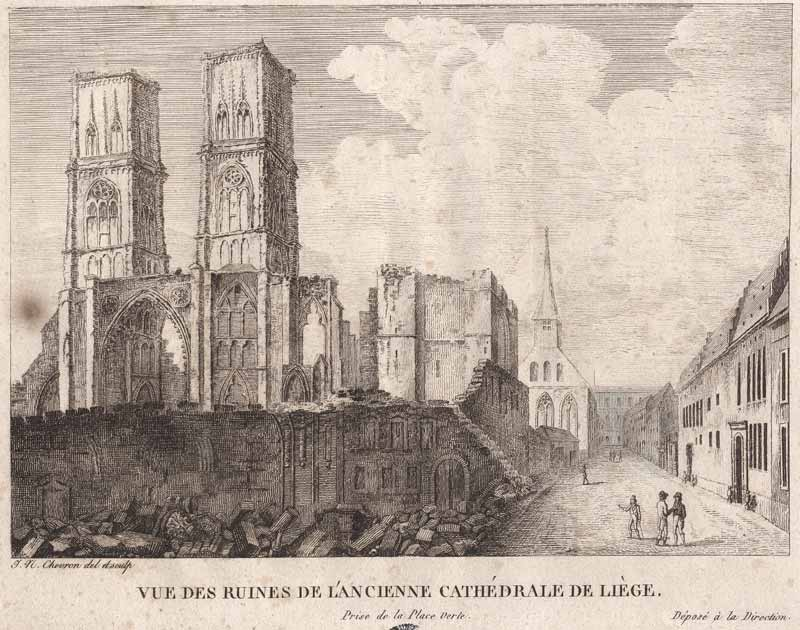

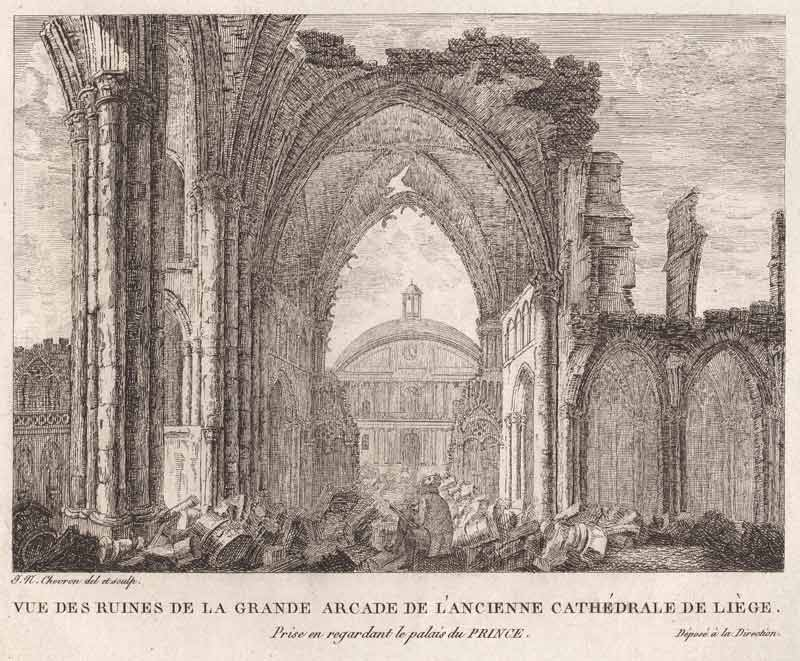

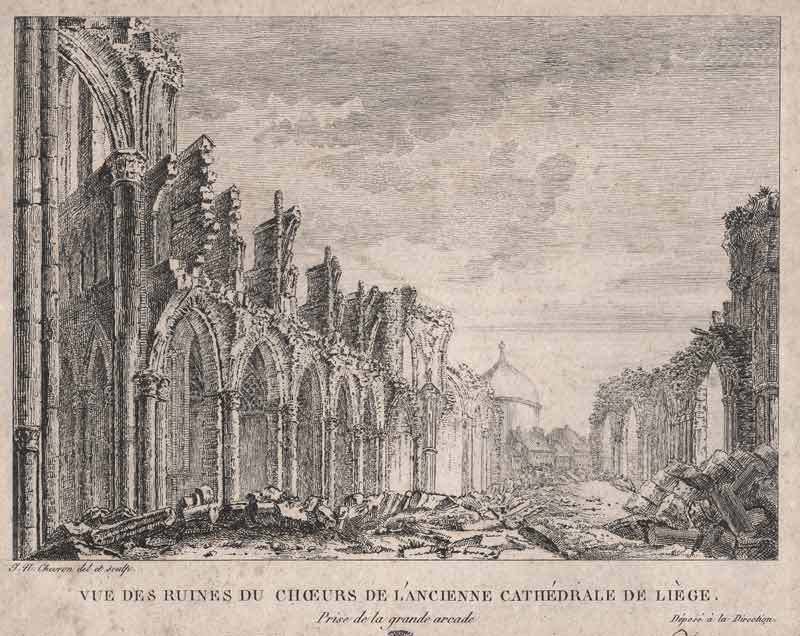
