= Anstrud of Champagne =

Medieval Frankish woman

Anstrud
- Other names: Anstrude; Anstrudis; Adaltrud; Adaltrudis
- Spouses: Berchar; Drogo of Champagne
- Children: Arnulf of Champagne; Hugh of Rouen (died 730); Gottfried; Pippin
- Parents: Waratto (father); Ansflede (mother)
- Family: Pippinid (married into)

Anstrud (also spelled Adaltrud, Anstrude, Anstrudis or Adaltrude) was a medieval Frankish noblewoman of the late Merovingian/early Carolingian period. Anstrud was the daughter of Waratto, Mayor of the Palace of Neustria and Burgundy, and Ansflede.

Anstrud first married Berchar, the successor to her father Waratto. Unlike her father, her first husband did not keep the peace with Pepin of Heristal. In 687, Pepin defeated him and Theuderic III at Tertry in the Vermandois. Berthar and Theuderic III withdrew themselves to Paris. Pepin followed them and eventually forced a peace treaty with the condition that Berthar leave his office. In the ensuing quarrels, Anstrud's mother killed Berchar.

After Berchar's death in the early 680s, Ansflede negotiated with Pippin and they arranged for the marriage of Pippin's young son, Drogo of Champagne, to Anstrud. The marriage took place towards the end of the decade or in the early 690s and resulted in the Pippinid family gaining more power in the region. Shortly after their marriage, Pippin made his son the Duke of Champagne.

Drogo and Anstrud had four sons:

- Arnulf of Champagne who succeeded his father as Duke of Champagne in 707.
- Hugh of Rouen (died 730), Archbishop of Rouen
- Gottfrid
- Pippin
