= Battle of Tertry =

687 battle

Coordinates: 49°51′47″N 3°58′10″E

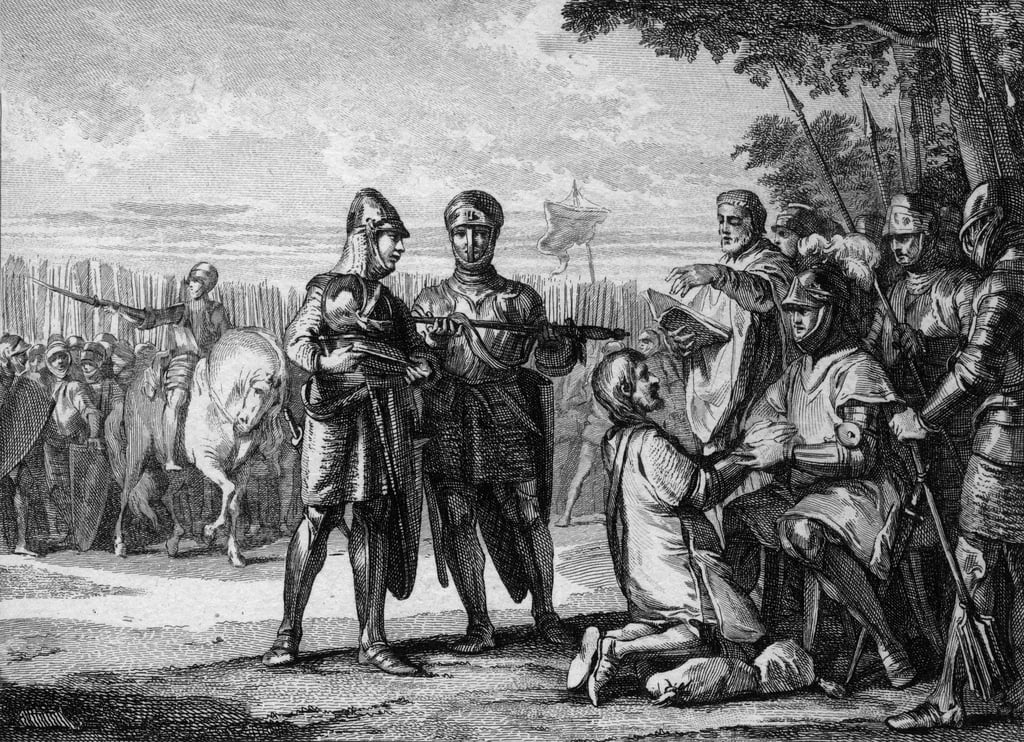
- Pepin of Herstal after the battle of Tertry (1790 illustration by J. M. Moreau, Figures de l'histoire de France)
Date	687
Location	Tertry, Somme
Result	Austrasian victory

Belligerents
Austrasia	Neustria and Burgundy

Commanders and leaders
Pepin of Herstal	Berchar

The Battle of Tertry was an important engagement in Merovingian Gaul between the forces of Austrasia under Pepin II on one side and those of Neustria and Burgundy on the other. It took place in 687 at Tertry, Somme, and the battle is presented as an heroic account in the Annales mettenses priores. After achieving victory on the battlefield at Tertry, the Austrasians dictated the political future of the Neustrians.

== Causes and results ==
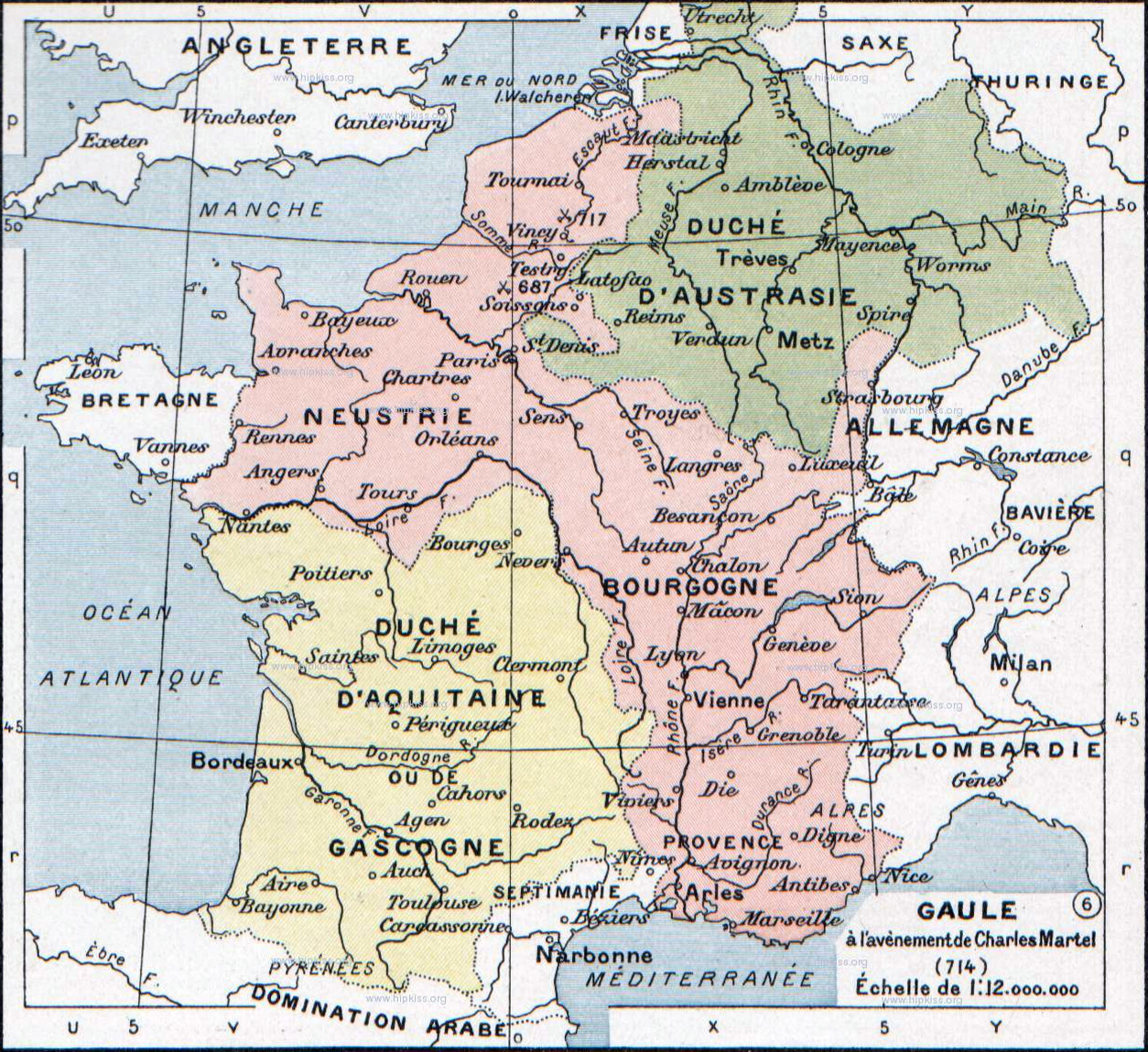
Map of Francia after the death of Pepin of Heristal in 714 (Austrasia shown in green)

The powerful Austrasian mayor of the palace, Pepin II (Pepin of Herstal) had concluded peace with his Neustrian counterpart, Waratton, in 680/681, which included the transfer of hostages to ensure peace. However, Waratton's successors had renewed the conflict between Austrasia and Neustria. Theuderic III—born and raised in Neustria and a Neustrian at heart—and the nobles of Neustria and Burgundy, under their mayor, Berchar, invaded Austrasia territory. Berchar and Theuderic were routed at Tertry by Pepin in 687 and the Austrasians held the field. Historian Michael Frassetto avows that the war during which the battle of Tertry occurred, was essentially the result of a long-standing feud between Austrasian and Neustrian leaders and the civil strife within Neustria itself. According to the text of the Annales mettenses priores—likely written at the Chelles monastery—Pepin II had led the Austrasians to a magnificent victory during the battle of Tertry. Thereby, the Austrasian Pepin extended his family's "control and influence over Neustria".

Their supremacy vindicated on a battlefield, the victors forced Berchar out of office and Pepin appointed Nordebert to act on his behalf in Neustria. The king was forced to recognise Pepin's mayorship over Austrasia, Neustria and Burgundy. Pepin subsequently had his son Drogo betrothed to Anstrudis, the widow of Berchar, who was also the daughter of Waratto so as to secure a kin network. Instead of otherwise alienating the Neustrians, Pepin merged the Neustrian Sippe into his own, becoming "part of the foundation of Arnulfing power."

Eclipsing the Neustrian Mayors, Pepin's victory brought about the effective end of the old seat of Merovingian power, enabling the Arnulfing Mayors to control Neustrian political developments. According to historian Rosamond McKitterick, the Battle of Tertry constitutes one of the decisive moments for the Carolingian house and its history. Despite the importance of Tertry in strengthening Pepin's position, it was another two generations before Pepin the Short claimed the kingship of the Franks.

== Legacy ==
The repercussions of the battle were the reduction of royal authority for Neustria; the supremacy of Austrasia over the rest of the realm, characterised by later conquests to the east and the Aachen-centred Carolingian Empire; the undisputed right to rule of the Arnulfing clan, Pepin even taking the title of dux et princeps Francorum or more recognizable to modern readers as "ruler of all of Francia". Pepin spent the remainder of the seventh century and the early years of the eighth-century reestablishing Frankish supremacy in Germany, during which time he forced the Frisians, Saxons, Alemanni, Suebians, Thuringians, and Bavari peoples to acknowledge their subordination to the Franks.

From the battle of Tertry forward, a mayor from Pepin's clan remained the senior figure within Francia. Under Pepin's heir—his illegitimate son Charles Martel—the Franks achieved their most important victory in checking the Muslim advance into central Europe. According to late historian J.M. Wallace-Hadrill, Martel's rule delineates the beginning of Carolingian power.

== Bibliography ==
- Bachrach, Bernard (2013). Charlemagne's Early Campaigns (768–777): A Diplomatic and Military Analysis. Boston; Leiden: Brill Publishers. ISBN 978-9-00424-477-1.
- Costambeys, Marios; Innes, Matthew; Maclean, Simon (2012). The Carolingian World. Cambridge and New York: Cambridge University Press. ISBN 978-0-52156-366-6.
- Frassetto, Michael (2003). Encyclopedia of Barbarian Europe: Society in Transformation. Santa Barbara, CA: ABC-CLIO. ISBN 978-1-57607-263-9.
- Frassetto, Michael (2013). The Early Medieval World: From the Fall of Rome to the Time of Charlemagne. Vol. 1. (A–K). Santa Barbara, CA: ABC-CLIO. OCLC 931447923.
- Geary, Patrick J. (1988). Before France and Germany: The Creation & Transformation of the Merovingian World. Oxford and New York: Oxford University Press. ISBN 978-0-19504-458-4.
- Heather, Peter (2022). Christendom: The Triumph of a Religion, AD 300–1300. New York: Knopf. ISBN 978-0-45149-430-6.
- James, Edward (1995). "The Northern World in the Dark Ages, 400–900". In George Holmes (ed.). The Oxford History of Medieval Europe. New York: Oxford University Press. ISBN 978-0-19280-133-3.
- McKitterick, Rosamond (1983). The Frankish Kingdoms under the Carolingians, 751–987. London: Longman. ISBN 0-582-49005-7.
- McKitterick, Rosamond (2008). Charlemagne: The Formation of a European Identity. New York: Cambridge University Press. ISBN 978-0-521-71645-1.
- Riché, Pierre (1993). The Carolingians: A Family Who Forged Europe. Translated by Michael Idomir Allen. Philadelphia: University of Pennsylvania Press. ISBN 978-0-81221-342-3.
- Smith-Clare, Israel (1897). Mediæval History. Vol. IV. New York: R. S. Peale & J. A. Hill.
- Wallace-Hadrill, J. M. (2004). The Barbarian West, 400–1000. Malden, MA: Wiley-Blackwell. ISBN 978-0-63120-292-9.
- Wickham, Chris (2016). Medieval Europe. New Haven and London: Yale University Press. ISBN 978-0-30020-834-4.
- Wood, Ian (1994). The Merovingian Kingdoms, 450–751. London and New York: Longman. ISBN 0-582-49372-2.
