= Battle of Haspres =

The Battle of Haspres could refer to:

- Battle of Haspres (1793) - A French loss to Austrian forces
- Battle of Haspres (1914) - Part of the Great Retreat of French forces at the start of the First World War
