= Acharius =

Acharius may refer to:

- Acarius, a 6th-century bishop in Gaul
- Erik Acharius, an 18th-century lichenologist
  - The Acharius Medal, named in his honor
