= Nordebert =

Norbert (or Nordebert) (died 697) was the duke of Burgundy and count of Paris in the last quarter of the seventh century. He was a faithful follower of Pepin of Heristal, who put him in charge of Neustria and Burgundy (as a sort of regent) after the Battle of Tertry in 687. Pepin's sons were given the mayoralties of these realms in 695 (or thereabouts). Norbert died in 697 and Burgundy passed to Drogo, son of Pepin and mayor of Burgundy.

| Preceded by Berchar | Mayor of the Palace of Neustria; 687–695 | Succeeded by Grimoald the Younger |

== Sources ==
- Dictionnaire de Biographie Française. Roman d'Amat and R. Limousin-Lamothe (ed). Paris, 1967.
