= Haspres Abbey =

Priory in Haspres, France

Haspres Abbey was a Benedictine monastery in the village of Haspres now in north eastern France that was dissolved in the French Revolution.

The abbey was founded in the seventh century. In 841 it became dependent on Jumièges Abbey, after the monks fled from their home in what would later become Normandy to escape the Vikings. They bought the relics of Saint Hugh of Rouen and Saint Acarius which transformed it into an important pilgrimage center. These two saints remain the patron saints of the village.

The Jumiege monks were welcomed back to their old home in the Normandy by William Longsword the second duke and started the rebuilding.

It was transferred to the Abbey of Saint-Vaast in Arras led by Richard of Verdun in 1024. In 1109 an unsuccessful attempt was made to secede from Saint-Vaast by Benedictine monks opposed to stricter Cluniac reforms. A charter granted in 1176 by Baldwin V, Count of Hainaut conferred judicial authority upon the provost of the abbey. Until the French Revolution, the abbey exercised lordship over Haspres. The village became part of the Spanish Netherlands and was later ceded to French under in the Treaties of Nijmegen in 1678.

During the French Revolution the substantial church property in the village was nationalised with the abbey becoming a farm and the monks expelled. The parish priest was guillotined during the Reign of Terror. The church was mostly destroyed and was rebuilt in 1809.

== Sources ==
- Douglas, David C. (1964). William the Conqueror: The Norman Impact Upon England. Berkeley, California: University of California Press. OCLC 399137.
