= Thiérache =

Geographic region in Belgium and France

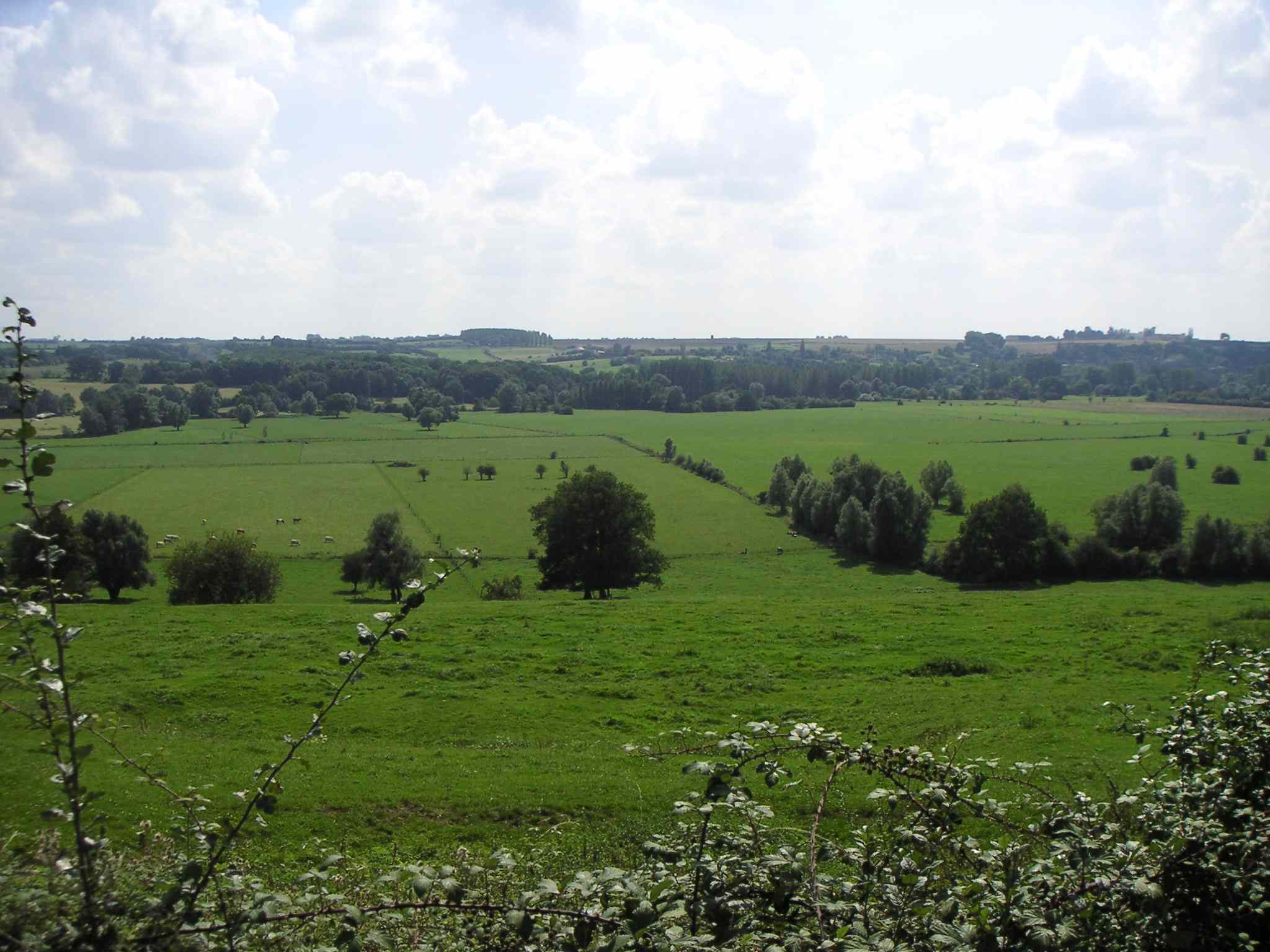
View of the Oise river valley near Marly-Gomont in French Thiérache

The Thiérache (French pronunciation: [tjeʁaʃ]; Picard: Quiérache) is a natural region in France and Belgium united by similar geography including rolling hilly terrain, forests and grassland, hedges, and scattered settlements. It is also known for its regional architecture of traditional stone or brick buildings with slate roofs.

Located in the north-east of the French Aisne department, it also spills over into parts of the Nord and Ardennes departments and the Belgian provinces of Hainaut and Namur. It loosely follows the Oise river and some of its tributaries such as the Serre and Thon. Its overall location is the western foothills of the Ardennes massif. Historically, its capital was Guise, even though its largest settlement is now Fourmies.

It is bisected by the route nationale 2 between Paris and Brussels, whilst another important local route is the route nationale 43 between Cambrai and Charleville-Mézières.

Historically, the region was a pivotal centre of mulquinerie (linen weaving). It is also known for its distinctive fortified historic village churches such as those at Plomion, Bancigny, Burelles and Beaurain.
