= Haspres =

- Commune
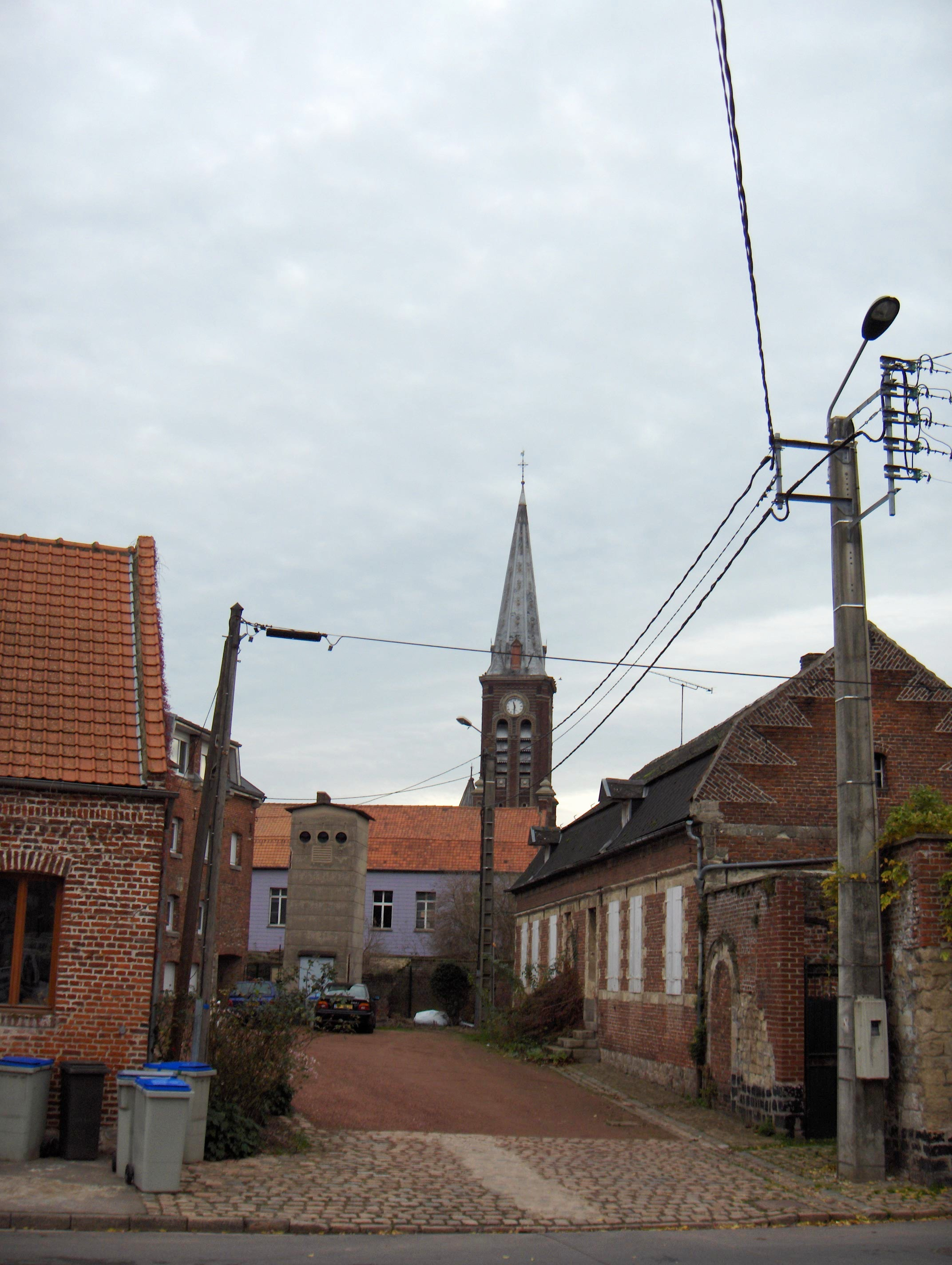
- A view within Haspres

- Coat of arms
- Location of Haspres
- Location within France Location within Hauts-de-France
- Coordinates: 50°15′29″N 3°25′01″E
- Country: France
- Region: Hauts-de-France
- Department: Nord
- Arrondissement: Valenciennes
- Canton: Aulnoy-lez-Valenciennes
- Intercommunality: CA Porte du Hainaut

Government
  - Mayor (2020–2026): Jean-François Delattre
- Area^{1}: 12.2 km^{2} (4.7 sq mi)
- Elevation: 41 m (135 ft)
- Highest elevation: 80 m (260 ft)
- Lowest elevation: 36 m (118 ft)
- Population (2023): 2,626
  - Density: 215/km^{2} (557/sq mi)
- Time zone: UTC+01:00 (CET)
  - Summer (DST): UTC+02:00 (CEST)
- INSEE/Postal code: 59285 /59198
- ^{1} French Land Register data, which excludes lakes, ponds, glaciers > 1 km^{2} (0.386 sq mi or 247 acres) and river estuaries.

Haspres (French pronunciation: [aspʁ]) is a commune in the Nord department in northern France.

== Population ==
Historical population
Year	Pop.	±% p.a.
1968	2,941	—
1975	2,889	−0.25%
1982	2,700	−0.96%
1990	2,715	+0.07%
1999	2,753	+0.15%
2007	2,670	−0.38%
2012	2,788	+0.87%
2017	2,739	−0.35%
2023	2,626	−0.70%
Source: INSEE

== Heraldry ==
Arms of Haspres	The arms of Haspres are blazoned : Azure, semy de lys Or dimidiated with Vert, a fess argent. (Ghissignies and Haspres use the same arms.)

== History ==
In 57 BC, Julius Caesar defeated the Nervii in the Haspres area during the Battle of the Sabis.

During the Gallo-Roman period, the village lay on the road linking Bavay (Bagacum) and Amiens (Samarobriva).

The Franks invaded the region from the 3rd century, and again during the 5th century.

Around the eighth century Haspres Abbey was founded, and in 841 it hosted refugees from Jumièges Abbey who were fleeing the Vikings bringing the relics of Saint Hugh of Rouen and Saint Acarius who remain the patron saints of the village church.

A charter granted in 1176 by Baldwin V, Count of Hainaut conferred feudal authority upon the provost of the abbey. The village passed to Philip the Good in 1433, and became part of the Spanish Netherlands in 1502 when his great-grandson Philip I became King of Castile. Situated on the southern border with France, the village was fortified, with some traces of these defences surviving today. During the two centuries of Spanish rule, the region was repeatedly affected by warfare as Francis I of France, Henry II of France, Louis XIII and Louis XIV successively attempted to recover the County of Hainaut. Haspres finally became French under the terms of the Treaties of Nijmegen in 1678.

During the French Revolution the abbey was dissolved and the parish priest was guillotined during the Reign of Terror. In 1793, the French lost the Battle of Haspres against Austrian forces.

After the First French Empire, Russian troops occupied Haspres for two years. The village experienced industrial growth during the 19th century through its textile spinning mills, which employed a large proportion of the local population. The city was a pivotal center of mulquinerie.

During the First World War, Haspres was occupied by German forces on the morning of 25 August 1914. Thirty-five Territorial soldiers from Mayenne were killed during the fighting. The inhabitants endured four years of curfews and deprivation. The village was recaptured by British forces on 20 October 1918, at the cost of several hundred lives and the destruction of dozens of houses.

During the Second World War, following the Phoney War, the village was again occupied on 20 May 1940 after a fierce tank battle. Haspres remained under German occupation until 2 September 1944, when it was liberated by an American armoured division.

Military cemeteries and war memorials

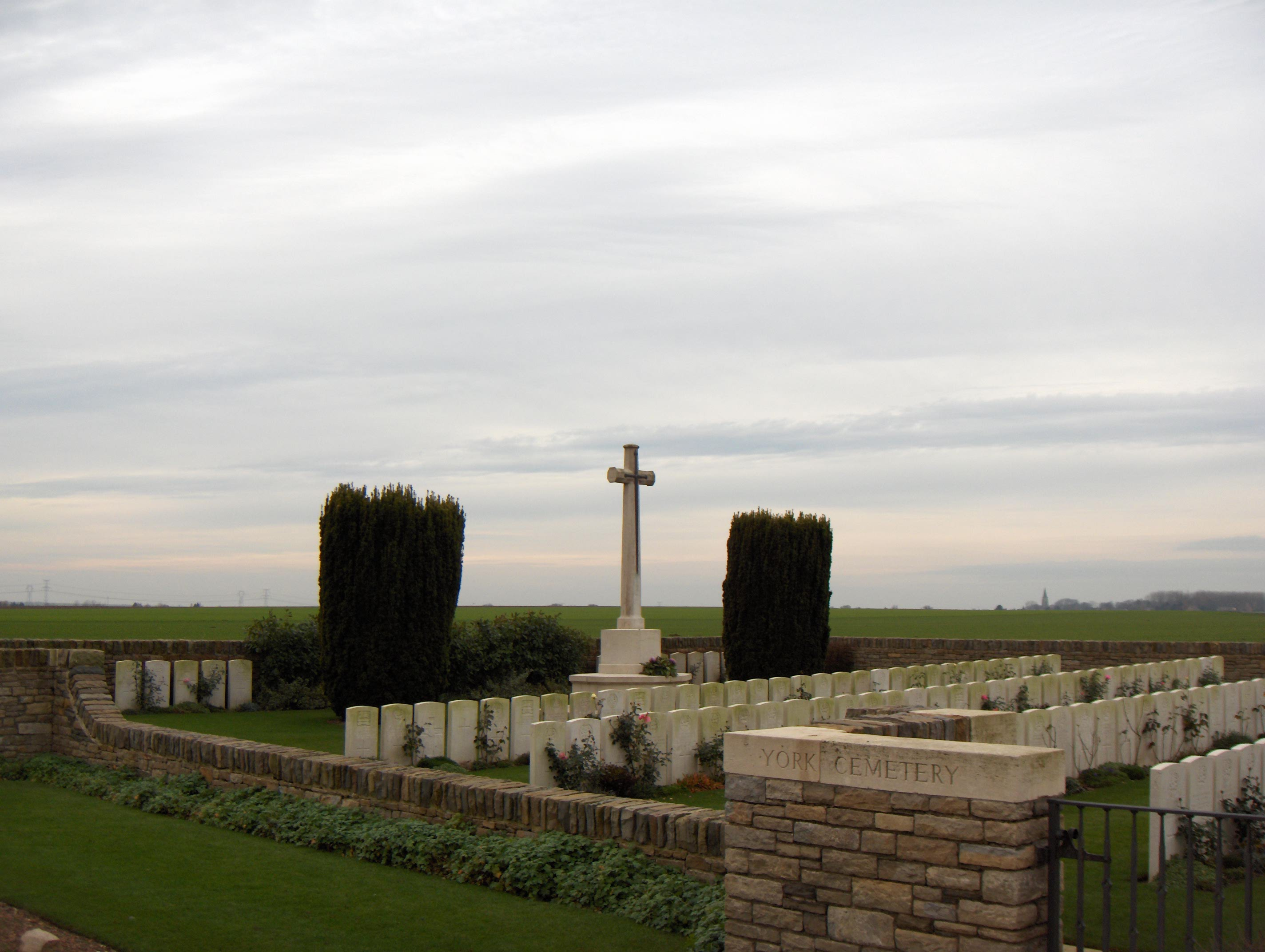
York Cemetery, Haspres, a British military cemetery from the First World War.

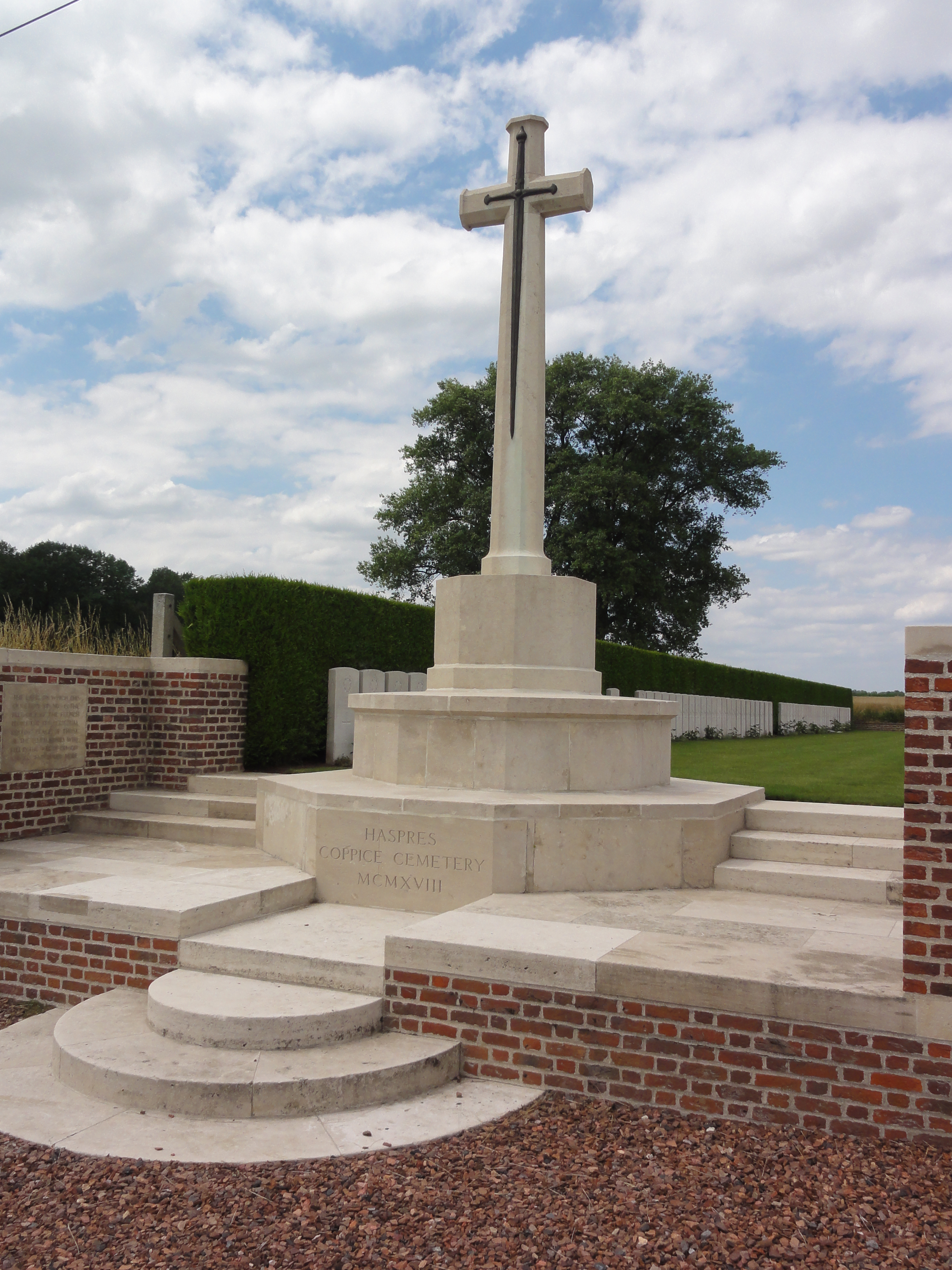
Haspres Coppice Cemetery, a British military cemetery from the First World War.

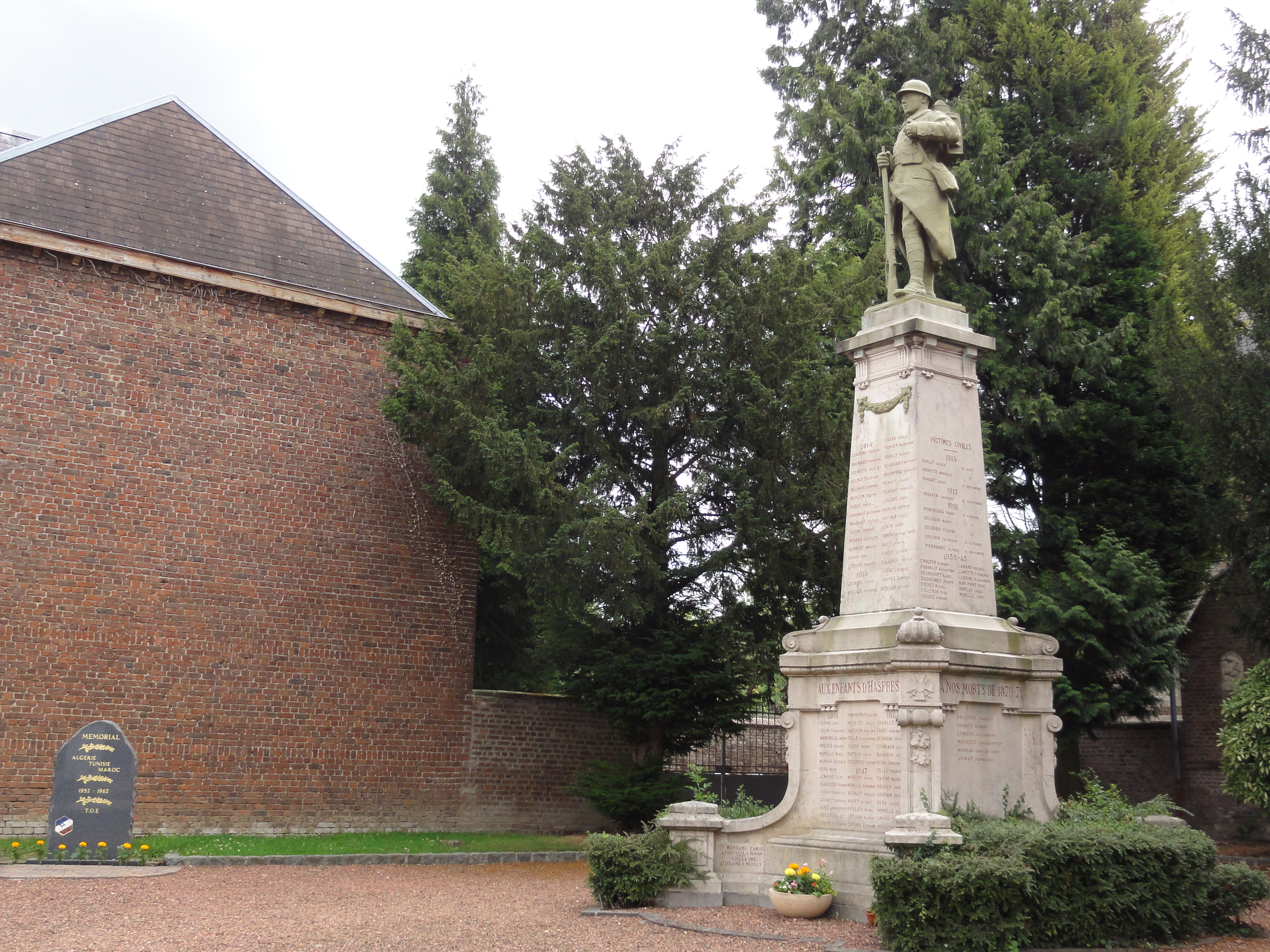
War memorials beside the town hall.

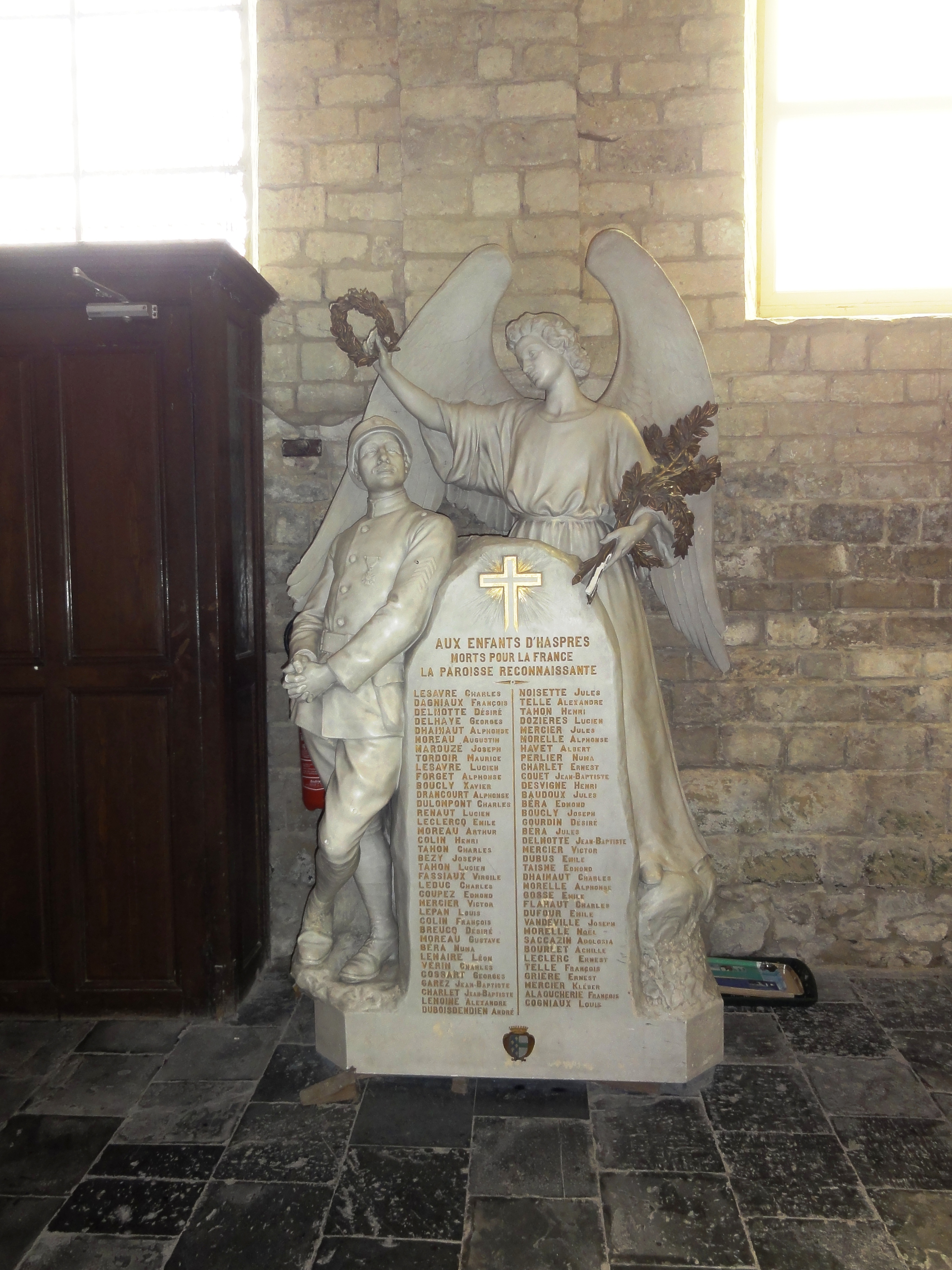
War memorial inside the church.

Haspres subsequently experienced the closure of its textile mills, followed by the decline of the mining and steel industries, and its population has remained largely stable since the 1980s.

== See also ==
- Communes of the Nord department
