= Mulquinerie =

Art of weaving and trading fine fabrics composed exclusively of linen

Mulquiniers
- Le Tisserand (The Weaver), 1888, by Paul Sérusier (1864–1927); oil on canvas, 72 × 58 cm, Musée d'Art et d'Archéologie, Senlis, France.
- Years active: 17th–20th centuries
- Location: Northern France

Mulquinerie is a landmark of French sartorial heritage and high craftsmanship, and is the art of weaving and trading fine fabrics composed exclusively of linen: whether plain flax cloth, 'linon' or batiste. A 'mulquinier' was the artisan textile designer and weaver as well as the merchant of canvases. The mulquiniers were not only a subcategorization of the tisserand(e) artists (hand loom weavers; French pronunciation: [tisʀɑ̃]) but were also the traders of their own craft. This activity was predominantly developed within villages as a substantial rural proto-industry, hence mulquiniers working on métiers à tisser in their home' basement while breathing from "bahottes" or "blocures" to obtain the most propitious humidity levels.

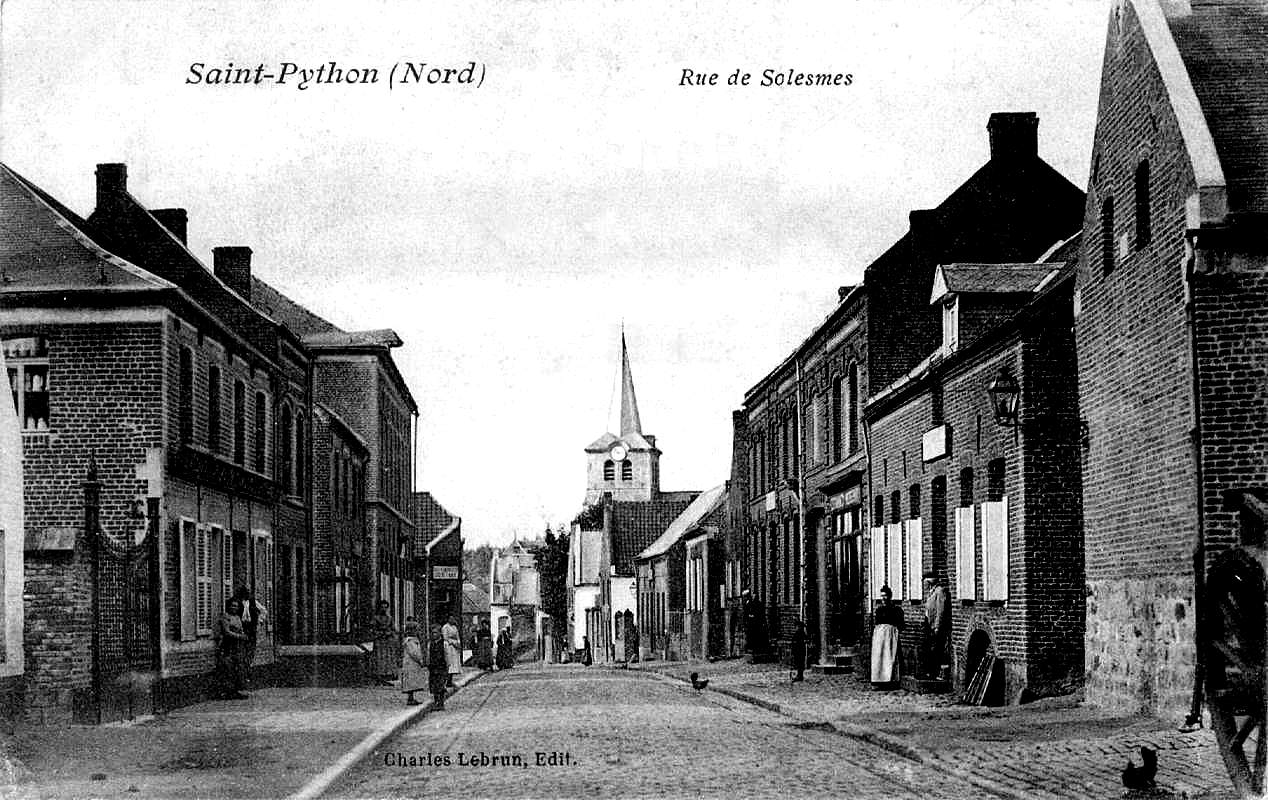
Rue de Solesmes in Saint-Python (1905) in the foreground on the right an estaminet with a "blocure".

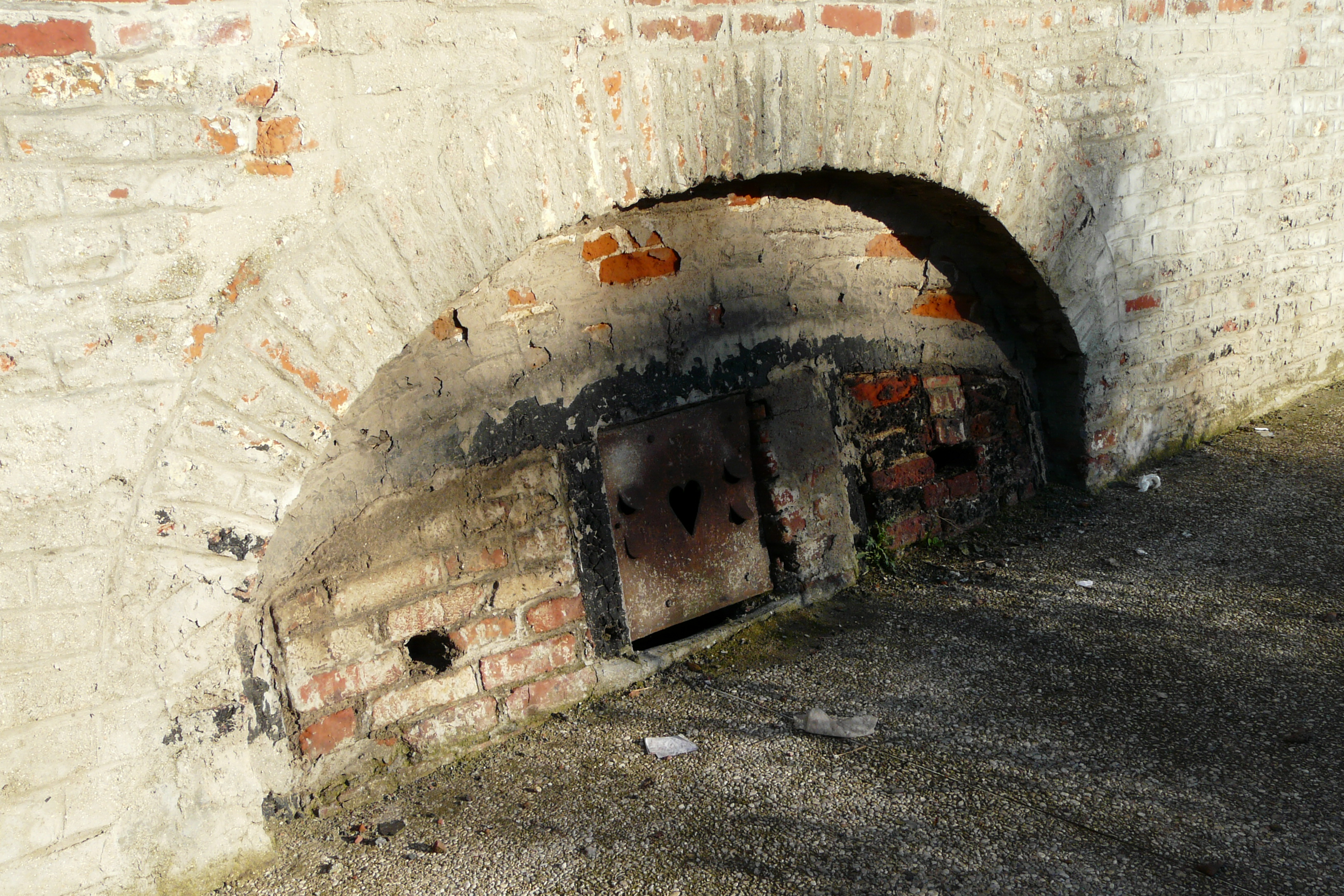
A "bahotte / blocure" (basement window giving light and air to the mulquiniers in Cambrésis, 19th C).

== Origins and etymology ==
Mulquinerie originated in the 17th and 18th centuries from metropolitan France’s Northern Departments now constituting the Hauts-de-France region (French pronunciation: [o d(ə) fʁɑ̃s], translating to "Upper France" in English; Picard: Heuts-d'Franche), following the territorial reform of French Regions (2014) from a merger of Nord-Pas-de-Calais and Picardy. The activity was ubiquitous in the towns of the former Nord-Pas de Calais Mining Basin, the Cambrésis sub-province or the Thiérache including Saint-Vaast-en-Cambrésis, Saint-Hilaire-lez-Cambrai, Haspres, Saint-Quentin or Neuvilly. This also included Caudry, the medieval capital city of French lace, which remains (in collaboration with Calais) the only town in France where lace is still made.

Etymologically, ‘mulquinier’ is derived from the Germanic term "mollquin" meaning 'thin canvas'. First traces of the term are encountered in the 'Charter of the mulquiniers of Valenciennes' in 1413 through the use of the term 'molekinier'. Among the oldest mulquinerie ancestries are the Lecygne and Legueil families tracing back beyond the 17th century being fabric dyers, textile artists, embroiderers, patternmakers or hand-spinners.

== Symbolism and patronage ==
The French mulquiniers' patron was Saint Veronica of Jerusalem whose feast they celebrated biennially (summer and winter) as in many pious Christian countries.

== Gallery ==
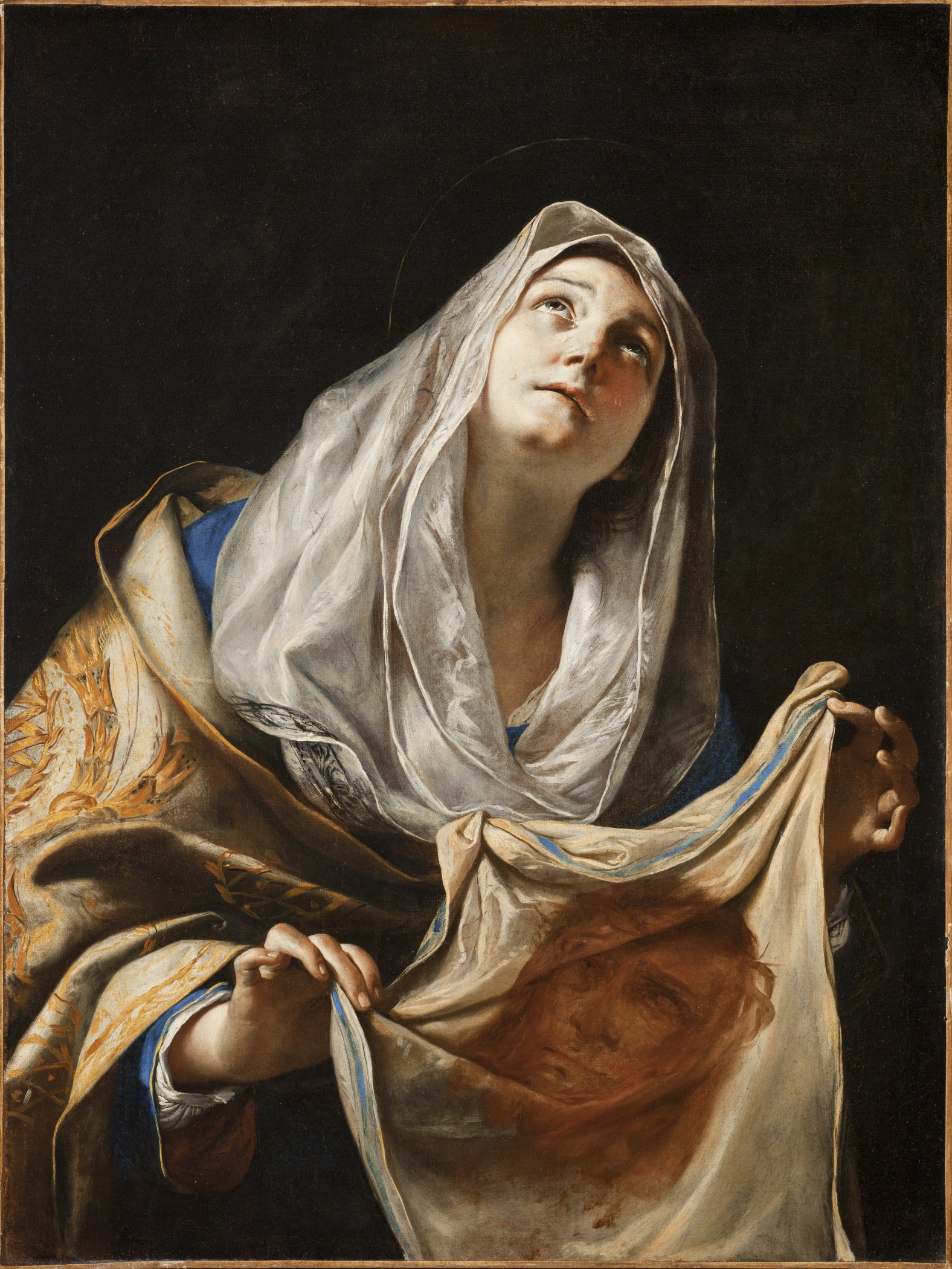

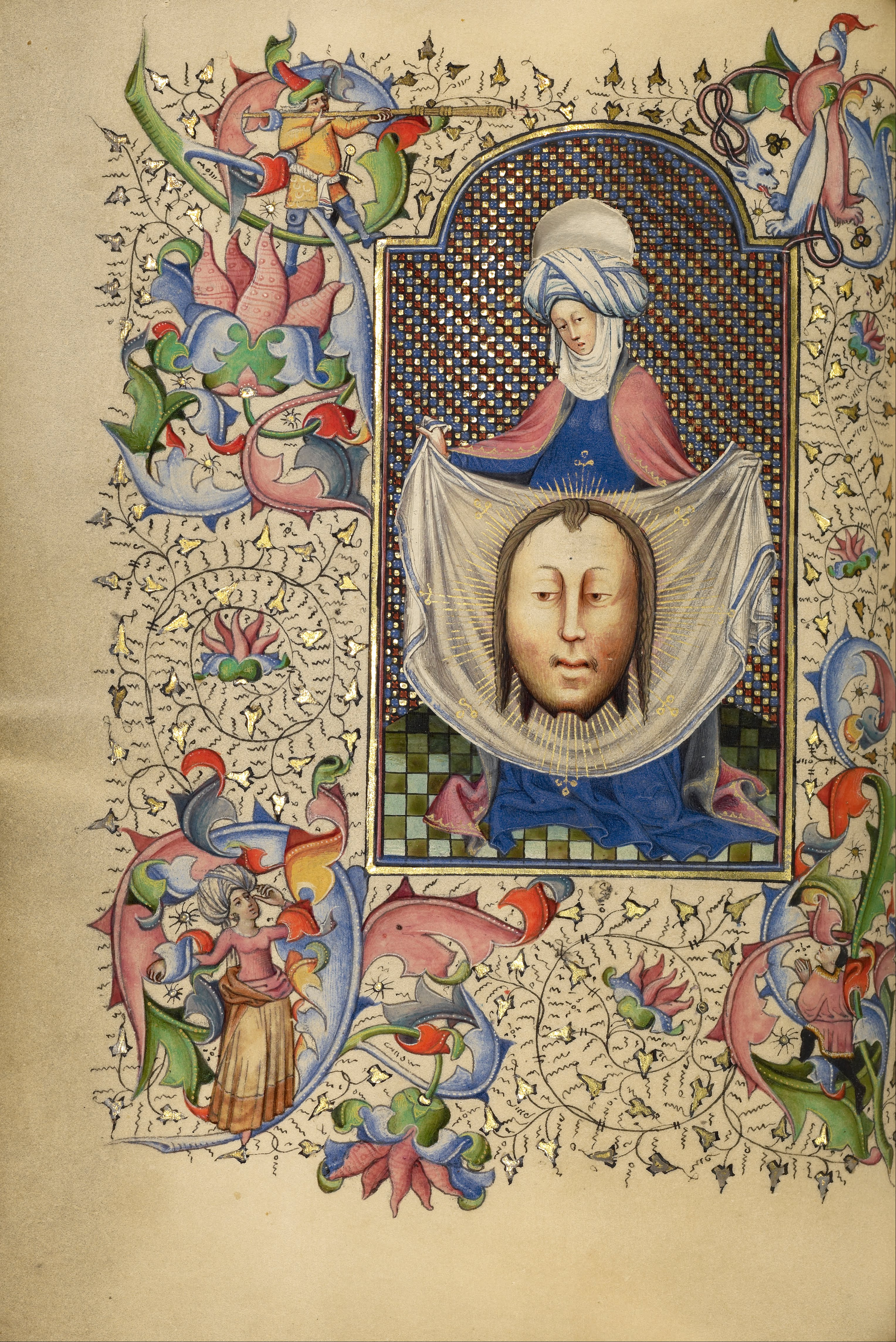

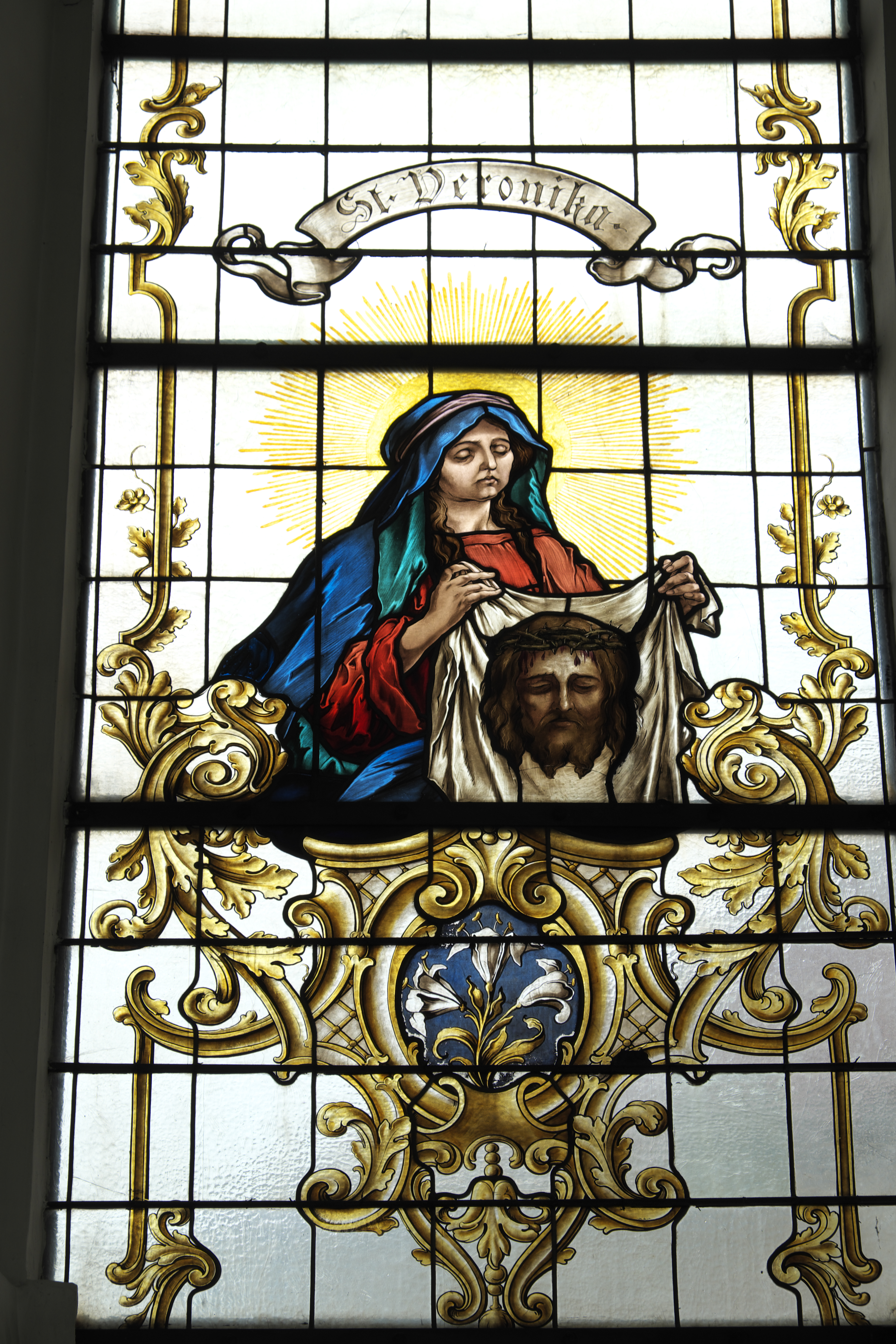

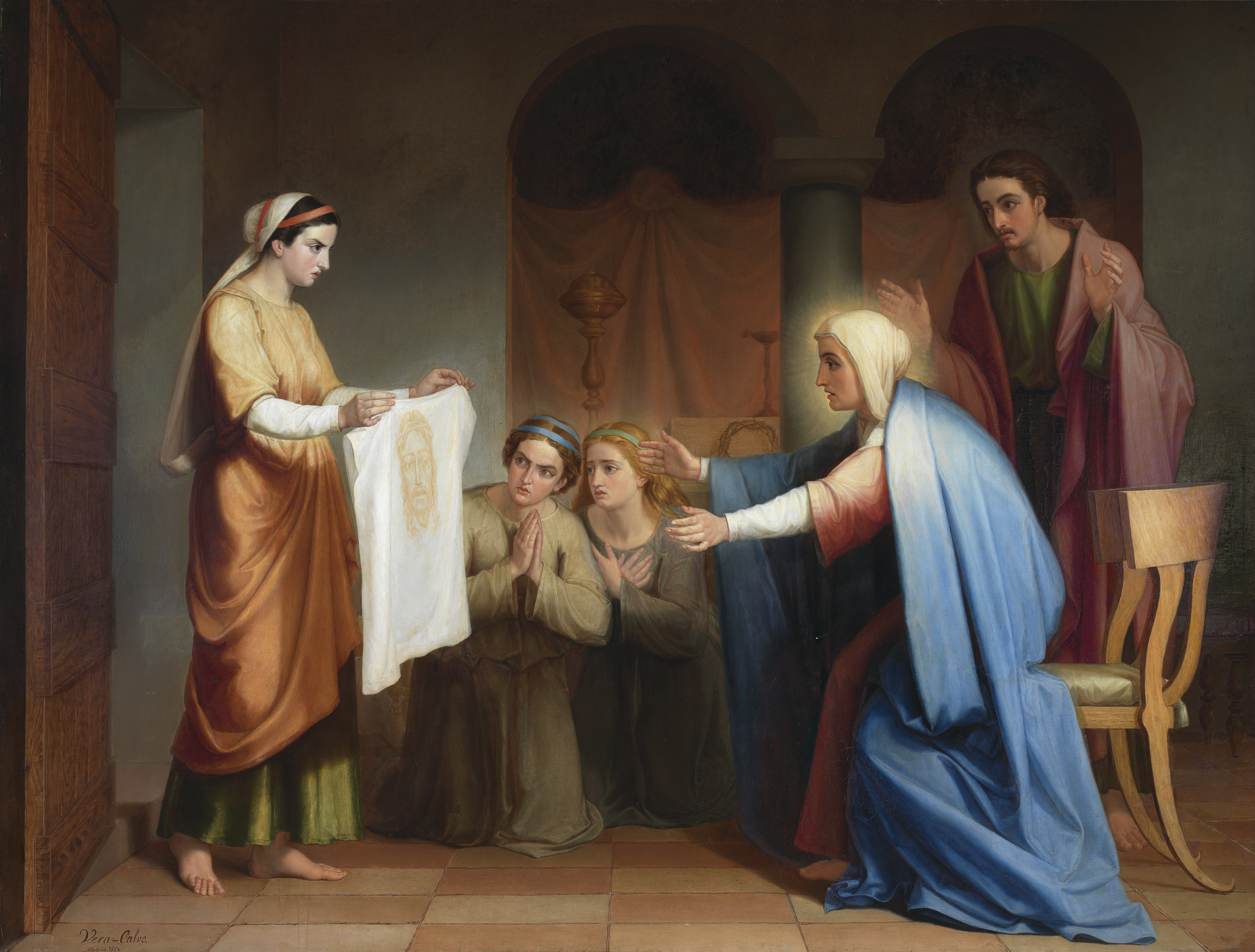

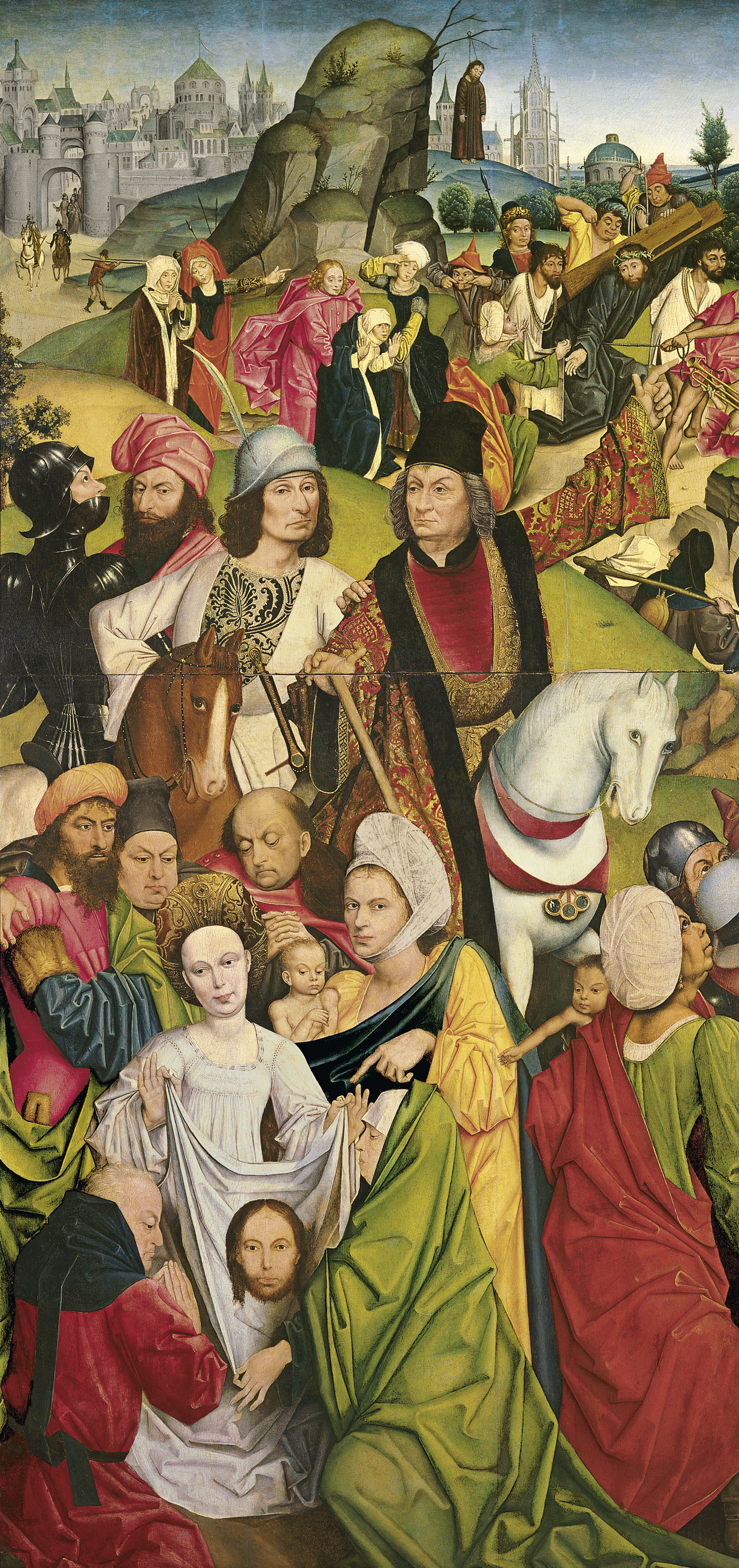

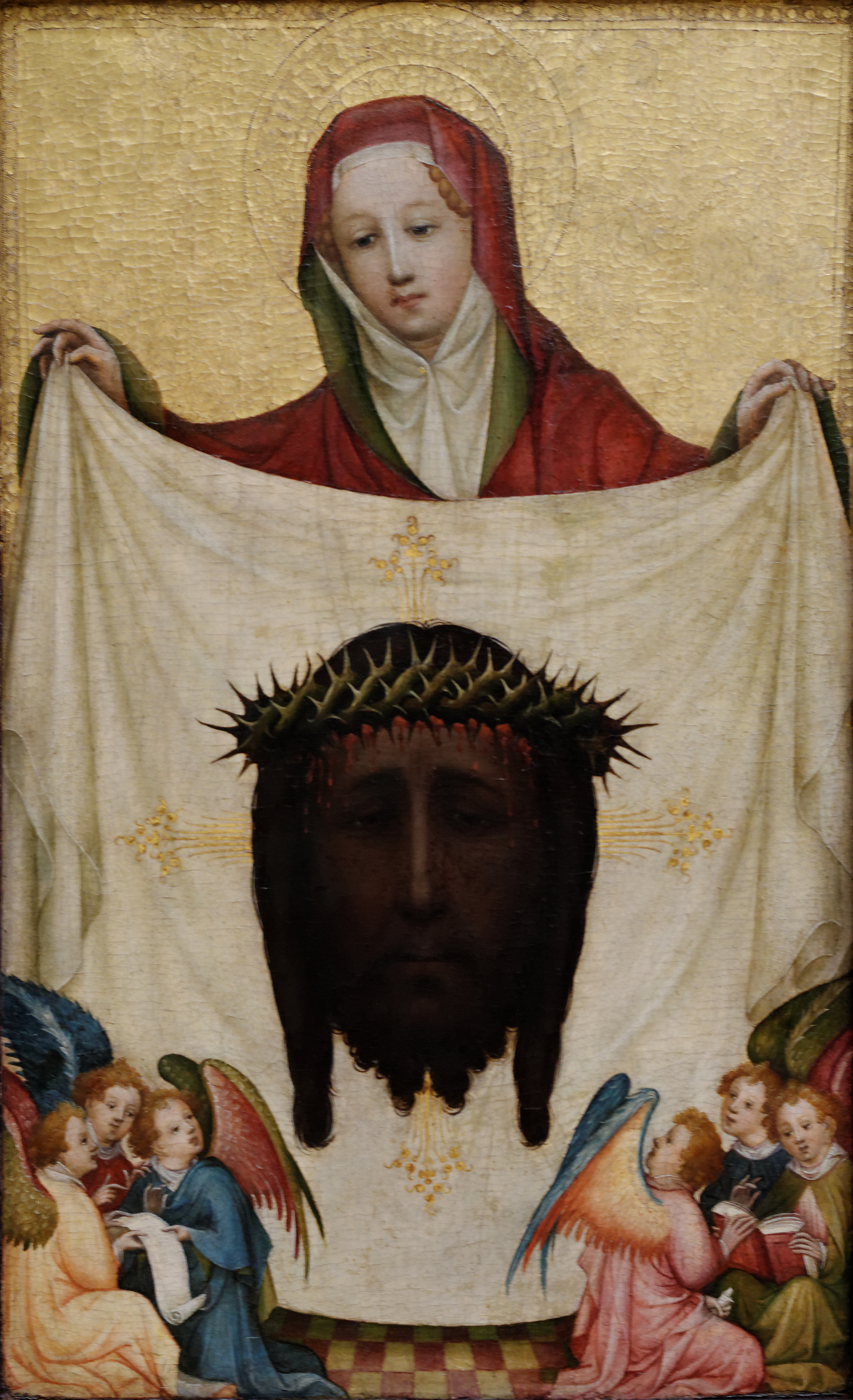

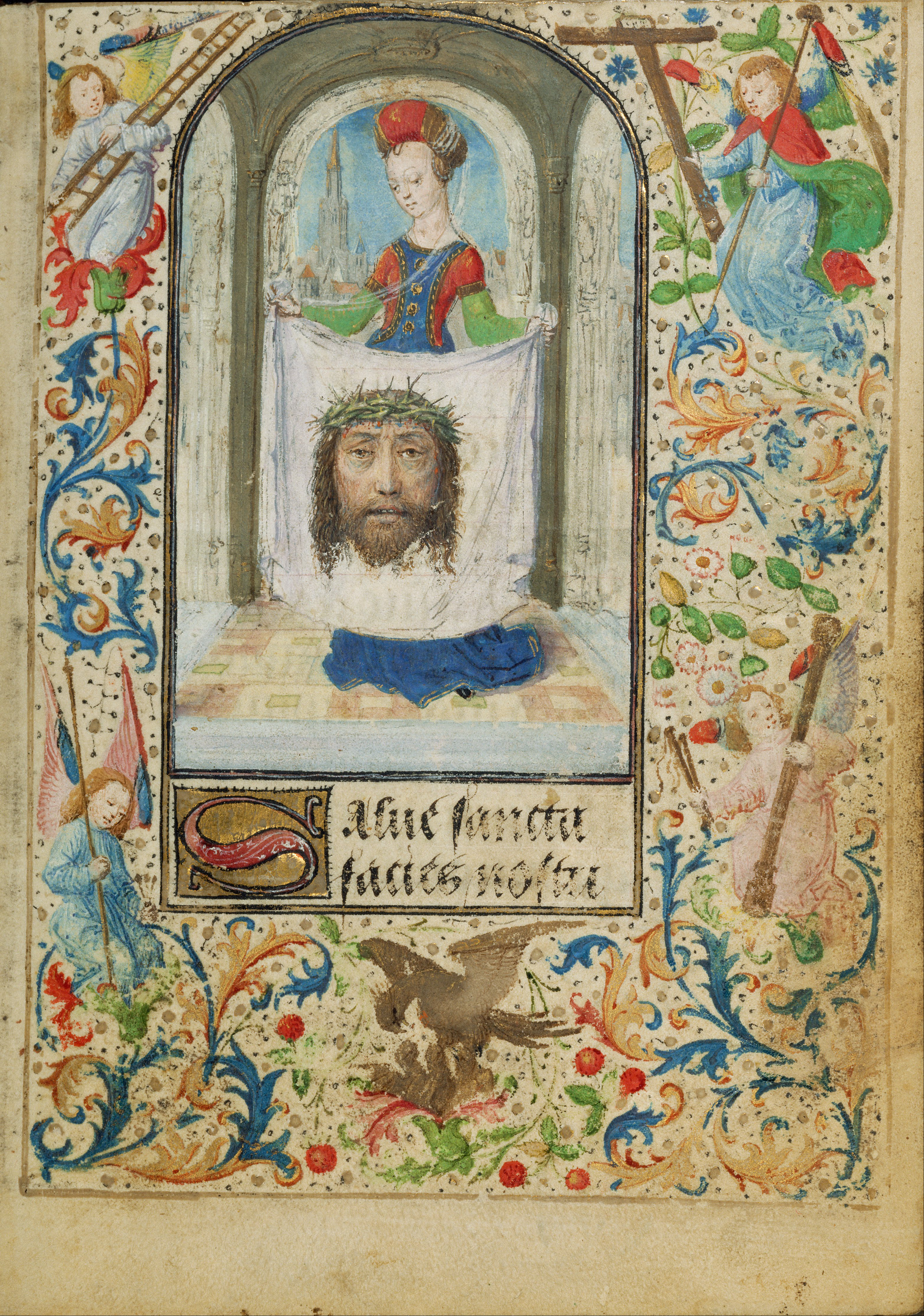

== Expertise or archival materials ==
=== Bibliography ===
- René Debrie (dir.), La Picardie, Paris, Les Éditions d'Organisation, coll. peuple et pays de France, 1981 (ISBN 2-7081-0422-5).
- Didier Terrier, "Mulquiniers et gaziers: les deux phases de la proto-industrie textile dans la région de Saint-Quentin. 1730–1850" [article], Revue du Nord, 1983.
