= Arnulf of Champagne =

Arnulf (fl. 707–723) was the oldest son of Drogo, Duke of Champagne, and succeeded his father as duke in 707. His mother was Adaltrudis and his parents were married around 690. He was named after Bishop Arnulf of Metz, his great-great-grandfather. He is the first known Arnulf in his family, the Pippinids, after the bishop.

In a charter of June 715, Arnulf, described as a dux (duke), and his brothers Hugh, Gotfrid and Pippin, granted land to the church of Saint Arnulf at Metz, in honour of their father, who was buried there. In 716, Arnulf granted an inheritance he owned at Bollendorf to the Abbey of Echternach, perhaps as an honorarium for the baptism of Arnulf's infant cousin, Pippin the Short, which took place at Easter that year. This charter may reflect a reconciliation of sorts between two branches of the Pippinid family: the elder, represented by Arnulf, eldest son of the eldest son of Pippin of Heristal and Plectrudis, and the younger, represented by his uncle, Charles Martel, Pippin's son by Alpaida and father of Pippin the Short.

The reconciliation did not last, for two years later Charles was repeating Arnulf's gift to Echternach as if he had taken control of the property in question. In 723, the Annales Nazariani record that, at Charles' command, "two sons of Drogo were bound, Arnold [Arnulf] and another who died", either Gotfrid or Pippin. The same basic, perfunctory account is found in the Annales Petaviani, Annales Laureshamenses and Annales Alamannici. Arnulf's ultimate fate is unknown.

== Sources ==
- Bouchard, Constance B. (2015). Rewriting Saints and Ancestors: Memory and Forgetting in France, 500–1200. University of Pennsylvania Press.
- Fouracre, Paul J. (2013). The Age of Charles Martel. Routledge.
- Gerberding, Richard A. (1987). The Rise of the Carolingians and the Liber Historiae Francorum. Oxford: Oxford University Press.
- Heidrich, Ingrid (1965–66). "Titular und Urkunden der arnulfingischen Hausmeier". Archiv für Diplomatik. 11/12: 17–279, at 239–40 and 251–52.
- Nelson, Janet L. (2019). King and Emperor: A New Life of Charlemagne. Penguin.
