= Drogo of Champagne =

Frankish nobleman

Drogo (c.675 – 708) was a Frankish nobleman, the eldest son of Pepin of Herstal and Plectrude. He was the duke of Champagne from the early 690s and duke of Burgundy from the death of Nordebert in 697. He was also the mayor of the palace of Burgundy from 695.

Drogo was born shortly after his parents' marriage, which probably took place in 675 or just after. In the early 680s, Pepin arranged the marriage of Drogo with Anstrudis (or Adaltrudis), the daughter of Waratto, the mayor of the palace in Neustria, and his wife Ansfledis. The marriage took place toward the end of the decade or in the early 690s. Drogo and Anstrudis had four sons: Arnulf, who succeeded him as duke of Champagne; Hugh, who entered the church and rose to become an archbishop; Gotfrid; and Pepin.

The marriage of Drogo and Anstrudis increased his father Pepin's influence in Neustria. Waratto's family properties were located mainly in the vicinity of Rouen. Drogo, however, was made duke in Champagne, a frontier region between Neustria and Austrasia. His power in Champagne was enhanced through his control of the monastery of Montier-en-Der and possibly the monastery of Hautvillers. By entrusting Drogo and his brother Grimoald with important political responsibilities in Burgundy and Neustria, respectively, Pepin identified them as his intended political heirs ahead of their half-brother Charles Martel.

The Liber Historiae Francorum, a history of the Franks written in Neustria in 727, portrays the Austrasian Drogo as sympathetic to the Neustrians because of his marital connections. He did, however, fall foul of the abbey of Saint-Denis, which sued him in the king's court in a property dispute. King Childebert III ruled in Saint-Denis's favour. Drogo also lost a lawsuit over the villa of Noisy-sur-Oise with the monastery of Tussonval in 697.

Drogo predeceased his father, dying in 707, according to the Gesta abbatum Fontanellensium, or in 708, according to most of the annals. He was buried in the church of Saint Arnulf at Metz, to which his four sons made a grant of land in his honour in June 715. The Annales Mettenses record that Grimoald succeeded Drogo in all his offices, but in fact his son Arnulf succeeded him as duke. The death of Drogo was perceived by later generations as a pivotal event in the history of the Carolingian dynasty. Several of the imperial annals written in the late eighth century begin their year-by-year accounts with 708. These include the Annales Alamannici, Annales Nazariani and Annales Laureshamenses.

== Sources ==
- Bachrach, Bernard S. (2001). Early Carolingian Warfare: Prelude to Empire. University of Pennsylvania Press.
- Bouchard, Constance B. (2015). Rewriting Saints and Ancestors: Memory and Forgetting in France, 500–1200. University of Pennsylvania Press.
- Collins, Roger (2002). "Frankish Past and Carolingian Present in the Age of Charlemagne". In Peter Godman; Jörg Jarnut; Peter Johanek (eds.). Am Vorabend der Kaiserkrönung: Das Epos "Karolus Magnus et Leo papa" und der Papstbesuch in Paderborn 799. Akademie Verlag. pp. 301–22.
- Fouracre, Paul J. (1984). "Observations on the Outgrowth of Pippinid Influence in the Regnum Francorum after the Battle of Tertry (687–715)" (PDF). Medieval Prosopography. 5: 1–31.
- Fouracre, Paul J. (2013). The Age of Charles Martel. Routledge.
- Gerberding, Richard A. (1987). The Rise of the Carolingians and the Liber Historiae Francorum. Oxford: Oxford University Press.
