= Acarius =

7th-century Frankish Christian bishop

Acarius (died 14 March 642), venerated as Saint Acarius, was a monk of Luxeuil Abbey who became Bishop of Doornik and Noyon, which today are located on either side of the Franco-Belgian border.

== Life ==
Acarius was born to a noble family of Burgundy. He entered the Abbey of Luxeuil and was a pupil of Abbot Eustace. Audomar, future bishop of Thérouanne was a classmate.

While the date of his election is not known, it is assured that he was bishop of Doornik and Noyon in 627. He was an adviser to King Clothar II. Apparently, Acarius had great influence on the spreading of Christianity in Belgic Gaul. It was Acarius that recommended to Dagobert that Audomar be appointed Bishop of Thérouanne. He was a strong supporter of the missionary Amandus, but despite his influence could not prevent King Dagobert I from banishing Amandus for chastising him. Amandus then went to Gascony. Along with Audomar and the King's counselor, Éloi, they were eventually able to persuade Dagobert to allow Amandus to return, and Acarius sent him to preach in the area of Tournai.

As bishop, Acarius was especially attentive to the poor and afflicted, whose needs he enjoyed relieving and calming their suffering. He built a number of monasteries.

== Veneration ==
Soon after his death in November 640, he was venerated as a Saint. He was succeeded as bishop by Eligius. His relics were first kept at Jumièges Abbey and then moved to Haspres Abbey to keep them away from the Vikings. He is still a patron of Haspres.

His memorial is 27 Nov. Acarius is invoked against a "cantankerous" mood. The Église Saints-Hugues-et-Achaire de Haspres

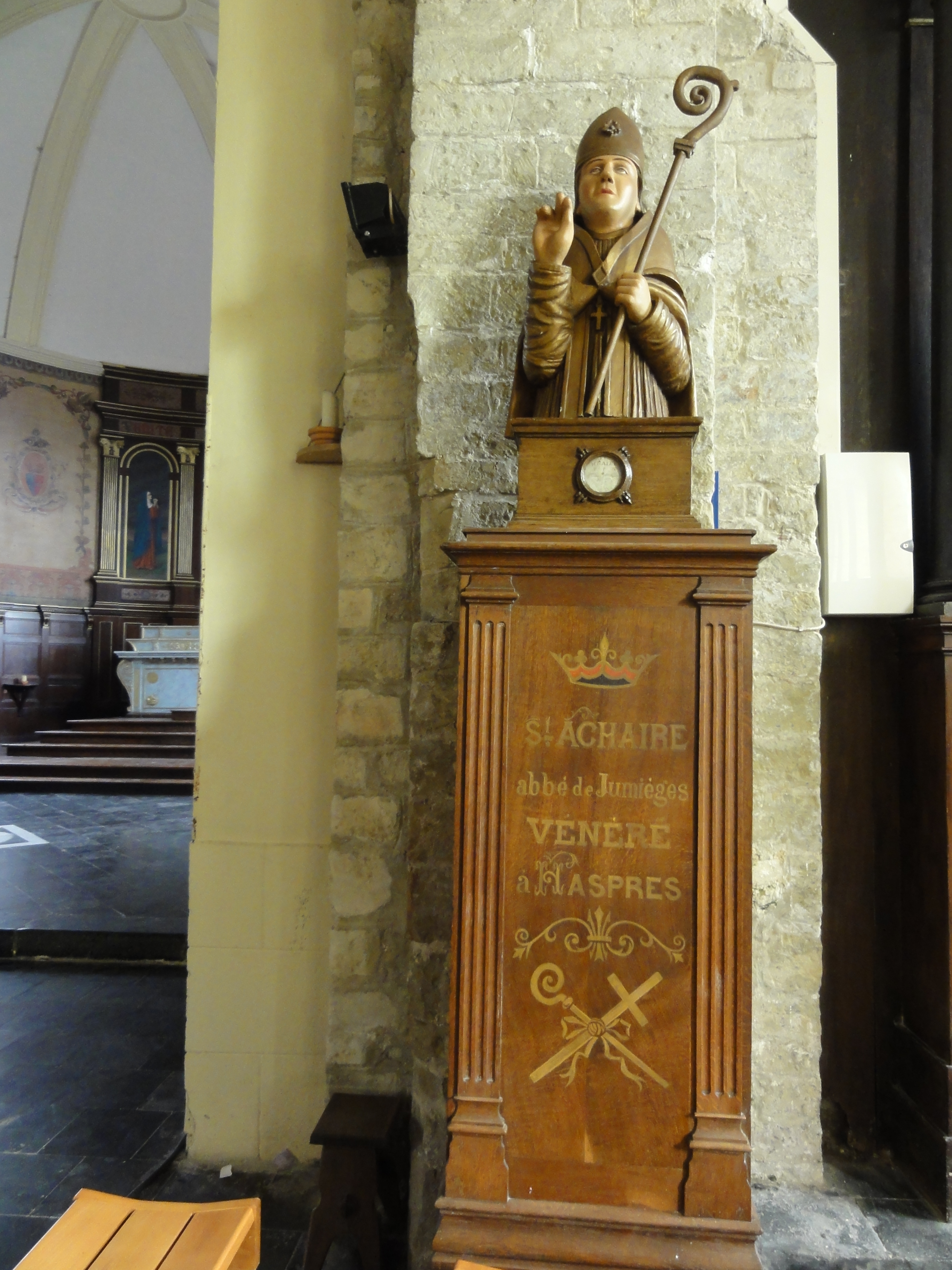
Buste of Acarius in Haspres

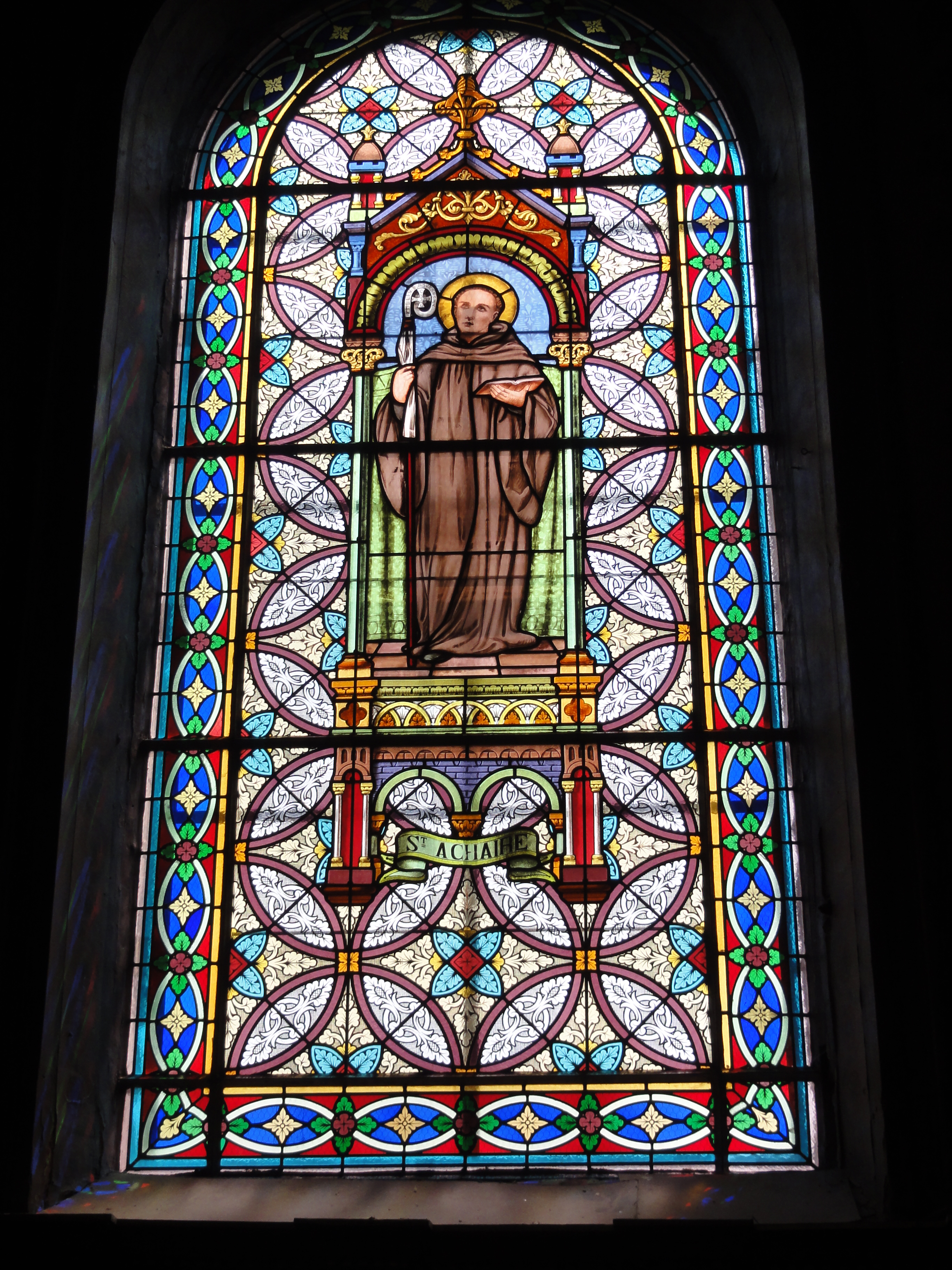
Stained glass window of Acarius in Haspres is dedicated to him.

== Sources ==
- Allgemeine Deutsche Biographie - online version at Wikisource
