= Tertry =

- Commune
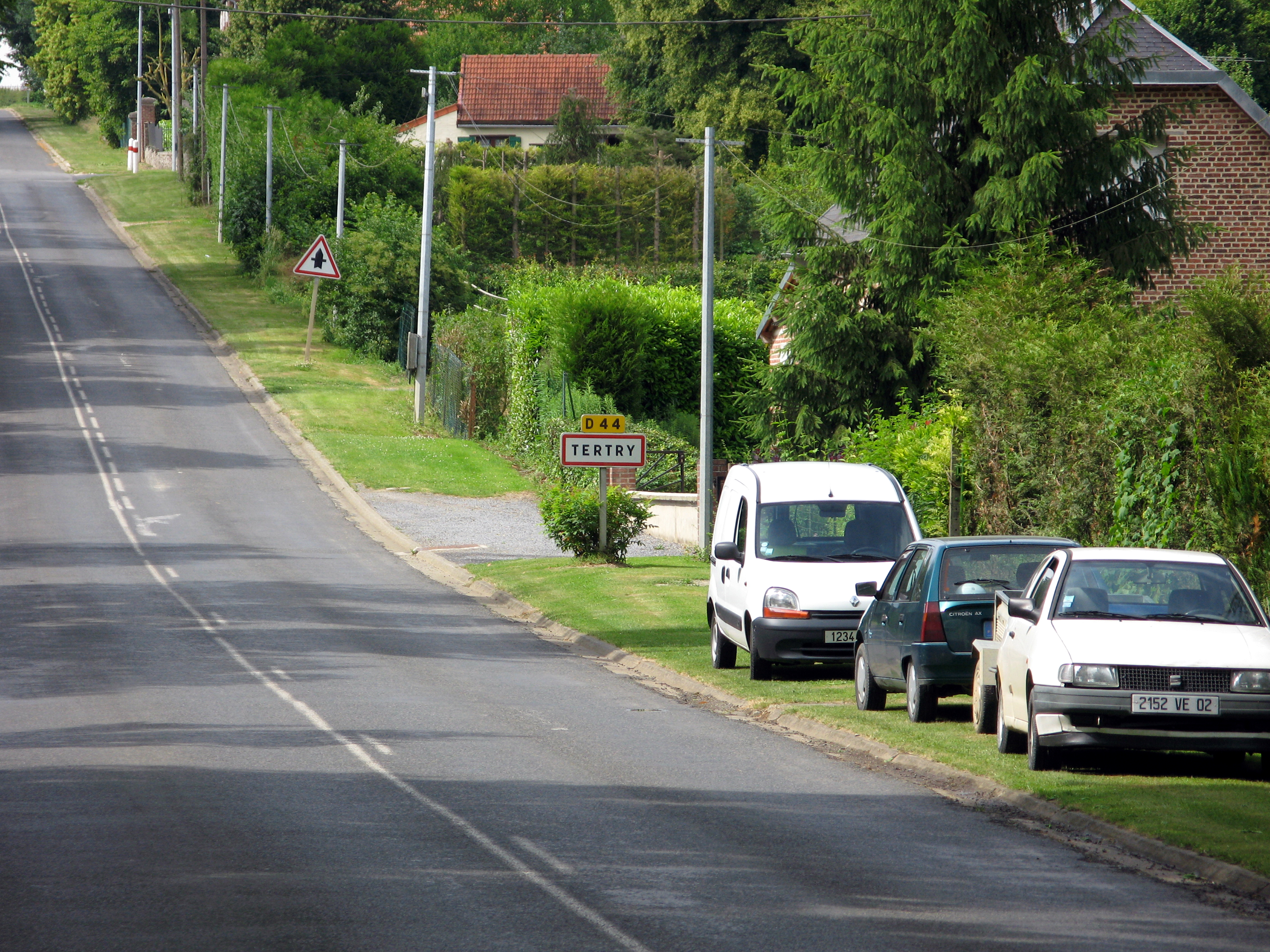
- The road into Tertry
- Location of Tertry
- Location within France Location within Hauts-de-France
- Coordinates: 49°51′47″N 3°04′14″E
- Country: France
- Region: Hauts-de-France
- Department: Somme
- Arrondissement: Péronne
- Canton: Ham
- Intercommunality: CC Est de la Somme

Government
  - Mayor (2020–2026): Gérard Museux
- Area^{1}: 4.93 km^{2} (1.90 sq mi)
- Elevation: 78 m (256 ft)
- Highest elevation: 96 m (315 ft)
- Lowest elevation: 62 m (203 ft)
- Population (2023): 145
  - Density: 29.4/km^{2} (76.2/sq mi)
- Time zone: UTC+01:00 (CET)
  - Summer (DST): UTC+02:00 (CEST)
- INSEE/Postal code: 80750 /80200
- ^{1} French Land Register data, which excludes lakes, ponds, glaciers > 1 km^{2} (0.386 sq mi or 247 acres) and river estuaries.

Tertry (French pronunciation: [tɛʁtʁi]) is a commune in the Somme department in Hauts-de-France in northern France.

== Geography ==
Tertry is situated 50 km (31 mi) east of Amiens, on the D44 and D45 crossroads.

== History ==
Tertry was the site of the battle of Tertry in 687, where Pepin of Herstal defeated Berchar, mayor of the palace of Neustria.

In 1920, British soldiers built a bridge across the Omignon at Tertry.

== Population ==
Historical population
Year	Pop.	±% p.a.
1968	174	—
1975	129	−4.18%
1982	157	+2.85%
1990	185	+2.07%
1999	186	+0.06%
2007	184	−0.14%
2012	176	−0.89%
2017	156	−2.38%
2023	145	−1.21%
Source: INSEE

== See also ==
- Communes of the Somme department
