= Battle of Haspres (1793) =

The 1793 Battle of Haspres occurred on 12 September

Austrian artillery positioned at Iwuy bombarded the French forces, after which Austrian cavalry advancing from the heights of Haspres and Avesnes-le-Sec overwhelmed them. The survivors retreated towards Bouchain and, under cover of darkness, made their way through the ditches of the Sensée to reach Cambrai.
