= Hugh of Rouen (died 730) =

8th-century Frankish clergyman

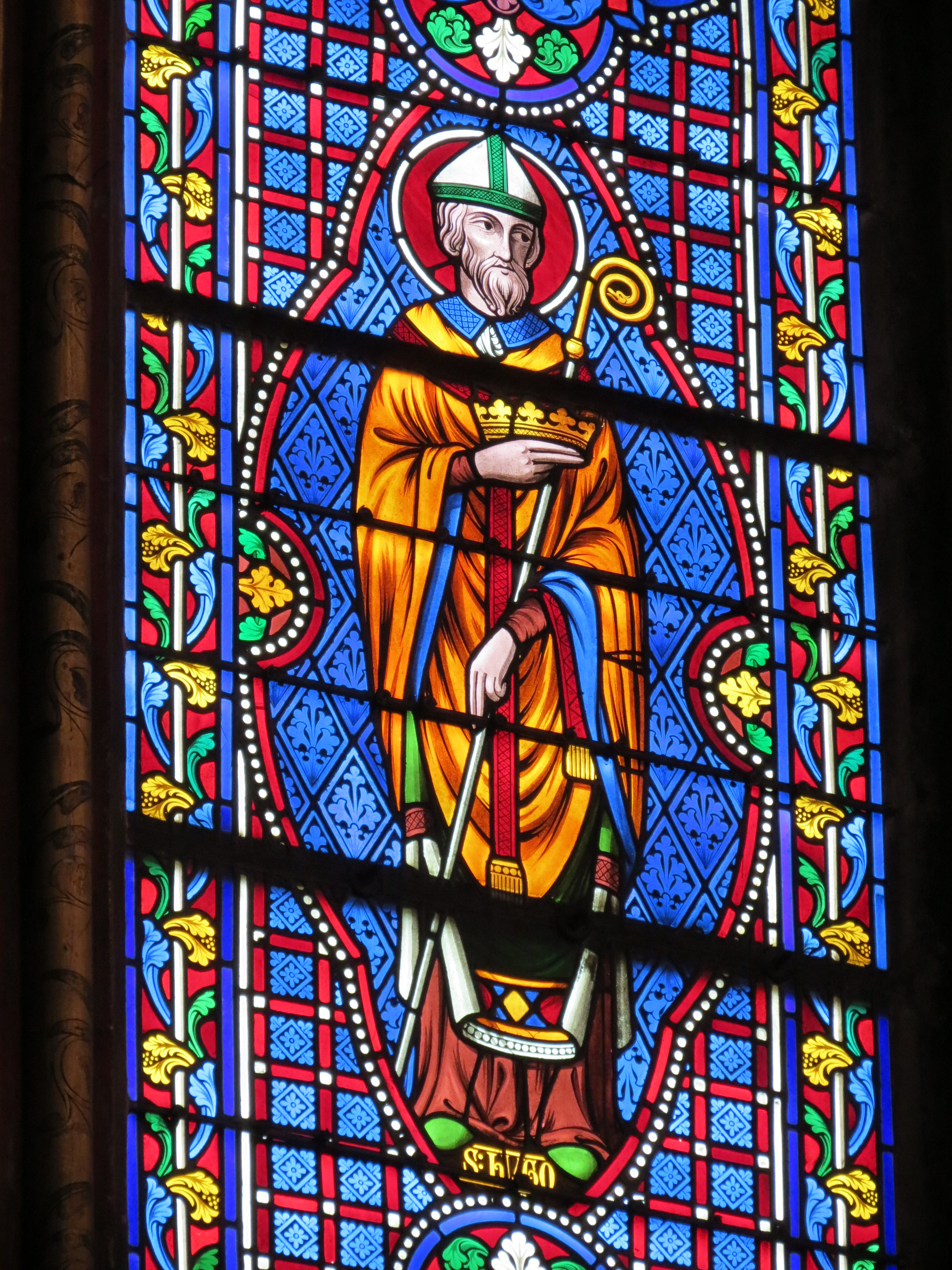
Hugh in stained glass in Notre-Dame de Bonsecours

Hugh of Rouen (died 730) was the son of Duke Drogo of Champagne and his wife Anstrudis. He entered the church and became archbishop of Rouen in 722.

== Life ==
Hugh was the grandson of Pepin of Heristal and Plectrude on his father's side, and of Waratton and Ansfledis on his mother's. Both Waratton and Drogo were mayors of the palaces. He was brought up by his grandmother Ansfled while his father Drogo was duke in distant Champagne. Paul Fouracre regards the education of Hugh as an example of the important role of women in Frankish family fortunes and in politics generally.

While still a layman, Hugh was endowed with Jumièges Abbey, which he entered as a monk in 718 under Abbot Cochin. He later became vicar-general of the Diocese of Metz. In 722, Hugh was elected to the vacant Archdiocese of Rouen. In 723, he accepted charge of Fontenelle Abbey. In 724, he took on the administration, together with his own, of the dioceses of Paris and Bayeux. He used the revenue from his various benefices to promote piety and learning.

Towards the end of his life, Hugh retired to Jumièges, where he died on 9 April 730. He was interred at Jumièges. In the ninth century his relics were relocated to Haspres in order to save them from profanation at the hands of Vikings. He is canonized as a saint and his feast day is kept on 9 April.

== Sources ==
=== Primary sources ===
- Gesta Hugonis archiepiscopi Rotomagensis in the Gesta (sanctorum patrum) Fontanellensis coenobii (dated between about 833 and 840), ed. Samuel Löwenfeld. Gesta Abbatum Fontanellensium. MGH Scriptores rer. Germ. 28. Hanover, 1886 (reprinted 1980). 26–8; ed. F. Lohier and J. Laporte. Gesta sanctorum patrum Fontanellensis coenobii. Société de l'histoire de Normandie. Rouen, 1936. 37–43.
- Another ninth-century Vita, associated with Jumièges, ed. Joseph van der Straeten, "Vie inédite de S. Hugues évêque de Rouen." Analecta Bollandiana 87 (1969): 215–60. Based primarily on Rouen BM 1377 (U 108) f. 135r-150r.
- Baldric of Dol, Vita S. Hugonis, ed. MPL 166. 1163–72. Available online from the Documenta Catholica Omnia

=== Secondary sources ===
- Urdang, Laurence. Holidays and Anniversaries of the World. Detroit: Gale Research Company, 1985. ISBN 0-8103-1546-7.
- Lifshitz, Felice. The Norman Conquest of Pious Neustria: Historiographic Discourse and Saintly Relics, 684-1090. Studies and Texts 122. Toronto: Pontifical Institute of Mediaeval Studies, 1995.
