= Waratto =

Mayor of the Palace of Neustria

- Mayor of the Palace of Neustria
- Reign: 680/81-682 682-686
- Predecessor: (first reign) Ebroin; (second reign) Gistemar
- Successor: (first reign) Gistemar; (second reign) Berchar
- Died: 684/686
- Spouse: Ansflede
- Issue: Gistemar; Anstrud

Waratto (died 686) was the mayor of the palace of Neustria and Burgundy on two occasions, between his son's usurpation. His first term lasted from 680 or 681 (after the death of Ebroin) to 682, when his son Gistemar (or Ghislemar) deposed him and took office. However, Waratto soon reestablished himself and continued to reign until his death in 684 or 686. He made peace between the three Frankish kingdoms and with Pepin of Heristal in 681. His daughter Anstrude later married Duke Drogo of Champagne, Pepin's eldest son.

He married Ansflede and had two aforementioned children:

- Gistemar (d. 684), mayor of the palace of Neustria and Burgundy (682).
- Anstrude, married Berchar, mayor of the palace of Neustria and Burgundy (684-687), later married Drogo of Champagne.

Preceded by Ebroin	Mayor of the Palace of Neustria; 680–682	Succeeded by Gistemar
Preceded by Gistemar	Mayor of the Palace of Neustria; 682–686	Succeeded by Berchar
