= Neustria =

Western part of the kingdom of the Franks

Kingdom of Neustria Neustria, Neustrasia
- 486–751
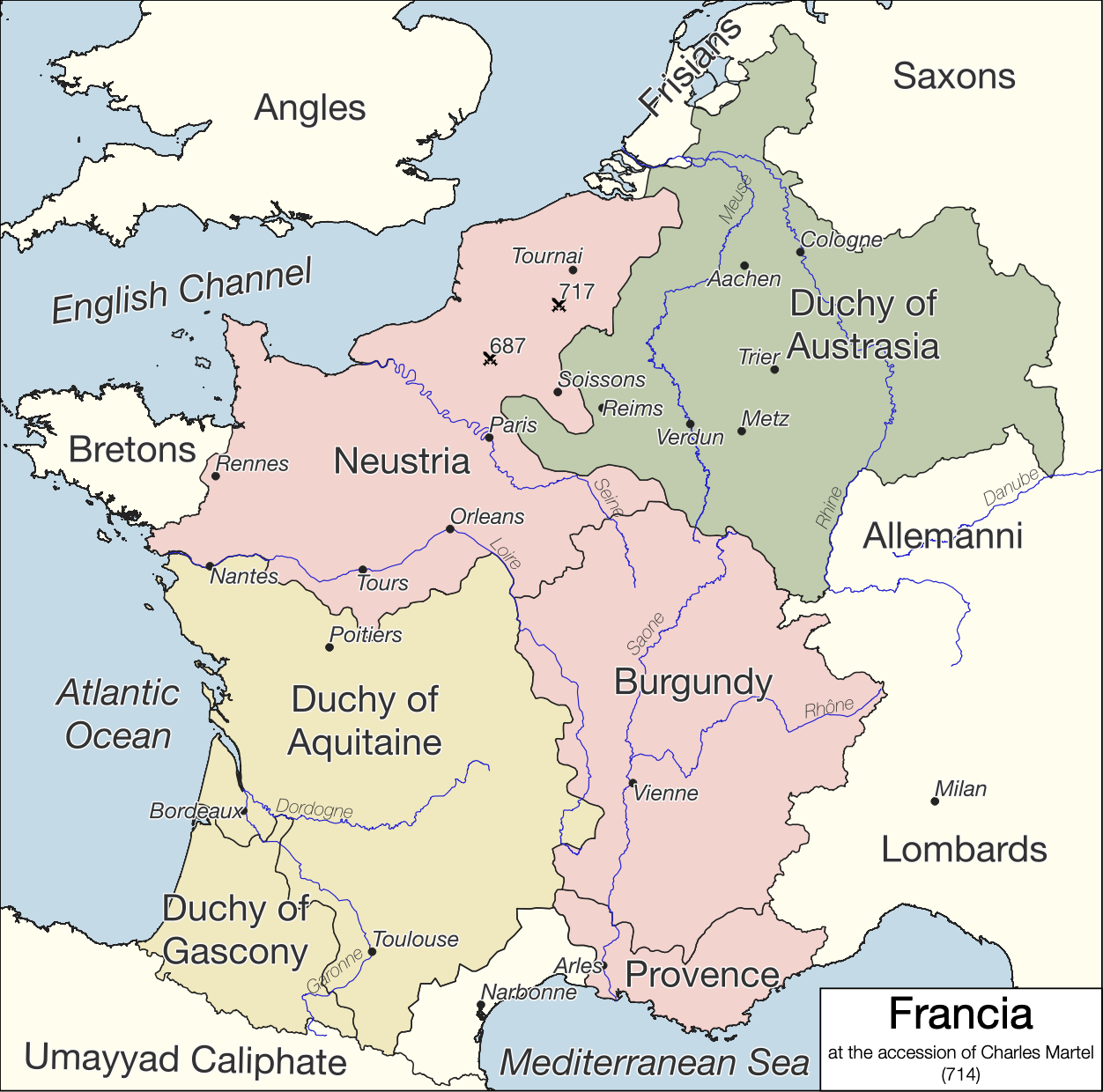
- Neustria (northwest) in 714, surrounded by Austrasia, Aquitaine and Burgundy
- Status: Part of Kingdom of the Franks
- Capital: Soissons
- Official languages: Latin (administration); Old Gallo-Romance; Gaulish (until the late 6th century); Frankish
- Religion: Christianity
- Demonym: Neustrian
- Government: Feudal hereditary monarchy
- King
  - 486–c.509: Clovis I (first)
  - 743–751: Childeric III (last)
- Mayor of the Palace
  - 639–641: Aega (first)
  - 741–751: Pepin III (last)
- Historical era: Early Middle Ages
  - Battle of Soissons: 486
  - Pepin the Short takes the throne: 751
- Currency: Denier
Preceded by	Succeeded by
Kingdom of Soissons	Kingdom of France
- Today part of: France

Neustria was the western part of the Kingdom of the Franks during the Early Middle Ages, in contrast to the eastern Frankish sub-kingdom, Austrasia. It initially included land between the Loire and the Silva Carbonaria, in the north of present-day France, with Paris, Orléans, Tours, Soissons as its main cities.

The same term later referred to a smaller region between the Seine and the Loire rivers known as the regnum Neustriae, a constituent subkingdom of the Carolingian Empire and then West Francia. The Carolingian kings also created a March of Neustria which was a frontier duchy against the Bretons and Vikings that lasted until the Capetian monarchy in the late 10th century, when the term was eclipsed as a European political or geographical term.

== Name ==
The name Neustria is mostly explained as "new western land", although Taylor (1848) suggested the interpretation of "northeastern land". Nordisk familjebok (1913) even suggested "not the eastern land" (icke östland). Augustin Thierry (1825) assumed Neustria is simply a corruption of Westria, from West-rike "western realm". In any case, Neustria contrasts with the name Austrasia "eastern realm". The analogy to Austrasia is even more explicit in the variant Neustrasia.

Neustria was also employed as a term for northwestern Italy during the period of Lombard domination. It was contrasted with the northeast, which was called Austrasia, the same term as given to eastern Francia.

== Merovingian kingdom ==
The predecessor to Neustria was a Roman rump state, the Kingdom of Soissons. In 486 its ruler, Syagrius, lost the struggle for power with Clovis I, the Frankish king, in the Franco Roman War. He was beaten in the Battle of Soissons and the domain was thereafter under the control of the Franks. Constant re-divisions of territories by Clovis's descendants resulted in many rivalries that, for more than two hundred years, kept Neustria in almost constant warfare with Austrasia, the eastern portion of the Frankish Kingdom.

Despite the wars, Neustria and Austrasia re-united briefly on several occasions. The first was under Clotaire I during his reign from 558 to 562. The struggle for power continued with Queen Fredegund of Neustria, the widow of King Chilperic I (reigned 566–584) and the mother of the new king Clotaire II (reigned 584–628), unleashing a bitter war.

After his mother's death and burial in Saint Denis Basilica near Paris in 597, Clotaire II continued the struggle against Queen Brunhilda, and finally triumphed in 613 when Brunhilda's followers betrayed the old queen into his hands. Clotaire had Brunhilda put to the rack and stretched for three days, then chained between four horses and eventually ripped limb from limb. Clotaire now ruled a united realm, but only for a short time as he made his son Dagobert I king of Austrasia. Dagobert's accession in Neustria resulted in another temporary unification.

In Austrasia the Pippinid mayor Grimoald the Elder attempted a coup by forcing the Austrasian king Siegebert III to adopt his son Childebert who succeeded as "Childebert the Adopted". Grimoald and his son Childebert were arrested by Neustrian forces and executed in Paris. Clovis II, after this execution, again reunited the Austrasian kingdom with Neustria, although temporarily. During or soon after the reign of Clovis's son Chlothar III, the dynasty of Neustria, like that of Austrasia before it, ceded authority to its own mayor of the palace.

In 678, Neustria, under Mayor Ebroin, subdued the Austrasians for the last time. Ebroin was murdered in 680. In 687, Pippin of Herstal, mayor of the palace of the King of Austrasia, defeated the Neustrians at Tertry. Thus he guaranteed the predominance of Austrasia, characterized by its territorial aristocracy, over Neustria. Neustria's mayor Berchar was assassinated shortly afterwards and following a marriage alliance (c. 690) between Pippin's son Drogo and Berchar's widow Anstrud of Champagne, Pippin secured his position as mayor of the Neustrian palace.

Pippin's descendants, the Carolingians, continued to rule the two realms as mayors. With Pope Stephen II's blessing, after 751 the Carolingian Pippin the Short formally deposed the Merovingians and took control of the empire, he and his descendants ruling as kings.

Neustria, Austrasia, and Burgundy then became united under one authority and, although it would split once again into various eastern and western divisions, the names "Neustria" and "Austrasia" gradually fell out of use.

== Carolingian subkingdom ==
In 748, the brothers Pepin the Short and Carloman gave their younger brother Grifo twelve counties in Neustria centred on that of Le Mans. This polity was termed the ducatus Cenomannicus, or Duchy of Maine, and this was an alternative name for the regnum of Neustria well into the 9th century.

The term "Neustria" took on the meaning of "land between the Seine and Loire" when it was given as a regnum (kingdom) by Charlemagne to his second son, Charles the Younger, in 790. At this time, the chief city of the kingdom appears to be Le Mans, where the royal court of Charles was established. Under the Carolingian dynasty, the chief duty of the Neustrian king was to defend the sovereignty of the Franks over the Bretons.

In 817, Louis the Pious granted Neustria to his eldest son Lothair I, but following his rebellion in 831, he gave it to Pepin I of Aquitaine, and following the latter's death in 838, to Charles the Bald. Neustria, along with Aquitaine, formed the major part of Charles West Frankish kingdom carved out of the Empire by the Treaty of Verdun (843). Charles continued the tradition of appointing an elder son to reign in Neustria with his own court at Le Mans when he made Louis the Stammerer king in 856. Louis married the daughter of the King of Brittany, Erispoe, and received the regnum from the Breton monarch with the consent of the Frankish magnates. This unique relationship for Neustria stressed how it had shrunk in size to definitely exclude the Île de France and Paris by this time, as it was distanced from the central authority of Charles the Bald and closer to that of Erispoe.

== Carolingian march ==
In 861, the Carolingian king Charles the Bald created the Marches of Neustria that were ruled by officials appointed by the crown, known as wardens, prefects or margraves. Originally, there were two marches, one against the Bretons and one against the Norsemen, often called the Breton March and Norman March respectively.

In 911, Robert I of France became margrave of both Marches and took the title demarchus. His family, the later Capetians, ruled the whole of Neustria until 987, when Hugh Capet was elected to the kingship. The subsidiary counts of Neustria had exceeded the margrave in power by that time and the peak of Viking and Breton raiding had passed. After the Capetian Miracle, no further margraves were appointed and "Neustria" was eclipsed as a European political term (present, however, in some Anglo-Norman chronicles and revived as synonymous with English possession of Normandy under Henry V by the St. Albans chronicler Thomas Walsingham in his Ypodigma Neustriae).

== Rulers ==
=== Merovingian kings ===
- Childeric I 458–481
- Clovis I 481–511
- Chlodomer 511–524
- Childebert I 511–558
- Chlothar I 558–561
- Charibert I 561–567
- Chilperic I 567–584
- Gontran 561–592
- Chlothar II, 584–629
- Dagobert I, 629–639
- Clovis II, 639–657
- Chlothar III, 657–673
- Theuderic III, 673
- Childeric II, 673–675
- Theuderic III, 675–691
- Clovis IV, 691–695
- Childebert III, 695–711
- Dagobert III, 711–715
- Chilperic II, 715–721
- Theuderic IV, 721–737
- Childeric III, 743–751

=== Mayors of the palace ===
- Landric, until 613
- Gundoland, 613–639
- Aega, 639–641
- Erchinoald, 641–658
- Ebroin, 658–673
- Wulfoald, 673–675
- Leudesius, 675
- Ebroin, 675–680 (again)
- Waratton, 680–682
- Gistemar, 682
- Waratton, 682–686 (again)
- Berchar, 686–688
- Pepin of Heristal, 688–695
- Grimoald II, 695–714
- Theudoald, 714–715
- Ragenfrid, 715–718
- Charles Martel, 718–741
- Pepin the Short, 741–751

== Historiography ==
The chief contemporary chronicles written from a Neustrian perspective are the History of the Franks by Gregory of Tours, the Book of the History of the Franks, the Annals of St-Bertin, the Annals of St-Vaast, the Annals by Flodoard of Reims, and the History of the conflicts of the Gauls by Richer of Reims.
