= Berchar =

Berchar (also Berthar) was the mayor of the palace of Neustria and Burgundy from 686 to 688/689. He was the successor of Waratton, whose daughter Anstrude he had married.

Unlike Waratton, however, Berthar did not keep peace with Pepin of Heristal. In 687, Pepin defeated him and Theuderic III at Tertry in the Vermandois. Many fled to the nearby abbeys of Péronne and Saint-Quentin. Berthar and Theuderic III withdrew themselves to Paris. Pepin followed them and eventually forced a peace treaty with the condition that Berthar leave his office. In the ensuing quarrels, Berthar was killed by his mother-in-law Ansfled. His widow married Pepin's eldest son Drogo, duke of Champagne, and Pepin became the mayor of the palace of Neustria and Burgundy without opposition.

Berthar died in either the Autumn of 688 or early 689.

| Preceded by Waratton | Mayor of the Palace of Neustria; 686–687 | Succeeded by Pepin of Herstal |
